= Dolly Swift =

Canadian ice hockey player

Albert Swift
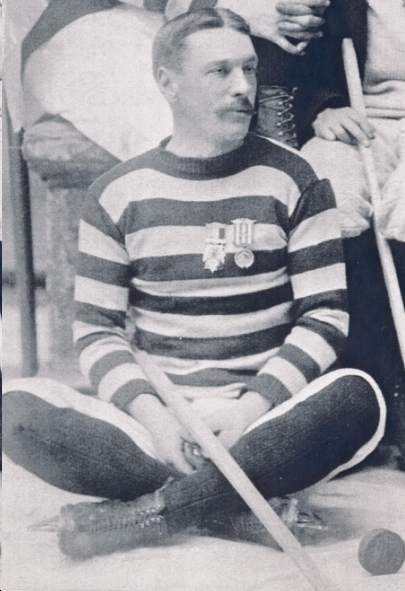
- Swift with the Quebec HC in 1894.
- Born: January 30, 1866 Quebec City, Canada East
- Died: April 20, 1948 (aged 82) Kirkland Lake, Ontario, Canada
- Position: Forward
- Played for: Quebec Hockey Club; Montreal Victorias
- Playing career: c. 1880–1899

Albert Edward "Dolly" Swift (January 30, 1866 – April 20, 1948) was a Canadian amateur ice hockey forward who was active in the 1880s and 1890s. Swift played predominantly for his hometown club Quebec Hockey Club of the Amateur Hockey Association of Canada. He also spent some time with the Montreal Victorias. He was the most successful goal scorer of the 1890s.

Swift later became a general within the Canadian army and appeared with a battalion in World War I.

== Statistics ==
			League
Season	Team	League	GP	G
1880–81	Quebec Hockey Club	AHAC	1	0
1881–82	Quebec Hockey Club	AHAC	1	0
1882–83	Quebec Hockey Club	AHAC	4	0
1883–84	Quebec Hockey Club	AHAC	2	0
1884–85
1885–86	Quebec Hockey Club	AHAC	2	0
1887	Montreal Victorias	AHAC	4	8
1888
1888–89	Quebec Hockey Club	AHAC	3	0
1890
1891
1892
1893	Quebec Hockey Club	AHAC	8	11
1894	Quebec Hockey Club	AHAC	8	10
1895	Quebec Hockey Club	AHAC	6	10
1896	Quebec Hockey Club	AHAC	8	8
1897	Quebec Hockey Club	AHAC	8	6
1898	Quebec Hockey Club	AHAC	6	3
1899	Quebec Hockey Club	CAHL	1	0
Totals			62	56

Statistics per SIHR at sihrhockey.org
