= Montreal Winter Carnival ice hockey tournaments =

Annual amateur ice hockey tournaments

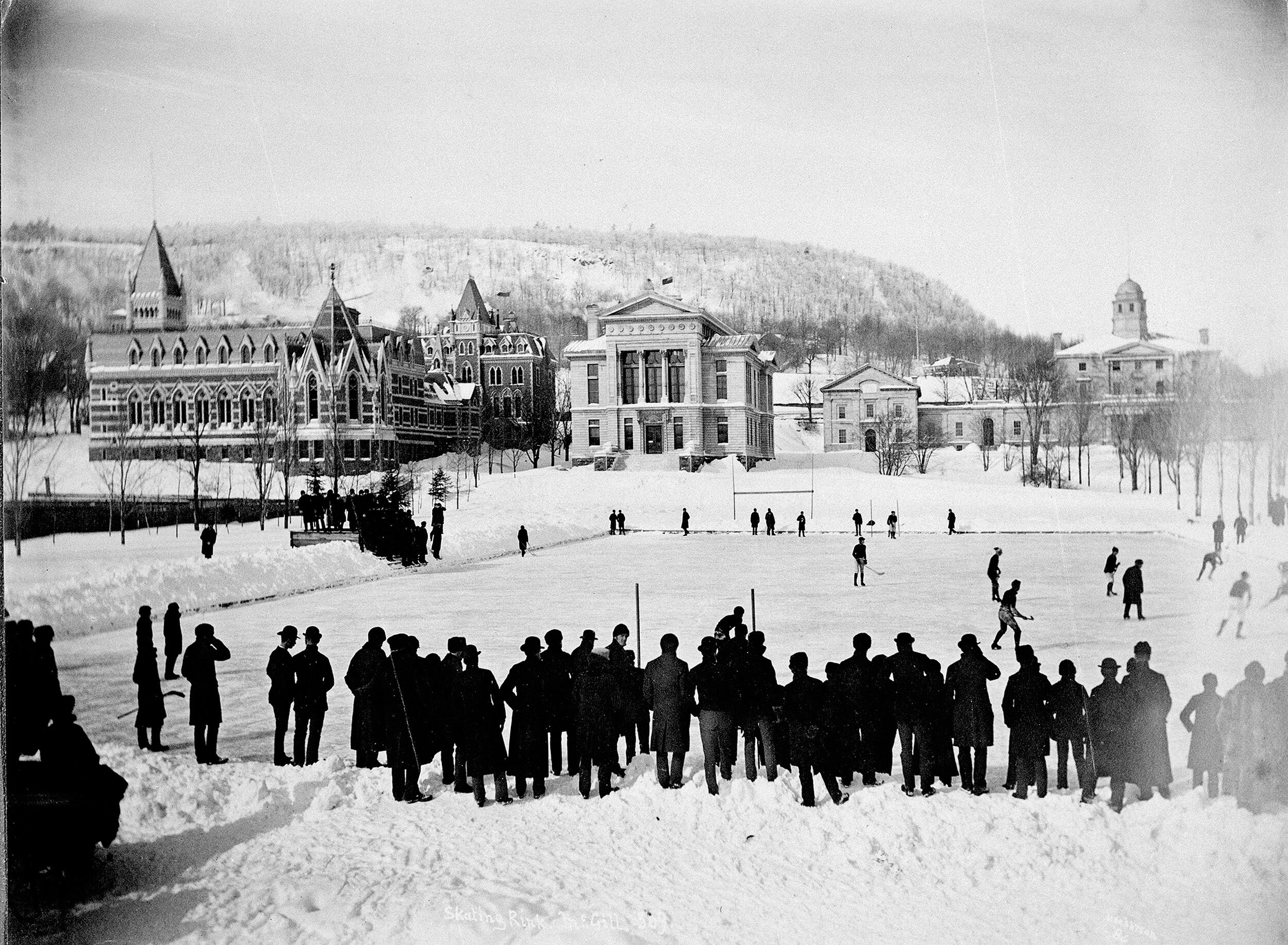
1884 game at McGill

The Montreal Winter Carnival Ice Hockey Tournaments were a series of annual ice hockey tournaments held in the 1880s in conjunction with the Montreal Winter Carnival, in Montreal, Quebec, Canada. First held in 1883, these tournaments are considered to be the first championship ice hockey tournaments and the predecessor to the first championship ice hockey league, the Amateur Hockey Association of Canada.

== History ==
In 1883, the Montreal Amateur Athletic Association was asked to add sports to the events to be held with the Montreal Carnival. The association was affiliated with the Montreal Snow Shoe Club. Along with the McGill Hockey Club, they organized a four-team tournament, played partly outdoors on the Saint Lawrence River. The trophy for this tournament is on display at the McCord Museum in Montreal. In 1884, the location changed to a rink made on the McGill University grounds. It was moved indoors subsequently. The carnival was not held in 1886 and 1888.

In December 1886, the Amateur Hockey Association of Canada was founded by the four Montreal teams (McGill, Montreal Hockey Club, Montreal Crystals, Montreal Victorias) and the Ottawa Hockey Club.

== Season-by-season record ==
- 1883: Montreal Winter Carnival Hockey Tournament (winner McGill), held on the St. Lawrence River
- 1884: Montreal Winter Carnival Hockey Tournament (winner Victorias), held at McGill's outdoor rink
- 1885: Montreal Winter Carnival Hockey Tournament (winner Montreal), held at the Crystal Rink
- 1886: No tournament; Carnival cancelled — Dominion Championship (winner Crystals)
- 1887: Montreal Winter Carnival Hockey Tournament (winner Montreal)
- 1888: No tournament; Carnival cancelled
- 1889: Montreal Winter Carnival Hockey Tournament (winner Victorias)

=== 1883 ===
The carnival was held from January 23 to 28. Montreal, McGill and Quebec teams contested the trophy and McGill won the tournament. The trophy for this tournament is on display at the Musee McCord Museum in Montreal.

Date	Team	Score	Team	Score	Location
Tournament
January 26	Montreal Victorias	0	Quebec	0	St. Lawrence River rink
January 26	McGill	2	Montreal Victorias	1	St. Lawrence River rink
January 27	McGill	2	Quebec	2	Crystal Rink
January 27	Quebec	1	Montreal Victorias	1	Victoria Rink

McGill wins hockey tournament

==== Rosters ====
The following players were part of the hockey teams participating in the 1883 Montreal Winter Carnival.

Montreal Victorias: C. Lamothe (c.), S. Abbott, J. Arnton, E. Sheppard, E. Stevenson, J. Muir, D. Watt.

Quebec HC: W. Scott (c.), F. Ashe, A. Scott, M. Swift, A. Colley, S. Valler, A. Davidson.

McGill: A. Low, J. Elder, T. Green, R. Smith, W. Murray, J. Kinlock (c.), P. Foster.

Source: Montreal Daily Witness

=== 1884 ===
1884 Montreal Winter Carnival program cover

The 1884 tournament saw several games lost due to rain. The outdoor rink was unplayable on February 6 and the Crystals and Wanderers did not show at the rink for their games. Both teams lost by default although the games could not have been played.

The tournament was the first appearance of the Ottawa Hockey Club (which would eventually field a team in the National Hockey League) in competitive play. The club made it to the final game before losing to the Victorias 1–0.

Date	Team	Score	Team	Score	Location
Exhibitions
February 1	Crystals	5	Wanderers	0	Crystal Rink
Tournament
February 4	Victorias	1	McGill	0	McGill Rink
February 5	Crystals	1	Wanderers	0	McGill Rink
February 6	McGill	W	Crystals	L(default)	McGill Rink
February 6	Wanderers	L(default)	Victorias	W	McGill Rink
February 7	McGill	1	Ottawa	0	McGill Rink
February 8	Ottawa	9	Victorias	1	McGill Rink
February 8	Wanderers	L(default)	McGill	W	McGill Rink
February 9	Ottawa	3	McGill	0	McGill Rink
February 9	Victorias	2	Crystals	0	McGill Rink
February 11	Victorias	1	Ottawa	0	McGill Rink

Victorias win Winter Carnival Tournament

Source: Montreal Gazette

=== 1885 ===
Date	Team	Score	Team	Score	Location
Tournament
January 27	Ottawa	3	Victorias	1	Crystal Rink
January 28	Montreal	6	Montreal Football Club	0	Crystal Rink
January 29	McGill	2	Crystals	0	Crystal Rink
January 30	Ottawa	2	Montreal	2	Crystal Rink
January 31	Montreal	1	Ottawa	0	Crystal Rink
January 31	Montreal	1	McGill	0	Crystal Rink

Montreal wins Winter Carnival Tournament

Source: Montreal Gazette

==== Rosters ====
The following players were part of the hockey teams participating in the 1885 Montreal Winter Carnival.

Montreal Victorias: J. Arnton, J. Muir

Montreal HC: Tom Paton, Fred Larmonth, Billy Aird, Billy Hodgson, Richard Smith, F. W. Barlow, Duncan McIntyre.

McGill: G. W. Stephens, J. M. Elder, Hanbury Arthur Budden, J. A. Kinlock, H. D. Johnson, R. E. Palmer, C. P. Brown.

Montreal Football Club: A. Elliott, R. Campbell, W. J. Cleghorn, A. J. Campbell, R. Sterling, D. Robertson.

Montreal Crystals: William Hutchison, James A. Stewart, Robert Laing, Jack A. Findlay, Allan Cameron, W. McCaffrey, D. Labonte.

Ottawa HC: William O'Dell, G. Currier, Thomas D. Green, Tom Gallagher, Frank Jenkins (c.), Jack Kerr, Halder Kirby.

Source: Montreal Gazette

=== 1887 ===
In February, the Montreal teams of the Amateur Hockey Association of Canada participated in the Montreal Winter Carnival hockey tournament. The tournament, which was scheduled to play outdoors on an ice rink at the Ice Palace, was disrupted by two days of storms, and was not completed until February 25. During this time, no challenges were played.

Date	Team	Score	Team	Score	Location
Exhibitions
February 7	Victorias	2	Montreal	0	Ice Palace Rink
February 11	Montreal Crystals	5	Montreal HC (second)	0	Crystal Rink
"Tournament" (second teams)
February 17	Montreal Crystals	6	Montreal HC	3	Crystal Rink
February 23	Montreal Victorias	5	McGill	1	Victoria Rink
February 25	Montreal Victorias	1	Montreal HC	1	Victoria Rink
Tournament
February 21	Montreal Crystals	0	Montreal HC	1	Crystal Rink
February 23	Montreal Victorias	8	McGill	0	Crystal Rink
February 25	Montreal Victorias	0	Montreal HC	1	Crystal Rink

Montreal wins Winter Carnival Tournament

Source: Montreal Gazette

==== Rosters ====
The following players were part of the hockey teams participating in the 1887 Montreal Winter Carnival.

Montreal HC: W. Hutchison, J. Stewart, A. Cameron, J. Findlay, A. Hodgson, J. Virtue, W. Hodgson.

Montreal Victorias: T. Arnton, J. Muir, J. Campbell, A. Shearer, J. Arnton, J. Craven, E. Barlow.

Montreal Crystals: W. Norris; D. Brown, C. Ellard; R. Laing, J. McDonald, S. McQuisten, J. McGoldrick, D. Elliott.

McGill: H. McNutt, A. Shanks, C. Wylde, F. Lucas, H. Budden, D. Hamilton, W. Warden.

Source: The Montreal Daily Herald

=== 1889 ===
The 1889 Winter Carnival featured the first game of ice hockey witnessed by Lord Stanley, Governor General of Canada, who would later donate the Stanley Cup.

Date	Team	Score	Team	Score	Location
February 4	Victorias	2	Montreal	1	Victoria Rink
February 9	Crystals	7	McGill	3	Victoria Rink
February 18	Victorias	3	Crystals	2	Victoria Rink

Montreal Victorias win Winter Carnival Tournament

Source: Kitchen 2000, p.12

== 1886 Burlington Winter Carnival ==
The Burlington Coasting Club proposed a winter carnival for the city of Burlington, Vermont as a rival attraction to the Montreal Winter Carnival, with the hope of inaugurating the event. It was scheduled to begin on February 15, 1886 and featured five days of winter sports activities. A committee from the club had been visiting Montreal to obtain attractions for the carnival as well as gain tips on how to manage the event. The Montreal Snow Shoe Club, along with several organisations from Montreal were invited to the carnival to participate in the events. The Montreal Crystals and the Montreal Hockey Club accepted the invitation, as did the Ottawa Hockey Club, which later withdrew due to scheduling conflicts. A local team was quickly assembled from the employees of the Van Ness House, a hotel in Burlington. Montreal HC won the gold medal, and the Crystals won the silver. Originally scheduled for February 15–19, the organizers were forced to move the events one week later due to unseasonable weather. The carnival was held on February 22–26. The hockey games were played on Lake Champlain in heavy wind. The first game was played on the morning of February 26, with two 20-minute halves. There was no score through 40 minutes, and Montreal's R. Smith scored in overtime. The second game was between Montreal HC and Van Ness House, and it was the first international ice hockey game. The players representing Van Ness House did not have any hockey experience, having only gone through a few practices prior to the carnival. The two teams played two 15-minute periods, with Montreal winning 3–0 and thus claiming the gold medal. The final game was played in two 10-minute periods, with Joseph McGoldrick of the Crystals scoring the only goal to capture the silver medal.

Date	Team	Score	Team	Score	Location
February 26	Montreal HC	1 (OT)	Crystals	0	Lake Champlain
February 26	Montreal HC	3	Van Ness House	0	Lake Champlain
February 26	Crystals	1	Van Ness House	0	Lake Champlain

Montreal wins Winter Carnival Tournament

Source: Lord Stanley: The Man Behind the Cup (ISBN 1-55168-281-8)

=== Rosters ===
The following players were part of the hockey teams participating in the 1886 Burlington Winter Carnival.

Van Ness House: Lewis C. Johnson, Charles H. Whitcomb, Maxwell A. Kilvert, William F. Waters, Edward. S. Griffing, Howard Crane, Walter A. Laduke (captain)
Montreal HC: Tom L. Paton, George S. Lowe, Duncan McIntyre, Francis Barlow, Francis Crispo, William C. Hodgson, Richard F. Smith, Fred M. Larmonth (captain)
Montreal Crystals: Allan Cameron, Jonathan A. Findlay, Edward McCaffrey, Joseph F. McGoldrick, William Hutchison, James Virtue, Robert Laing (captain)

== See also ==
- List of pre-NHL seasons
