= 1894 AHAC season =

Ice hockey season

- League: Amateur Hockey Association of Canada
- Sport: Ice hockey
- Duration: January 5 – March 10, 1894
- Teams: 5

1894
- Champions: Montreal Hockey Club

AHAC seasons
- ← 1893 1895 →

The 1894 Amateur Hockey Association of Canada season lasted from January 5 until March 10. The season ended with a four-way tie, necessitating a playoff to decide the league and Stanley Cup championships. The Montreal Hockey Club defeated the Ottawa Hockey Club in the final playoff game to claim the title. These were the first ever Stanley Cup playoff games as the first Stanley Cup was awarded to the 1893 regular season first place finisher - also the Montreal Hockey Club.

== Executive ==
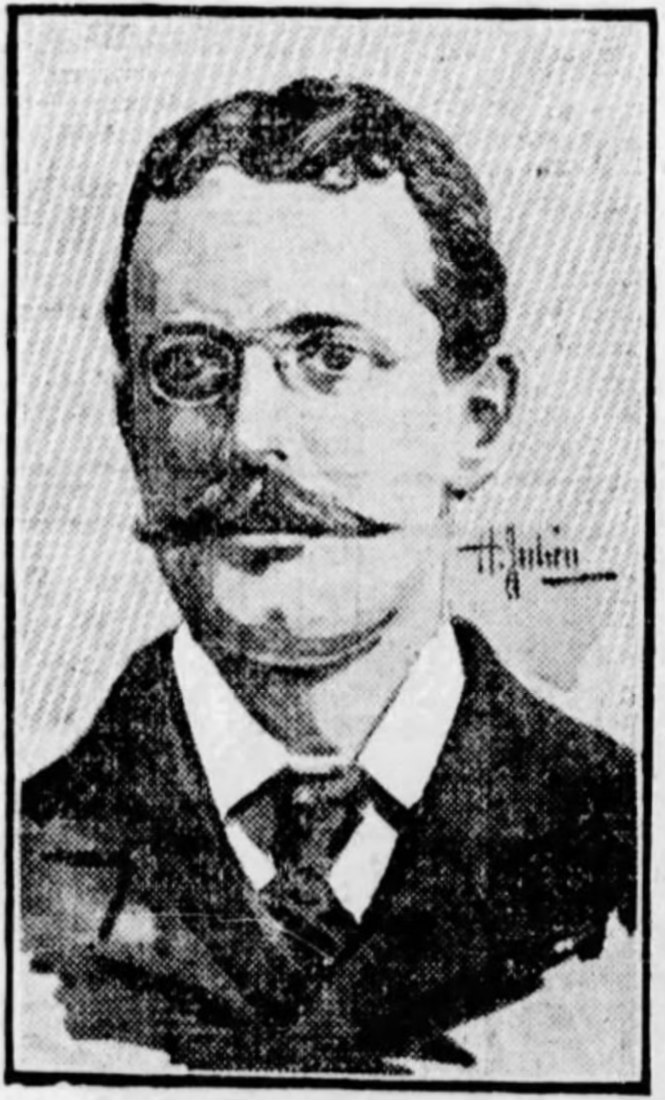
League executive Watson Jack.

- President - Watson Jack, Victorias
- First Vice Pres. - A. Laurie, Quebec
- Second Vice Pres. - Weldy C. Young, Ottawa
- Secretary-Treasurer - J. A. Findlay, Montreal

== Season ==
=== Highlights ===
In two games players scored five goals. In the opening game, in which Montreal soundly defeated Quebec 7–0, Haviland Routh scored five. On January 20, Bert Russel of Ottawa scored five.

=== Final standing ===
Note GP = Games Played, W = Wins, L = Losses, T = Ties, GF = Goals For, GA = Goals Against

Team	GP	W	L	T	GF	GA
Montreal Hockey Club	8	5	3	0	25	15
Ottawa Hockey Club	8	5	3	0	24	16
Montreal Victorias	8	5	3	0	36	20
Quebec Hockey Club	8	5	3	0	26	27
Montreal Crystals	8	0	8	0	10	43

=== Results ===
Month	Day	Visitor	Score	Home	Score
Jan.	5	Quebec HC	0	Montreal HC	7
Jan.	6	Crystals	1	Ottawa HC	6
Jan.	6	Quebec HC	3	Victorias	7
Jan.	13	Victorias	3	Montreal HC	4
Jan.	13	Ottawa HC	1	Quebec HC	4
Jan.	18	Crystals	1	Montreal HC	3
Jan.	20	Victorias	1	Ottawa HC	5
Jan.	20	Quebec HC	4	Crystals	1
Jan.	27	Ottawa HC	4	Montreal HC	1
Jan.	27	Crystals	4	Quebec HC	8
Feb.	3	Quebec HC	3	Montreal HC	2
Feb.	9	Ottawa HC	3	Crystals	1
Feb.	10	Montreal HC	1	Victorias	2
Feb.	17	Ottawa HC	2	Victorias	3
Feb.	24	Montreal HC	5	Ottawa HC	1
Feb.	24	Victorias	3	Quebec HC	4
Mar.	2	Montreal HC	2	Crystals	1
Mar.	3	Quebec HC	0	Ottawa HC	2
Mar.	7	Victorias	6	Crystals	0
Mar.	10	Victorias	11	Crystals	1

== Player Stats ==
=== Scoring leaders ===
Note: GP = games played, G = Goals scored.

Name	Club	GP	G
Dolly Swift	Quebec HC	8	10
Bert Russell	Ottawa HC	8	9
Haviland Routh	Montreal HC	8	8
Billy Barlow	Montreal HC	8	8
Chauncey Kirby	Ottawa	8	8
Shirley Davidson	Victorias	8	6
Robert James Davidson	Quebec HC	8	6
Robert J. Davidson	Quebec HC	7	6
A. Dickson Scott	Quebec HC	8	5
Robert "Bob" McDougall	Ottawa HC	7	5

=== Goaltending averages ===
Note: GP = Games played, GA = Goals against, SO = Shutouts, GAA = Goals against average

Name	Club	GP	GA	SO	GAA
Herbert Collins	Montreal HC	8	15	1	1.875
Albert Morel	Ottawa HC	8	16	1	2.00
Gordon Lewis	Victorias	6	13	1	2.16
Robert Jones	Victorias	1	3		3.00
Frank Stocking	Quebec HC	8	27		3.375
James "Shiner" White	Crystals	2	8		4.00
Hartland MacDougall	Victorias	1	4		4.00
Alexander Clapperton	Crystals	4	18		4.5
Carpenter	Crystals	1	6		6.00
Kearns	Crystals	1	11		11.00

== Playoffs ==
The first Stanley Cup playoff game occurred on March 17, 1894. At the end of the 1894 AHAC season, four teams tied for the AHA championship with records of 5–3–0. This created problems for the AHA governors and the Cup's trustees since there was no tie-breaking system in place. After long negotiation and the withdrawal of Quebec from the championship situation, it was decided that a three-team tournament would take place in Montreal, with Ottawa getting a bye to the finals (being the sole "road" team). The Montreal HC defeated the Montreal Victorias, 3 – 2. Five days later on March 22, 1894, Montreal successfully defended their title with a 3 – 1 win over Ottawa. They later awarded the winning players gold pocket watches. The OHA champion Osgoode Hall challenged for the Cup, but this was abandoned due to the lack of natural ice.

=== Game one: Montreal Hockey Club vs. Montreal Victorias ===
Ice conditions were described as not very good. The game was considered exciting, however, with Haviland Routh and Billy Barlow starring.

Date	Winning Team	Score	Losing Team	Location
March 17, 1894	Montreal Hockey Club	3 – 2	Montreal Victorias	Victoria Rink

==== Game one rosters ====
Montreal HC	3		2	Victorias
Herbert Collins		G		Gordon Lewis
Allan Cameron		P		Mike Grant
George James		CP		William Pullan
Billy Barlow	2	F	1	Shirley Davidson
Clare Mussen		F	1	Robert MacDougall
Archie Hodgson	1	F		Norman Rankin
Haviland Routh		F		Reg Wallace
Referee: Weldy Young, Ottawa

=== Game two: Ottawa Hockey Club vs. Montreal Hockey Club ===
The final was close and in doubt until Billy Barlow scored the winning goal at 9'00" of the third quarter.

According to the Globe report of the game:

"Team play was marred by the softness of the ice. Rough and foul play was frequent, both defences indulging freely in tripping and slashing. Young of Ottawa was injured by James in the second half and although he finished the game without apparent distress, fainted dead away at the end of it. After the match the victors were carried off the rink."

Date	Winning Team	Score	Losing Team	Location
March 22, 1894	Montreal Hockey Club	3 – 1	Ottawa Hockey Club	Victoria Rink

==== Game two rosters ====
Ottawa HC	1		3	Montreal HC
Albert Morel		G		Herbert Collins
Harvey Pulford		P		Allan Cameron
Weldy Young		CP		George James
Chauncey Kirby	1	F		Haviland Routh
Bert Russel		F		Clare Mussen
Joe McDougall		F	2	Archie Hodgson
Sam McDougall		F	1	Billy Barlow
Referee: Herbert Scott, Quebec

== Stanley Cup engraving ==
1894 Montreal Hockey Club
Players
Forwards
Billy Barlow
Clare Mussen
Archie Hodgson
Haviland Routh
Alex Kingan
Alex Irving
Arthur Waud
Aubrey Mussen †
Defencemen
Allan Cameron (point)
George James (cover point)
Eddie O'Brien (point)
James Stewart (cover point)
Goaltender
Herbert Collins

- † Spare/did not play/on team picture
- ^ Unknown who played Center, Rover, Right Wing and Left Wing, so the players are listed as forwards

non-players=

- Harry L. Shaw (Manager/Secretary-Treasurer)
- Tom Paton (President of the AAA) (missing from team picture)

== See also ==
- List of pre-NHL seasons
- List of Stanley Cup champions

Preceded by Montreal HC; 1893	Montreal Hockey Club; Stanley Cup Champions; 1894	Succeeded by Montreal Victorias; 1895
Preceded by 1893 AHAC season	AHAC seasons 1894	Succeeded by 1895 AHAC season
