= 1895 AHAC season =

Ice hockey season

- League: Amateur Hockey Association of Canada
- Sport: Ice hockey
- Duration: January 3 – March 8, 1895
- Teams: 5

1895
- Champions: Montreal Victorias

AHAC seasons
- ← 1894 1896 →

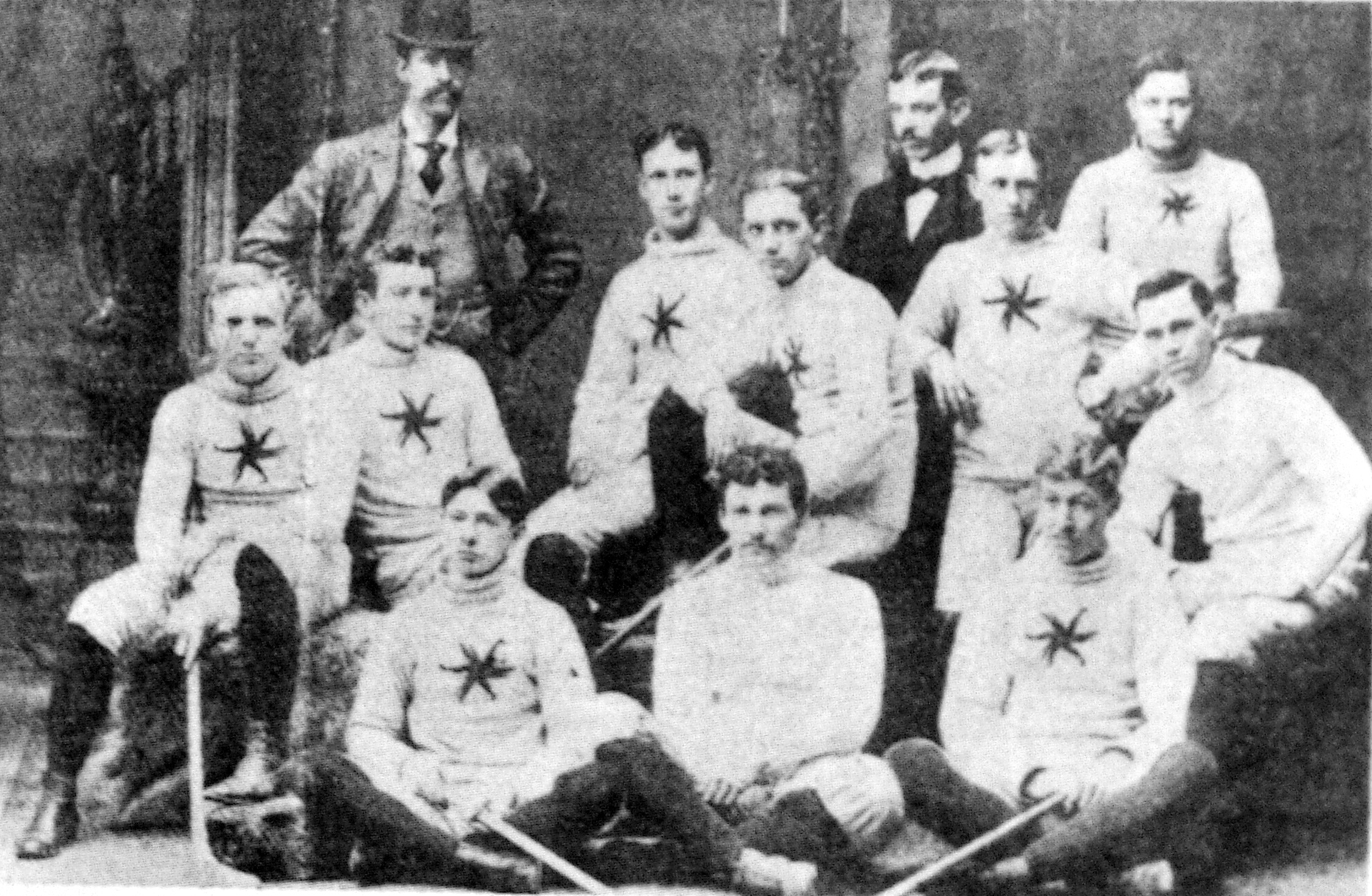
Ottawa HC in 1895.

The 1895 Amateur Hockey Association of Canada season lasted from January 3 until March 8. Each team played 8 games, and Montreal Victorias were first with a 6–2–0 record. After a required Stanley Cup challenge played between the 1894 winners, Montreal HC and Queen's, champion of the Ontario Hockey Association, the Victorias inherited the Stanley Cup as league champions.

== Executive ==
- Watson Jack, Victorias (President)
- A. Laurie, Quebec (1st. Vice-Pres.)
- Weldy Young, Ottawa (2nd. Vice-Pres.)
- J. A. Findlay, Montreal (Sec.-Treasurer)

== Regular season ==
=== Highlights ===
The Crystals suffered three straight defeats to open the season. After this, they decided independently to merge with the Montreal Shamrocks. On February 2, this new team defeated Quebec 2–1. The game was protested by Quebec and the result was cancelled and not replayed.

Another game involving Quebec was noteworthy, on February 23 against Ottawa, won by Ottawa 3–2. The game, played at Quebec, was very rough and the crowd became hostile towards the visitors. At the end of the match, the crowd pursued referee Hamilton and Umpire Findlay as they left the arena, and dragged them back to force them to declare the game a draw. Police were called to break up the demonstration. Subsequent to the match, the AHAC decided to suspend the Quebec hockey club for the rest of the season.

=== Final Standing ===
Note GP = Games Played, W = Wins, L = Losses, T = Ties, GF = Goals For, GA = Goals Against

Team	GP	W	L	T	GF	GA
Montreal Victorias	8	6	2	0	35	20
Montreal Hockey Club	8	4	4	0	33	22
Ottawa Hockey Club	8	4	4	0	25	24
Montreal Crystals/Montreal Shamrocks	7	3	4	0	21	39
Quebec Hockey Club	7	2	5	0	18	27

=== Results ===
Month	Day	Visitor	Score	Home	Score
Jan.	3	Crystals	2	Victorias	7
Jan.	5	Montreal HC	2	Quebec HC	4
Jan.	5	Crystals	1	Ottawa HC	9
Jan.	11	Montreal HC	9	Crystals	1
Jan.	12	Ottawa HC	1	Victorias	5
Jan.	19	Ottawa HC	2	Montreal HC	3
Jan.	19	Victorias	3	Quebec HC	4
Jan.	26	Quebec HC	0	Ottawa HC	1
Jan.	26	Victorias	0	Montreal HC	5
Feb.	2 (†)	Crystals	2	Quebec	1
Feb.	9	Quebec HC	3	Montreal HC	6
Feb.	16	Montreal HC	3	Ottawa	4 (OT 12')
Feb.	16	Quebec HC	2	Victorias	8
Feb.	23	Ottawa HC	3	Quebec HC	2
Feb.	23	Montreal HC	2	Victorias	4
Feb.	27 (‡)	Quebec HC	3	Crystals	4
Mar.	2	Crystals	4	Montreal HC	3
Mar.	2	Victorias	3	Ottawa HC	2
Mar.	6 (₳)	Ottawa HC	3	Crystals	7
Mar.	8	Victorias	5	Crystals	2

† Game void following protest by Quebec over Crystals use of ineligible players

‡ Quebec team suspended after attack on officials after game of February 23

₳ Victorias clinch league championship

== Player Stats ==
=== Leading scorers ===
Note: GP = Games played, G = Goals scored

Name	Club	GP	G
Haviland Routh	Montreal HC	8	19
Norman Rankin	Victorias	8	11
Albert E. Swift	Quebec HC	6	10
Herbert Russell	Ottawa HC	8	10
Robert MacDougall	Victorias	8	10
Graham Drinkwater	Victorias	8	9
Fairbairn	Crystals	5	6
Archie Hodgson	Montreal HC	6	6
Chauncey Kirby	Ottawa HC	7	5
Alf Smith	Ottawa HC	8	5

Coleman(1966) pp. 22–24.

=== Goaltending averages ===
Note: GP = Games played, GA = Goals against, SO = Shutouts, GAA = Goals against average

Name	Club	GP	GA	SO	GAA
Hartland McDougall*	Victorias	1	1		1.0
Robert Jones	Victorias	4	8		2.0
Jim Fenwick	Victorias	1	2		2.0
Herbert Collins	Montreal HC	8	22	1	2.7
Fred Chittick	Ottawa HC	6	18	1	3.0
Harry Westwick	Ottawa HC	2	6		3.0
James "Shiner" White	Crystals	1	4		3.7
Frank Stocking	Quebec HC	7	27		3.9
Hartland McDougall *	Victorias	2	9		4.5
H. Lyons	Crystals	2	16		8.0

Note: Although A. Mcdougall is recorded in most hockey sources as to playing goal for the Montreal Victorias on January 12, 1895, and allowing one goal only, primary sourcing can show that Hartland MacDougall actually played goal for the Vics between January 12 and January 26 before being replaced by Robert Jones.

== Stanley Cup challenges ==
=== Montreal vs. Queen's ===
On March 8, 1895, the Montreal Victorias won the 1895 AHAC title, finishing the season with a 6–2 record. Under the Stanley Cup rules, the team would also be awarded the Stanley Cup as league champions. However, the trustees ruled that a challenge between the previous year's champion Montreal HC and the squad from Queen's University, the champions of the Ontario Hockey Association (OHA), would have to be played first to determine if the Cup remained with the AHAC. Thus, it was decided that if the Montreal HC won the challenge match, the Victorias would become the Stanley Cup champions. The Montreal HC would eventually win the game, 5–1, and their crosstown rivals were crowned the champions.

Date	Winning Team	Score	Losing Team	Location
March 9, 1895	Montreal Hockey Club	5–1	Queen's University	Victoria Rink
Montreal Victorias wins the Cup based on winning the AHAC title, and Montreal HC defeating Queen's University

Billy Barlow, the star player of Montreal was not able to play and Clarence McKerrow took his place. McKerrow had not played any games for Montreal, and could be considered a ringer, but there was no protest from Queen's. The Queen's team, although described as looking fast in their tiger jerseys, were no match for Montreal and the game proved uninteresting. Randy McLennan of Queen's would later play for Dawson City Nuggets in their 1905 challenge series against Ottawa.

Queen's U at Montreal
Queens U.	1		Montreal HC	5
Robert Carroll Hiscock		G	Herbert Collins	
Guy Curtis		P	Frank Bickerdike	
Fenwick Taylor		CP	Allan Cameron	
Arthur Breden Cunningham		F	Clare Mussen	1
George McKay	1	F	Clarence McKerrow	1
Randy McLennan		F	Haviland Routh	2
George Forrest Weatherhead		F	Archie Hodgson	1

Referee—F. C. Chittick

Umpires—Fred McRobie and Alex Robertson

Coleman(1966) pp. 24–25

== Stanley Cup engravings ==
While the Montreal Hockey Club won its challenge 5–1, it was not presented with the Stanley Cup.

1895 Montreal Hockey Club
Players
Forwards
Charles Archibald
Billy Barlow
Norman Dawes
Archie Hodgson
Clarence McKerrow
Aubrey Mussen
Haviland Routh
Defencemen
Frank Bickerdike (point)
Allan Cameron Jr. (cover point)
George James (cover point)
Clare Mussen (point)
Goaltender
Herbert Collins

1895 Montreal Victorias
Players
Forwards
Graham Drinkwater (rover)
Shirley Davidson ^
Robert MacDougall ^
Norman Rankin ^
Defencemen
Mike Grant (cover point) Captain
Howard Henderson (point)
Roland Elliot (point)
William Pullan (point)
Goaltender
Robert Jones
Jim Fenwick @
Hartland MacDougall @

- & Unknown first name.
- ^ Unknown who played Centre, Right Wing and Left Wing, so the players are listed as forwards
- @ Missing from the team picture

non-players=

- Watson Jack (President)
- Fred Meredith (Hon. President)
- P.M. Desterneck (Secretary/Treasurer)
- George R. Hooper (Director)

On-team program - Mr. T.P. Howard, Mr. A.G. Robertson, Mr. W.L. Jamieson, Mr. Frank Howard Wilson (Executives), Mr. W.D. Stephen (Vice President), but missing from the Stanley Cup winning picture.

engraving-notes=

- 1895 MONTREAL VICTORIAS
- Jim Fenwick would leave the team at the end of the season.
- Some sources say A. MacDougall and Hartland MacDougall each played one game in goal. There no official records of an A. MacDougall ever played hockey for the Montreal Victorias. So it was most likely that Hartland played both games, and an H just looked like an A. (page 22, 24 Trail of Stanley Cup Vol 1., by Charles Coleman)

.

== See also ==
- List of pre-NHL seasons
- List of Stanley Cup champions

Preceded by Montreal HC; 1894	Montreal Victorias; Stanley Cup Champions; 1895	Succeeded by Winnipeg Victorias; February 1896
Preceded by 1894 AHAC season	AHAC seasons 1895	Succeeded by 1896 AHAC season
