= List of pre-NHL seasons =

Prior to the first season of the National Hockey League (NHL), which began on December 19, 1917, there had been numerous seasons of ice hockey played by various amateur and professional leagues, often concurrently, dating back to the 1880s. These early leagues laid the foundation for the NHL. Below is a list of pre-NHL seasons by ice hockey leagues that are precursors of the National Hockey League.

== Amateur and professional leagues ==
Season	Amateur leagues					Professional leagues							Champion / Stanley Cup Champion
Season	MWCT	AHAC	CAHL	FAHL/FHL	ECAHA	WPHL	IPHL	OPHL	CHA	NHA	PCHA	WCHL/WHL	Champion / Stanley Cup Champion
1883	1883												McGill University
1884	1884												Montreal Victorias
1885	1885												Montreal Hockey Club
1886	(Note: In lieu of the canceled MWCT, a tournament took place at the Burlington Winter Carnival)	(Note: Before the formation of the AHAC the teams participated in the Dominion Championship)											Montreal Hockey Club; Montreal Crystals
1887	1887	1887											Montreal Hockey Club; Montreal Crystals
1888	(Note: The MWCT was cancelled this year)	1888											Montreal Hockey Club
1889	1889	1888–89											Montreal Victorias; Montreal Hockey Club
1890		1890											Montreal Hockey Club
1891		1891											Montreal Hockey Club
1892		1892											Ottawa Hockey Club; Montreal Hockey Club
1893		1893											Montreal Hockey Club
1894		1894											Montreal Hockey Club
1895		1895											Montreal Hockey Club; Montreal Victorias
1896		1896											Winnipeg Victorias
1897		1897				1896–97							Montreal Victorias
1898		1898											Montreal Victorias
1899			1899			1898–99							Montreal Shamrocks
1900			1900			1899–1900							Montreal Shamrocks
1901			1901			1901							Winnipeg Victorias
1902			1902			1902							Winnipeg Victorias; Montreal Hockey Club
1903			1903			1903							Montreal Hockey Club; Ottawa Hockey Club
1904			1904	1904		1904							Ottawa Hockey Club
1905			1905	1904–05			1904–05						Ottawa Hockey Club
1906				1905–06	1906		1905–06						Ottawa Hockey Club; Montreal Wanderers
1907				1906–07	1907		1906–07						Montreal Wanderers; Kenora Thistles; Montreal Wanderers
1908				1908	1907–08	1908		1908					Montreal Wanderers
1909				1909	1909	1909		1909					Montreal Wanderers; Ottawa Hockey Club
1910								1910	1910	1910			Ottawa Hockey Club; Montreal Wanderers
1911								1911		1910–11			Ottawa Hockey Club
1912										1911–12	1912		Quebec Bulldogs
1913										1912–13	1912–13		Quebec Bulldogs
1914										1913–14	1913–14		Toronto Blueshirts
1915										1914–15	1914–15		Vancouver Millionaires
1916										1915–16	1915–16		Montreal Canadiens
1917										1916–17	1916–17		Seattle Metropolitans
1918											1917–18		Toronto
1919											1919		no decision
1920											1919–20		Ottawa Senators
1921											1920–21		Ottawa Senators
1922											1921–22	1921–22	Toronto St. Pats
1923											1922–23	1922–23	Ottawa Senators
1924											1923–24	1923–24	Montreal Canadiens
1925												1924–25	Victoria Cougars
1926												1925–26	Montreal Maroons

Notes

- The Montreal Winter Carnival ice hockey tournaments (MWCT) were a series of annual tournaments held in the 1880s in conjunction with the Montreal Winter Carnival, in Montreal, Quebec, Canada. First held in 1883, these tournaments are considered to be the first championship ice hockey tournaments and the predecessor to the first championship ice hockey league, the Amateur Hockey Association of Canada.
- The Amateur Hockey Association of Canada (AHAC) existed from 1886 to 1898. Season series play started in 1893.
- The Manitoba Hockey Association existed from 1892 to 1923. The association organized the Manitoba Professional Hockey League in 1906.
- The Canadian Amateur Hockey League (CAHL) existed from 1899 to 1905.
- The Federal Amateur Hockey League (FAHL/FHL) existed from 1904 to 1909. The league was professional from 1908 onwards.
- The Eastern Canada Amateur Hockey Association (ECAHA) existed from 1906 to 1909. The league allowed professional players from 1907 onwards, becoming fully professional in the 1909 season.
- The Western Pennsylvania Hockey League (WPHL) existed from 1896 to 1909. It was the first league to officially allow professional players.
- The International Professional Hockey League (IPHL) existed from 1904 until 1907.
- The Ontario Professional Hockey League (OPHL) existed from 1908 until 1911.
- The Canadian Hockey Association (CHA) existed in 1910 for part of one season.
- The National Hockey Association (NHA) existed from 1910 to 1917.
- The Pacific Coast Hockey Association (PCHA) existed from 1911 to 1924.
- The Western Canada Hockey League (WCHL) existed from 1921 to 1926. While the WCHL wasn't a pre-NHL league, it is generally deemed by hockey historians to have been a major league. Two years prior to its folding, the PCHA merged with it. The last season, 1925–26, it had been renamed the Western Hockey League because one of its teams had moved to the United States. The NHL would buy the rights to the WHL players as part of its disbanding.
- Prior to 1905 (FAHL), 1910 (NHA) and 1912 (PCHA) league play started in January and ended in March of one calendar year.
- The Stanley Cup was first awarded in 1893.
- Prior to 1915, championships could be won or lost during a season through challenge play. Hence, multiple championship holders were possible during each season.

== See also ==
- List of Stanley Cup champions
- List of NHL seasons
- List of WHA seasons
