= Douglas Shearer =

Canadian sound designer and recording director

- Born: Douglas Graham Shearer; November 17, 1899; Westmount, Quebec, Canada
- Died: January 5, 1971 (aged 71); Culver City, California, U.S.
- Occupations: Sound designer, sound director
- Years active: 1928–1968
- Spouses: Marion B. Tilden (m. 1922; died 1931) Ann Cunningham (m. 1932, died) Avice Curry (m. 1968)
- Children: 2
- Relatives: Andrew Shearer (father); Norma Shearer (sister); Athole Shearer (sister); Cresswell Shearer (uncle)

Douglas Graham Shearer (November 17, 1899 – January 5, 1971) was a Canadian American pioneering sound designer and recording director who played a key role in the advancement of sound technology for motion pictures. The elder brother of actress Norma Shearer, he won seven Academy Awards for his work. In 2008, he was inducted into Canada's Walk of Fame.

== Early life and career ==
Shearer was born in Westmount, Quebec, to a prominent family that fell on hard times after his father's business failed, which ultimately led to his parents' separation. Douglas remained with his father Andrew in Montreal while his two younger sisters, Norma Shearer (the Metro-Goldwyn-Mayer star) and Athole Shearer (also a Hollywood actress and one-time wife of director Howard Hawks), moved to the United States—to New York City—with their mother, Edith.

Unable to afford a university education, Douglas Shearer left school and began working in a variety of jobs. In 1924, he traveled to Hollywood, California, to visit his mother and sisters, who had moved there a few years earlier. He decided to remain there too, finding a job at Metro-Goldwyn-Mayer, where Norma was already under contract.

At MGM, working as an assistant in the studio's camera department, he pursued an interest in adding sound to film. That interest led to a career that spanned more than four decades in motion pictures. "What I knew about sound you could have put in a nutshell," he said. "Overnight I became the one-man sound department. They ordered me to do the job; they didn't give it to me. And probably they wouldn't have given it to me except that they were desperate."

Douglas became a significant inventor and innovator in sound technology, with one of his many contributions being a system he developed that eliminated unwanted background noise. Over his long career, Shearer was nominated twenty-one times for Academy Awards, winning seven Oscars for Sound and Special Effects. As the department head, he is credited as recording director in most of the films that MGM produced between 1930 and 1953, although others often performed the work.

Shearer was appointed the studio's director of technical research in 1955; and by the time he retired in 1968 Shearer had won an additional seven Scientific or Technical Academy Awards. In summing up his career, The Film Encyclopedia by Ephraim Katz (2001) states that "during his more than 40 years with MGM he contributed more than any other man in Hollywood to the perfection of motion picture sound."

== Personal life ==
Shearer married Marion B. Tilden in Montreal in September 1922. She died on June 6, 1931, and the following year he married Ann Cunningham in California. In its October 4, 1932 issue, the trade paper The Film Daily announced that "Douglas Shearer, head of the M-G-M sound department...has returned [to Hollywood] from an 'aerial honeymoon' with his bride, formerly Ann Cunningham, also of the studio staff." The couple had two sons, Mark and Stephen. Later he married Avice Curry.

== Death ==
Shearer died in Culver City, California, in 1971.

== Awards and nominations ==
Scientific and Technical Academy Award

- 7 wins

Academy Award for Sound (Wins):

- The Big House (1930)
- Naughty Marietta (1935)
- San Francisco (1936)
- Strike Up the Band (1940)
- The Great Caruso (1951)

Academy Award for Best Visual Effects (Wins):

- Thirty Seconds Over Tokyo (1944)
- Green Dolphin Street (1947)

Academy Award for Sound (Nominations):

- Viva Villa! (1934)
- Maytime (1937)
- Sweethearts (1938)
- Balalaika (1939)
- The Chocolate Soldier (1941)
- Mrs. Miniver (1942)
- Madame Curie (1943)
- Kismet (1944)
- They Were Expendable (1945)
- Green Dolphin Street (1947)

Academy Award for Best Special Effects (Nominations):

- The Wizard of Oz (1939)
- Boom Town (1940)
- Flight Command (1941)
- Mrs. Miniver (1942)

== See also ==
- Canadian pioneers in early Hollywood
- Recording Director
