= Robert Jones (ice hockey) =

Canadian ice hockey player

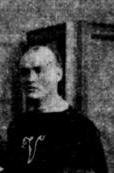
- Jones in the 1895 Montreal Victorias team picture
- Born: June 19, 1867; Montreal, Quebec, Canada
- Died: Unknown
- Position: Goaltender
- Played for: Montreal Victorias
- Playing career: 1888–1896

Robert Wilkes Jones (June 19, 1867 – ?) was a notable Canadian ice hockey player of the pre-NHL era of the sport. He played the position of goaltender for the Montreal Victorias and was a member of a Stanley cup winning team.

== Playing career ==
Robert Jones was a pioneer goaltender in organized hockey. His career is documented beginning in 1889 with the Montreal Victorias. Though his success would not be seen until near the end of his career. Between 1889 and 1894 he only won one game. But things much like the fortune of the Montreal Victorias changed after this point and he was a member of a few winning seasons. Robert was initially the starting goaltender for the Victorias though many other players would often challenge for this position in the early days of hockey. He would once again establish dominance as the team's starting goaltender in 1895. Jones was given the opportunity to start a game with the Montreal Victorias after a string of two losses by the Victorias in 1895 by then goaltender Hartland MacDougall. Jones won the job again by going on a 4-game winning streak securing the Stanley Cup for the Montreal victorias for the first time. After losing the Stanley Cup to Winnipeg in 1896 he did not play again. Gordon Lewis would take over goaltending duties. Jones is known for winning a Stanley Cup. His greatest feat however is his career play statistics near the end of his career. After 1894, Jones played in 13 regular season matches winning 12 games in competition. Jones only played regular goal for the Victorias. He retired after losing the Stanley Cup in 1896.

== Career statistics ==
			Regular season					Playoffs
Season	Team	League	GP	W	L	GA	GAA	GP	W	L	GA	GAA
1888–89	Montreal Victorias	AHAC	1	0	1	6	6.00	--	--	--	--	--
1890	Montreal Victorias	AHAC	3	0	3	8	2.67	--	--	--	--	--
1890–91	Montreal Victorias	AHAC	2	0	2	6	3.00	--	--	--	--	--
1891–92	Montreal Victorias	AHAC	--	--	--	--	--	--	--	--	--	--
1892–93	Montreal Victorias	AHAC	8	1	6	35	4.40	--	--	--	--	--
1893–94	Montreal Victorias	AHAC	1	1	0	3	3.00	--	--	--	--	--
1894–95	Montreal Victorias	AHAC	4	4	0	8	**2.00**	--	--	--	--	--
1895–96	Montreal Victorias	AHAC	8	**7**	1	24	3.00	1	0	1	2	2.00

Notes:

- Lead league in wins in 1895-96 (bold denotes league leader).
- Statistics do not include non regular season tournaments.

== See also ==
- Robert MacDougall
- Hartland MacDougall
