= 1888–89 AHAC season =

- League: Amateur Hockey Association of Canada
- Sport: Ice hockey
- Duration: December 15, 1888 – March 27, 1889
- Teams: 6

1888–89
- Champions: Montreal Hockey Club

AHAC seasons
- ← 1888 1890 →

The 1888–89 AHAC season was the third season of the Amateur Hockey Association of Canada. Play was in challenges and started on December 15, 1888. The Montreal Hockey Club would win the final challenge of the season against the Montreal Victorias to win the Canadian championship for the second season in a row.

== League business ==
The annual meeting of the Amateur Hockey Association was held in the Victoria Skating Rink, Montreal, on November 16, 1888. Representatives from most of the hockey clubs were present. The election for the ensuing year resulted as follows:

- President, Mr. J. Stewart;
- first vice-president, A. Shearer;
- second vice-president, D. B. Holden;
- secretary-treasurer, A. Hodgson.
- Council — H. Kinghorn (McGill), S. Lee (Crystal), T. Arnton (Victoria), A. C. Higginson (Montreal).

=== Rule changes ===
The league reverted to the challenge system, hoping to attract teams from outside Montreal. Quebec would return to play in the AHAC. The number of games was reduced to only four.

The league adopted a rule where the placement of the 'bully' or faceoff, could be played at the point of infringement, or at the point of play stoppage, at the choice of the captain of the offended team after a rules infraction.

== Regular season ==
This season saw two teams from outside of Montreal and Ottawa to make challenges. Halifax(Dartmouth) had not challenged for the national championships before, while Quebec had played in the Montreal tournaments. McGill did not return to mount a challenge this year. Ottawa did not play a challenge, but did play an exhibition against the Montreal Hockey Club in Ottawa.

Halifax Chebuctos would play two games in Montreal, both played half under "Montreal rules", half under "Halifax rules". Halifax would lose 6–1 to Montreal and 4–1 to Crystals. Both games were played at the Crystal Palace skating rink. The two games are recorded in the overall record.

The Chebuctos would play two games against Quebec, losing 8–0 and 5–1.

=== Overall record ===
Note GP = Games Played, W = Wins, L = Losses, T = Ties, GF = Goals For, GA = Goals Against

| Team | GP | W | L | T | GF | GA |
|---|---|---|---|---|---|---|
| Montreal Hockey Club | 7 | 6 | 1 | 0 | 26 | 9 |
| Montreal Crystals | 6 | 3 | 3 | 0 | 17 | 16 |
| Montreal Victorias | 3 | 1 | 2 | 0 | 7 | 11 |
| Quebec Hockey Club | 1 | 0 | 1 | 0 | 2 | 3 |
| McGill University | 1 | 0 | 1 | 0 | 4 | 8 |
| Halifax Chebuctos | 2 | 0 | 2 | 0 | 2 | 10 |

=== Results ===
| Date | Visitor | Score | Home | Score | Location |
|---|---|---|---|---|---|
Exhibition play
| Dec. 15 | Montreal HC | 3 | Victorias | 1 | Victoria Rink |
| Jan. 11 | Crystals | 8 | McGill | 4 | Crystal Rink |
| Jan. 18 | Montreal HC | 2 | Crystals | 1 | Crystal Rink |
| Jan. 31 | Victorias | 5 | Crystals | 2 | Crystal Rink |
| Feb. 25 | Montreal HC | 6 | Chebuctos | 1 | Crystal Rink |
| Feb. 27 | Crystals | 4 | Chebuctos | 1 | Crystal Rink |
Carnival Series
| Feb. 4 | Victorias | 1 | Montreal HC | 1 | Victoria Rink |
| Feb. 9 | Crystals | 7 | McGill | 3 | Victoria Rink |
| Feb. 18 | Victorias | 3 | Crystals | 2 | Victoria Rink |
AHAC Challenge play
| Feb. 2 | Crystals | 3 | Montreal HC | 2 | Crystal Rink |
| Mar. 1 | Montreal HC | 4 | Crystals | 0 | Crystal Rink |
| Mar. 7 | Montreal HC | 3 | Quebec HC | 2 | Crystal Rink |
| Mar. 12 | Montreal HC | 6 | Victorias | 1 | Crystal Rink |

== Player Stats ==
=== Scoring leaders ===
Note: GP = Games played, G = Goals scored

| Name | Club | GP | G |
|---|---|---|---|
| Archie McNaughton | Montreal HC | 5 | 7 |
| Archie Hodgson | Montreal HC | 5 | 6 |
| Sam Lee | Crystals | 4 | 5 |
| Jack Findlay | Montreal HC | 5 | 5 |
| William Virtue | Victorias | 2 | 2 |
| Dave Brown | Crystals | 4 | 2 |
| George Lowe | Montreal HC | 4 | 2 |

=== Goaltending averages ===
Note: GP = Games played, GA = Goals against, SO = Shutouts, GAA = Goals against average

| Name | Club | GP | GA | SO | GAA |
|---|---|---|---|---|---|
| Tom Paton | Montreal HC | 5 | 7 | 0 | 1.17 |
| Jack Norris | Crystals | 3 | 6 | 0 | 2.0 |
| Tom Arnton | Victorias | 1 | 2 | 1 | 2.0 |
| Archie Laurie | Quebec HC | 1 | 3 | 0 | 3.0 |
| Robert Scanlan | Crystals | 1 | 4 | 0 | 4.0 |
| John Brown | Chebuctos | 2 | 10 | 0 | 5.0 |
| Robert Jones | Victorias | 1 | 6 | 0 | 6.0 |

== Montreal HC 1889 AHAC champions ==
Players
Forwards
F. Barlow
Jack Findlay
Archie Hodgson
George S. Low
Archie McNaughton
Defence
Allan Cameron
James A. Stewart
Goaltender
Thomas L. Paton

| Preceded by Montreal HC; 1888 | Montreal Hockey Club; AHAC Champions; 1889 | Succeeded by Montreal HC; 1890 |
| Preceded by 1888 AHAC season | AHAC seasons 1888–89 | Succeeded by 1890 AHAC season |
