= Andrew Shearer (lumber merchant) =

Canadian ice hockey player (1864–1944)

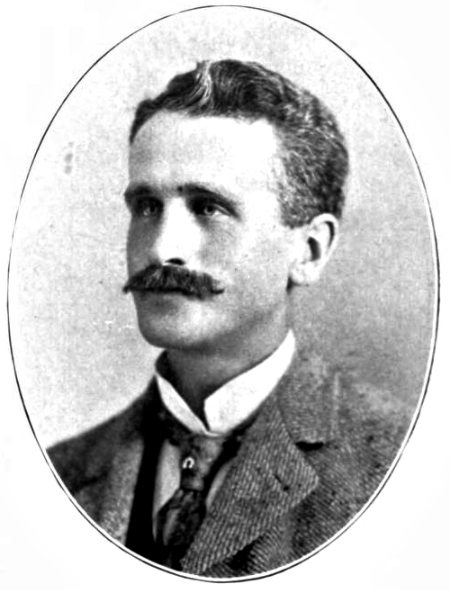
- Photo from Men of Canada, 1901
- Born: January 26, 1864; Montreal, Canada East
- Died: February 6, 1944 (aged 80); Los Angeles, California, U.S.
- Occupation: Lumber merchant
- Spouse: Edith Mary Fisher
- Children: Douglas Shearer; Athole Shearer; Norma Shearer
- Relatives: Cresswell Shearer (brother); Irving Thalberg Jr. (grandson)

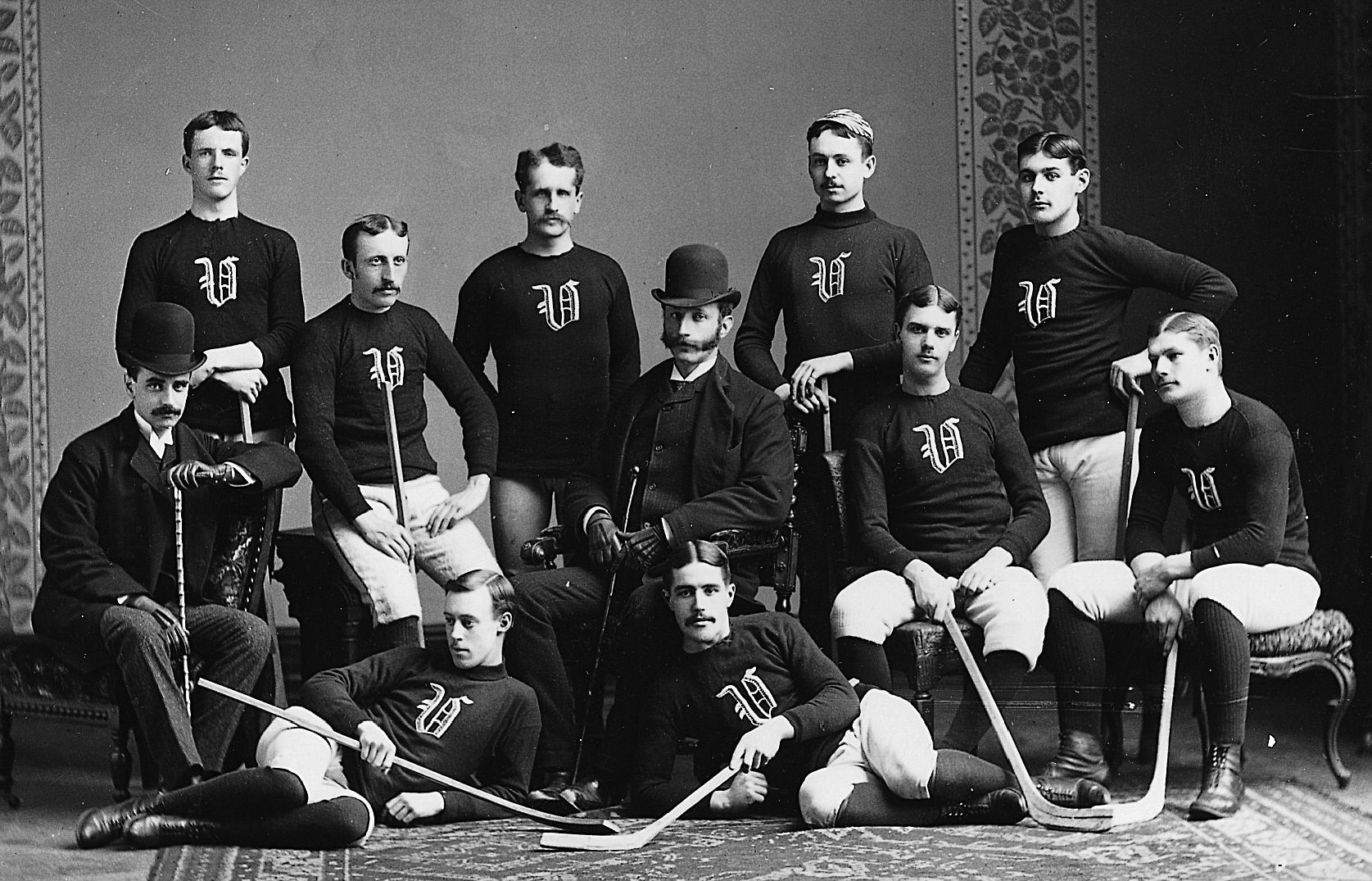
Montreal Victorias ice hockey club in 1888 of which Andrew Shearer was captain. He is standing in the middle of the photograph, second from the left in the back row.

Andrew Shearer (January 26, 1864 – February 6, 1944) was a Canadian lumber merchant and amateur ice hockey player. He was the father of Hollywood actresses Norma and Athole Shearer and sound designer and recording director Douglas Shearer, and an older brother of zoologist Cresswell Shearer.

== Early life ==
Andrew Shearer was born in Montreal, Canada East in 1864 to James Traill Shearer and Eliza Shearer (née Graham). His father was born in Rosegill near Dunnet in Caithnesshire in northern Scotland in 1822 and his mother was born in Montreal in 1827. James T. Shearer was a carpenter and lumber manufacturer and Andrew Shearer later worked as a lumber merchant and as a director of the James Shearer Company in Montreal.

== Personal life ==
Andrew Shearer married Edith Mary (née Fisher) Shearer in Montreal in 1899 and they had three children: Douglas (b. 1899), Athole (b. 1900) and Norma (b. 1902). The family lived in a well-to-do neighborhood of Montreal, but around 1919 the Canadian economy fell into a slump, and he sold the business and lost most of the family money in the deal. He was forced to move the family to a more modest part of Montreal, and his wife Edith soon took her two daughters to New York City to find jobs in the entertainment industry, and Douglas stayed with his father. All of his three children later pursued careers within the film industry in Hollywood, Norma and Athole as actresses and Douglas as a sound designer and recording director. Mental health issues came to plague the family. Andrew Shearer allegedly was prone to manic depression, and Norma described how he "moved like a shadow or a ghost around the house." Both his daughters also came to suffer from mental instabilities.

Andrew Shearer followed his family to California and died in Los Angeles in 1944.

== Career in ice hockey ==
While in his 20s in Montreal Andy Shearer played ice hockey in the Amateur Hockey Association of Canada, an early league organized to determine the Canadian champion. Shearer played with the Montreal Victorias between 1883–1891 and in 1888 he captained the club to a second place finish behind the Montreal Hockey Club, scoring four goals in seven games in the process. Shearer played at the forward position.

=== Statistics ===
			League
Season	Team	League	GP	G
1887	Montreal Victorias	AHAC	6	2
1888	Montreal Victorias	AHAC	7	4
1891	Montreal Victorias	AHAC	2	0
Totals			15	6

Statistics per SIHR at sihrhockey.org

== Career in lumber ==
His father, James T. Shearer, was a carpenter and lumber manufacturer and Andrew Shearer later worked as a lumber merchant and as a director of the James Shearer Company in Montreal. Around 1919, at the tail end of World War I, the Canadian economy fell into a slump, and he sold the business and lost most of the family money in the deal.
