= 1893 AHAC season =

Ice hockey season

- League: Amateur Hockey Association of Canada
- Sport: Ice hockey
- Duration: January 7 – March 17, 1893
- Teams: 5

1893
- Champions: Montreal Hockey Club

AHAC seasons
- ← 1892 1894 →

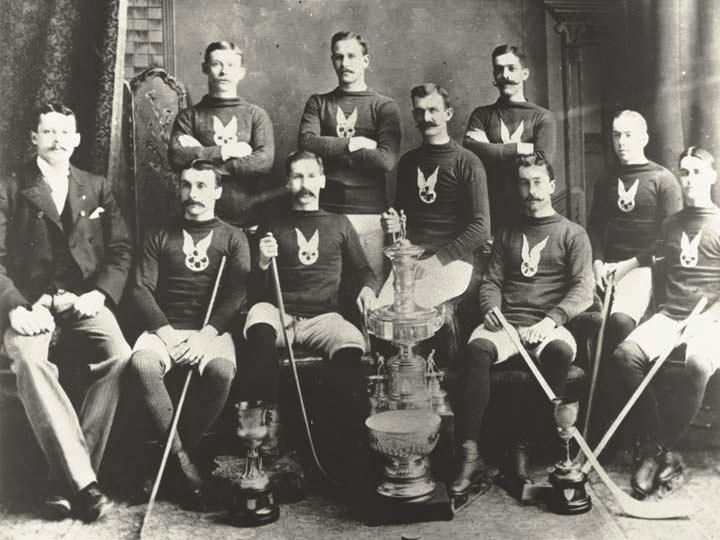
Montreal Hockey Club with the Stanley Cup

The 1893 Amateur Hockey Association of Canada season lasted from January 7 until March 17. The Montreal Hockey Club defeated the Montreal Crystals 2-1 to claim the league and Canadian champion for the sixth season in a row and was awarded the new Stanley Cup without any competition by virtue of their status as AHAC champion.

== Executive ==
On December 15, 1892, the AHAC elected its officers for the season:

- President - F. M. S. Jenkins, Ottawa
- 1st Vice. Pres. - J. Crathern, Victorias
- 2nd Vice. Pres. - A. Laurie, Quebec
- Secretary-Treasurer - J. A. Findlay, Montreal
- Council - A. Ritchie, Crystals; G. Carpenter, Shamrocks; M. Costigan, McGill; A. Z. Palmer, Ottawa Rebels; J. Farwell, Sherbrooke

== Season ==
The season came down to the wire between Montreal Hockey Club (MAAA) and Ottawa Hockey Club (the future Senators). MAAA won the showdown match with Ottawa 7-1 on February 18, then clinched first place on March 10 vs Crystals. However, two disputes needed to be settled at a special meeting on March 13 before the AHAC title was confirmed to MAAA. The meeting took place at the offices of James Caruthers at 3416 Av. du Parc, Montreal (formerly 699 Sherbrooke St.). Both decisions would have an impact as MAAA ended up finishing one game ahead of the Ottawa Hockey Club. Ottawa won the Quebec protest, but Montreal HC were also favored in the protest filed by Crystals, thereby confirming the AHAC championship and (eventually) the first Stanley Cup.

First protest: Ottawa and Quebec got into a dispute. Quebec protested their loss on January 21 in Quebec and refused to play in the return match until the protest was decided. The return match was scheduled for February but was not played until March 17. However, the matter was ruled in favor of Ottawa. At the same time, Ottawa was in a dispute with the Ontario Hockey Association over the location of the final match for the Ontario championship. In the end, Ottawa seceded from the Ontario association.

Second protest: In the March 3 game between MAAA and Crystals, a Crystals player was sent off and the penalty carried over into overtime. Crystals tried to argue that the overtime consisted of a new game and that they should be restored to full strength. They decided to not play the overtime. An unlikely protest said the papers. It was denied and MAAA was credited with the victory.

The end result was that MAAA was declared AHAC champions, and would eventually be handed the Stanley Cup. It is not clear if they knew they were also playing for Lord Stanley's Cup, which had been donated the year before, but they were aware it was an AHAC clinching game. It would be known as the Dominion Challenge Cup until April 30 when the Board of Trustees released rules for the "Stanley Hockey Championship Cup" and announced that MAAA's name was already engraved on the Cup and that it would soon be presented to them.

=== Final standing ===
Note GP = Games Played, W = Wins, L = Losses, T = Ties, GF = Goals For, GA = Goals Against

Team	GP	W	L	T	GF	GA
Montreal Hockey Club	8	7	1	0	38	18
Ottawa Hockey Club	8	6	2	0	49	22
Montreal Crystals	8	3	5	0	25	34
Quebec Hockey Club	8	2	5	1	23	46
Montreal Victorias	8	1	6	1	20	35

=== Results ===
Month	Day	Visitor	Score	Home	Score	Location
Jan.	7	Ottawa HC	3	Victorias	4	Victoria Rink
Jan.	13	Quebec HC	3	Crystals	8	Crystal Rink
Jan.	14	Montreal HC	2	Ottawa HC	4	Rideau Rink
Jan.	14	Quebec HC	1	Victorias	1	Victoria Rink
Jan.	18	Crystals	3	Victorias	1	Victoria Rink
Jan.	21	Ottawa HC	5	Quebec HC	3	Quebec Skating Rink
Jan.	23	Montreal HC	7	Victorias	5	Victoria Rink
Jan.	28	Victorias	2	Ottawa HC	7	Rideau Rink
Jan.	28	Montreal HC	3	Quebec HC	2	Quebec Skating Rink
Feb.	3	Ottawa HC	4	Crystals	3	Crystal Rink
Feb.	4	Victorias	3	Quebec HC	4	Quebec Skating Rink
Feb.	10	Quebec HC	2	Montreal HC	9	Victoria Rink
Feb.	11	Crystals	1	Ottawa HC	11	Rideau Rink
Feb.	18	Crystals	3	Quebec HC	8	Quebec Skating Rink
Feb.	18	Ottawa HC	1	Montreal HC	7	Victoria Rink
Feb.	23	Victorias	3	Crystals	4	Crystal Rink
Mar.	3 (†)	Crystals	2	Montreal HC	2	Victoria Rink
Mar.	4	Montreal HC	6	Victorias	1	Victoria Rink
Mar.	10 (††)	Montreal HC	2	Crystals	1	Crystal Rink
Mar.	17	Quebec HC	0	Ottawa HC	14	Rideau Rink

† Game awarded to Montreal because Crystals refused to continue.

†† Montreal clinches league championship.

Source: Trail of the Stanley Cup, Vol. 1.

== Player Stats ==
=== Scoring leaders ===
Note: GP = Games played, G = Goals scored

Name	Club	GP	G
Haviland Routh	Montreal HC	8	12
Reginald Bradley	Ottawa HC	8	11
AE Dolly Swift	Quebec HC	8	11
Chauncey Kirby	Ottawa HC	8	10
William Murray	Montreal Crystals	7	9
Shirley Davidson	Montreal Victorias	6	8
Jack Kerr	Ottawa HC	7	7
Billy Barlow	Montreal HC	7	7
Archie Hodgson	Montreal HC	8	7
Dave Brown	Montreal Crystals	7	7

Coleman(1966) pp. 9–10

=== Goaltending averages ===
Note: GP = Games played, GA = Goals against, SO = Shutouts, GAA = Goals against average

Name	Club	GP	GA	SO	GAA
Tom Paton	Montreal HC	8	18	0	2.3
Albert Morel	Ottawa HC	8	22	1	2.8
Herbert Collins	Crystals	8	34	1	4.3
Robert Jones	Victorias	8	35	0	4.4
Harry Patton	Quebec HC	7	32	0	4.6
Frank Stocking	Quebec HC	1	14	0	14.0

== Championship ==
Montreal HC won the championship for placing first in the regular season. This was Montreal HC's third straight championship since the Championship Trophy was inaugurated in 1891. According to the terms for the trophy, Montreal HC was allowed to keep the Trophy. A new version was struck for following seasons (this new version is on display at the MAA building at 2070 rue Peel Street, Montreal). The version won 1891-1893 that was gifted to Montreal is on display in the collection of the Hockey Hall of Fame.

As champions of the AHAC, the Dominion Hockey Challenge Cup (known today as the Stanley Cup) was to be awarded to Montreal as its inaugural champion. On May 15, 1893, Sheriff John Sweetland finally presented the trophy to the MAAA president J. A. Taylor during the MAAA annual meeting at the Montreal Gymnasium SW corner of Mansfield and de Maisonneuve in Montreal. This was the first MAAA clubhouse before they moved to Peel Street in 1905. Each player received a souvenir gold ring as a gift of the MAAA. Disputes between the Montreal HC and the MAAA kept the Cup in the MAAA hands until it was accepted by the Club on February 23, 1894.

Therefore, contrary to what was previously believed, the first Stanley Cup was not awarded at the Victoria Skating Rink but at Crystal Rink on March 10, 1893, at the SE corner of what is now Boulevard René-Lévesque Ouest {then Dorchester} & Rue Guy in Montreal. The rink was inset eastward from Guy, closer to Mackay, but the lot took up the entire corner. This was not the original Crystal Palace, which had stood where the Palace Theatre would later be built on Sainte-Catherine Street, and was dismantled and relocated to what is now Mile End in 1878. We know it was at the Dorchester rink because the owner of Crystals was "Genial" Sam Robertson, who also owned the Dorchester Street rink.

The March 11, 1893 Montreal Daily Star (see image to the right) demonstrates that the Montreal Hockey Club understood the stakes: a victory that night would secure the AHAC trophy as regular season champions. The Stanley Cup itself was yet to be formally named and had been donated the previous year by Governor-General Lord Stanley of Preston, and the players possibly knew it also was on the line — the Cup appears prominently in the team's 1893 photograph (see above), positioned in front of the AHAC trophy. No playoff existed yet to determine a champion (unless a tie-breaker was needed); the title went to whoever finished atop the regular season standings. That would change the following year, when hockey's first playoff was held at the Victoria Skating Rink in Montreal.

So, there are really four points of interest in Montreal when it comes to the first Stanley Cup.

1. MAAA/MHC defeated Ottawa Hockey Club 7-1, in what effectively was the championship game at Victoria Skating Rink (site on Stanley Street in downtown Montreal) on February 18, 1893.

2. MHC defeated Crystals at Crystal Palace (SE corner of what is now Boulevard René-Lévesque Ouest & Rue Guy in Montreal) to clinch first place and the AHAC championship (and the Stanley Cup) on March 10.

3. However, two disputes needed to be settled at a special meeting on March 13 before the AHAC title was confirmed to MHC. The meeting took place at the offices of James Caruthers at 3416 Av. du Parc, Montreal (formerly 699 Sherbrooke St.). Both decisions would have an impact as MHC ended up finishing one game ahead of the Ottawa Hockey Club. Ottawa won the Quebec protest, but MHC were also favored in the protest filed by Crystals, thereby confirming the AHAC championship and (eventually) the first Stanley Cup.

4. On May 15, 1893, Sheriff John Sweetland finally presented the trophy to the MAAA president J. A. Taylor during the MAAA annual meeting at the Montreal Gymnasium SW corner of Mansfield and de Maisonneuve in Montreal.

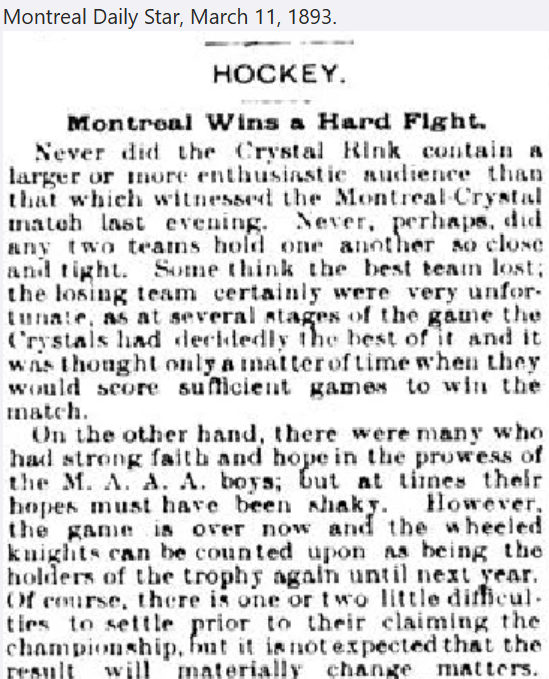
Montreal Daily Star, March 11, 1893 — reporting on the Crystal Rink game that decided both the AHAC title and the first Stanley Cup.

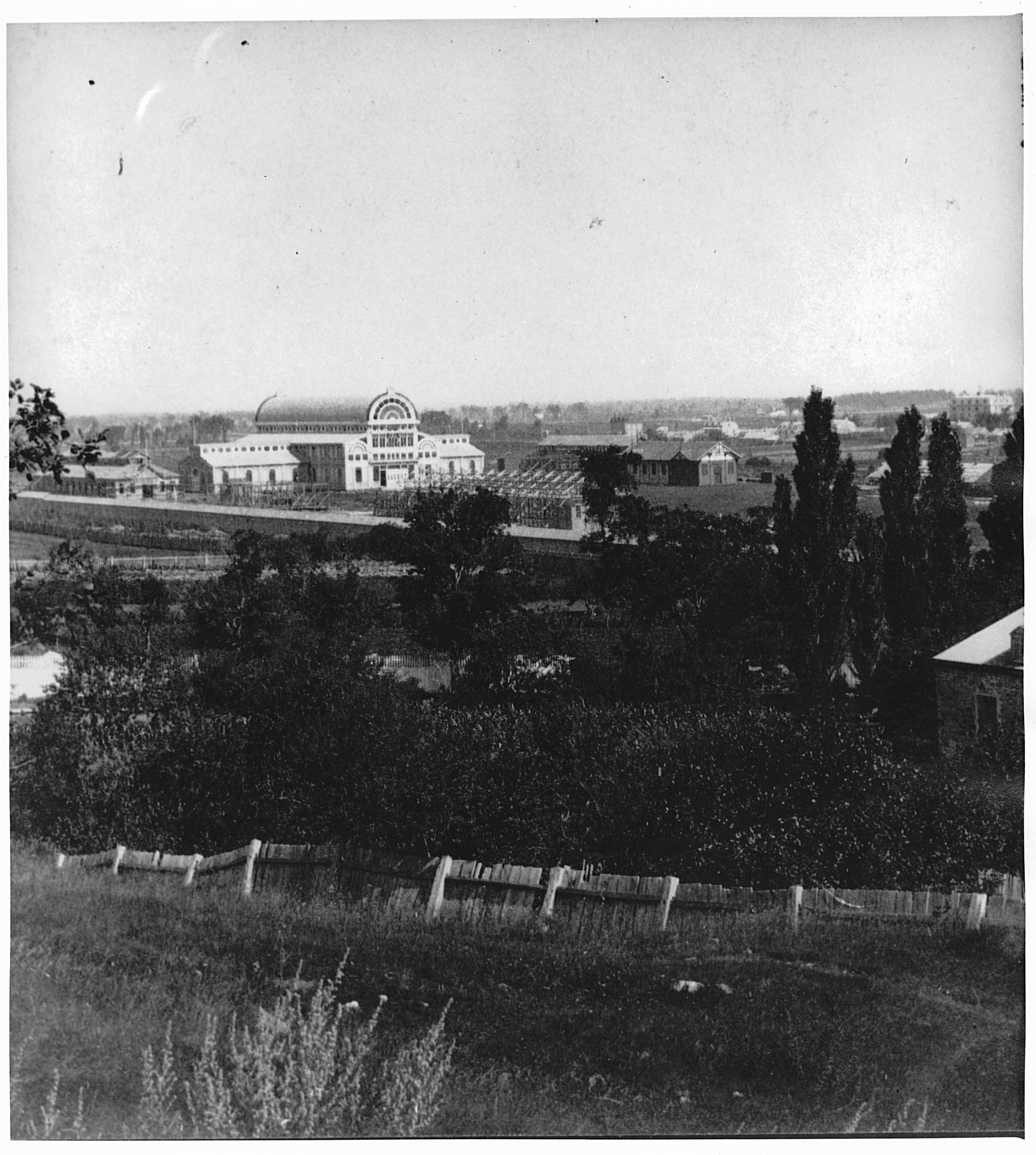
The second Crystal Palace, Fletcher's Field, Montreal, 1880.

== Stanley Cup engraving ==
1893 Montreal Amateur Athletic Association
Players
Forwards
Billy Barlow ^
Archie Hodgson ^
"Harvie" Routh ^
Alex Kingan ^
Alex Irving ^
George Lowe ^
Defencemen
Allan Cameron (point)
† James A. Stewart (cover point
Goaltender
Tom Paton

- ^ Unknown who played Center, Rover, Right Wing and Left Wing, so the players are listed as forwards

non-players=

- Harry L. Shaw (Manager/Secretary-Treasurer)
- James Taylor (President of AAA) (Missing from team picture)

== See also ==
- List of pre-NHL seasons
- List of Stanley Cup champions

Preceded by Montreal HC; 1892	Montreal Hockey Club; AHAC Champions; 1893	Succeeded by Montreal HC; 1894
Preceded by first winners	Montreal Hockey Club; Stanley Cup Champions; 1893	Succeeded by Montreal HC; 1894
Preceded by 1892 AHAC season	AHAC seasons 1893	Succeeded by 1894 AHAC season
