= 1887 AHAC season =

- League: Amateur Hockey Association of Canada
- Sport: Ice hockey
- Duration: January 6 – March 11, 1887
- Teams: 5

1887
- Champions: Montreal Crystals

AHAC seasons
- ← (first season) 1888 →

The 1887 AHAC season was the inaugural season of the Amateur Hockey Association of Canada. Play was in challenges. The Montreal Crystals defeated the Montreal Victorias to win the final challenge of the season to claim the Canadian championship and the first league championship.

== League business ==
The AHAC was organized on December 8, 1886, when the representatives of various hockey clubs met at the Victoria Skating Rink in Montreal at the instigation of the Victoria Hockey Club of Montreal. The first executive was composed of:

- President: Thomas D. Green, Ottawa.
- First vice-president: Jack Arnton, Victorias.
- Second vice-president: Robert Laing, Crystals.
- Secretary-treasurer: E. Stevenson, Victorias.
- Council: James Stewart, Crystals; J. G. Monk, Victorias; Hanbury A. Budden, McGill; E. Sheppard, M.A.A.A.: Percy Myles, Ottawa.

== Regular season ==
A.E. Swift from the Quebec HC played four games for the Victorias, being possibly the first hockey player to play for a city other than their home.

The season's final match, held in the Victoria Rink on March 11 ended 3–2 for Montreal Crystals over the Montreal Victorias. The Vics had won the previous two meetings between the clubs. The Crystals changed their lineup, replacing F. Dowd, R. Laing and J. McGoldrick. The Crystals took the early lead on two goals by S. McQuisten. The Vics appeared to score a goal, but it was ruled to be too high and did not count. In the second half, D. Brown, one of the replacements, scored the third for Crystals before two goals by T. Arnton made it close.

=== Overall record ===
Note GP = Games Played, W = Wins, L = Losses, T = Ties, GF = Goals For, GA = Goals Against

Team	GP	W	L	T	GF	GA
Montreal Victorias	8	6	2	0	27	11
Montreal Crystals†	5	2	3	0	7	12
Montreal HC	2	1	1	0	6	5
Ottawa HC	1	0	1	0	1	5
McGill University	2	0	2	0	1	9

† National Champion

Source: Ultimate Hockey

=== Results ===
Date	Team	Score	Team	Score	Location
Challenge play
Jan. 6	Victorias	0	Montreal HC	4	Victoria Rink
Jan. 7	Crystals	3	McGill	1	Crystal Rink
Jan. 14	Crystals	0	Victorias	4	Crystal Rink
Jan. 21	Victorias	5	Montreal HC	2	Victoria Rink
Jan. 27	Victorias	5	Ottawa HC	1	Victoria Rink
Feb. 4	Victorias	3	Crystals	0	Victoria Rink
Feb. 12	Victorias	6	McGill	0	Victoria Rink
Feb. 24	Victorias	2	Crystals	1	Victoria Rink
Mar. 11	Victorias	2	Crystals	3	Victoria Rink

Montreal Crystals final champions of the season.

Source: Montreal Gazette

== Player Stats ==
=== Scoring leaders ===
Note: GP = Games played, G = Goals scored

Name	Club	GP	G
Albert Swift	Victorias	4	8
Billy Hodgson	Montreal HC	4	4
J. Craven	Victorias	6	4
Jack Campbell	Victorias	7	3
Frank Dowd	Crystals	3	2
Sam McQuisten	Crystals	3	2
John Findley	Montreal HC	4	2
Jack Arnton	Victorias	5	2
Andy Shearer	Victorias	7	2

=== Goaltender averages ===
Note: GP = Games played, GA = Goals against, SO = Shutouts, GAA = Goals against average

Name	Club	GP	GA	SO	GAA
Tom Arnton	Victorias	7	7	3	1.0
Tom Paton	Montreal HC	1	2	0	2.0
W. Norris	Crystals	3	7	0	2.3
George Boon	Crystals	2	5	0	2.5
Albert Shanks	McGill	1	3	0	3.0
William Hutchinson	Montreal HC	1	3	0	3.0
Albert Low	Ottawa HC	1	5	0	5.0
C.H. McNutt	McGill	1	6	0	6.0

== Winter Carnival Tournament ==
In February, the Montreal teams of the AHAC participated in the Montreal Winter Carnival ice hockey tournament. The tournament, which was scheduled to play outdoors on an ice rink at the Ice Palace, was disrupted by two days of storms, and was not completed until February 25. During this time, no AHAC challenges were played.

Date	Team	Score	Team	Score	Location
Exhibitions
February 7	Victorias	2	Montreal HC	0	Victoria Rink
February 11	Crystals	5	Montreal HC (second)	0	Crystal Rink
"Tournament" (second teams)
February 17	Crystals	6	Montreal HC	3	Crystal Rink
February 23	Victorias	5	McGill	1	Victoria Rink
February 25	Victorias	1	Montreal HC	1	Victoria Rink
Tournament
February 21	Crystals	0	Montreal HC	1	Crystal Rink
February 23	Victorias	8	McGill	0	Crystal Rink
February 25	Victorias	0	Montreal HC	1	Crystal Rink

Montreal HC wins Winter Carnival Tournament.

Source: The Montreal Gazette, The Montreal Daily Herald, Montreal Daily Witness, The Montreal Daily Post

Preceded by first winners	Montreal Crystals; AHAC Champions; 1887	Succeeded by Montreal HC; 1888
Preceded by first season	AHAC seasons 1887	Succeeded by 1888 AHAC season
