= Athole Shearer =

Canadian American actress and socialite (1900–1985)

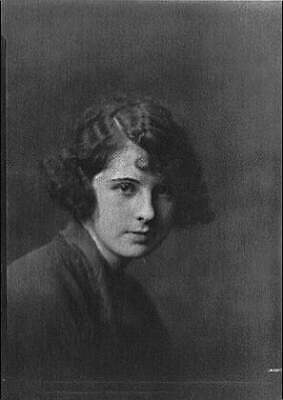
- Shearer in 1920
- Born: Athole Dane Shearer; November 20, 1900; Montreal, Quebec, Canada
- Died: March 17, 1985 (aged 84); Los Angeles, California, U.S.
- Resting place: Forest Lawn Memorial Park Cemetery, Glendale, California, U.S.
- Years active: 1920
- Spouses: John Ward (m. 1923; div. 1928) Howard Hawks (m. 1928; div. 1940)
- Children: 3
- Father: Andrew Shearer
- Relatives: Norma Shearer (sister); Douglas Shearer (brother); Cresswell Shearer (uncle); Irving Thalberg Jr. (nephew); Kenneth Hawks (brother-in-law); William Hawks (brother-in-law); Mary Astor (sister-in-law); Bessie Love (sister-in-law)

Athole Dane Shearer Hawks (November 20, 1900 – March 17, 1985) was a Canadian-American actress and socialite, who was the sister of motion picture star Norma Shearer and MGM film sound engineer Douglas Shearer.

== Early life ==
Athole Dane Shearer was born in 1900 in Montreal, Quebec. Her parents divorced when she was a teenager, her brother Douglas remained with their father Andrew in Canada, and she and her sister Norma moved to New York City with their mother Edith. The latter hoped to get her daughters into show business.

== Film career ==
In 1920, the sisters appeared as extras and in bit parts in productions filmed in New York, New Jersey, and Florida, but Edith moved with them to California with the intention of securing contracts with one of the studios in Hollywood.

Shearer's appearances in productions in the eastern United States consisted of only small uncredited roles in three films, the first being as a schoolgirl in The Flapper, a silent comedy released by Selznick Pictures Corporation. In California, Athole's acting career essentially ended, never achieving the success experienced by Norma at Metro-Goldwyn-Mayer.

== Bipolar disorder ==
A contributing factor to Shearer's limited work in motion pictures was her persistent medical issues, most notably her long struggle with bipolar disorder, from which her father most likely also suffered. (Note: Norma Shearer described how their father used to move like a "shadow or a ghost" around the house.) Her condition and personal problems associated with the illness proved to be detrimental to her film career. Ultimately, Shearer spent many years in mental institutions until her disorder was diagnosed.

== Personal life ==
In 1923, Shearer married John Ward, with whom she had a son, Peter. The couple divorced in 1928; and on May 30 that year she married again, this time to film director Howard Hawks, with whom she had two more children: David, born in 1929, and Barbara, born in 1935. She and Hawks divorced in 1940, reportedly due to Hawks' affair with New York and Hollywood socialite Nancy "Slim" Gross, whom he later married.

== Death ==
Shearer died in 1985 in Los Angeles, and she was interred in the Forest Lawn Memorial Park Cemetery in Glendale, California.

== Filmography ==
- The Flapper (1920)
- Way Down East (1920)
- The Restless Sex (1920)

== See also ==
- Other Canadian pioneers in early Hollywood
