= Billy Barlow =

Canadian amateur ice hockey player

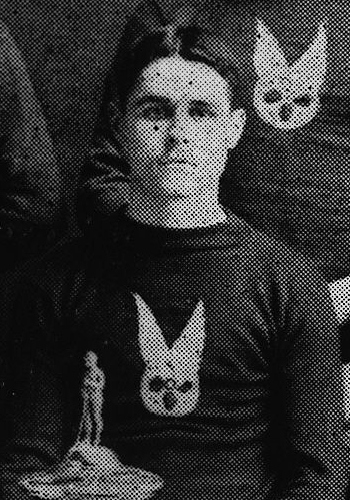
- Barlow in 1894.
- Born: November 2, 1870; Montreal, Quebec, Canada
- Died: February 14, 1963 (aged 92); Notre-Dame-de-Grâce, Quebec, Canada
- Weight: 140 lb (64 kg; 10 st 0 lb)
- Position: Rover
- AHAC team: Montreal Hockey Club
- Playing career: 1893–1897

William McKenzie Barlow (November 2, 1870 – February 14, 1963) was a Canadian amateur ice hockey player active in the late 1800s. He was a member of the Montreal Hockey Club, which dominated the Amateur Hockey Association of Canada (AHAC) between 1888 and 1897 and became the inaugural Stanley Cup champions in 1893. Barlow is recognized for scoring the first-ever Stanley Cup-winning goal during the decisive playoff game in 1894.

== Personal ==
Born in Montreal, Barlow attended Belmont School for his education. In addition to playing ice hockey, he also competed in lacrosse with the Montreal AAA. He married Winnifred Amelia Sully, and together they had two children: a son named Gerald and a daughter named Doris, known as Dodie. During the 1930s, Barlow served as a director at Lymans Limited, a pharmaceutical company, and later held the role of secretary at the Welfare Foundation until his retirement in 1949. He died at his home in Notre-Dame-de-Grâce on February 14, 1963, and was laid to rest at Mount Royal Cemetery.

== Hockey career ==
In recognition of his contribution to the Montreal Hockey Club's historic victory as the first-ever Stanley Cup champions in 1893, the Montreal Amateur Athletic Association awarded Barlow a special commemorative ring. Years later, the ring was generously donated to the Hockey Hall of Fame by Barlow's daughter, Dodie Cox (née Barlow), where it remains on display as an important artifact from the early days of the sport. Beyond his accomplishments as a player, Barlow continued to be involved in hockey by serving as a referee in games organized by the AHAC.

=== Career statistics ===
			Regular season		Playoffs
Season	Team	League	GP	G	GP	G
1893	Montreal Hockey Club	AHAC	7	7	–	–
1894	Montreal Hockey Club	AHAC	8	8	2	4
1895	Montreal Hockey Club	AHAC	8	4	–	–
1896	Montreal Hockey Club	AHAC	8	5	–	–
1897	Montreal Hockey Club	AHAC	8	10	–	–

Source: Coleman (1966)

== See also ==
- List of Stanley Cup champions

== References and notes ==
- "CANADA'S HOCKEY PLAYERS; Two Teams That Are to Play Games in This Country" (PDF). New York Times. March 2, 1894. p. 5.
- Coleman, Charles (1966). Trail of the Stanley Cup, vol.1, 1893-1926 inc. National Hockey League.
