= Canadian pioneers in early Hollywood =

Motion pictures have been a part of the culture of Canada since the industry began.

== History ==
Around 1910, the East Coast filmmakers began to take advantage of the mild California winter climates, and after Nestor Studios, run by Canadian Al Christie, built the first permanent movie studio in Hollywood, a number of the movie companies expanded or relocated to the new Hollywood. At the same time, because there was no sound in movies, several French filmmakers had their motion pictures distributed in the United States.

== List of Canadian film pioneers in Hollywood ==
Among those Canadians who took part in the early years of Hollywood were:

- Maud Allan (1873-1956), actress and dancer, popularizer of the role of Salome, later played by Theda Bara and Alla Nazimova
- Allakariallak (1890s–1924?), Inuk actor and subject of Nanook of the North
- Charles Arling (1880–1922), actor
- Earl W. Bascom (1906-1995), actor, artist; worked with Roy Rogers, worked on Louis B. Mayer's ranch in Perris, California
- William Bertram (1880–1933), actor, director
- Ben Blue (1901–1975), actor, comedian
- Raymond Burr (1917–1993), actor
- Jack Carson (1910–1963), actor
- Peggy Cartwright (1912-2001), actress in Our Gang comedy series and with Harold Lloyd
- Al Christie (1881–1951), co-founder of Christie Film Company, director/producer/screenwriter
- Charles Christie (1880–1955), co-founder of Christie Film Company; builder of Hollywood's first luxury hotel
- Berton Churchill (1876–1940), actor
- Yvonne De Carlo (1922–2007), actress
- Joe De Grasse (1873–1940), director
- Sam De Grasse (1875–1953), actor
- Fifi D'Orsay (1904–1983), actress
- Marie Dressler (1868–1934), actress who won the 1930/31 Academy Award for Best Actress for Min and Bill
- Douglass Dumbrille (1889–1974), moving and television actor
- Deanna Durbin (1921–2013), actress, singer
- Allan Dwan (1885–1981), director, producer, screenwriter
- Edward Earle (1882–1972), actor
- Rockliffe Fellowes (1883–1950), actor
- Glenn Ford (1916–2006), actor
- John Harvey Gahan (1888–1958), as Oscar Gahan, actor, musician, composer; Canada's child prodigy violinist, aka Arvé
- Huntley Gordon (1887–1956), actor
- Lorne Greene (1915–1987), actor; played Ben Cartwight, Commander Adama
- June Havoc (1912-2010), actress, singer, author
- Harry Hayden (1882–1955), actor
- Del Henderson (1883–1956), actor, director, writer
- Walter Huston (1884–1950), actor who won the 1949 Academy Award for Best Supporting Actor for his role in The Treasure of the Sierra Madre
- May Irwin (1862–1938), comedy actress; first screen kiss in 1896
- Victor Jory (1902–1982), actor
- Ruby Keeler (1909–1993), dancer, actress
- Barbara Kent (1907–2011), actress
- Florence La Badie (1888–1917), actress
- Florence Lawrence (1886–1938), actress
- Rosina Lawrence (1912-1997), actress
- Beatrice Lillie (1894–1989), actress
- Gene Lockhart (1891–1957), actor
- Guy Lombardo (1902-1977), band leader who appeared in film musicals
- Del Lord (1894–1970), comedy director
- Wilfred Lucas (1871–1940), director, screenwriter, actor
- Henry MacRae (1876–1944), director, producer, screenwriter, actor
- David Manners (1900–1998), actor
- Raymond Massey (1896–1983), actor
- Louis B. Mayer (1885–1957), co–founder of Metro Goldwyn Mayer Motion Picture Studios
- Bob Nolan (1908–1980), singer/actor in western musicals as leader of "The Sons of the Pioneers"
- Sidney Olcott (1872–1949), film producer, director, actor and screenwriter
- Jack Pickford (1896–1933), actor
- Lottie Pickford (1893–1936), actress
- Mary Pickford (1892–1979), actress known as "America's Sweetheart" who won the 1928/29 Academy Award for Best Actress for Coquette; producer who co–founded United Artists
- Walter Pidgeon (1897–1984), actor
- Marie Prevost (1896–1937), actress
- John Qualen (1899-1987), actor
- William Quinn (1884–1965), actor
- Mack Sennett (1880–1960), director, known as the "King of Comedy"
- Athole Shearer (1900–1985), actress, wife of director Howard Hawks
- Douglas Shearer (1899–1971), sound director/designer, winner of seven Academy Awards
- Norma Shearer (1902–1983), actress who won the 1929/30 Academy Award for Best Actress for The Divorcee
- Nell Shipman (1892–1970), actress, writer, producer
- Jay Silverheels (1912–1980), actor known for his portrayal of Tonto, sidekick to the Lone Ranger
- Alexis Smith (1921–1993), actress
- Ned Sparks (1883–1957), actor
- Richard Travers (1885–1935), actor
- Jack L. Warner (1892–1978), co-founder of Warner Brothers
- Lucile Watson (1879–1962), actress
- Marjorie White (1904–1935), actress
- Joseph Wiseman (1918–2009), actor
- Fay Wray (1907-2004), actress

== Canadian scene in Hollywood ==
In his book Stardust and Shadows: Canadians in Early Hollywood, Charles Foster recounted his experiences meeting some of these Canadians while on leave from the Royal Air Force during World War II. Foster visited Hollywood where he was introduced to Canadian and silent movie director Sidney Olcott. Through Olcott he learned of Hollywood's Canadian community. Although total strangers, young Foster was welcomed with open arms. This social gathering of "Canucks" also included Walter Pidgeon, Deanna Durbin, Fifi D'Orsay, and others who worked in the movie business.

Several of these Canadian pioneers achieved enormous wealth and worldwide fame, such as Louis B. Mayer and Mary Pickford who were, in their day, two of the most powerful personalities in Hollywood. From the late 1920s to the mid-1930s, Canadian female actresses were amongst the greatest box office draws. The Academy Award for Best Actress was won by Canadian women three years in a row:

- 1929 - Mary Pickford in Coquette
- 1930 - Norma Shearer in The Divorcee
- 1931 - Marie Dressler in Min and Bill

Foster recounts the feelings and deep loyalty of Louis B. Mayer. Although he had become a naturalized American citizen, Mayer was known to hire Canadian compatriots on the spot, as Saint John, New Brunswick native Walter Pidgeon later recalled:

Without another word he called his secretary, Ida Koverman. "Ida..." he said, "prepare a contract for this man from Saint John, he will tell you his name, and Ida, add another fifty dollars a week on the contract for a good Canadian." We shook hands and just like that I was under contract to MGM. "You do act, don't you?" he asked. I nodded and left the room.

Several Canadian expatriates also saw their careers decline and died before the age of 55. Florence Lawrence, the "first real movie star", the Biograph Girl in Hollywood history, who appeared in more than 270 movies, committed suicide at the age of 52. She is buried in unmarked grave in the Hollywood Cemetery. Marie Prevost, who was a leading lady during the mid-1920s, suffered from depression after the death of her mother in 1926. In 1937, she died of acute alcoholism and malnutrition at the age of 38. Florence La Badie died of injuries she sustained in a car accident in August 1917 at the age of 29. Jack Pickford, Mary Pickford's younger brother, died at age 36 from what was then known as multiple neuritis, while his sister Lottie died of a heart attack at age 43.
