= Tom Paton (ice hockey) =

Canadian ice hockey player

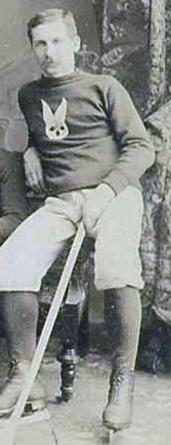
- Paton in 1888
- Born: September 30, 1855 Montreal, Province of Canada
- Died: February 10, 1909 (aged 53)
- Position: Goaltender
- Playing career: 1883–1893

Thomas Laird Paton (September 30, 1855 – February 10, 1909), was a Canadian ice hockey player of the pre-NHL era of the sport. He played the position of goaltender for the Montreal Hockey Club (Montreal HC) (affiliated with the Montreal Amateur Athletic Association) and was a member of the first Stanley Cup-winning team in 1893.

== Playing career ==
Paton was a pioneer goaltender in organized hockey. His hockey career can be traced back to the early Montreal Carnivals prior to the formation of the AHAC in 1885. He was a founding member of the Montreal Hockey Club. His career would be marked by dominance. Throughout every season he played between 1888 and 1893 for the Montreal HC, his team would win the AHAC championship.

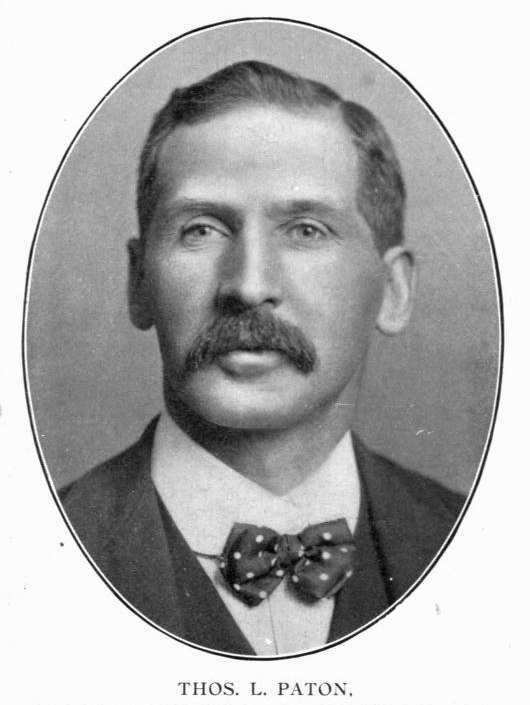
Paton circa 1901

The authors of the reference book Ultimate Hockey consider Paton's performance in 1890, 1891 and 1893 to be worthy of winning the equivalent to the Vezina Trophy that the NHL awards today for top goal tender. He was regarded in many history texts as being undefeated in 1890 and 1891.

In the 1892 AHAC season, Paton and the Montreal HC lost the championship to the Ottawa Hockey Club in the first game of the season. But in the final challenge of the season Paton and the Montreal HC defeated Ottawa 1–0 to regain the championship. In the 1893 AHAC season, the Montreal HC would win the season series and become the first winners of the Stanley Cup. Paton would retire from play after the season, making him also the first goalie to retire from Stanley Cup hockey competition as a current champion.

Paton's 1885 Montreal Carnival championship medal sold for over CA$14,000 in a 2009 auction.

== Post career ==
Paton worked as an agent in manufacturing and in 1901 was president of the Dominion Commercial Travellers' Association in Montreal.

=== Regular season ===
Season	Team	League	GP	W	L	T	MIN	GA	SO	GAA
1885 Montreal Winter Carnival	Montreal HC	AHAC	**4**	**4**	0	1	**240**	2	**3**	**0.50**
1887	Montreal HC	AHAC	1	~	~	~	~	2	0	2.00
1887 Montreal Winter Carnival	Montreal HC	AHAC	1+	~	~	~	~	2	0	2.00
1888	Montreal HC	AHAC	**7**	**6**	1	0	**420**	7	**2**	**1.00**
1888–89	Montreal HC	AHAC	**4**	**3**	1	0	**240**	6	0	**1.50**
1890	Montreal HC	AHAC	**7**	**7**	0	0	**420**	13	0	**1.90**
1890–91	Montreal HC	AHAC	**6**	**6**	0	0	**360**	6	**1**	**1.00**
1891–92	Montreal HC	AHAC	3	1	2	0	180	7	0	2.30
1892–93	Montreal HC	AHAC	8	**7**	1	0	480	18	0	**2.30**
AHAC totals			41	34	6	1	2,360-2,480+	63	6	1.61

=== International ===
Bolded numbers indicate tournament leader.

Year	Team	Event	GP	W	L	T	MIN	GA	SO	GAA
1886	Montreal HC	Burlington Winter Carnival	2	**2**	0	0	70+	0	**2**	**0.00**

Notes:

- Lead league in wins in 1888,89,90,91 and 93 (bold denotes league leader).
- Statistics do not include non regular season tournaments.
- In the first game of the Burlington Winter Carnival series, Richard F. Smith scored an unknown number of minutes into overtime.
