= 1891 AHAC season =

- League: Amateur Hockey Association of Canada
- Sport: Ice hockey
- Duration: January 7 – March 5, 1891
- Teams: 6

1891
- Champions: Montreal Hockey Club

AHAC seasons
- ← 1890 1892 →

The 1891 Amateur Hockey Association of Canada season saw the Montreal Hockey Club win the league and Canadian championship for the fourth straight season by beating the Montreal Crescents 8-2. Ontario launched the Ontario Hockey Association (OHA) as the popularity of the sport spread west. Ottawa, the eventual Ontario champion, played in a challenge with Montreal and lost.

== Season ==
The Dominion Hockey Club did not return to put on a challenge. The Shamrock Athletic Association mounted their first challenge. The Ottawa Hockey Club returned to AHAC play.

=== Overall challenge record ===
Note GP = Games Played, W = Wins, L = Losses, T = Ties, GF = Goals For, GA = Goals Against

Team	GP	W	L	T	GF	GA
Montreal Hockey Club†	8	8	0	0	28	7
Ottawa Hockey Club	1	0	1	0	0	3
Montreal Shamrocks	2	0	2	0	2	9
Montreal Victorias	2	0	2	0	2	6
Montreal Crescents	2	0	2	0	3	10
Quebec Hockey Club	1	0	1	0	0	0

Quebec lost to Montreal by default on January 7. As a result, Quebec was not allowed to issue any additional challenges for the 1891 season.

† National champion. The Montreals retained their championship all season without being defeated.

=== Results ===
Games consisted of a mixture of Challenge games and Exhibition (friendlies)

Date	Visitor	Score	Home	Score	Location
Exhibition play
Dec. 19	McGill	1	Montreal HC	3	Crystal Rink
Jan. 2	Crescents	2	Montreal HC	1	Crystal Rink
Jan. 17	McGill	2	Ottawa HC	3	Rideau Rink
Jan. 29	Crescents	1	Victorias	3	Victoria Rink
Jan. 31	Victorias	0	Ottawa HC	1	Rideau Rink
Feb. 9	McGill	5	Victorias	6	Victoria Rink
AHAC Challenge play
Jan. 7	Quebec HC	--	Montreal HC	--	--
Jan. 19	Victorias	1	Montreal HC	4	Crystal Rink
Jan. 28	Shamrocks	1	Montreal HC	4	Crystal Rink
Feb. 4	Crescents	1	Montreal HC	2	Crystal Rink
Feb. 12	Victorias	1	Montreal HC	2	Crystal Rink
Feb. 21	Ottawa HC	0	Montreal HC	3	Crystal Rink
Feb. 27	Shamrocks	1	Montreal HC	5	Crystal Rink
Mar. 5	Crescents	2	Montreal HC	8	Crystal Rink

Game on January 7 was defaulted to Montreal HC by Quebec. Quebec telegraphed that the team would not show.

== Player Stats ==
=== Scoring leaders ===
Note: GP = games played, G = goals scored

Name	Club	GP	G
Alexander Kingan	Montreal HC	7	5
George Lowe	Montreal HC	6	4
Archie McNaughton	Montreal HC	6	3
Thomas Cafferty	Shamrocks	2	1
Allan Cameron	Montreal HC	6	1
Sam Lee	Montreal HC	1	1
James Kinghorn	Victorias	1	1
Stewart McQuisten	Crescents	2	1
William Warden	Montreal HC	2	1

Source: Ultimate Hockey

17 Goals unaccounted for in statistics

=== Goaltending averages ===
Note: GP = games played, GA = goals against, SO = shutouts, GAA = Goals against average

Name	Club	GP	GA	SO	GAA
Tom Paton	Montreal HC	6	6	1	1.0
Robert Jones	Victorias	2	6	0	3.0
Albert Morel	Ottawa HC	1	3	0	3.0
James McKenna	Shamrocks	2	9	0	4.5

Source: Ultimate Hockey

== See also ==
- 1890–91 Ottawa Hockey Club season

Preceded by Montreal HC; 1890	Montreal Hockey Club; AHAC Champions; 1891	Succeeded by Montreal HC; 1892
Preceded by 1890 AHAC season	AHAC seasons 1891	Succeeded by 1892 AHAC season
