= 1890 AHAC season =

- League: Amateur Hockey Association of Canada
- Sport: Ice hockey
- Duration: January 3 – March 4, 1890
- Teams: 4

1890
- Champions: Montreal Hockey Club

AHAC seasons
- ← 1888–89 1891 →

The 1890 AHAC season was the fourth season of the Amateur Hockey Association of Canada. Play was in challenges. The Montreal Hockey Club would win the final challenge of the season against the Montreal Victorias to win the Canadian championship for the third season in a row.

== League business ==
The annual meeting of the Amateur Hockey Association was held in the rooms of the MAAA in Montreal, on November 22, 1889. The main business was whether to accept Quebec or not, and whether to change the Crystals team name to the Dominions. Representatives from most of the hockey clubs were present. The election for the ensuing year resulted as follows:

- President, Mr. J. Stewart (Montreal);
- first vice-president, H. Kinghorn (McGill);
- second vice-president, W.G Cameron (Victorias);
- secretary-treasurer, J.A Findlay (Montreal);
- Council — A.E. McNaughton (Montreal), W.E. Stevenson (Victoria), J. McDonald (Crystals), D.B. Holden (McGill), R. Davidson (Quebec).

== Regular season ==
The season consisted of challenge games as well as numerous exhibition matches between all the teams in the AHAC. Quebec would challenge this season. The Montreal Crystals would be known as the Dominion Hockey Club of Montreal for this season.

=== Overall record ===
Statistics are based on challenge games only and do not include stats regarding exhibition games

Note GP = Games Played, W = Wins, L = Losses, T = Ties, GF = Goals For, GA = Goals Against

Team	GP	W	L	T	GF	GA
Montreal Hockey Club†	7	7	0	0	28	13
Quebec Hockey Club	1	0	1	0	1	5
Montreal Dominions	3	0	3	0	3	15
Montreal Victorias	3	0	3	0	4	8

† National Champion

=== Results ===
Date	Visitor	Score	Home	Score	Location
Exhibition play
Jan. 3	Montreal HC	5	Victorias	4	Dominion Rink
Jan. 13	McGill	4	Victorias	11	Victoria Rink
Jan. 24	Victorias	1	Montreal HC	5	Dominion Rink
Jan. 28	Ottawa HC	1	Victorias	3	Victoria Rink
AHAC Challenge play
Jan. 7	Quebec HC	1	Montreal HC	5	Dominion Rink
Jan. 17	Victorias	2	Montreal HC	4	Dominion Rink
Jan. 31	Dominions	4	Montreal HC	6	Dominion Rink
Feb. 11	Dominions	2	Montreal HC	6	Dominion Rink
Feb. 18	Victorias	1	Montreal HC	2	Dominion Rink
Feb. 25	Dominions	2	Montreal HC	3	Crystal Rink
Mar. 4	Victorias	1	Montreal HC	2	Crystal Rink

== Player Stats ==
=== Scoring leaders ===
Note: GP = Games played, G = Goals scored.

Name	Club	GP	G
Archie McNaughton	Montreal HC	7	12
Jack Findlay	Montreal HC	7	6
Dave Brown	Dominions	3	4
Alex Kingan	Montreal HC	2	3
Allan Cameron	Montreal HC	6	2
Sam Lee	Montreal HC	4	2
Andy Ritchie	Dominions	3	2
Jack Arnton	Victorias	2	1
Eddie Barlow	Victorias	3	1
Arthur Scott	Quebec HC	1	1
George Lowe	Montreal HC	1	1

No scorer identified for 1 Montreal and Victoria goal.

=== Goaltender averages ===
Note: GP = Games played, GA = goals against, SO = Shutouts, GAA = Goals against average

Name	Club	GP	GA	SO	GAA
Tom Paton	Montreal HC	7	13	0	1.9
Robert Jones	Victorias	3	8	0	2.7
Joe Fyfe	Dominions	1	3	0	2.0
Archie Laurie	Quebec HC	1	5	0	5.0
Robert Scanlan	Dominions	2	12	0	6.0

Preceded by Montreal HC; 1888–89	Montreal Hockey Club; AHAC Champions; 1890	Succeeded by Montreal HC; 1891
Preceded by 1888–89 AHAC season	AHAC seasons 1890	Succeeded by 1891 AHAC season
