= 1888 AHAC season =

- League: Amateur Hockey Association of Canada
- Sport: Ice hockey
- Duration: January 13 – March 12, 1888
- Teams: 4

1888
- Champions: Montreal Hockey Club

AHAC seasons
- ← 1887 1888–89 →

The 1888 AHAC season was the second season of the Amateur Hockey Association of Canada. Play was in a series format. The Montreal Hockey Club would win a playoff game against the Montreal Victorias 2-1 to win the Canadian championship for the first time.

== League business ==
The league at its annual meeting of November 9, 1887, decided to change the method of play for the season to a 'series' between the teams of the AHAC. Each team would play every other team twice. Ottawa did not attend and did not participate in the season.

Executive

- President: J. J. Arnton, Victorias
- 1st Vice president: J. A. Stewart, Montreal
- 2nd Vice president: H. A. Budden, McGill
- Secretary-treasurer: W. E. Stevenson, Victorias
- Council: A. L. Shanks, McGill; D. A. Elliott, Crystals; A. Shearer, Victorias; L. Barlow, Montreal

Source: Kitchen 2000, p. 11

== Regular season ==
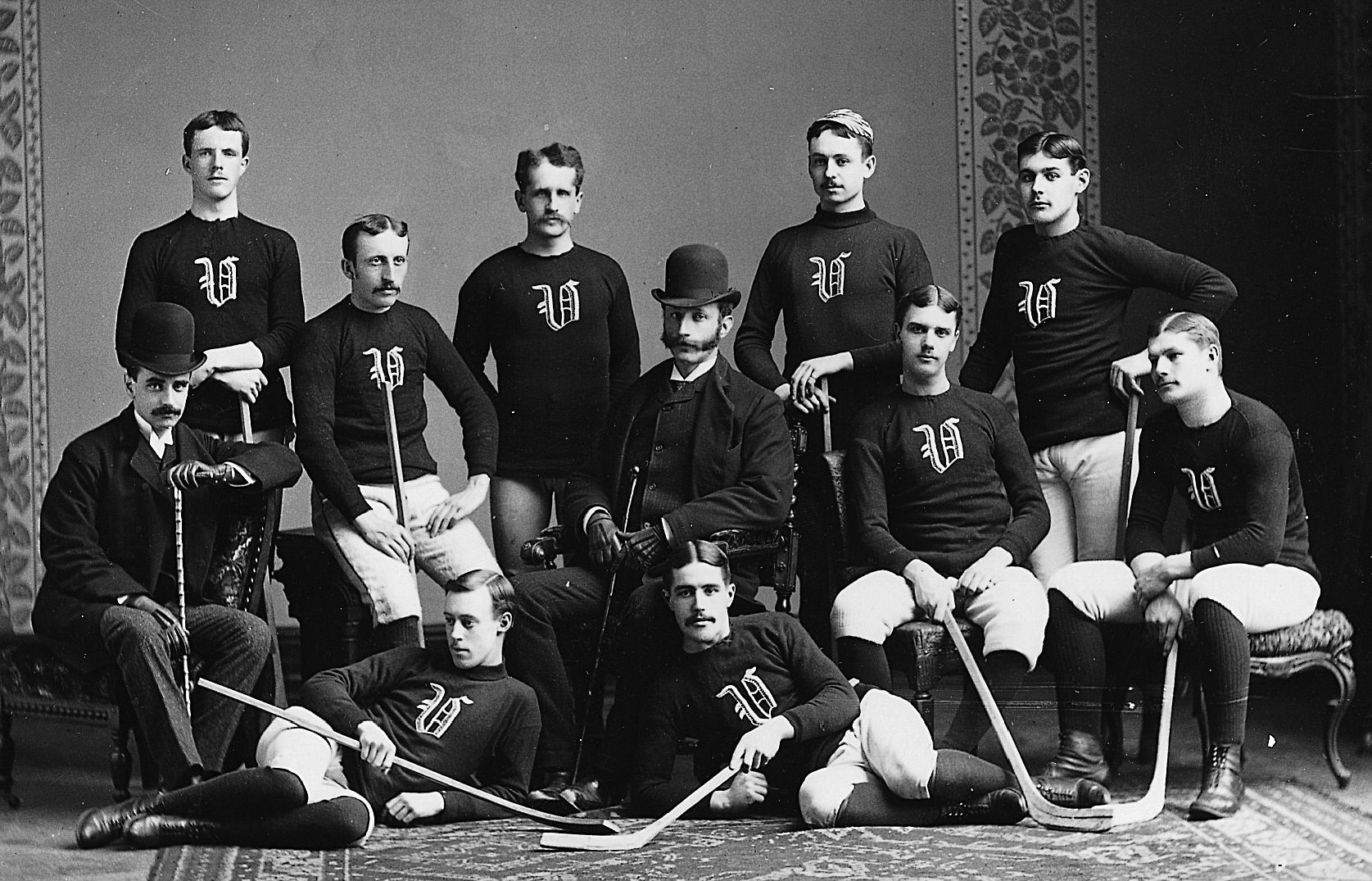
Montreal Victorias in 1888

Ottawa would not return this season to challenge.

=== Overall record ===
Note GP = Games Played, W = Wins, L = Losses, T = Ties, GF = Goals For, GA = Goals Against

| Team | GP | W | L | T | GF | GA |
|---|---|---|---|---|---|---|
| Montreal Hockey Club† | 6 | 5 | 1 | 0 | 23 | 6 |
| Montreal Victorias | 6 | 5 | 1 | 0 | 24 | 9 |
| Montreal Crystals | 6 | 2 | 4 | 0 | 18 | 14 |
| McGill University | 6 | 0 | 6 | 0 | 4 | 40 |

† National Champion

=== Results ===
| Date | Visitor | Score | Home | Score | Location |
|---|---|---|---|---|---|
AHAC Challenge play
| Jan. 13 | Montreal HC | 4 | Crystals | 1 | Crystal Rink |
| Jan. 18 | Victorias | 8 | McGill | 1 | Victoria Rink |
| Jan. 23 | Montreal HC | 5 | McGill | 0 | Crystal Rink |
| Jan. 27 | Victorias | 3 | Crystals | 1 | Crystal Rink |
| Feb. 3 | Victorias | 3 | Montreal HC | 1 | Victoria Rink |
| Feb. 10 | Crystals | 4 | McGill | 1 | Crystal Rink |
| Feb. 15 | Montreal HC | 3 | Crystals | 1 | Crystal Rink |
| Feb. 22 | Victorias | 6 | McGill | 2 | Crystal Rink |
| Feb. 27 | Montreal HC | 2 | Victorias | 1 | Crystal Rink |
| Mar. 2 | Montreal HC | 8 | McGill | 0 | Crystal Rink |
| Mar. 7 | Victorias | 3 | Crystals | 2 | Victoria Rink |
| Mar. 12 | Crystals | 9 | McGill | 0 | Crystal Rink |
AHAC Playoff Game
| Mar. 15 | Victorias | 1 | Montreal HC | 2 | Crystal Rink |

Source: "Before the Trail of the Stanley Cup"

== Player Stats ==
=== Scoring leaders ===
Note - GP = Games played, G = Goals scored

| Name | Club | GP | G |
|---|---|---|---|
| D.A. Elliot | Crystals | 6 | 8 |
| Jack Campbell | Victorias | 7 | 8 |
| James Virtue | Montreal HC | 7 | 8 |
| Fred Ashe | Victorias | 5 | 5 |
| James Kinghorn | Victorias | 7 | 5 |
| Sam Lee | Crystals | 4 | 4 |
| Archie Hodgson | Montreal HC | 5 | 4 |
| Andy Shearer | Victorias | 7 | 4 |

=== Goaltender averages ===
Note: GP = Games played, GA = Goals against, SO = Shutouts, GAA = Goals against average

| Name | Club | GP | GA | SO | GAA |
|---|---|---|---|---|---|
| Robert Scanlan | Crystals | 1 | 1 | 0 | 1.0 |
| Tom Paton | Montreal HC | 7 | 7 | 2 | 1.00 |
| J.C. Crathern | Victorias | 5 | 6 | 0 | 1.2 |
| Tom Arnton | Victorias | 2 | 4 | 1 | 2.0 |
| A.G. Higginson | Montreal HC | 1 | 2 | 0 | 2.0 |
| William Virtue | Crystals | 4 | 9 | 0 | 2.2 |
| Jack Norris | Crystals | 1 | 4 | 0 | 4.0 |
| Shanks, Albert | McGill | 5 | 29 | 0 | 5.8 |
| McCaffrey, Ed | McGill | 1 | 6 | 0 | 6.0 |

== Playoffs ==
| Date | Winning Team | Score | Losing Team | Location |
|---|---|---|---|---|
| March 15, 1888 | Montreal HC | 2–1 | Montreal Victorias | Crystal Rink |

The playing of the game was tarnished with some scandal. The AHAC council convened to set the date of the playoff. Two players for the Victorias, Ashe and J. J. Arnton Jr. were injured, and the council set the date for the playoff before the players were recovered. The deciding vote for the date was cast by J. Stewart, who played for the Montreal HC team. Hodgson of Montreal scored the first goal at 4½ minutes, followed two minutes by a goal of Campbell for the Vics. 5½ minutes later Hodgson lifted a shot past Arnton in the Vic's goal to put Montreal ahead to stay. The Vics protested that the goal was off-side to no avail. There was no more scoring in the match. The Montreal Daily Herald reporter praised referee Hamilton of the McGill Club, noting that both side broke the off-side rule often.

== Montreal HC 1888 AHAC champions ==
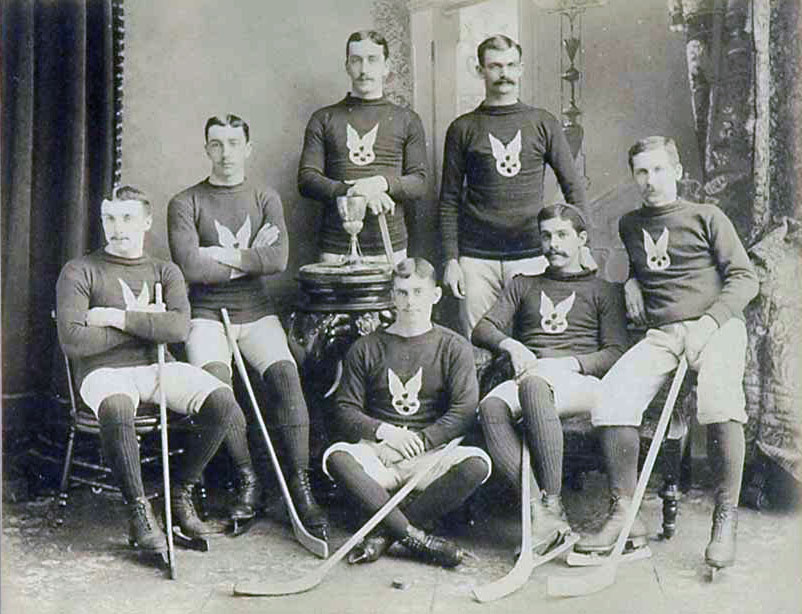
Montreal HC in 1888.

Players
Forwards
Jack Findlay
Archie Hodgson, (also played cover point)
Billy Hodgson
George S. Low
James Virtue
Defence
Allan Cameron
Archie McNaughton
James A. Stewart
Goaltender
Thomas L. Paton

Source: Kitchen 2000, p. 11

| Preceded by Montreal Crystals; 1887 | Montreal Hockey Club; AHAC Champions; 1888 | Succeeded by Montreal HC; 1888–89 |
| Preceded by 1887 AHAC season | AHAC seasons 1888 | Succeeded by 1888–89 AHAC season |
