= 1892 AHAC season =

- League: Amateur Hockey Association of Canada
- Sport: Ice hockey
- Duration: January 8 – March 7, 1892
- Teams: 5

1892
- Champions: Montreal Hockey Club

AHAC seasons
- ← 1891 1893 →

The 1892 Amateur Hockey Association of Canada season lasted until March 7. The championship changed hands twice during the season. Ottawa defeated the Montreal Hockey Club in January and held the championship until March, defending it six times before Montreal won it in the final challenge of the season, defeating Ottawa 1–0.

== Season ==
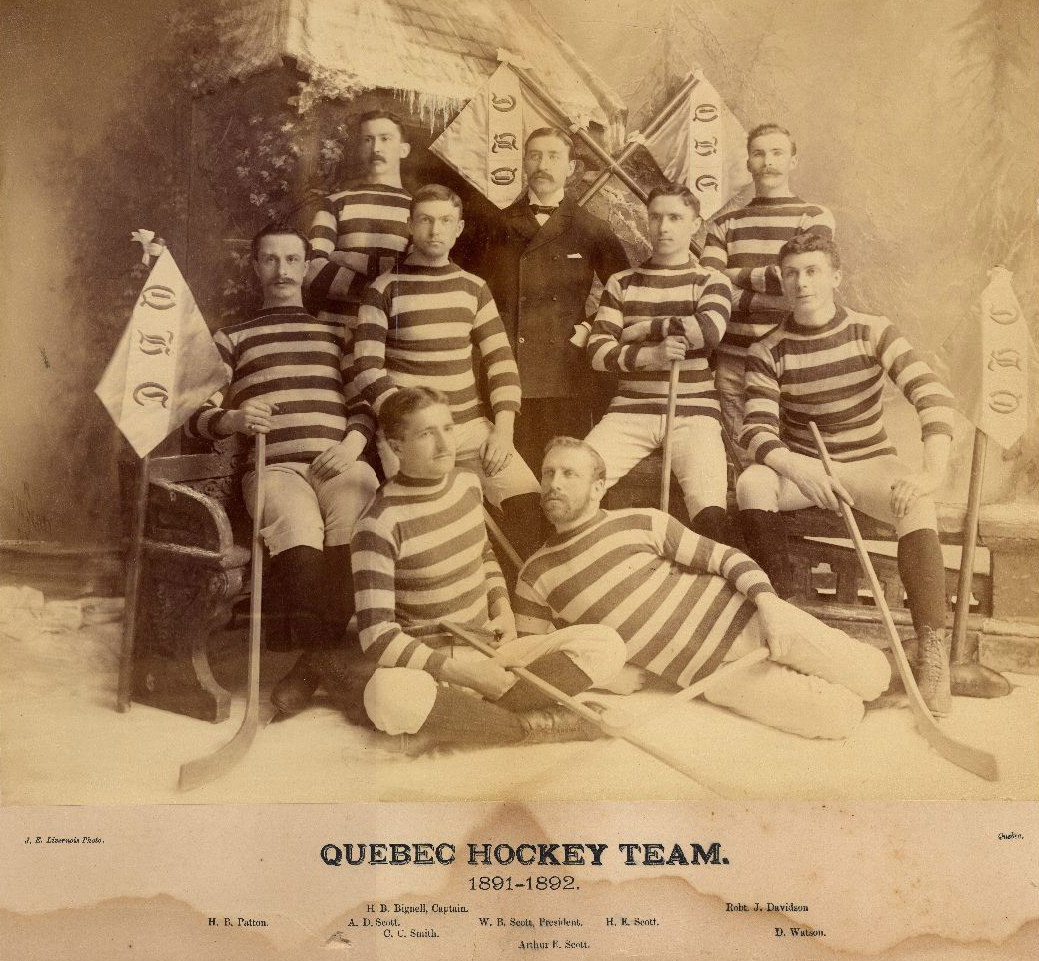
Quebec Hockey Club in 1891–92.

The Britannia Hockey Club of Montreal mounted their first challenge. Ontario champion Ottawa Hockey Club took over the championship by defeating the Montreal Hockey Club, and held it until the final game of the season, when the Montreal HC defeated them at their home Rideau Rink. It was the Montreal HC's only win of the season. The result is said to have displeased Governor-General Stanley, and after the season, he announced his donation of the Stanley Cup at the Ottawa HC end-of-season banquet, and asked for changes in the determination of the championship.

=== Overall record ===
Note GP = Games Played, W = Wins, L = Losses, T = Ties, GF = Goals For, GA = Goals Against

Team	GP	W	L	T	GF	GA
Ottawa Hockey Club	7	6	1	0	23	9
Montreal Hockey Club†	6	1	4	1	9	21
Montreal Shamrocks	1	0	1	0	3	8
Montreal Britannias	1	0	0	1	2	2
Quebec Hockey Club	2	0	2	0	3	6

† League Champion by winning final challenge

=== Results ===
Games consisted of a mixture of Challenge games and Exhibition (friendlies)

Date	Visitor	Score	Home	Score	Location
Exhibition play
Jan. 26	Sherbrooke HC	1	Quebec HC	13	Quebec Skating Rink
Jan. 29	Montreal HC	1	Shamrocks	2	Crystal Rink
Jan. 30	Victorias 2nds	5	Sherbrooke	6	Sherbrooke Rink
Feb. 2	Victorias	8	Montreal HC	4	Victoria Rink
Feb. 3	Britannias	2	Montreal HC	2	Victoria Rink
Feb. 5	Shamrocks	1	Montreal HC	4	Crystal Rink
AHAC Challenge play
Jan. 8	Ottawa HC	4	Montreal HC	3	Crystal Rink
Jan. 15	Shamrocks	3	Ottawa HC	8	Rideau Rink
Jan. 21	Montreal HC	2	Ottawa HC	10	Rideau Rink
Jan. 28	Quebec HC	3	Ottawa HC	4	Rideau Rink
Feb. 11	Montreal HC	1	Ottawa HC	3	Rideau Rink
Feb. 18	Quebec HC	0	Ottawa HC	2	Rideau Rink
Mar. 7	Montreal HC	1	Ottawa HC	0	Rideau Rink

== Player Stats ==
=== Scoring leaders ===
Note: GP = Games played, G = Goals scored

Name	Club	GP	G
Robert Bradley	Ottawa HC	6	9
Halder Kirby	Ottawa HC	5	4
Jack Kerr	Ottawa HC	6	4
Chauncey Kirby	Ottawa HC	5	3
Bert Russel	Ottawa HC	6	3
Sam Lee	Montreal HC	4	2
George Lowe	Montreal HC	6	2

Source: Ultimate Hockey

=== Goaltending averages ===
Note: GP = Games played, GA = Goals against, SO = Shutouts, GAA = Goals against average

Name	Club	GP	GA	SO	GAA
Albert Morel	Ottawa HC	6	9	1	1.5
W. Cameron	Britannias	1	2	0	2.0
Tom Paton	Montreal HC	5	11	0	2.2
Bob Patton	Quebec HC	2	6	0	3.0
Joe Fyfe	Shamrocks	1	8	0	8.0
Harry Shaw	Montreal HC	1	10	0	10.0

Source: Ultimate Hockey

Preceded by Montreal HC; 1891	Montreal Hockey Club; AHAC Champions; 1892	Succeeded by Montreal HC; 1893
Preceded by 1891 AHAC season	AHAC seasons 1892	Succeeded by 1893 AHAC season
