= Montreal Crystals =

Canadian ice hockey team from 1884 to 1895

- Founded: 1884
- History: Montreal Crystals; 1884–1886 (independent); 1887–1889 (AHAC); Montreal Dominions; 1890 (AHAC); Montreal Crescents; 1891 (AHAC); 1892 (dormant); Montreal Crystals; 1893–1895* (AHAC): *Merged into dormant Montreal Shamrocks midway through season (February). Shamrocks were revived after the merger and finished the season in their place.
- Home arena: Samuel Robertson's 2nd Crystal Rink (NE corner Dorchester/Metcalfe, Montreal), Dominion Rink (Montreal), Crescent Rink (Montreal), Samuel Robertson's 3rd Crystal Rink (SE corner Dorchester/Guy, Montreal)
- City: Montreal, Quebec
- Team colours: White and Light Blue
- Stanley Cups: 0

The Montreal Crystals (Crystal Hockey Club) were an ice hockey team based in Montreal, Quebec, Canada that existed from 1884 to 1895. One of the first established ice hockey teams, the Crystals played various challenges against other clubs in the early days of ice hockey competition.

In 1886 the Crystals won the Montreal portion of a season-long competition arranged to determine a Dominion hockey champion. They met the rough and tumble Quebec Hockey Club at the Crystal Rink on March 19 in a match described contemporaneously as being "for the Dominion championship." On March 20, 1886, The Montreal Daily Herald and Daily Commercial Gazette noted that the Bulldogs were the heavier team, but the "Crystals in skating were far ahead of them." The game ended controversially after a Quebec player was injured; Quebec requested that the Crystals withdraw a player to equalize the sides, the Crystals refused, and Quebec left the ice. Quebec had five spares but said none were good enough. The referee awarded the game and the Dominion championship to the Crystals. The title remained subject to challenge, however, and five days later the Montreal Victorias defeated the Crystals 4–1 in a championship challenge, leaving the Victorias as the title holders at the close of the 1886 season.

The following winter the club became a founding member of the Amateur Hockey Association of Canada. In the inaugural 1887 AHAC season, conducted under a challenge system rather than a conventional standings format, the Crystals won the final challenge of the season, defeating the Montreal Victorias 3–2 at the Victoria Rink on March 11 to claim both the AHAC and Canadian championships.

The club continued to challenge for the championship in subsequent seasons through 1891.

Contemporary accounts identify the original Crystal Hockey Club with Samuel Robertson's commercial Crystal Rink at Dominion Square, at the corner of Dorchester and Metcalfe streets, rather than with the relocated Crystal Palace at Fletcher's Field. When the club was formed on January 2, 1884, the Montreal Daily Star reported that it would practise three times weekly at the Crystal Rink. The following month, advertisements for the rink identified Samuel Robertson as its manager. By November 1884, Robertson was also serving as honorary president of the Crystal Hockey Club. A retrospective on Montreal skating rinks published in 1886 described the Crystal Rink as being on Dominion Square at Dorchester and Metcalfe, stated that it was "owned solely" by Robertson, and described the Crystal Hockey Club as "an organization connected with the Rink." The same article said that the rink had then been in existence for five years. They won the Canadian championship in 1886, defeating Quebec, which withdrew due to numerous injuries in the final game. Later that year the Crystals helped to found the Amateur Hockey Association of Canada where they played the first five seasons.

For the 1890 season, the club became known as the Montreal Dominions (Dominion Hockey Club).

In 1891 they became known as the Montreal Crescents (Crescent Hockey Club).

The team sat out the 1892 season.

In 1893, they returned to the league and returned to their original name of Montreal Crystals, playing their home games at Samuel Robertson's third Crystal Rink at the corner of Dorchester and Guy.

On March 10, 1893, they played a regular season game against the Montreal Hockey Club (M.A.A.A.). The Crystals were aware that MAAA had a chance to clinch first place and the AHAC title (as well as the first ever Stanley Cup). MHC won 2-1 in overtime at the Crystal Rink (Dorchester/Guy in Montreal).

In February 1895, the Crystals were purchased by the Shamrocks Amateur Athletic Association, and were merged into the dormant Montreal Shamrocks Hockey Club, who were then revived replacing the Crystals in the AHAC.

The club took their various names from the rinks they played in. The Samuel Robertson's 2nd Crystal Rink (NE corner Dorchester/Metcalfe, Montreal) from 1884 to 1889. The Dominion Rink in 1890, and the Crescent Skating Rink in 1891. In 1893, they reverted to their original name of Montreal Crystals, because they moved into Samuel Robertson's 3rd Crystal Rink (SE corner of Dorchester and Guy).

== Junior teams ==
Outside of the senior club, the Montreal Crystals had two lower-tier teams as well. A junior team called the Montreal Jr Crystals (Junior Crystals Hockey Club) debuted in 1887 in the JAHAC (Junior Amateur Hockey Association of Canada) and played until 1895 (with the exceptions of the 1890 and 1892 seasons). In 1894, an intermediate version of the Montreal Crystals played in the IAHAC (Intermediate Amateur Hockey Association of Canada). This team only played that one season.

1893 RosterThe 1893 Montreal Crystals were:

G - Herbert Collins

P - James McDonnell

CP - Boone

William G. Murray

Dave Brown

Samuel McQuisten

Alex Ritchie

== Season-by-season record ==
Year	Club name	League/competition	GP	W	L	T	PTS	GF	GA	PIM	Finish / championship
1884	Montreal Crystals	Independent / Montreal Winter Carnival	--	--	--	--	--	--	--	--	Participated in Montreal Winter Carnival
1885	Montreal Crystals	Independent / Montreal Winter Carnival	--	--	--	--	--	--	--	--	Participated in Montreal Winter Carnival
1886	Montreal Crystals	Dominion Championship	--	--	--	--	--	--	--	--	Canadian / Dominion champions
1887	Montreal Crystals	AHAC	5	2	3	0	--	7	12	--	AHAC and Canadian champions
1888	Montreal Crystals	AHAC	6	2	4	0	--	18	14	--	--
1888–89	Montreal Crystals	AHAC	6	3	3	0	--	17	16	--	--
1890	Montreal Dominions	AHAC	3	0	3	0	--	3	15	--	--
1891	Montreal Crescents	AHAC	2	0	2	0	--	3	10	--	--
1892	Montreal Crescents	--	--	--	--	--	--	--	--	--	Dormant
1893	Montreal Crystals	AHAC	8	3	5	0	6	25	34	--	3rd
1894	Montreal Crystals	AHAC	8	0	8	0	0	10	43	--	5th
1895	Montreal Crystals	AHAC	7	3	4	0	6	21	39	--	4th
