= Director of audiography =

Sound director, Head of a sound department

The director of audiography (DA), within Indian-style filmmaking, known elsewhere as a sound director, is the head of the sound department and the person responsible for planning the audiography and managing the audiographers of a film.

== Overview ==
The title is not used professionally in most parts of the world. The role and title "director of audiography" derives from Indian-style filmmaking, where it is an established title credit. The DA works to carry out the director's vision, identifies the tasks necessary to realize this vision, budgets for those tasks, and coordinates all the work from pre-production to post-production whilst keeping an eye on overall sound quality.

Since the onset of the "talkies", a creative and professional conflict has emerged from the ongoing tension between the visual and aural dimensions of the film. Production sound crews often complain about the lack of consideration given to sound in film productions. Having a DA in pre-production helps to exert a powerful presence to defend the dimension of sound in film.

In the early days of the Hollywood studio system, every studio had a sound director (SD) or a recording director (RD), who headed the sound department and took sole credit for the work done by a large crew of sound technicians. Hollywood sound editor David Yewdall bemoans the loss of the SD in Hollywood and recalls the story of film producer Ross Hunter, working on the film Airport, who neglected to take the advice of sound editor Joe Sikorski to record aircraft sound effects on location; an SD would have immediately appreciated the financial implications of not taking such advice.

Following the demise of the studio system and the loss of the sound director, part of this role was delegated to the post-production supervisor, supervising sound editor, sound designer or production sound mixer - each role allegedly having less influence, responsibility, and scope than the former SD. Where no DA is hired - as is the case when making films in the West - there has been some debate on the most appropriate role to head the sound department; a supervising sound editor is seen as a technical manager - comparable to an art director - whereas a sound designer is viewed as a creative visionary, analogous to a production designer. In practice, the industry sees both roles as equivalent.

The DA should not be confused with a production supervisor or post-production supervisor - both are administrative roles in the production department. In contrast, the DA is a technical role blending leadership, management and administrative skills with creative audiography ranging over pre-production, production and post-production - constrained only by the Director's vision and the production's schedule and budget. In many ways, the DoA role is a natural extension of the more limited post-production role of supervising sound editor.

The term director of sound (DoS) has also been proposed as an alternative title to that of DA.

Director of Audiography - Lines indicate chains of command. Arrows indicate paths of communication and coordination.

== See also ==
- Category:Audio directors
