= Crystal Palace (Montreal) =

Exhibition hall and ice rink in Montreal, Quebec

Coordinates: 45.5025°N 73.5698°W

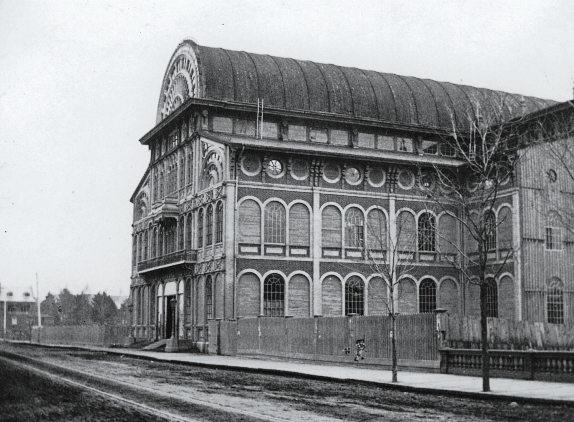
Side view in 1866, at original location on Victoria Street.

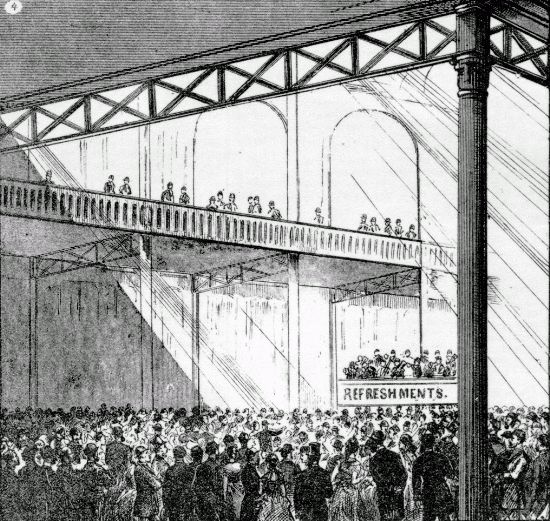
Interior of the Crystal Palace in 1879.

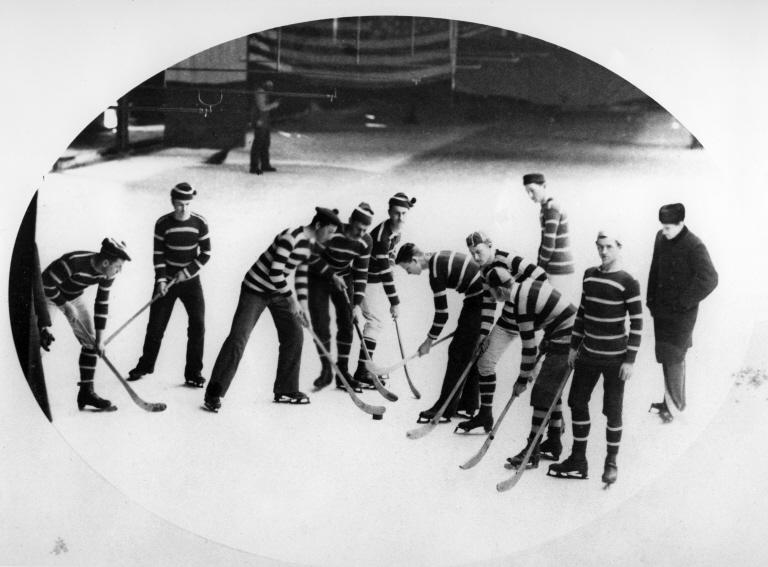
Hockey match, Crystal Palace skating rink, 1881

The Crystal Palace was an exhibition hall built for the Montreal Industrial Exhibition of 1860, originally located at the foot of Victoria Street (one block west of University) between Sainte-Catherine and Cathcart Streets, then relocated to Fletcher's Field. The building was near Rue Jeanne-Mance and Boulevard St. Joseph West. It was used for temporary exhibitions, and in winter, housed an ice skating rink.

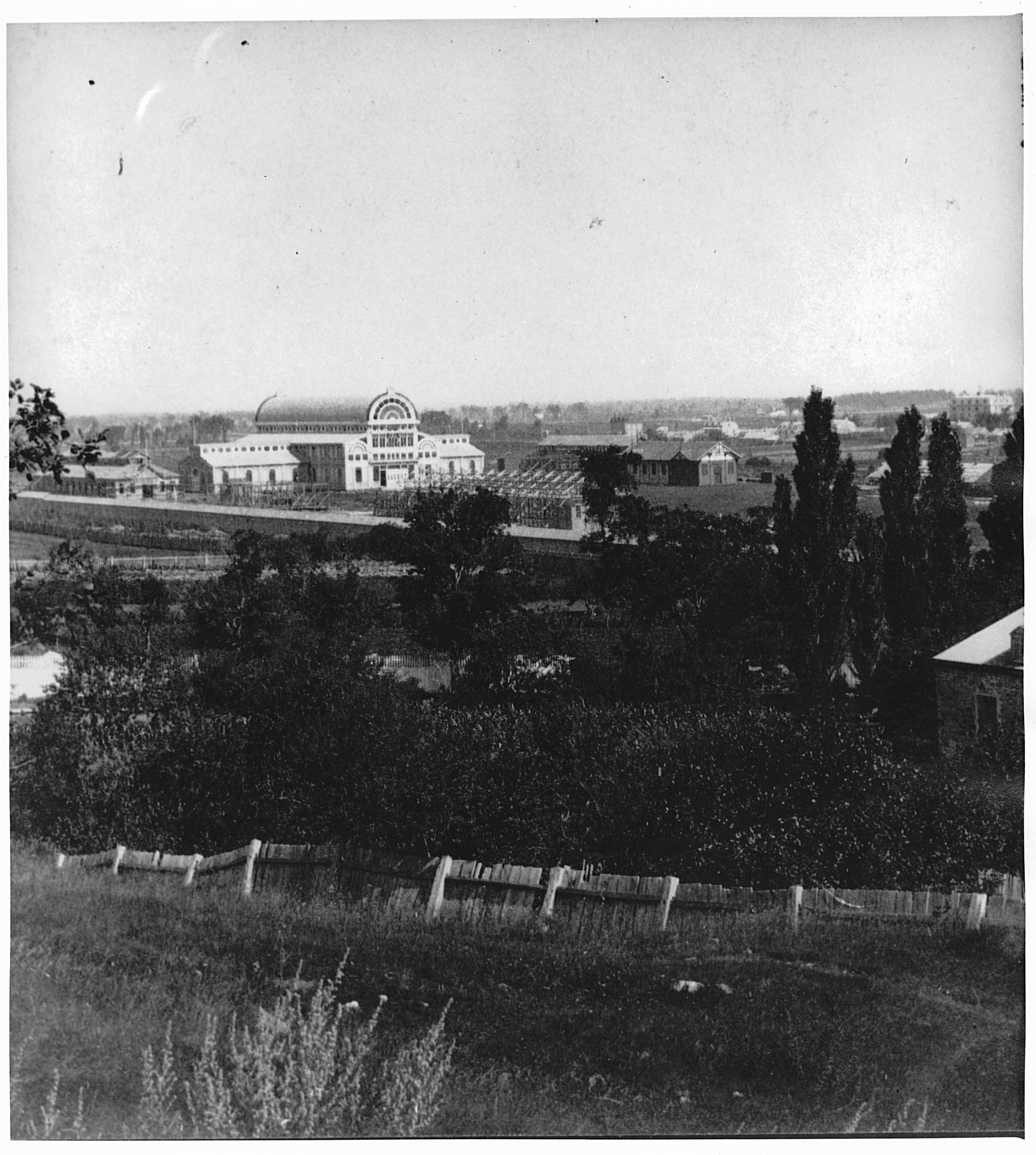
The second Crystal Palace, Fletcher's Field, 1880.

== Construction ==
The building was designed by Montreal architect John William Hopkins. It had an iron framework, a tinned barrel-vaulted nave and two galleries, each 20 feet wide, extending all the way around the interior. Its design was inspired by The Crystal Palace in London. Its main facades were of iron and glass. Its side walls were of white brick with rose-coloured contrast, with the iron and wood elements painted to match the brick. Its bays were subdivided by three arches, with only the centre arch glazed. Constructed in 20-foot modules, the Crystal Palace was intended to be 180 x 200 feet, but was constructed with shorter transepts, reducing its dimensions to 180 x 120 feet.

== 1860 Industrial Exhibition ==
The Industrial Exhibition displayed agricultural and industrial products from the then British North America. The displays ranged from minerals, native woods, seeds and grains, preserved birds and fish, oils and foodstuffs to textiles and leather goods, furniture, clothing, machinery, iron work, tools and crafts. As part of the exhibition the Art Association of Montreal, the future Montreal Museum of Fine Arts, organized a display of Canadian art. The Prince of Wales visited Montreal that year and officially opened the exhibition.

== Skating rink ==
The exhibition hall was suitable for other uses. In later years, the hall housed a natural ice skating rink in the winter, one of the first indoor skating rinks in Canada. The skating rink was used by McGill University students to play ice hockey and the rink is the site of the first known photograph of ice hockey players in hockey uniforms, taken in 1881.

From 1884 to 1889, the rink also housed the Crystal Skating Club and Crystal Hockey Club, more commonly known as the Montreal Crystals, which played men's senior-level amateur hockey in the Amateur Hockey Association of Canada.

A second, unaffiliated Crystal Rink was built in 1890 on the southeast corner of what is now Boulevard René-Lévesque Ouest (then Dorchester) and Rue Guy. The clinching game for the first Stanley Cup was played at that rink, as the Montreal Hockey Club defeated the Montreal Crystals.

== Relocation and fire ==
In 1878 it was dismantled and moved to Fletcher's Field, part of which is now known as Jeanne-Mance Park. In July 1896, the Crystal Palace was destroyed by fire, as London's original Crystal Palace would be 40 years later in 1936. The site of the Crystal Palace, between Mont-Royal Avenue and Saint-Joseph Boulevard, was developed for housing a few years after the fire.

The original downtown location later was home to the Palace Theatre, a movie house, and today contains an alley named Ruelle Palace.
