= Haviland Routh =

Canadian ice hockey player

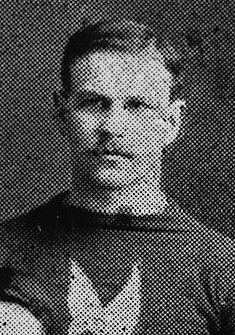
- Routh with the Montreal Hockey Club in 1894.
- Born: June 20, 1871 Montreal, Quebec, Canada
- Died: January 1959 (aged 87) Montreal, Quebec, Canada
- Position: Rover
- Played for: Montreal Hockey Club
- Playing career: 1890–1897

Haviland Routh (June 20, 1871 – January 1959) was a Canadian ice hockey player for the Montreal Hockey Club. He played at the rover position. Routh won two Stanley Cups in 1893 and 1894 with Montreal HC.

== Death ==
Routh died in Montreal in January 1959 at the age of 87 and was survived by his daughter, Marguerite.
