= 1897 AHAC season =

Ice hockey season

- League: Amateur Hockey Association of Canada
- Sport: Ice hockey
- Duration: January 9 – March 6, 1897
- Teams: 5

1897
- Champions: Montreal Victorias

AHAC seasons
- ← 1896 1898 →

The 1897 Amateur Hockey Association of Canada season was the eleventh season of play of the ice hockey league. Each team played 8 games, and Montreal Victorias were again first with a 7–1 record, retaining the Stanley Cup. The club won the Stanley Cup back from the Winnipeg Victorias prior to the season. This was their third-straight league championship.

== League business ==
=== Executive ===
- J.A. Findlay, Montreal (President)
- J. H. Dunbar, Quebec (1st. Vice-Pres.)
- Weldy Young, Ottawa (2nd. Vice-Pres.)

At the annual meeting on December 12, 1896, the secretary reported that the association had lost all of its records in a fire, except for its minutes.

=== Rule Changes ===
- No more than a 15-minute delay during a game
- No raising the stick above the shoulder except for 'lifting.'
- Executives were given the power to suspend club or player for foul play.
- Protests of games had to be made within two days.

== Season ==
Clare McKerrow of Montreal HC set a new record with six goals in the opening game against Quebec on January 9.

The Ottawa club moved to new Dey's Arena.

=== Final standing ===
Note GP = Games Played, W = Wins, L = Losses, T = Ties, GF = Goals For, GA = Goals Against

Team	GP	W	L	T	GF	GA
Montreal Victorias	8	7	1	0	48	26
Ottawa Hockey Club	8	5	3	0	25	18
Montreal Hockey Club	8	5	3	0	31	26
Quebec Hockey Club	8	2	6	0	22	46
Montreal Shamrocks	8	1	7	0	27	37

=== Results ===
Month	Day	Visitor	Score	Home	Score
Jan.	9	Quebec HC	2	Montreal HC	8
Jan.	9	Shamrocks	1	Ottawa HC	4
Jan.	12	Montreal HC	4	Victorias	5
Jan.	16	Quebec HC	1	Ottawa HC	4
Jan.	16	Shamrocks	2	Montreal HC	3
Jan.	23	Victorias	6	Shamrocks	4
Jan.	23	Montreal HC	4	Quebec HC	2
Jan.	30	Victorias	9	Quebec HC	4
Jan.	30 (†)	Ottawa HC	0	Montreal HC	1
Feb.	6	Quebec HC	1	Shamrocks	9
Feb.	6	Victorias	4	Ottawa HC	2
Feb.	10	Montreal HC	5	Shamrocks	1
Feb.	13	Ottawa HC	3	Victorias	1
Feb.	13	Shamrocks	3	Quebec HC	6
Feb.	17 (‡)	Ottawa HC	4	Montreal HC	0
Feb.	20	Quebec HC	2	Victorias	8
Feb.	20	Montreal HC	4	Ottawa HC	3
Feb.	27	Ottawa HC	1	Quebec HC	4
Feb.	27 (††)	Victorias	7	Montreal HC	3
Mar.	3	Shamrocks	4	Victorias	8
Mar.	6	Ottawa HC	4	Shamrocks	3

† Protested by Ottawa who scored the tying goal in last few seconds but the goal was disallowed by the referee. The protest was upheld and the game replayed.

‡ Replay of January 30 protested game.

₳ Victorias clinch league championship.

=== Exhibitions ===
Montreal played the Halifax Wanderers in Halifax, Nova Scotia, on February 25, 1897. The Wanderers defeated Montreal 4–3 on a second-half goal after the teams were tied 3–3 at half-time.

== Player Stats ==
=== Scoring leaders ===
Note: GP = Games played, G = Goals scored

Name	Club	GP	G
Clare McKerrow	Montreal HC	8	12
Alf Smith	Ottawa HC	8	12
Billy Barlow	Montreal HC	8	10
Ernie McLea	Victorias	8	8
Bill Dobby	Shamrocks	8	7
Albert E. Swift	Quebec HC	8	6
Harry Westwick	Ottawa HC	8	6
Cam Davidson	Victorias	6	5
Pat Doyle	Quebec HC	8	5
Herbert Horsfall	Montreal HC	8	5

=== Goaltending averages ===
Note: GP = Games played, GA = Goals against, SO = Shutouts, GAA = Goals against average

Name	Club	GP	GA	SO	GAA
Fred Chittick	Ottawa HC	8	18	1	2.3
Gordon Lewis	Victorias	8	26		3.3
Herb Collins	Montreal HC	8	26		3.3
Ernest Pagnuelo	Shamrocks	8	37		4.6
Frank Stocking	Quebec HC	6	25		5.8

== Stanley Cup challenge ==
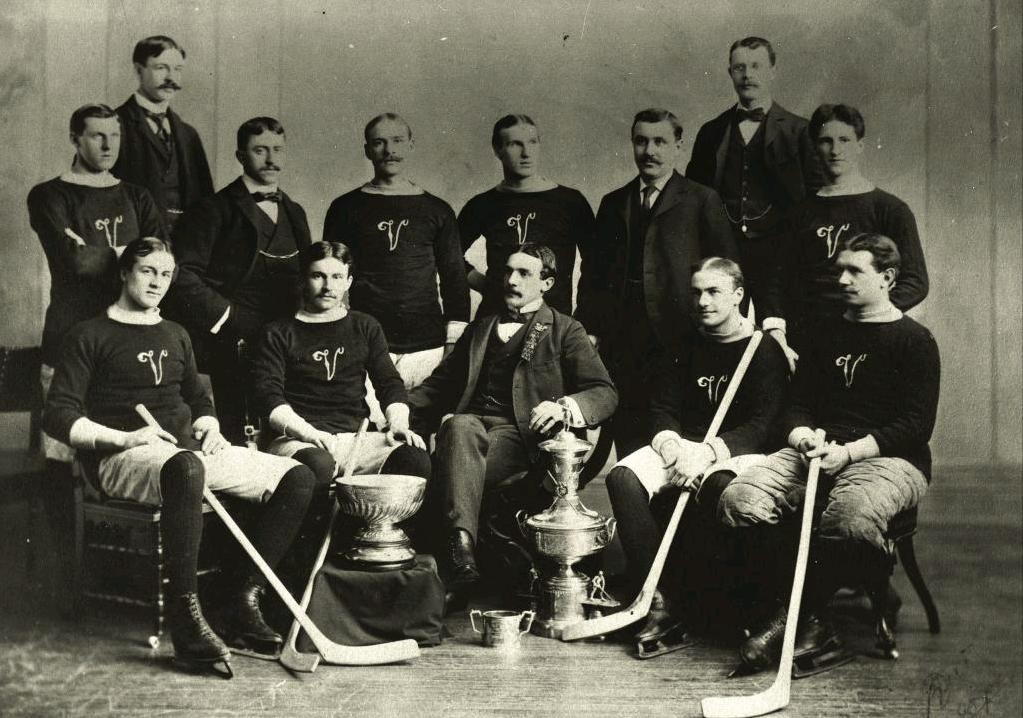
The 1897 Montreal Victorias posing for a team photograph with the Stanley Cup (trophy at left) and two other trophies.

Prior to the season, Victorias would defeat the Winnipeg Victorias of the (Manitoba Hockey Association) 6–5, on December 30, 1896, to reclaim the Cup they had lost in the previous season to Winnipeg.

=== Victorias vs. Winnipeg at Winnipeg ===
The Montreal Victorias submitted their challenge on November 11, 1896, and they arrived in Winnipeg on December 27 for the one-game playoff on December 30. The challenge, the first outside of Montreal attracted national interest. Excitement for the game in Winnipeg sent the price of $1 tickets to $5, with reports of tickets being sold for over $10. The Montreal Vics' practice in the McIntyre Rink itself drew a crowd of 700. The game was reported back to Montreal by telegraph, with the score available at train stations or telegraph offices throughout Canada. Hundreds of standing-room tickets were sold on the night of the game.

Date	Winning Team	Score	Losing Team	Location
Dec. 30, 1896	Montreal Victorias	6–5	Winnipeg Victorias	Granite Rink, Winnipeg

Game description

The game itself was very exciting. Ernie McLea scored a hat-trick, including the game and Stanley Cup winning goal. The game started at 8:22 pm local time. Dan Bain scored at 6:30 to put Winnipeg ahead. Winnipeg opened up a 3–0 lead before Montreal scored twice (McLea and Shirley Davidson) to close the gap while Toat Campbell served a penalty. Attie Howard scored just before the half to put Winnipeg ahead 4–2 at the half. In the second half, Montreal's Davidson scored his second goal, then McLea tied the score at four with his second goal of the match. Robert MacDougall, on an end-to-end rush, put Montreal ahead, but Bain tied it at five with four minutes to play. With two minutes to play, Graham Drinkwater passed to McLea, who beat George Merritt on a breakaway to put Montreal ahead 6–5 and win the game. The goal is considered one of the greatest ice hockey goals of all time.

Game summary

Dec. 30, 1896
Montreal	6		Winnipeg	5
Gordon Lewis		G	George Merritt	
Howard Henderson		P	Rod Flett	
Mike Grant		CP	Charles Johnstone	
Robert MacDougall	1	F	Colin "Toat" Campbell	
Graham Drinkwater		F	Jack Armytage	1
Shirley Davidson	2	F	Attie Howard	2
Ernie McLea	3	F	Dan Bain	2

Referee – Weldy Young, Ottawa
Umpires – A. Shearer, Montreal; D. Clark, Winnipeg, Shaw, Ottawa

Source: Montreal Gazette

== Stanley Cup engravings ==
1896 Montreal Victorias
Players
Forwards
Graham Drinkwater (rover)
Cam Davidson ^
Shirley Davidson ^
Dave Gillilan ^
Robert MacDougall ^
Ernie McLea ^
William Wallace ^
Stanley Willett ^
Defence
Howard Henderson(point)
Mike Grant (Cover point) (Captain)
Hartland MacDougall (point)
Goaltenders
Robert Jones
Gordon Lewis @

- & Unknown first name
- ^ Unknown who played Center, Right Wing and Left Wing, so the players are listed as forwards
- @ Missing from the team picture

non-players=

- Watson Jack (President)
- Fred Meredith (Hon President)
- Frank Howard Wilson (Hon Vice President)
- P.M. Desterneak (Secretary/Treasurer)&
- William Grant (Vice President)

engraving-notes=

- 1896 MONTREAL VICTORIAS

Winnipeg Feb 20th

It is unknown what Feb 20th stood for. Winnipeg Victorias or the Montreal Victorias never played a Stanley Cup challenge game that day in any season.

1897 Montreal Victorias
Players
Forwards
Graham Drinkwater(rover)
Cam Davidson ^ @
Shirley Davidson ^
Jack Ewing ^ @
Robert MacDougall ^
Ernie McLea ^ @
Harry Messy ^ @
Percy Molson ^ @
David McLellan ^ @
Defencemen
Howard Henderson(point)
Hartland MacDougall(point) @
Mike Grant(cover point – Captain)
Goaltender
Gordon Lewis

- & First names are unknown
- ^ Unknown who played Center, Right Wing and Left Wing, so the players are listed as forwards
- @ Missing from the team picture

non-players=

- Watson Jack (President)
- Fred Meredith (Hon. President)
- William Grant (Vice President)
- Fred Howard Wilson (Hon. Vice President)
- P.M. Desterneck (Secretary/Treasurer)&

== See also ==
- List of Stanley Cup champions
- List of pre-NHL seasons

Preceded by Winnipeg Victorias; 1896	Montreal Victorias; Stanley Cup Champions; 1897	Succeeded by Montreal Victorias; 1898
Preceded by 1896 AHAC season	AHAC seasons 1897	Succeeded by 1898 AHAC season
