= Shirley Davidson =

Canadian ice hockey player

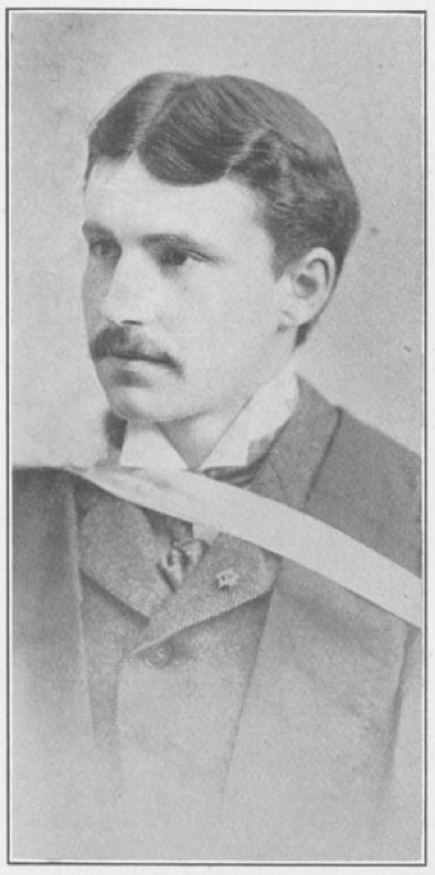
- Born: September 23, 1874 Montreal‚ Quebec, Canada
- Died: August 5, 1907 (aged 32) near Varennes, Quebec, Canada
- Height: 5 ft 6 in (168 cm)
- Weight: 150 lb (68 kg; 10 st 10 lb)
- Position: Forward
- Played for: Montreal Victorias
- Playing career: 1892–1897

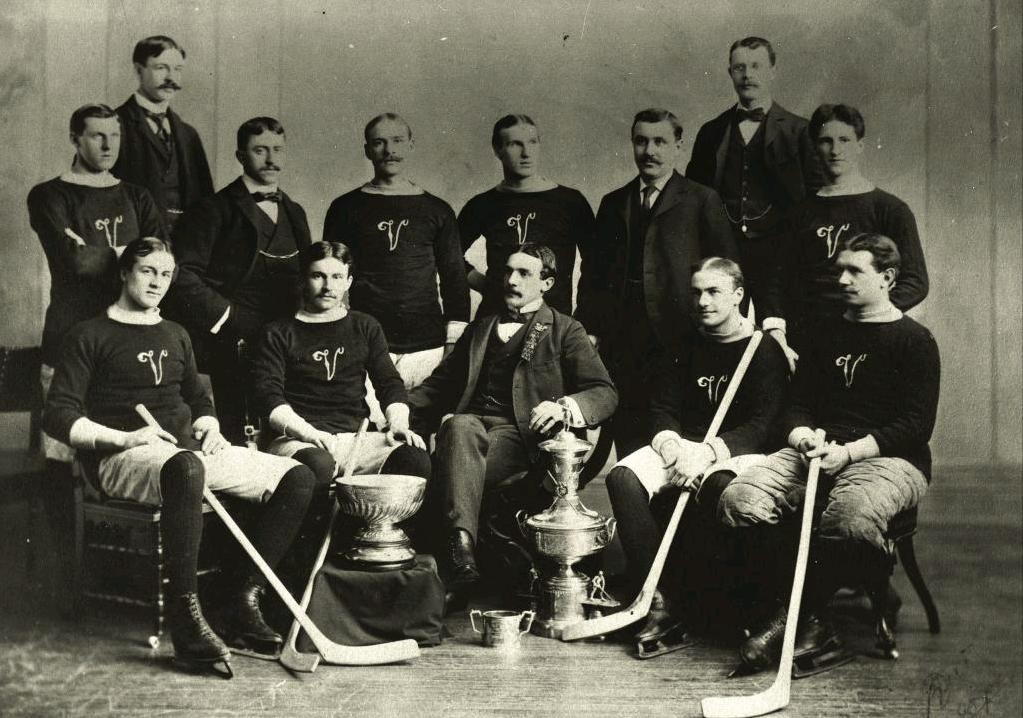
Montreal Victorias in 1897. Shirley Davidson is sitting second from left in the front row, directly behind the Stanley Cup.

Shirley Davidson (September 23, 1874 – August 5, 1907) was a Canadian ice hockey player for the Montreal Victorias during the late 19th century. He was a member of several Stanley Cup Championship teams in the 1895, 1896 and 1897 AHAC seasons.

== Playing career ==
Shirley Davidson was a noted hockey and football player, and an accomplished sailor. He was also the brother of noted player and teammate Cam Davidson. Shirley played his entire career for the Montreal Victorias. He began by playing three seasons with the junior club before moving up to the senior team in the 1892–93 AHAC season. Shirley attended McGill University in Montreal for an engineering degree, while playing for the junior Vics. Shirley was known as a fast skater, good checker and good puck handler who never would have a bad game. Records indicate that he stopped his regular season playing career after the 1895–96 AHAC season, although he participated in the Stanley Cup challenge games in the latter part of 1897. Shirley won two Stanley cups in the 1894–95 and 1896–97 seasons, but can be credited with four championships since challenge game victories occurred in December 1896 (Challenge against Winnipeg Victorias) and his team also won a lopsided victory against the Ottawa Capitals in December 1897.

== Death ==
Shirley went missing while sailing near Varennes in Quebec on August 5, 1907, along with his fiancée Aileen Hingston, daughter of Sir William Hingston (a noted Canadian surgeon and senator). The accident was said to be inexplicable because Shirley was an accomplished sailor. Their bodies were recovered and the funeral was held on August 10, 1907. Thousands attended the funeral, including several former Victoria players.

It is alleged that Shirley died in a suicide pact with Aileen Hingston as his father, Sir Charles Peers Davidson (Chief Justice of the Quebec supreme court), refused to approve their marriage because she was a Roman Catholic. Sadly, Aileen would not live to see her first book published; Pere Jean, and other stories which was made in print in 1910. Further tragedy was to befall the Davidson family shortly after this event as Shirley's brother Thornton died in the RMS Titanic disaster in 1912.

== Career statistics ==
			Regular season					Playoffs
Season	Team	League	GP	G	A	Pts	PIM	GP	G	A	Pts	PIM
1892–93	Montreal Victorias	AHAC	6	8	--	8	--	--	--	--	--	--
1893–94	Montreal Victorias	AHAC	8	6	--	6	--	1	1	--	1	--
1894–95	Montreal Victorias	AHAC	8	4	--	4	--	--	--	--	--	--
1895–96	Montreal Victorias	AHAC	7	8	--	8	--	1	0	--	0	--
1896–97	Montreal Victorias	AHAC	--	--	--	--	--	1	2	--	2	--
1897–98	Montreal Victorias	AHAC	--	--	--	--	--	1	?	--	?	--
1901–02	Sydney Discos	CBSHL	1	4	--	4	--
1902–03	Sydney Discos	CBSHL	1	0	--	0	--

Notes
- Statistics are adapted from Coleman, Charles (1964), Trail of the Stanley Cup, Vol I., Kendall/Hunt, ISBN 0-8403-2941-5
- Statistics do not include non-regular season tournaments. Stats for 1893-94 and 1897-98 are not fully available. Some season statistics are incomplete and may not represent all games and goals scored. Assists were not recorded.

== See also ==
- List of solved missing person cases: pre–1950
