= Messa =

Messa (Italian for mass (liturgy)) may refer to:

- Al Messa, a daily newspaper
- Messa (Puccini), an 1880 mass
- Messa (Greece), a town in ancient Greece
- Messa (band), an Italian doom metal band

== See also ==
- Massa (disambiguation)
- Mess (disambiguation)
- Messe (disambiguation)
- Messia (disambiguation)
- Mesa (disambiguation)
