= Robert MacDougall =

Canadian ice hockey player and businessman

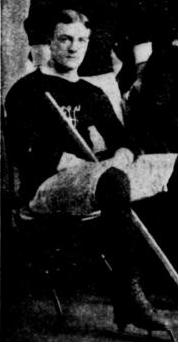
- MacDougall in the team picture of the Montreal Victorias in 1895
- Born: March 2, 1876 Montreal, Quebec, Canada
- Died: March 26, 1950 (aged 74)
- Position: Forward
- Played for: Montreal Victorias (1893-1899)

Robert Ernest MacDougall (March 2, 1876 – March 26, 1950) was a notable Canadian ice hockey player and businessman. He played in the early days of organized ice hockey, before professionalism. He played the position of forward for the Montreal Victorias and was a member of five Stanley Cup-winning teams. In 1935, he was engraved on the Stanley Cup with the 1935 Montreal Maroons championship team as an executive. earning Robert MacDougall's his 6th Stanley Cup, .

== Personal life ==
MacDougall was born in Montreal, Quebec. He attended Bishop's College School, a boarding school in Lennoxville, as a youth. At BCS he played hockey with future Victorias teammates Hartland MacDougall (no relation) and Ernie McLea. At age twelve, MacDougall played on the BCS first team of ice hockey, and is noted as one of the youngest to ever do so.

After ice hockey, MacDougall would become a partner with Hartland MacDougall in the stock-trading firm MacDougall & MacDougall of Montreal. The company continues today as MacDougall MacDougall & MacTier. He also was a executives with Montreal Maroons in the 1930s. He won his 6th Stanley Cup, getting his name on the Stanley Cup for the first time.

== Playing career ==
Macdougall was the highest-scoring forward before the 1900s in Stanley Cup play. MacDougall scored a confirmed total of 49 goals in 36 recorded games. Overshadowed today by the likes of teammates and Hall of Famers Graham Drinkwater and Mike Grant, MacDougall was consistently one of the Montreal Victorias' highest scoring forwards. Later in life, his career would take an approach to banking (working alongside Hartland MacDougall of no relation) and he would leave the sport of hockey near the end of the Montreal Victorias' championship run.

== Championship controversy ==
Near the end of MacDougall's career, he would generally only play championship games due to his work schedule. In his last season, his career would end in some controversy. In a February 1899 Stanley Cup Challenge, with Montreal leading a total goal series with four goals to two against the Winnipeg Victorias, with about 12 minutes left in the game, MacDougall slashed Winnipeg's Tony Gingras. As Gingras was carried off the ice, referee Bill Findlay only called MacDougall for a two-minute minor. Angry that he should have been assessed a larger penalty, Winnipeg went into their dressing room in protest. Insulted, Findlay abruptly went home, but returned after officials followed him on a sleigh and persuaded him to return. Once back at the rink, the referee gave Winnipeg 15 minutes to return to the ice themselves. They refused and thus Findlay disqualified the team and declared Montreal the winners. 4,000 were attending the Winnipeg Auditorium rink to hear returns of the game by telegraph.

== Career statistics ==
			Regular season					Playoffs
Season	Team	League	GP	G	A	Pts	PIM	GP	G	A	Pts	PIM
1893–94	Montreal Victorias	AHAC	1	2	--	2	--	--	--	--	--	--
1894	Montreal Victorias	Stanley Cup	--	--	--	--	--	1	1	0	1	--
1894–95	Montreal Victorias	AHAC	8	10	0	10	--	--	--	--	--	--
1895–96	Montreal Victorias	AHAC	6	**10**	0	**10**	--	--	--	--	--	--
1896	Montreal Victorias	Stanley Cup	--	--	--	--	--	2	2	--	1	--
1896–97	Montreal Victorias	AHAC	8	11	--	11	--	--	--	--	--	--
1897–98	Montreal Victorias	AHAC	8	12	0	12	--	--	--	--	--	--
1898–99	Montreal Victorias	CAHL	2	7	0	7	--	--	--	--	--	--
1899	Montreal Victorias	Stanley Cup	--	--	--	--	--	3	2	--	2	--

Notes:

- Led league in scoring in 1895–96 (bold denotes league leader)
- Statistics do not include non-regular-season tournaments. Statistics for 1893–94 and 1896–97 are not fully available. Globe and Mail editions from 1897 indicate that Robert MacDougall played out the full season and is credited for scoring a minimum of 2 goals, perhaps more. Scoring summaries for most games were not published.
