= Ras Murphy =

Canadian ice hockey player

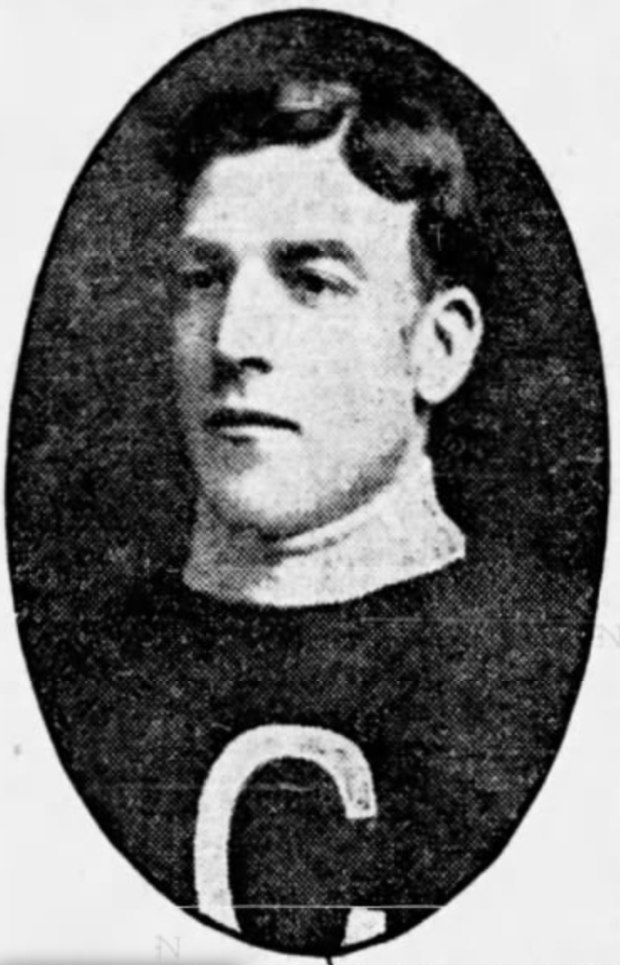
- Murphy with Capital Lacrosse Club
- Born: March 1, 1886; Ottawa, Ontario, Canada
- Died: March 10, 1975 (aged 89)
- Position: Point
- Played for: Montreal Wanderers
- Playing career: 1906–1919

Erastus Booth Murphy (March 1, 1886 – March 10, 1975) was a Canadian professional ice hockey player. He played with the Montreal Wanderers of the National Hockey Association.

He was also a lacrosse player with the Capital Lacrosse Club in Ottawa.
