= Messy =

Messy may refer to:

== People ==
- Messy Marv, stage name of American rapper Marvin Watson Jr. (born 1976)
- Harry Messy (fl. 1897), Canadian ice hockey player
- the title fictional character of Mr. Messy, a book in the Mr. Men series

== Music ==
- Messy (album), a 2023 album by Olivia Dean
- "Messy" (Lola Young song), 2024
- "Messy" (Rosé song), 2025
- "Messy", a song by Danielle Bradbery from I Don't Believe We've Met, 2017
- "Messy", a song by Fifth Harmony from Fifth Harmony, 2017
- "Messy", a song by Kiiara, 2018

== Other ==
- Messy, Seine-et-Marne, France, a commune
- Messy Church, informal Christian activity for families

== See also ==
- Messi (disambiguation)
- Messe (disambiguation)
- Massy (disambiguation)
