= Rat Westwick =

Canadian ice hockey player (1876–1957)

- Hockey Hall of Fame, 1963
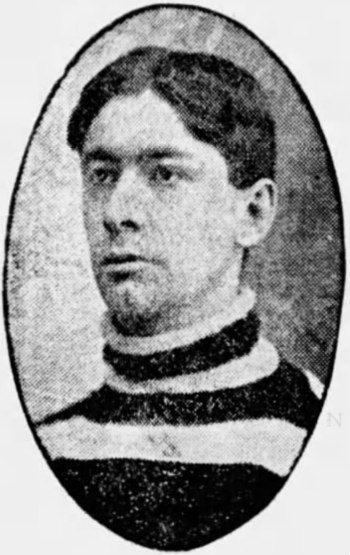
- Westwick with the Ottawa HC
- Born: April 23, 1876 Ottawa, Ontario, Canada
- Died: April 3, 1957 (aged 80) Ottawa, Ontario, Canada
- Height: 5 ft 6 in (168 cm)
- Position: Rover
- Played for: Ottawa Hockey Club; Ottawa Capitals; Kenora Thistles
- Playing career: 1894–1909

Harry "Rat" Westwick (April 23, 1876 – April 3, 1957) was a Canadian athlete in ice hockey and lacrosse. Westwick – nicknamed the Rat for his small size – is most noted for his play with the Ottawa Hockey Club, nicknamed the Silver Seven during his day, which won and defended the Stanley Cup from 1903 until 1906. He was a member of the Ottawa Capitals lacrosse team from 1896 until 1904, winning three championships. At the time of his final retirement, he was the last professional hockey player active in the 19th century. He was the brother of Thomas Westwick, the father of journalist Bill Westwick, and was inducted into both the Ottawa Sport Hall of Fame and the Hockey Hall of Fame.

== Personal life ==
Westwick, who played during a period when hockey players received little or no money, also worked as a book binder for various companies, and later, the Canadian government printing bureau. He married Rubina Duval on February 23, 1903, and worked as a civil servant in the early 1900s. When he married Rubina 'Ruby' (sister of former Ottawa teammate Peg Duval), he combined his honeymoon with a team trip to Montreal. During the game, he suffered a broken ankle and watched the rest of the game from an arena seat with his bride. He enlisted in the Army in 1914 during World War I. Ruby and Harry had six children: Bill, Thomas, Barberry, Elaine, Ula and Beatrice. His son, Bill Westwick, became the sports editor of the Ottawa Journal. His brother Tom was also a professional ice hockey player. Westwick died at home in Ottawa on April 3, 1957.

== Playing career ==
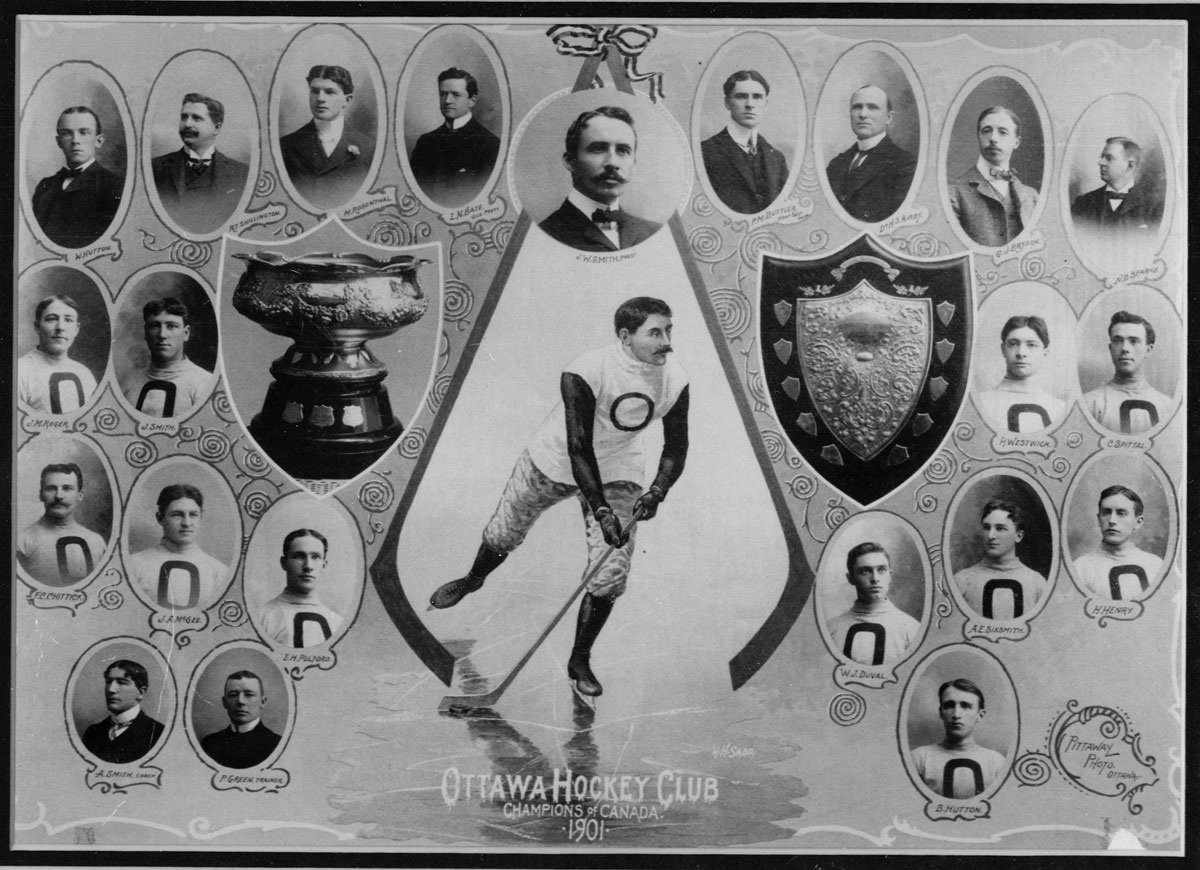
Rat Westwick, second from right in the second row from the top, with the Ottawa Hockey Club in 1901.

Born in Ottawa, Ontario, Westwick played hockey for Ottawa teams, joining the intermediate Ottawa Aberdeens of the Amateur Hockey Association of Canada (AHAC) in 1893. He moved up to the senior-level Ottawa Hockey Club the next season. At the time, Ottawa had lost its goaltender Albert Morel and Westwick played several games as goaltender before moving up to rover on the advice of a coach who saw his fast skating ability. During the summer, Westwick would play for the Ottawa Capitals in lacrosse. The Capitals, ostensibly an amateur team, were discovered to be paying players in 1896 and Westwick was suspended from ice hockey play. Westwick would deny receiving any money and he was reinstated by Ottawa in 1898, only to be suspended again in 1898 by the Canadian Amateur Athletic Union. In 1899, Westwick moved out of town to find work in Waterloo, Ontario but returned to Ottawa in time to play some games for the Capitals ice hockey team, by then playing in Ontario Hockey Association (OHA).

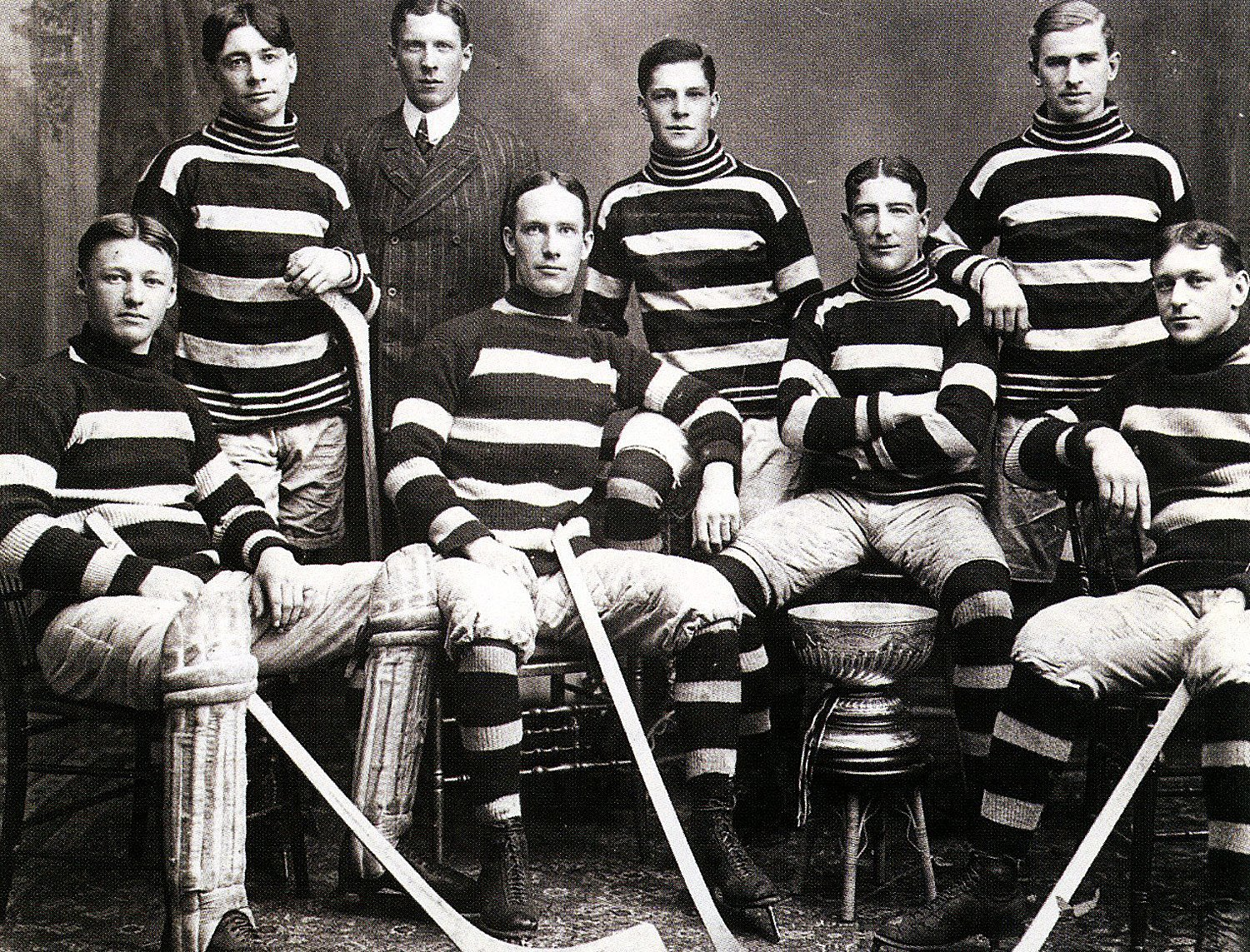
Harry Westwick, leftmost player in back row, as a member of the 1905 Ottawa Silver Sevens.

His nickname 'Rat' was from a Quebec City journalist, who in 1896 called Westwick a "miserable, insignificant rat.' Westwick's scrappiness led opponents to resort to aggressive (and somewhat violent) tactics in order to derail his tenacious playing style.

In 1900–01, Westwick returned to the Ottawa Hockey Club, and he played for the club until 1908, and was a member of the four-time Stanley Cup winning squad later dubbed the Silver Seven for receiving silver nuggets for their 1903 Stanley Cup win. Westwick's best season was in 1905, when he scored 15 goals in eight regular season games, and 5 goals in the Dawson City challenge series. In 1906–07, his brother Tom joined the Ottawa squad, starting one game. By 1909, Westwick's skating ability had been reduced by a series of ankle injuries and he did not make the 1909 Ottawa squad. He played the season for the Ottawa Senators of the Federal League, a professional team which had several former Silver Seven players. It was his last season.

=== Ringer with Kenora ===
On one occasion, after ice hockey had become professional in 1906, Westwick played for a team other than Ottawa. He joined the Stanley Cup champion Kenora Thistles in 1907 after the Ottawa's 1907 season was complete. He played the final games of the Thistles' season and played in the Thistles defence of its Stanley Cup win against the Montreal Wanderers, at the time, the arch-rival of Ottawa. While the Thistles defended their Cup win in Manitoba playing with Westwick, his appearance with the Thistles caused the challenge series with the Wanderers to be protested by the Wanderers and a cancellation was threatened by the Stanley Cup trustees. The series, held in Winnipeg, was beyond the reach of the trustees, and went ahead. The Wanderers won the series, making the protest moot. The following year, the trustees implemented the January 1 rule, where only players on a team as of January 1 of the season were eligible for Stanley Cup play.

== Retirement ==
Westwick remained involved in hockey, becoming a referee in the National Hockey Association (NHL) after retiring from active play. In 1915–16, at a time when many players were off fighting in World War I, Westwick helped out Ottawa in a comeback role, playing three games, although he did not score any goals.

Numerous ankle injuries suffered during his playing career ultimately necessitated the amputation of his left leg above the knee in 1949. Westwick was posthumously inducted into the Hockey Hall of Fame in 1963.

== Career statistics ==
=== Regular season and playoffs ===
OCJHL = Ottawa City Hockey League Junior division, OHA Int. = OHA Intermediate

			Regular season					Playoffs
Season	Team	League	GP	G	A	Pts	PIM	GP	G	A	Pts	PIM
1893–94	Ottawa Aberdeens Jr.	OCJHL	—	—	—	—	—	—	—	—	—	—
1894–95	Ottawa HC	AHAC	5	1	0	1	—	—	—	—	—	—
1895–96	Ottawa HC	AHAC	8	8	0	8	—	—	—	—	—	—
1896–97	Ottawa HC	AHAC	8	6	0	6	—	—	—	—	—	—
1897–98	Ottawa HC	AHAC	5	1	0	1	—	—	—	—	—	—
1898–99	Waterloo HC	OHA Int.	—	—	—	—	—	—	—	—	—	—
1899–1900	Ottawa Capitals	OHA	—	—	—	—	—	—	—	—	—	—
1900–01	Ottawa HC	CAHL	7	6	0	6	—	—	—	—	—	—
1901–02	Ottawa HC	CAHL	8	11	0	11	6	—	—	—	—	—
1902–03	Ottawa HC	CAHL	6	6	2	8	9	1	0	0	0	—
1902–03	Ottawa HC	Stanley Cup	—	—	—	—	—	1	0	0	0	–
1903–04	Ottawa HC	CAHL	4	5	1	6	0	—	—	—	—	—
1903–04	Ottawa HC	Stanley Cup	—	—	—	—	—	8	6	–	6	6
1904–05	Ottawa HC	FAHL	8	15	–	15	9	—	—	—	—	—
1904–05	Ottawa HC	Stanley Cup	—	—	—	—	—	5	9	–	9	3
1905–06	Ottawa HC	ECAHA	8	7	4	11	15	–	—	—	—	—
1905–06	Ottawa HC	Stanley Cup	—	—	—	—	—	6	9	–	9	9
1906–07	Ottawa HC	ECAHA	9	14	4	18	13	—	—	—	—	—
1906–07	Kenora Thistles	MHL-Pro	1	0	0	0	0	2	2	0	2	6
1906–07	Kenora Thistles	Stanley Cup	—	—	—	—	—	2	0	0	0	6
1907–08	Ottawa HC	ECAHA	10	10	1	11	20	—	—	—	—	—
1908–09	Ottawa Senators	FAHL	6	3	0	3	8	—	—	—	—	—
1915–16	Ottawa Senators	NHA	3	0	0	0	0	—	—	—	—	—
AHAC totals			26	16	–	16	—	–	–	–	–	—
CAHL totals			25	28	3	31	15	–	–	–	–	—
FAHL totals			8	15	0	15	9	—	—	—	—	—
ECAHA totals			17	21	8	29	28	2	0	0	0	—
Stanley Cup totals			—	—	—	—	—	22	24	–	24	24

=== Goaltender ===
Season	Team	League	GP	W	L	T	MIN	GA	SO	GAA
1894–95	Ottawa HC	AHAC	2	1	1	0	120	6	0	3.00
AHAC totals			2	1	1	0	120	6	0	3.00

*Playing stats from SIHR (Society for International Hockey Research)

== Awards and honours ==
- Stanley Cup winner (4 times from 1903 to 1906)
- FAHL Second All-Star Team (1905)
- ECAHA First All-Star Team (1906)
- National Lacrosse Union All-Star (1902)
- Lacrosse world titles (3 times)
- Hockey Hall of Fame member – 1962
- Ottawa Sport Hall of Fame member

Source: Hockey Hall of Fame, Who's Who in Canadian Sport.
