= William Foran =

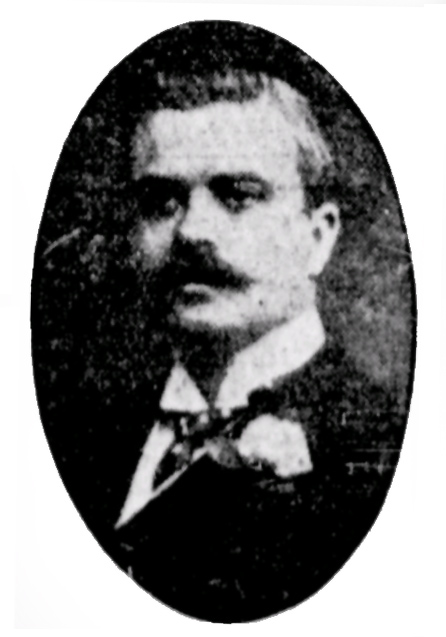
- Foran in 1910
- Born: William Michael Foran; February 4, 1871; Ottawa, Ontario, Canada
- Died: November 30, 1945 (aged 74)
- Occupations: Stanley Cup trustee, lacrosse executive

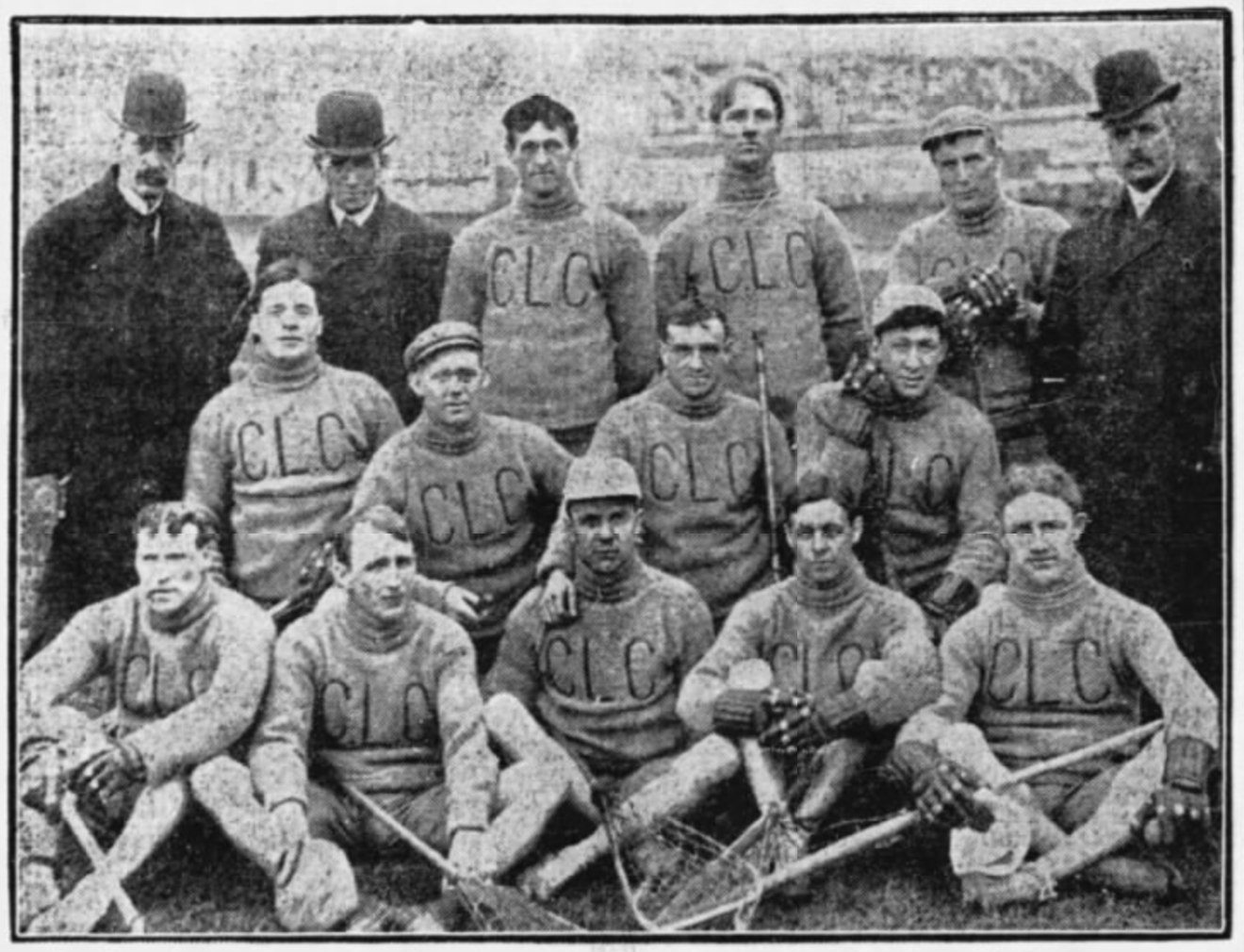
Foran, at the top right corner, with the Ottawa Capitals lacrosse team in 1907.

William Michael Foran (February 4, 1871 – November 30, 1945) was an ice hockey executive, Stanley Cup trustee and government official. For over 50 years, he was secretary of the Board of Civil Service Examiners and its follow-up organization, the Civil Service Commission of the Government of Canada.

== Government career ==
Foran served as the secretary for the Board of Civil Service Examiners for the Government of Canada from 1896 to 1908. In 1908 the Board was re-organized and Foran was the founding secretary of the Civil Service Commission (CSC), the branch of government in charge of civil service appointments through competitive examinations. That same year, he was elected to Ottawa City Council, representing St. George's Ward. He served for over 30 years in the post, and was responsible for negotiations between the CSC and parliament over civil service reform in the Civil Service Act of 1918.

In 1915 he was elected vice-president of the Civil Service Assembly of the United States and Canada, and in the following year became its president. The Assembly during those years served as a medium for the spread of ideas of civil service reform and scientific management. He was secretary of the CSC until 1939, when he retired.

== Ice hockey career ==
He was the president of the Ottawa Capitals ice hockey club and the Federal Amateur Hockey League when he was named Stanley Cup trustee on May 6, 1907. He succeeded John Sweetland who had served as trustee from the trophy's commissioning in 1893. He served as trustee for the Stanley Cup until his death on November 30, 1945. In 1929, he became president of the Ottawa Senators.

Foran was also involved with the Ottawa Capitals lacrosse team.

=== Notable trustee activities ===
In 1907, while acting trustee for P. D. Ross and John Sweetland, Mr. Foran became involved in the challenge series between the Montreal Wanderers and the Kenora Thistles. The Thistles had won the Cup from the Wanderers in a January challenge. The Wanderers would win their league and intended to challenge Kenora for the Cup. As the Eastern Canada Amateur Hockey Association (ECAHA) season was over, two players from Ottawa, Rat Westwick and Alf Smith were signed by Kenora, and used in the final playoff for the Manitoba Pro Hockey League. Mr. Foran ruled that both players were ineligible for play in the challenge against Montreal. The series went ahead anyway, with Mr. Foran threatening to take back the Cup, but rescinded his threat as Montreal won the series "under protest."

In 1914, the Toronto Blueshirts won the National Hockey Association (NHA) title. The team played the Victoria Aristocrats, champions of the Pacific Coast Hockey Association (PCHA) in a best-of-five series. Victoria had not submitted a formal challenge to the Stanley Cup trustees and Mr. Foran and P. D. Ross ruled that the series would not decide the Stanley Cup. The misunderstanding was cleared up and the series was deemed official. In the off-season, the trustees notified the NHL and the PCHA that the trustees would accept whatever arrangements the two leagues would organize. This led to an annual finals series between each league's champions to decide the Stanley Cup. From that point on, the NHL and PCHA, and later the WCHL would decide the format of the Stanley Cup playoffs.

In 1915, Mr. Foran and Mr. Ross ruled that the Cup had become synonymous with the "World's Championship" of ice hockey, and that American teams would be eligible to play for the Stanley Cup. This changed the initial conditions that Lord Stanley himself put down, stating that the Cup was for the Canadian championship.

In 1931, Mr. Foran became involved in a challenge made by the American Hockey League (AHL) to play the National Hockey League (NHL) champion. He accepted the challenge, but the NHL refused to play the challenge. President Calder of the NHL rejected the challenge, stating that the AHL was a "rogue" league. The AHL would later agree to become a minor league, affiliated with the NHL. Mr. Foran was fired from the presidency of the Ottawa Senators over this dispute.

By 1941, Foran had been named and served as trustee of the O'Brien Cup, Prince of Wales Trophy, Lady Byng Trophy as well as several other trophies.
