= 1898 AHAC season =

Ice hockey season

- League: Amateur Hockey Association of Canada
- Sport: Ice hockey
- Duration: January 4 – March 5, 1898
- Teams: 5

1898
- Champions: Montreal Victorias
- Top scorer: Cam Davidson (14 goals)

AHAC seasons
- ← 1897 1899 (CAHL) →

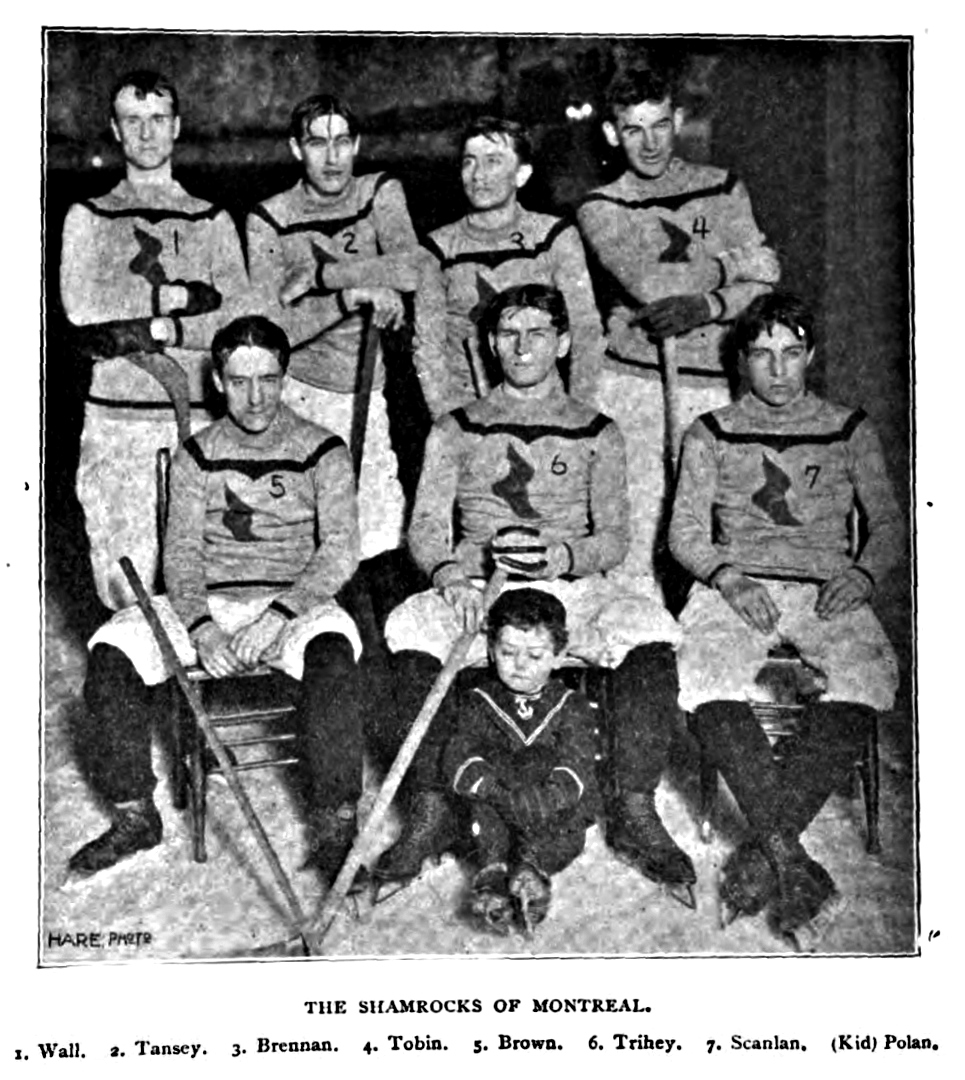
Montreal Shamrocks in 1898.

The 1898 Amateur Hockey Association of Canada season was the twelfth and final season of the league. Each team played 8 games, and Montreal Victorias were again first with an 8–0 record, to retain the Stanley Cup. This was their fourth-straight league championship. The league would dissolve prior to the next season.

== League business ==
=== Executive ===
- J. A. Findlay, Montreal (President)
- J. S. Dunbar, Quebec (1st. Vice-Pres.)
- George P. Murphy (2nd Vice-Pres.)
- F. Howard Wilson (Sec.-Treasurer)
- W. Snow, E. Hinchy, E. Farwell, E. Blurty, G. Tanguay (Council)

The Ottawa Capital Athletic Association applied to join the league, but were turned down because they had not won an intermediate-level championship.

== Season ==
=== Highlights ===
The game of February 12, 1898, between Ottawa and the Victorias was notable because Fred Chittick, the regular goalkeeper of Ottawa staged a one-man strike because he had not received his share of complimentary tickets. Ottawa played A. Cope instead and lost 9–5. The fans in attendance heckled the defence pair of Harvey Pulford and Weldy Young, and in response Mr. Young went into the crowd to attack a spectator.

=== Final standing ===
Note GP = Games Played, W = Wins, L = Losses, T = Ties, GF = Goals For, GA = Goals Against

Team	GP	W	L	T	GF	GA
Montreal Victorias	8	8	0	0	53	33
Montreal Hockey Club	8	5	3	0	34	21
Montreal Shamrocks	8	3	5	0	25	36
Quebec Hockey Club	8	2	6	0	29	35
Ottawa Hockey Club	8	2	6	0	28	44

=== Results ===
Month	Day	Visitor	Score	Home	Score
Jan.	4	Victorias	6	Shamrocks	4
Jan.	8	Montreal HC	2	Quebec HC	5
Jan.	8	Ottawa HC	1	Shamrocks	2
Jan.	11	Victorias	4	Montreal HC	3
Jan.	15	Ottawa	4	Quebec HC	3
Jan.	15	Montreal HC	10	Shamrocks	2
Jan.	19	Shamrocks	5	Victorias	7
Jan.	22	Quebec HC	1	Montreal HC	3
Jan.	29	Montreal HC	4	Ottawa HC	3
Jan.	29	Quebec HC	4	Victorias	5
Feb.	5	Shamrocks	5	Quebec HC	6
Feb.	5	Ottawa HC	6	Victorias	12
Feb.	9	Shamrocks	0	Montreal HC	4
Feb.	12	Victorias	9	Ottawa HC	5
Feb.	12	Quebec HC	1	Shamrocks	4
Feb.	19	Ottawa HC	2	Montreal HC	6
Feb.	19 (†)	Victorias	6	Quebec HC	4
Feb.	26	Quebec HC	5	Ottawa HC	6
Feb.	26	Montreal HC	2	Victorias	4
Mar.	5	Shamrocks	3	Ottawa HC	1

† Victorias clinch league championship.

== Player Stats ==
=== Scoring leaders ===
Note: GP = Games played, G = Goals scored

Name	Club	GP	G
Cam Davidson	Victorias	7	14
Clare McKerrow	Montreal HC	8	13
Robert McDougall	Victorias	8	12
Desse Brown	Montreal HC	8	11
Graham Drinkwater	Victorias	8	10
James Gillespie	Shamrocks	8	10
Howard Hutchison	Ottawa HC	8	8
R. Howard	Quebec HC	7	7
Frank White	Ottawa HC	6	7
Bert Horsfall	Quebec HC	8	6

Source: Coleman(1966), pp. 41–43

=== Goaltending averages ===
Note: GP = Games played, GA = Goals against, SO = Shutouts, GAA = Goals against average

Name	Club	GP	GA	SO	GAA
Alf Tobin	Shamrocks	2	2		1.0
Herb Collins	Montreal HC	8	21	1	2.6
Gordon Lewis	Victorias	3	9		3.0
Frank Stocking	Quebec HC	7	29		4.1
Frank Richardson	Victorias	5	24		4.8
Fred Chittick	Ottawa HC	4	21		5.3
Hugh Semple	Shamrocks	6	34		5.7
Alex Cope	Ottawa HC	4	23		5.8
Mark O'Meara	Quebec HC	1	6		6.0

== Exhibition tours ==
=== Shamrocks tour New York ===
From February 14 through 19th, the Shamrocks toured New York city, playing teams of the Amateur Hockey League. They played the New York Hockey Club twice and the Brooklyn Skating Club once. The Shamrocks split the two with New York 2–1 and 0–1 at the Lexington Avenue Ice Palace. The series was considered close however in the second game play turned rough and several Montreal players were ejected; Desse Brown (Montreal) and Billy Russell (New York). Benny Phillips of New York would score the only goal and assists were rewarded to DeCasanova and Russell. The Shamrocks also defeated Brooklyn 4–3 at the Clermont Avenue Rink.

=== Victorias tour New York ===
The first game was dubbed by the American media as establishing the amateur international championship, between the top American team, the New York Athletic Club and the top Canadian team the Montreal Victorias. After the season, the Victorias visited New York, first playing the New York Athletic Club at the St. Nicholas Rink, winning 6–1 on March 4. The game was in attendance of 3,000 people. The game was noted as the Victorias were able to 'disarm' their opponents illustrating stealing the puck from the opposing players through stick-handling. Montreal scorers were (2 goals each) Macdougall, Davidson, Drinkwater to Fenwick's single goal.

On March 5, the Victorias defeated the St. Nicholas Skating Club 8–0.

== Playoffs ==
There were no playoffs as the Victorias won first place exclusively.

== Stanley Cup challenges ==
=== Victorias vs. Ottawa ===
Prior to the season, Victorias would play Ottawa Capitals of the CCHA in a single-elimination game on December 27, 1897, winning 15–2. It was originally scheduled as the first best-of-three challenge, but the series ended after the first game because the Victorias clearly was the superior team with a 15–2 victory and the Ottawa team withdrew its challenge.

Date	Winning Team	Score	Losing Team	Location
Dec. 27, 1897	Montreal Victorias	15–2	Ottawa Capitals	Victoria Rink

Ottawa	2		Montreal	15
R. Wilmot		G	Gordon Lewis	
Lafleur		P	Hartland MacDougall	
Eddie Murphy		CP	Mike Grant, Capt	
Pat Murphy		F	Robert MacDougall	
Henry O'Connor		F	Graham Drinkwater	
Martin McGuire		F	Shirley Davidson	
William Baldwin		F	Cam Davidson	

Referee – J. A. Findlay
Umpires – M. J. Polan, A. McKerrow

Source: Ottawa Journal No challenges were played after the season.

== Stanley Cup engraving ==
1898 Montreal Victorias
Players
Forwards
Graham Drinkwater (rover)
Cam Davidson ^
Jack Ewing ^ @
Robert MacDougall ^
Ernie McLea ^
Defencemen
Howard Henderson (point)
Hartland MacDougall (point)
Mike Grant (cover point)
Goaltender
Gordon Lewis
Frank Richardson †

- † Playing-Coach
- & First names are unknown
- ^ Unknown who played Center, Right Wing and Left Wing, so the players are listed as forwards
- @Missing from the team picture.

non-players=

- P.M. Desterneck& (President), Watson Jack (Hon. President), Fred Meredith (Hon. President)
- Frank Howard Wilson (Hon. Vice President), J. Stafford Bishop& (Secretary/Treasurer)&

== See also ==
- Stanley Cup Champions
- List of pre-NHL seasons

Preceded by Montreal Victorias; 1897	Montreal Victorias; Stanley Cup Champions; 1898	Succeeded by Montreal Victorias; Feb. 1899
Preceded by 1897 AHAC season	AHAC seasons 1898	Succeeded by 1899 CAHL season
