= Charles Peers Davidson =

Canadian lawyer and judge (1841–1929)

The Honourable Sir Charles Peers Davidson
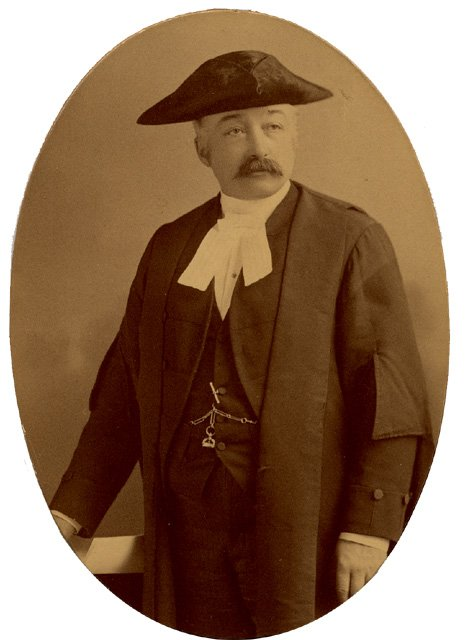

Chief Justice of the Quebec Superior Court
- In office 1912–1915

Personal details
- Born: January 1841 Huntingdon, Lower Canada
- Died: January 29, 1929 (aged 87–88) New York City, New York

Sir Charles Peers Davidson (January 1841 – January 29, 1929) was a Canadian lawyer and judge.

== Biography ==
Born in Huntingdon, Lower Canada to Captain Alexander Davidson and Marion Peers, Davidson was educated at McGill University where he received a Bachelor of Arts degree in 1863, a Master of Arts degree in 1867, a Bachelor of Civil Law degree in 1873, and a D.C.L. in 1875. He was awarded an honorary LL.D. from McGill in 1912. He was appointed to the Quebec Bar in 1864 and was made a Queen's Counsel in 1876.

In 1887 he was appointed a puisne judge of the Superior Court of the province of Quebec. From 1912 to 1915 he was Chief Justice of the Superior Court of the province of Quebec. In 1913, he was made a Knight Bachelor.

He died in New York City in 1929.

== Family ==
Charles fathered seven children by his wife, Alice Harriet Mattice (aunt to the namer of Mattice-Val Côté), including Cam and Shirley Davidson (who both won the Stanley Cup), and Thornton Davidson. Tragically both Shirley and Thornton would die by drowning, in 1907 and 1912, respectively — the latter in the RMS Titanic disaster, drowning with his father-in-law, Charles Melville Hays. Thornton's wife, Orion Hays (later Hickson) (1884–1979), survived the 1912 shipwreck, later remarried, and eventually was laid to rest next to Thornton Davidson and her parents at Mount Royal Cemetery in Montreal.
