= Mesi =

Mesi may refer to:

== People ==
- Joe Mesi (born 1973), American boxer
- Sam Mesi (1900–1971), Chicago mobster
- Senida Mesi (born 1997), Albanian politician

== Others ==
- the MESI protocol
- Mesi, Naxos, a village on the island of Naxos, Greece
- Middle East Strategic Information (MESI), a pro-Israel news/media analysis project

== See also ==
- Messi (disambiguation)
