= Cam Davidson =

Canadian ice hockey player

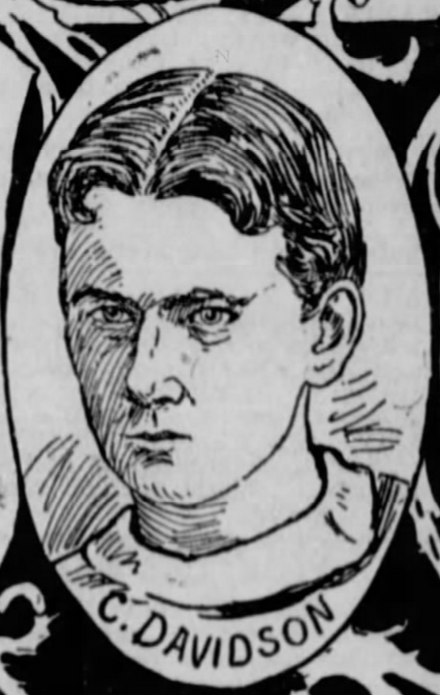
- Born: May 22, 1877 Montreal‚ Quebec, Canada
- Died: February 16, 1940 (aged 62) Qualicum Beach, British Columbia, Canada
- Weight: 150 lb (68 kg; 10 st 10 lb)
- Position: Forward
- Played for: Montreal Victorias
- Playing career: 1894–1900

Campbell Davidson (May 22, 1877 – February 16, 1940) was a Canadian ice hockey player for the Montreal Victorias during the late 19th century. He was a member of two Stanley Cup championship teams with the Victorias, in 1897 and 1899.

Cam (or Cammy) Davidson was a younger brother of Shirley Davidson who also played on the Victorias in the AHAC. Their father was lawyer and judge Charles Peers Davidson. The two brothers learned hockey with the junior Victorias and at McGill University. Cam Davidson graduated in medicine from McGill University and was known as Dr. Campbell Davidson later in his life.

Davidson died on February 16, 1940.
