= Messehalle =

Messehalle may refer to:

- Messehallen (Hamburg U-Bahn station), a subway station in Hamburg, Germany
- Messehalle, Innsbruck, a convention center in Innsbruck, Austria
- Messehalle Sindelfingen, a convention center in Sindelfingen, Germany

== See also ==
- Mess hall
- Messe (disambiguation)
- Mashallah (disambiguation)
