= Graham Drinkwater =

Canadian ice hockey player (1875–1946)

- Hockey Hall of Fame, 1950
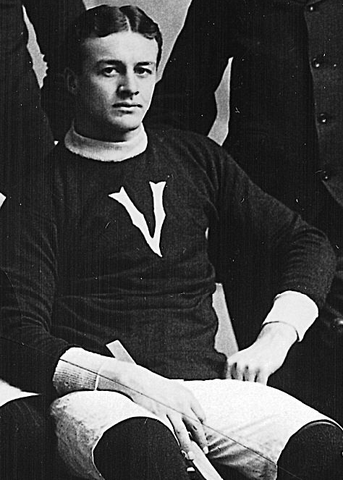
- Drinkwater in 1898
- Born: February 22, 1875 Montreal, Quebec, Canada
- Died: September 27, 1946 (aged 71) Montreal, Quebec, Canada
- Height: 5 ft 11 in (180 cm)
- Weight: 165 lb (75 kg; 11 st 11 lb)
- Position: Rover / Defence
- Shot: Right
- Played for: Montreal Victorias
- Playing career: 1892–1899

Charles Graham Drinkwater (February 22, 1875 – September 27, 1946) was a Canadian amateur ice hockey player, businessman and philanthropist. Drinkwater played for the Montreal Victorias in the Amateur Hockey Association of Canada (AHAC) in the early era before professionalism. He had the ability to play both forward and defence with equal skill. Drinkwater was a member of five Stanley Cup winning teams during his career. He was elected to the Hockey Hall of Fame in 1950. After hockey, Drinkwater became a partner in a stock-broker business and a supporter of several orchestras in Montreal.

== Early life ==
Drinkwater was born and raised in Montreal, Quebec. He was educated at the High School of Montreal and McGill University. Drinkwater was an accomplished hockey and rugby football player in his teens. He starred with the Montreal Hockey Club junior team in 1892–93, the same year, the senior team won the first Stanley Cup. Drinkwater also played a prominent role on McGill's football team.

== Hockey career ==
After graduating from McGill in 1895, Drinkwater joined the Victoria Hockey Club of Montreal. He scored nine goals in eight contests, helping the Victorias win the Stanley Cup. Drinkwater would also win the Cup in 1896, 1897, 1898 and 1899 (as Captain). His excellent skating made him one of the best players early in the game of ice hockey.

After retiring as a player, Drinkwater continued in the game as referee. He was named one of the original trustees of the Allan Cup by donator H. Montagu Allan in 1909. Drinkwater was inducted to the Hockey Hall of Fame in 1950.

== Business and music involvement ==
Drinkwater became a stock-broker and rose to partner of the firm Oswald & Drinkwater, later to become Drinkwater Weir & Company. Along with his wife Muriel Greenshields, he became a supporter of music in the city. He was the organizer of a February 11, 1934 benefit concert of the then Montreal Orchestra that cleared all of its debts and provided a surplus for future efforts. Drinkwater was vice-president of the Orchestra until it suspended in 1941. He continued supporting music as a director of Les Concerts Symphoniques (later known as the Montreal Symphony Orchestra) and a supporter of the Montreal Little Symphony until his death in 1946 at his home at 3511 Peel Street in Montreal. He was survived by his wife, a brother and a sister.

== Hockey statistics ==
			Regular season					Playoffs
Season	Team	League	GP	G	A	Pts	PIM	GP	G	A	Pts	PIM
1893	Montreal Hockey Club	AHAC-Jr	–	–	–	–	–	–	–	–	–	–
1893	Montreal Victorias	AHAC	3	1	–	1	–	–	–	–	–	–
1894	Montreal Hockey Club	AHAC-Jr	–	–	–	–	–	–	–	–	–	–
1895	Montreal Victorias	AHAC	8	9	–	9	–	–	–	–	–	–
1896	Montreal Victorias	AHAC	8	7	–	7	–	–	–	–	–	–
1896	Montreal Victorias	Stanley Cup	–	–	–	–	–	1	1	–	1	–
1897	Montreal Victorias	AHAC	4	3	–	3	–	–	–	–	–	–
1897	Montreal Victorias	Stanley Cup	–	–	–	–	–	1	0	–	0	–
1898	Montreal Victorias	AHAC	8	10	–	10	–	–	–	–	–	–
1899	Montreal Victorias	CAHL	6	0	–	0	–	–	–	–	–	–
1899	Montreal Victorias	Stanley Cup	–	–	–	–	–	2	1	–	1	–
Totals			37	30	-	30	-	4	2	-	2	-
