= Messi (disambiguation) =

Lionel Messi (born 1987) is an Argentine footballer.

Messi may also refer to:

== People ==
- Messi Bouli (born 1992), Cameroonian footballer
- Messi Yangala (born 2009), French basketball player
- Georges Messi (born 1980), Cameroonian footballer
- Joaquín Messi (born 2002), Argentine footballer
- Jorge Messi (1958–2026), Argentine businessman and former sports agent, father and former agent of Lionel Messi
- Rayane Messi (born 2007), French footballer
- Stéphane Messi (born 1972), French table tennis player
- Messi (Brazilian footballer), Jamerson Michel da Costa (born 1985), Brazilian footballer

== Others ==
- Jaunde-Texte von Karl Atangana und Paul Messi, a 1919 book by Charles Atangana and Paul Messi
- Messi (2014 film), a documentary about Lionel Messi
- Messi (2017 film), an Indian Bengali-language football drama film
- Messi (cougar), a domesticated cougar living with a Russian couple
- Messi (dog), a French Border Collie Dog actor
- Messi and Maud, also known as La Holandesa, 2017 Dutch film

== See also ==
- Mesi (disambiguation)
- Messe (disambiguation)
- Messy (disambiguation)
