= Ernie McLea =

Canadian ice hockey player (1876–1931)

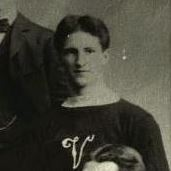
- Photograph of McLea with Victorias team in 1897.
- Born: February 5, 1876 Montreal, Quebec, Canada
- Died: June 17, 1931 (aged 55) Montreal, Quebec, Canada
- Height: 5 ft 10 in (178 cm)
- Weight: 150 lb (68 kg; 10 st 10 lb)
- Position: Forward
- Played for: Montreal Victorias
- Playing career: 1895–1900

Ernest Hope "Ernie" McLea (February 5, 1876 – June 17, 1931) was a Canadian amateur ice hockey player, in the era before professional hockey. McLea played in the 1890s for the Montreal Victorias and was a member of four Stanley Cup-winning teams. He scored the first hat trick in Stanley Cup play, and scored the Stanley Cup-winning goal in a challenge game in 1896.

== Personal life ==
McLea was born in Montreal, Quebec. He was the fifth and final child of John Brine McLea and Phoebe Elizabeth (Currie) McLea, who were both born in Newfoundland and moved to Quebec in the 1860s, then to Montreal in the 1870s. As a youth, McLea attended the Bishop's College School boarding school in Lennoxville, where he met future Victorias team-mates Hartland MacDougall and Robert MacDougall (not related). He followed this with studies at McGill University where he played rugby football and cricket.

Ernest McLea died on June 17, 1931, in his apartment on McGill College Avenue in Montreal due to a self-inflicted gunshot. McLea left a note.

== Playing career ==
McLea joined the senior Montreal Victorias for the 1896 season, playing two games during the season. In December 1896, the Victorias challenged the Winnipeg Victorias for the Stanley Cup. In a one-game playoff, McLea scored a hat trick, the first ever in Stanley Cup play, including the winning goal with two minutes to go, that won the game 6–5. The winning goal is considered one of hockey's "greatest goals" by author Eric Zweig. McLea would go on to play in five seasons with the Victorias, scoring 17 goals in 24 regular season games with the club. After his playing days, McLea did remain involved in hockey as an on-ice official.

== See also ==
- List of Bishop's College School alumni
