= Messe =

Messe is a German word meaning trade fair; a German and a French word meaning mass (liturgy) and mass (music).

== Places ==
=== Germany ===
- Messe Düsseldorf, convention centre in Düsseldorf, Germany
- Messe Erfurt, convention centre in Erfurt, Germany
- Messe Frankfurt, convention centre operator in Frankfurt am Main, Germany
- Messe München, convention centre operator in Munich, Germany
- Hamburg Messe, convention centre operator in Hamburg, Germany
- Messe Wien, convention centre in Vienna, Austria
  - Messe-Prater station, subway station
- Messezentrum Nuremberg, Nuremberg, Germany
  - Messe (Nuremberg U-Bahn), subway station
- Hannover Messe/Laatzen station, serving Hannover Messe

=== Japan ===
- Makuhari Messe, a convention centre in Chiba City, Chiba
- Toki Messe, a convention centre in Niigata, Niigata Prefecture
- Osaka Auto Messe, an annual auto show that is held at Intex Osaka

=== Other places ===
- Messé, France
- Messe (Greece), a town of ancient Greece

== Music ==
- Mass (music)
- Messe I.X–VI.X, a 2013 album by Norwegian band Ulver
- Musikmesse, a music trade fair in Germany

== People with the surname ==
- Giovanni Messe (1883–1968), Italian politician and Field Marshal

== See also ==
- Mass (disambiguation)
- Mess (disambiguation)
- Messa (disambiguation)
- Messehalle (disambiguation)
- Messi (disambiguation)
- Messy (disambiguation)
