= Mess (disambiguation) =

A mess is a place where military personnel socialise, eat and, in some cases, live.

Mess may also refer to:

== Places ==
- Mess (river), Luxembourg
- Mess Creek, British Columbia
- Mess Lake, British Columbia, Canada

== MESS ==
- MESS (festival), an annual theatre festival in Sarajevo, Bosnia and Herzegovina
- Mount Elizabeth Secondary School, Kitimat, British Columbia, Canada
- Multi Emulator Super System, an emulator for computer systems
- Melbourne Electronic Sound Studio, a non-profit organization

== Music ==
- Mess (band), an Austrian musical group
- The Mess, a French girl band (2013-2014)
- Mess (Fila Brazillia album)
- Mess (Liars album)
- Mess (The Hard Aches album)
- "The Mess" (song), 1973 song by Paul McCartney and Wings as a B-side to "My Love"
- "Mess", a song by Ben Folds Five from the 1999 album The Unauthorized Biography of Reinhold Messner
- "Mess", a song by Real Friends from the 2016 album The Home Inside My Head
- "Mess", a song by Lil Wayne from the 2018 album Tha Carter V
- "Mess", a song by Trevor Daniel from the 2018 EP Homesick
- "Mess", a song by Stray Kids from the 2025 album Karma

== Other uses ==
- Mark Messier (born 1961), nicknamed "Mess", Canadian retired National Hockey League player
- Mess Búachalla, the mother of the High King Conaire Mór in Irish mythology
- Mess kit
- Mess management specialist
- Mess of pottage

== See also ==
- Messe (disambiguation)
