= 1896 AHAC season =

Ice hockey season

- League: Amateur Hockey Association of Canada
- Sport: Ice hockey
- Duration: January 3 – March 7, 1896
- Teams: 5

1896
- Champions: Montreal Victorias

AHAC seasons
- ← 1895 1897 →

The 1896 Amateur Hockey Association of Canada season was the tenth season of play of the league. Each team played eight games, and Montreal Victorias were first with a 7–1 record. During the season, on February 14 the Victorias hosted a Stanley Cup challenge match with the Winnipeg Victorias club. Winnipeg won 2–0 to win the Cup.

== Executive ==
- Watson Jack, Victorias (President)
- Weldy Young, Ottawa (1st. Vice-Pres.)
- Clarence Mussen, Montreal (Sec.-Treasurer)

== Season ==
The Crystals were allowed to change their name to Shamrocks, which matched their new affiliation with the Shamrock A.A.A.

=== Highlights ===
The Victorias were truly the class of the league and only lost once, 3–2 to Ottawa. Their regular season team goal total was nearly double that of Ottawa.

=== Final Standing ===
Note GP = Games Played, W = Wins, L = Losses, T = Ties, GF = Goals For, GA = Goals Against

| Team | GP | W | L | T | GF | GA |
|---|---|---|---|---|---|---|
| Montreal Victorias | 8 | 7 | 1 | 0 | 41 | 24 |
| Ottawa HC | 8 | 6 | 2 | 0 | 22 | 16 |
| Quebec HC | 8 | 4 | 4 | 0 | 23 | 23 |
| Montreal HC | 8 | 2 | 6 | 0 | 24 | 33 |
| Montreal Shamrocks | 8 | 1 | 7 | 0 | 16 | 30 |

=== Results ===
| Month | Day | Visitor | Score | Home | Score |
|---|---|---|---|---|---|
| Jan. | 3 | Victorias | 7 | Montreal HC | 5 |
| Jan. | 4 | Ottawa HC | 2 | Shamrocks | 1 |
| Jan. | 10 | Montreal HC | 5 | Shamrocks | 3 |
| Jan. | 11 | Victorias | 7 | Quebec HC | 5 |
| Jan. | 18 | Montreal HC | 1 | Ottawa HC | 3 |
| Jan. | 18 | Quebec HC | 2 | Shamrocks | 1 |
| Jan. | 25 | Ottawa HC | 2 | Quebec HC | 5 |
| Jan. | 25 | Shamrocks | 1 | Victorias | 5 |
| Feb. | 1 | Ottawa HC | 3 | Victorias | 2 |
| Feb. | 1 | Montreal HC | 1 | Quebec HC | 3 |
| Feb. | 5 | Shamrocks | 5 | Montreal HC | 3 |
| Feb. | 8 | Shamrocks | 1 | Quebec HC | 4 |
| Feb. | 8 | Victorias | 3 | Ottawa | 2 (OT 6') |
| Feb. | 15 | Ottawa HC | 3 | Montreal HC | 2 |
| Feb. | 22 | Quebec HC | 2 | Montreal HC | 3 |
| Feb. | 25 | Montreal HC | 4 | Victorias | 7 |
| Feb. | 29 | Shamrocks | 2 | Ottawa HC | 3 |
| Feb. | 29 | Quebec HC | 2 | Victorias | 4 |
| Mar. | 4 (†) | Victorias | 6 | Shamrocks | 2 |
| Mar. | 7 | Quebec HC | 0 | Ottawa HC | 4 |

† Victorias clinch league championship.

== Player Stats ==
=== Scoring leaders ===
Note: GP = Games played, G = Goals scored

| Name | Club | GP | G |
|---|---|---|---|
| Robert McDougall | Victorias | 6 | 10 |
| Clare McKerrow | Montreal HC | 6 | 8 |
| Shirley Davidson | Victorias | 7 | 8 |
| Swift, E. Albert | Quebec HC | 8 | 8 |
| Harry Westwick | Ottawa HC | 8 | 8 |
| Graham Drinkwater | Victorias | 8 | 7 |
| Alf Smith | Ottawa HC | 8 | 7 |
| Pat Doyle | Quebec HC | 8 | 6 |
| David Gillilan | Victorias | 3 | 5 |
| Aubrey Mussen | Montreal HC | 5 | 5 |

=== Goaltending averages ===
Note: GP = Games played, GA = Goals against, SO = Shutouts, GAA = Goals against average

| Name | Club | GP | GA | SO | GAA |
|---|---|---|---|---|---|
| Fred Chittick | Ottawa HC | 8 | 16 | 1 | 2.0 |
| Frank Stocking | Quebec HC | 8 | 23 | | 2.9 |
| Robert Jones | Victorias | 8 | 24 | | 3.0 |
| James Drysdale | Shamrocks | 8 | 30 | | 3.8 |
| George Hamilton | Montreal HC | 2 | 8 | | 4.0 |
| Herbert Collins | Montreal HC | 6 | 25 | | 4.1 |

== Playoffs ==
There were no playoffs as Montreal won first place exclusively.

== Exhibitions ==
After the season, Montreal and Shamrocks played an exhibition series of games in the United States:

Washington, March 7, 1896

- Shamrocks 3, Montreal 1

Baltimore, March 9, 1896

- Montreal 6, Shamrocks 5

New York, March 10, 1896

- Montreal 1, Shamrocks 1 ( completed March 11 with Shamrocks winning 2–1)

The Montreal Victorias travelled to New York City for an exhibition against the New York Athletic Club. The Athletic Club records the date as March 4, (although the date conflicts with an AHAC game), won by the Vics 6–1.

== Stanley Cup challenge ==
=== Victorias vs. Winnipeg at Montreal ===
The first successful challenge to the Cup came in February 1896 by the Winnipeg Victorias, the champions of the Manitoba Hockey Association (MHA). On February 14, Winnipeg beat defending champion Montreal Victorias, 2–0, becoming the first team outside the AHAC to win the Cup. Winnipeg took a 2–0 lead in the first half of the game on goals by Armytage and Campbell, then played on the defensive in the second half.

| Date | Winning Team | Score | Losing Team | Location |
|---|---|---|---|---|
| February 14, 1896 | Winnipeg Victorias | 2–0 | Montreal Victorias | Victoria Skating Rink |

== Stanley Cup engraving ==
1896 Winnipeg Victorias
Players
Forwards
Dan Bain(center)
Colin "Tote" Campbell(left-wing)
Tom "Attie" Howard(right-wing)
* Robert "Bobby" R Benson (Spare-left-right wing),
Defencemen
Rod Flett (point)
Fred Higginbotham (cover point)
Charles Johnstone(cover-point)
Jack "J.C." Armytage(rover- Captain)
Goaltenders
George Whitey Merritt
Jack Sheppard †

† played 1 regular-season game in goal

non-players=

- E.B. Nixon (President)
- Able Code (Vice President/Manager)
- J. Carter (Mascot/Trainer)

engraving-notes=

- VICTORIAS
- - OF -
- WINNIPEG
- 1895
- Winnipeg included the year 1895 instead of 1896, because they defeated the 1895 defending Stanley Cup Champions Montreal Victorias before the 1896 season had been completed. This is not an engraving error.
- An interesting factoid for this 2-0 win over the similarly named Montreal Victorias is that the very first Stanley Cup Parade was held in Winnipeg on Main Street celebrating this victory.
- Two non-players first names are unknown

== See also ==
- 1895–96 MHA season
- List of Stanley Cup champions
- List of pre-NHL seasons

| Preceded by 1895 AHAC season | AHAC seasons 1896 | Succeeded by 1897 AHAC season |
