= Harry Messy =

Canadian ice hockey player

Harry Moreton Massey (November 11, 1875 – October 27, 1945) was a Canadian amateur ice hockey and rugby football player.

== Biography ==
Massey played ice hockey for the Montreal Victorias of the AHAC in 1897. He was dressed for several games, and played one game, as an injury replacement at forward. In those days ice hockey players played the whole game. Substitutions could only be made if a player was injured during the game. Massey did not score any goals. He was a member of the 1897 Montreal Victorias Stanley Cup winning team, but was not included on the team picture.

Massey was also a member of the Montreal Football Club.
