= Montreal Victorias =

1870s–1939 ice hockey club in Montreal, Quebec, Canada

Victoria HC
- Full name: Victoria Hockey Club
- Founded: 1874, 1877, 1881
- Folded: 1939
- Based in: Montreal, Quebec, Canada
- Colors: Maroon & White

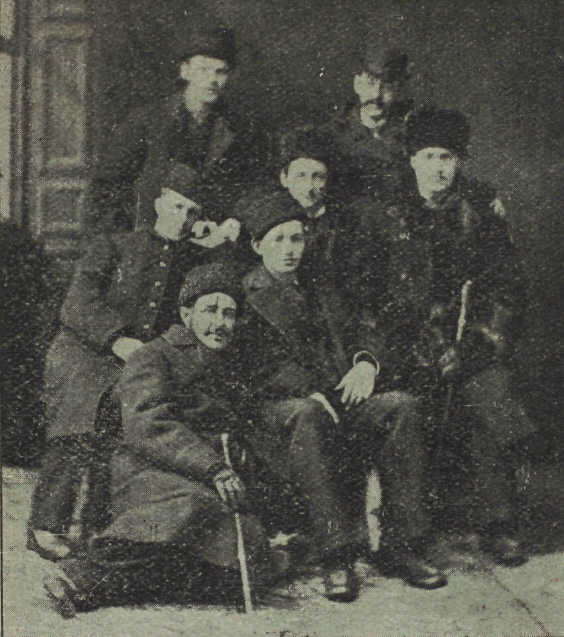
A photo of the club taken in 1881 in Quebec.

The Victoria Hockey Club of Montreal, Quebec, Canada was an early men's amateur ice hockey club. Its date of origin is ascribed to either 1874, 1877 or 1881, making it either the first or second organized ice hockey club after McGill University. The club played at its own rink, the Victoria Skating Rink in Montreal. The club was winners of the Stanley Cup in 1895 and held it until 1899, except for a period in 1896. The club remained amateur, splitting from the ranks of teams turned professional in 1908. The club was the first winner of the Allan Cup and continued to play until 1939, when it folded after its 65th season. The club often also fielded junior and intermediate teams.

== Team history ==
Interest in ice hockey at the Victoria Skating Club in Montreal, dates to at least 1874, and is attributed to the efforts of James Creighton then a judge of skating at the club, in organizing his friends to play on the rink with sticks and skates from his home province of Nova Scotia. In 1875, the first recorded organized hockey game took place at its rink, the Victoria Skating Rink, which had opened in 1862, between skating club members and McGill University students. Until 1883, there was only exhibition matches against other teams in Montreal. Tournaments would begin in 1883 at the Montreal Winter Carnival.

On January 10, 1882, the Victoria Hockey Club held what was described as its 'first annual meeting', whereby it elected its president James G. Monk. Other directors included George W. Gardner as vice-president, secretary-treasurer was Charles Lamothe. Hockey was played with both balls and pucks during this period. According to McGill hockey club member W. L. Murray, by 1881 it was normally played with a square puck, made by slicing a rubber ball. According to Murray, the Victoria club of the 1880s is credited with eliminating the square edges and playing with a round puck.

In 1886, the club helped to found the Amateur Hockey Association of Canada (AHAC). The team played in this league from 1887–1898. It was during this period that the team had its greatest success, winning the Stanley Cup in 1895, December 1896, 1897, 1898 and February 1899. They also won the AHAC league in 1895, 1896, 1897 and 1898. In 1894, the team participated in the first Stanley Cup playoff, losing 3–2 to Montreal in the semi-final.

The team resigned from the AHAC in 1898 over the proposal to allow the Ottawa Capitals into the league, and helped form the Canadian Amateur Hockey League (CAHL) in which they played from 1899–1905. The CAHL itself folded in 1905 and the team helped found the Eastern Canada Amateur Hockey Association. The league allowed amateurs and professionals to play against each other openly. The Victorias played in the league for two years as a purely amateur team leaving the ECAHA after the 1908 season to focus on amateur play.

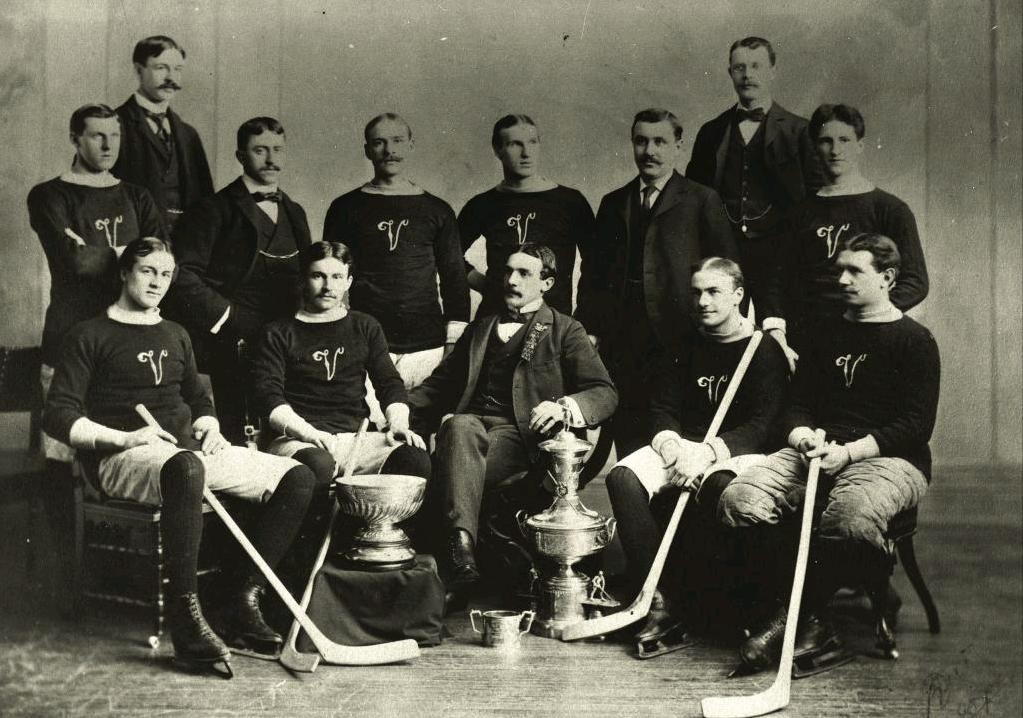
Stanley Cup champions, 1897.

In 1908, the new Allan Cup was awarded to the Victorias as the top amateur team at the time. The Victorias remained active in senior-league amateur play in the Interprovincial Amateur Hockey Union until 1913. From 1913–1923, the club was a member of the Montreal City Hockey League. The club then joined the Eastern Canada Amateur Hockey League. Later the team played in the Quebec Amateur Hockey Association.

In 1924, as a part of a 50th anniversary, the Victorias played an exhibition match against the Parkdale Canoe Club of Toronto at the then-new Montreal Forum. The game was the first amateur ice hockey game at the new venue. The game was held on December 13, 1924 and was a fund-raising event for the Club. The Victoria Skating Rink was closed in 1925 and the Victorias moved to Mount Royal Arena and the Forum.

In 1927, the Victorias became the first North American club team to tour in Europe. In Stockholm, Sweden, the club played exhibition games against an all-Sweden team, winning 17–1. Next, the Victorias defeated IK Göta 5–0, Djurgårdens IF 6–2, Södertälje SK 6–0 and IK Göta again 19–3. The team next played in Södertälje, defeating Södertälje IF 8–1. The club then played in Berlin, Germany, defeating an all-Czechoslovakia team 8–0 and Berliner SC 13–0. The team then moved to Vienna, Austria, where it defeated Wiener EV 8–0 and 7–0. In Milan, Italy, the club defeated a combined team of HC Davos and EHC St. Moritz 18–0 and defeating HC Milano 15–2. In Davos, Switzerland, the team played Davos again, winning 9–0. The final stop on the tour was London, England, where the Victorias defeated an all-England side 14–1.

The club was an Allan Cup finalist in 1928, losing to the University of Manitoba team.

The Victoria Hockey Club ceased activities in 1939.

=== Logo and uniforms ===
The team's logo was that of the Victoria Skating Club, a yellow or white 'V' in cursive. The team's sweaters were maroon in colour, and the team was sometimes nicknamed the "Maroons" by the Montreal Gazette in its reporting.

== Season by season record ==
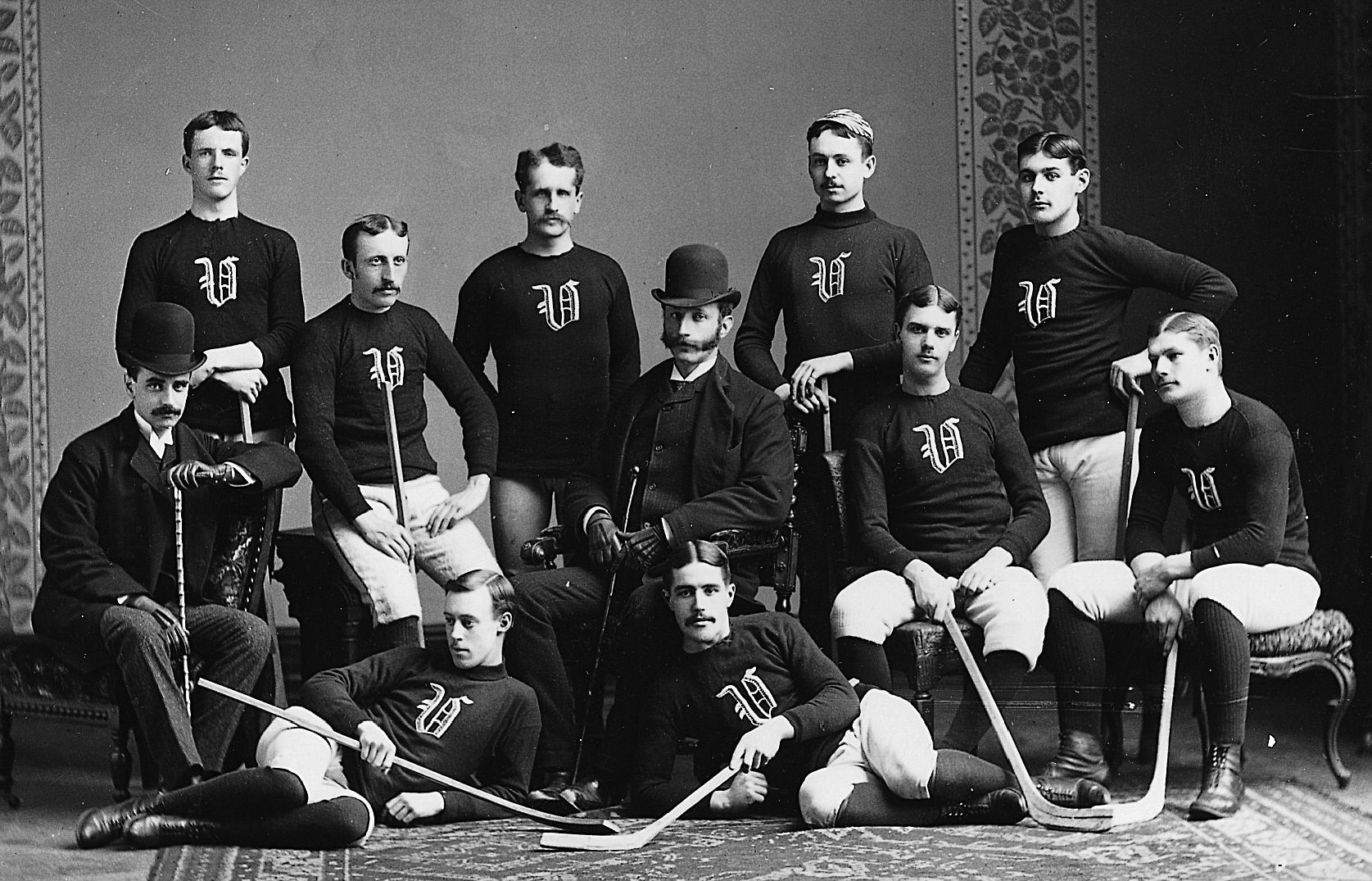
Montreal Victorias in 1888.

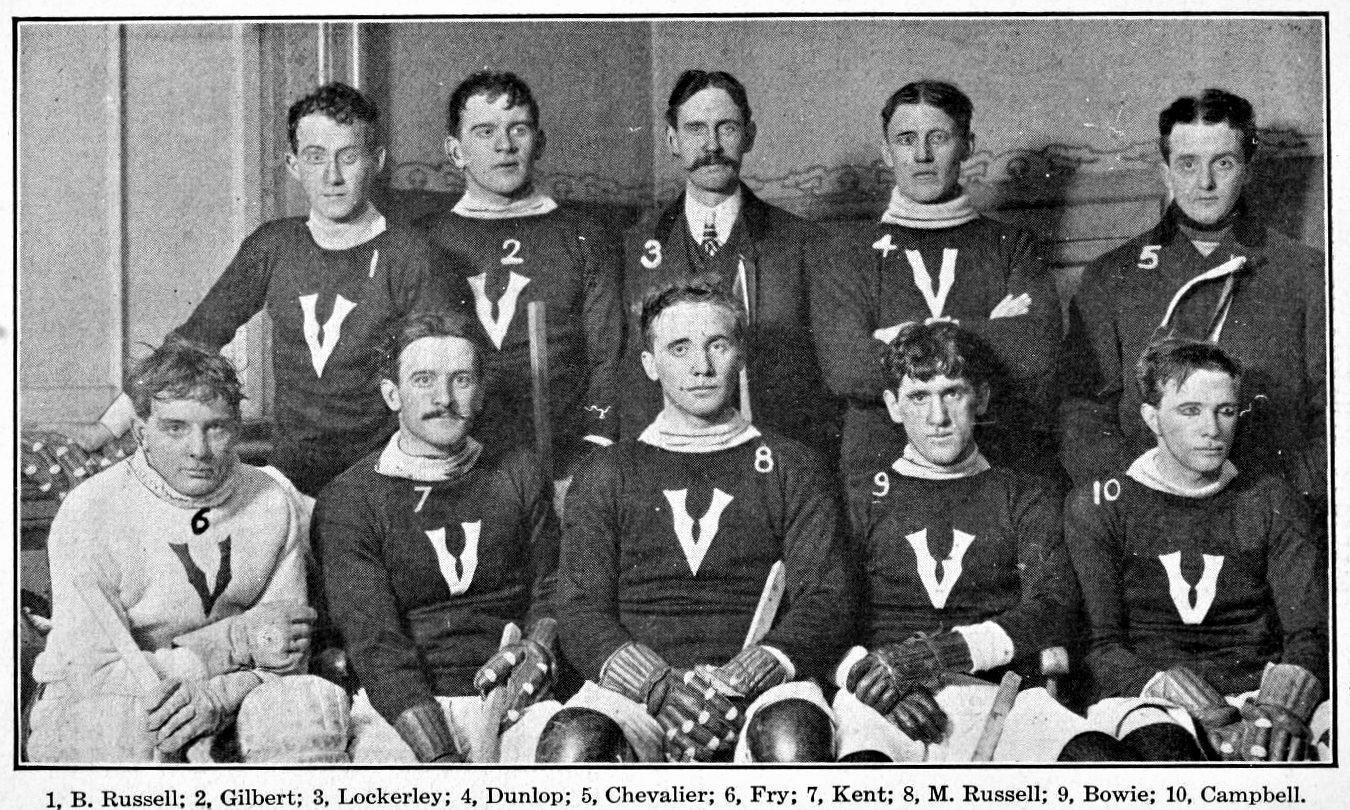
Montreal Victorias around 1905.

Except for 1887–88, season play prior to 1892–93 was arranged in challenges. The Victorias also participated in exhibitions or tournaments.

Season	League	Games	W	L	T	Pts	GF	GA	Standing	Playoffs
1883	MWC	3	0	1	2	-	2	3	-	
1884	MWC	3	2	1	0	-	1	1	-	Won tournament. One win by default.
1887	AHAC	6	5	1	0	-	21	7	-	Defeated by Crystals in final challenge of season.
1887	MWC	3	2	1	0	-	7	2	-	Lost to Montreal HC in final.
1888	AHAC	7	5	2	0	-	25	11	1st(tie)	Lost to Montreal HC in playoff.
1889	AHAC	1	0	1	0	-	1	6	-	--
1889	MWC	2	2	0	0	-	5	3	-	Won tournament.
1890	AHAC	3	0	3	0	-	4	8	-	--
1891	AHAC	2	0	2	0	-	2	6	-	--
1892	AHAC	Did not participate in AHAC challenges								
1893	AHAC	8	1	6	1	3	20	35	5th	--
1894	AHAC	8	5	3	0	10	36	20	1st(tie)	Lost 3–2 to Montreal HC in Stanley Cup playoff.
1895	AHAC	8	6	2	0	12	35	20	1st	Won Stanley Cup as AHAC champions.
1896	AHAC	8	7	1	0	14	41	24	1st	Lost Stanley Cup in challenge to Winnipeg Victorias.
1897	AHAC	8	7	1	0	14	48	26	1st	Won Stanley Cup in challenge vs. Winnipeg. Defended as AHAC champions.
1898	AHAC	8	8	0	0	16	53	33	1st	Defended Stanley Cup in challenge vs. Ottawa Capitals; Defended as AHAC champions
1899	CAHL	8	6	2	0	12	44	23	2nd	Defended Stanley Cup in challenge vs. Winnipeg Victorias Lost Stanley Cup to CAHL league champions Montreal Shamrocks.
1900	CAHL	8	2	6	0	4	44	55	4th	--
1901	CAHL	8	4	3	1	9	45	32	2nd	--
1902	CAHL	8	4	4	0	8	36	25	3rd	--
1903	CAHL	8	6	2	0	12	48	33	2nd	--
1904	CAHL	8	5	3	0	10	75	48	2nd	--
1905	CAHL	10	9	1	0	18	64	32	1st	Did not play challenge for Stanley Cup
1906	ECAHA	10	6	4	0	12	76	73	3rd	--
1907	ECAHA	10	6	4	0	12	101	70	3rd	--
1907–08	ECAHA	10	4	6	0	8	73	78	5th	--
1908–09	IPAHU	-	-	-	-	-	-	-	-	-
1909–10	IPAHU	6	4	2	0	8	-	-	1st(tie)	Lost playoff to Ottawa Cliffsides for league title
1935–36	QAHA	22	8	9	5	64	80	22	5th	--
1936–37	QAHA	22	7	12	3	58	65	18	6th	--
1937–38	QAHA	22	8	11	3	63	74	21	6th	--
1938–39	QAHA	22	5	15	3	66	79	16	6th	--

- 1883–1892: Total Hockey and other sources.
- 1893–1908: (Source: Coleman(1966)
- 1935–39: Point totals include 4 point games against McGill (Source: Ottawa Citizen)

== Notable players ==
The following players were inducted into the Hockey Hall of Fame:

- Blair Russel
- Russell Bowie
- Graham Drinkwater
- Mike Grant

=== Stanley Cup Winners for 1895 ===
Robert Jones (goal), Jim Fenwick (goal), Hartland MacDougall (goal), Harold Henderson (point), Ronald Elliot (point), William Pullan (point), Mike Grant (cover point-Captain), Graham Drinkwater (rover), Shirley Davidson (forward), Robert MacDougall (forward), Norman Rankin (forward).

Non players

Watson Jack (President), Fred Meredith (Hon. President), P.M. Desterneck (Secretary/Treasurer), G.R. Hooper (Director).

The team was awarded the Stanley Cup as 1895 champions of the A.H.A.C. regular season.

=== Montreal Victorias 1897 Stanley Cup champions ===
Gordon Lewis(goal), Harold Henderson(point), Hartland MacDougall(point), Mike Grant(cover point - Captain), Graham Drinkwater(rover), Robert MacDougall(forward), Shirley Davidson(forward), Ernie McLea, (forward), Cam Davidson(forward), Jack Ewing(forward), Harry Messy (forward), David McLellan(forward), Percival Molson(forward)

Non-players

Watson Jack(President), Fred Meredith (Hon. President), W. Grant (Vice President), Frank Howard Wilson (Hon. Vice President), P.M. Desterneck Secretary/Treasurer)

In December 1896, the club won the Stanley Cup from the Winnipeg Victorias in a Stanley Cup challenge, then won the 1897 AHAC season to retain the Cup.

== See also ==
- List of Stanley Cup champions
