= Ottawa Capitals =

Athletic association

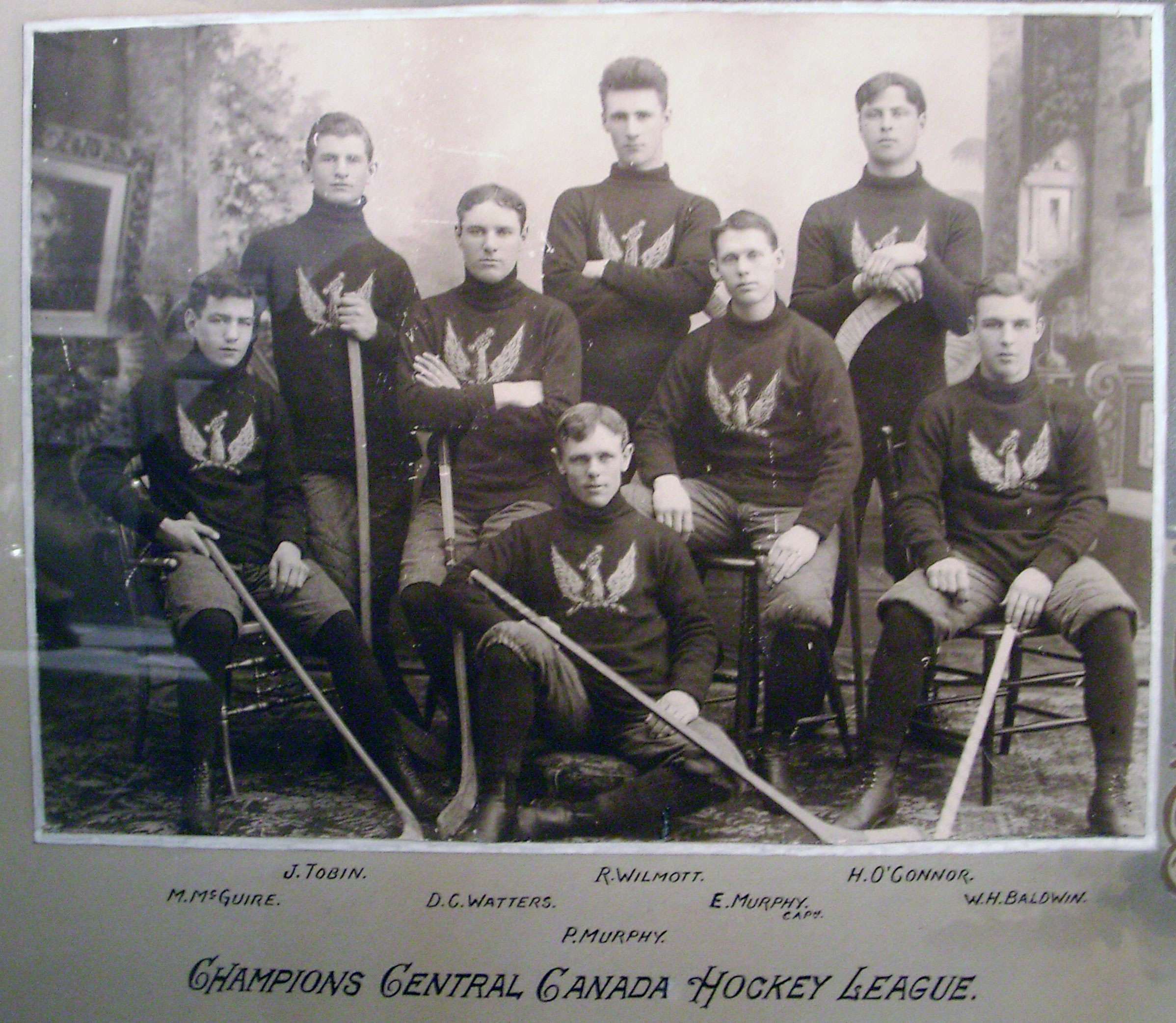
Ottawa Capitals, 1897 CCHA champions, 1897 Stanley Cup challengers

The Ottawa Capitals were the competing clubs of the Capital Amateur Athletic Association (CAAA) of Ottawa, Ontario, Canada. The Association competed in ice hockey, lacrosse and other athletics.

Perhaps best known are the early amateur senior men's ice hockey clubs which played from the 1890s until 1920. The club would challenge for the Stanley Cup in 1897, but abandon its challenge after one game, after it lost 15–2. The Capitals would later precipitate the breakup of the Amateur Hockey Association of Canada (AHAC). The nickname 'Capitals' is sometimes applied to the Ottawa Hockey Club (a.k.a. HC/Silver Seven/Generals/Senators), however the two teams were not affiliated.

The Capital Lacrosse Club was also successful, and won the first Minto Cup in 1901. The Capitals lacrosse club was one of the first amateur organizations that gave some of its players small amounts of money, causing a scandal that led to several of their athletes, including Bouse Hutton and Rat Westwick, being banned from amateur play against other organizations that frowned on any dilution of the amateur standard.

== Capital Hockey Club ==
The Capital Hockey senior club was created in 1896 by the Capital Hockey Association (CHA) hockey portion of the CAAA.

The Capitals formed the Central Canada Hockey Association (CCHA) senior league, with Brockville, Ontario and Cornwall, Ontario, in direct competition with the senior level of the Ottawa City Hockey League (OCHL) which had been organized in 1890 by the Ottawa Hockey Association (owners of the Ottawa Hockey Club). The OCHL also operated a junior and an intermediate league—the CAAA's junior Capitals played in the OCHL, winning the City championship in 1897.

After winning the CCHA championship in 1897, the senior Capitals challenged the Montreal Victorias HC for the Stanley Cup, but abandoned its challenge after only one game of a projected best-of-three, after losing 15-2. The club then joined the Amateur Hockey Association of Canada (AHAC) intermediate division and won the 1898 intermediate championship.

In 1898, the Capitals attempted to join the senior league of the AHAC, being accepted in a majority vote of the AHAC executive. Several clubs of the AHAC (including the Capitals' home town business competitor, Ottawa HC) resisted this. The Globe noted that the Capitals were "questionably amateur", referring to the paying of players. Rather than admit the Capitals, all five clubs dissolved the AHAC and formed the Canadian Amateur Hockey League (CAHL).

The Capitals applied to the CAHL in 1899 but were turned down again. Unlike the AHAC, the CAHL required unanimous consent to join the senior ranks and the Ottawas vote was enough to block the club. Instead, the club joined the Senior league of the Ontario Hockey Association (OHA).

In 1903, the club helped found the Federal Amateur Hockey League, playing one season in 1904, finishing last. President Bill Foran of the Capitals was president of the FAHL. Foran later became a Stanley Cup trustee. The club took over the ice rink lease of Dey's Skating Rink, forcing the Ottawa Hockey Club to move to the Aberdeen Pavilion. The club withdrew from the league before the 1905 season.

In 1919, by order of the Canadian Amateur Hockey Association, the Capital HA's CCHA teams, including the Capitals Hockey club, were forced to join the competing OCHL to be eligible for Allan Cup play.

== Capital Lacrosse Club ==
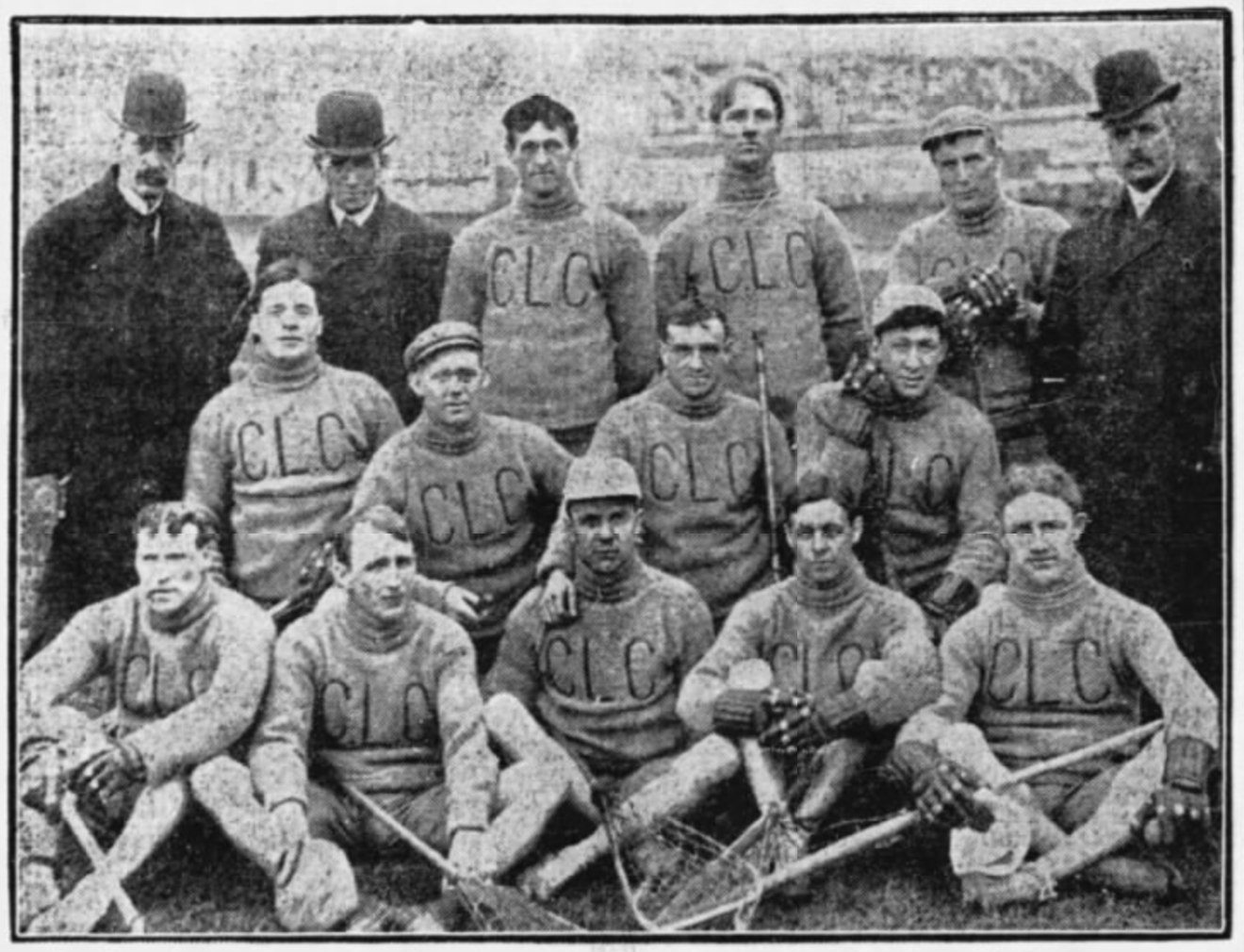
Capital Lacrosse Club in 1907.

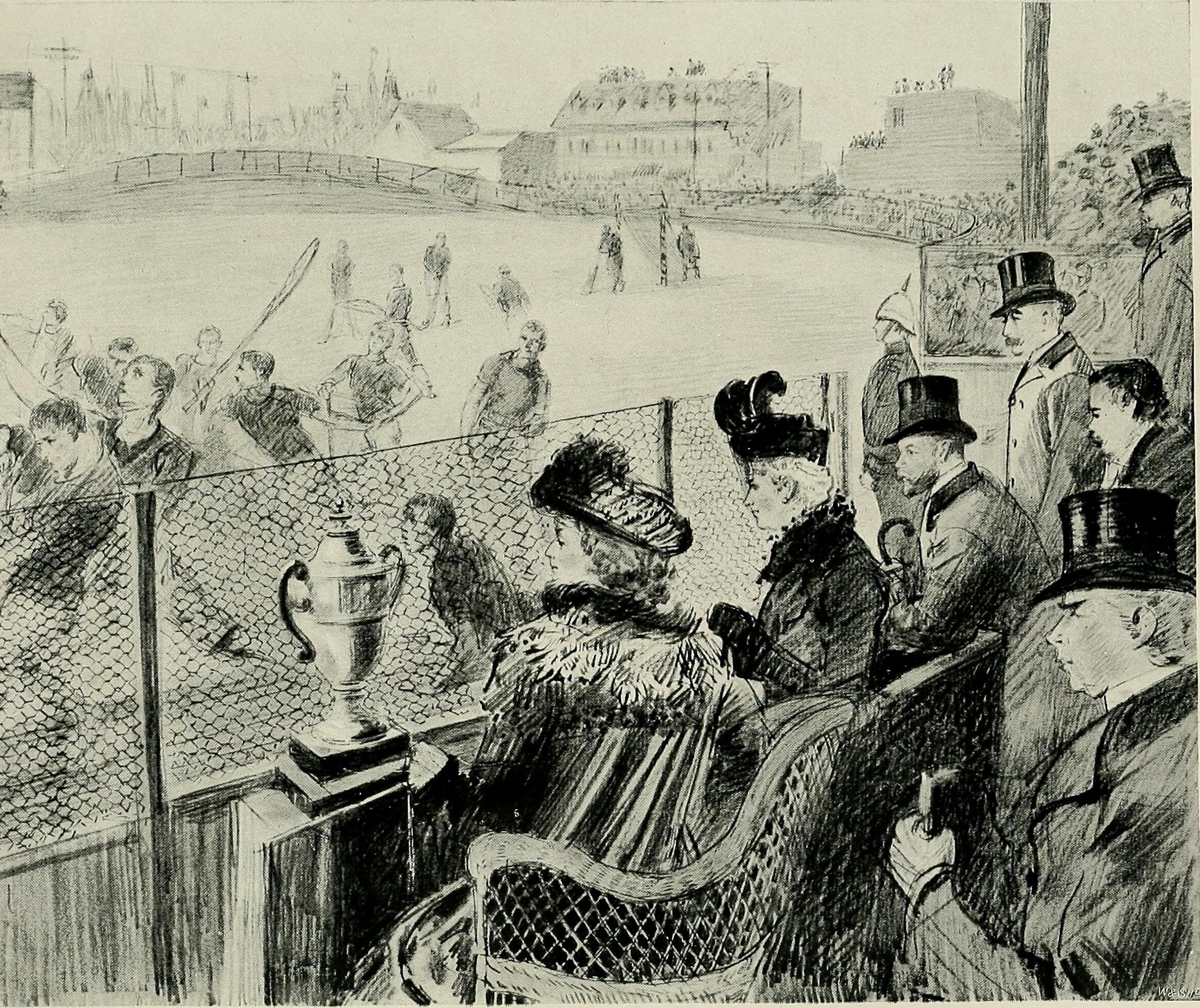
The Ottawa Capitals beat Cornwall for the Minto Cup in 1901

The Capitals were the pre-eminent lacrosse team in Ottawa from the 1890s. When the Minto Cup was donated by the then Governor General Lord Minto to signify the Canadian champions, the Capitals were the first team to win the trophy in 1901. The game was watched by the future King and Queen King George V and Queen Mary in Canada for the royal tour that year.

The Capitals lacrosse and ice hockey teams had a large overlap among its players, and ice hockey executive and Stanley Cup trustee William Foran also had a hand with the lacrosse team. Brothers Eddie and Pat Murphy played both lacrosse and hockey for the Capitals, as did Ovide Lafleur.

Other players on the Capital Lacrosse Club, such as Bouse Hutton and Horace Gaul, played hockey for the Ottawa Hockey Club.

== See also ==
- 1898 AHAC season
- Ice hockey in Ottawa
- List of Stanley Cup champions
- List of Stanley Cup Challenge Games
