= Messia =

Messia may refer to:

- Messia gens, family at ancient Rome
- Pedro Messía de la Cerda, 2nd Marquis of Vega de Armijo (1700–1783); a Spanish naval officer
- a harvesting goddess associated with Tutelina
- Agutazza Messia, an illiterate Sicilian woman (a quilt maker and domestic) from whom Giuseppe Pitre takes most of his tales, also in Italo Calvino's folktales collection

== See also ==
- Messiah
