= Hartland MacDougall =

Canadian ice hockey player

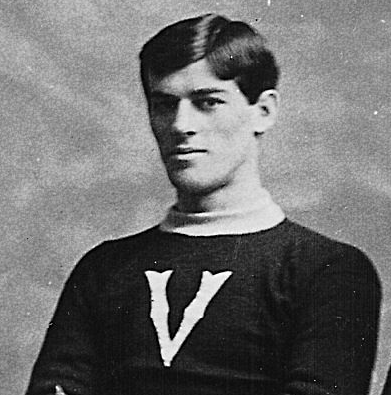
- MacDougall in 1898
- Born: March 10, 1876 Montreal, Quebec, Canada
- Died: April 28, 1947 (aged 71)
- Position: Goaltender, Defence
- Played for: Montreal Victorias
- Playing career: 1894–1899

Hartland Brydges MacDougall (March 10, 1876 – April 28, 1947) was a Canadian ice hockey player and businessman. MacDougall was generally regarded as one of the most versatile players of the pre-NHL era of the sport. He initially played the position of goaltender but ended his career playing point. After hockey, he became a stockbroker and was one of the partners of MacDougall, MacDougall and MacTier, a prominent investment firm in Montreal. In 1976 he was made an honoured member of the Canada Sports Hall of Fame.

== Personal life ==
Born in Montreal, Quebec, MacDougall, was the son of George Campbell MacDougall, Chairman of the Montreal Stock Exchange, and Grace Brydges, daughter of Charles John Brydges, Hudson's Bay Company Land Commissioner. His father and two of his uncles founded the Montreal Stock Exchange in 1874. His aunt, Mrs Hartland St. Clair MacDougall, was the sister of Lady Allan and Mrs Andrew Allan. Hartland was educated at Bishop's College School and Bishops University in Canada.

MacDougall married Edith Reford, a daughter of Robert Wilson Reford, Sr. and the sister of Robert Wilson Reford, who married Elsie Reford, granddaughter of George Stephen, 1st Baron Mount Stephen. MacDougall and his wife were the parents of three sons and two daughters. Their eldest son, Hartland Campbell MacDougall, married Dorothy, the eldest daughter of Lt.-Colonel Herbert Molson (1875–1938) M.C., C.M.G., President of the Molson Brewery. Dorothy (Molson) MacDougall was the niece of Percival Molson, one of Hartland's teammates on the Montreal Victorias, and the sister of Senator Hartland Molson, who succeeded his father to the Presidency of the Molson Brewery. The MacDougalls' second son, Robert Reford MacDougall, married Margaret Meredith Cape, the daughter of Lt.-Colonel Edmund Graves Meredith Cape, whose mother was a first cousin of Frederick Edmund Meredith. The eldest daughter, Grace Edith (1900-1983) married Ward Chipman Pitfield, while their youngest daughter, Lorna, married Brigadier John Herbert Price, OBE, MC, son of Sir William Price of Quebec City, who subsequently became the 4th-generation President of the prominent Price Brothers and Company on the death of his father in a landslide in 1924.

== Sporting career ==
MacDougall played ice hockey at Bishop's College School with future Victorias teammates Ernie McLea and Robert MacDougall (no relation). The three played with the Montreal Victorias during their famous Stanley Cup runs of the late 1890s. He was a member of Stanley Cup winning teams in 1895, 1896, 1897 and 1898. He typically played goaltender and point. Beginning his career as a goaltender in 1894, his success only came when he played defence. Near the end of his career he was paired with Hall of Famer Mike Grant. He left hockey at the end of the 1898 season. He was also a member of the Montreal Amateur Athletic Association, for which he played football as a star fullback.

In the early 1900s, MacDougall joined an investment firm and made a name for himself as a business entrepreneur. He maintained an interest in sports; he excelled at polo and won many national championships before retiring completely from sports in 1928 after a stroke.

In 1919, MacDougall was the founding president of the Quebec Amateur Hockey Association. According to Andy O'Brien of the Montréal Star, in 1957, he was regarded as second only to Lionel Conacher as national all-time, all-round athlete. In 1976, he was made a member of Canada's Sports Hall of Fame.

=== A. McDougall ===
Summary from The Globe and Mail (January 14, 1895) showing H. MacDougall as goalie, not A. MacDougall.

Various sources list three MacDougalls winning the 1895 Stanley Cup with the Montreal Victorias: A. MacDougall, Hartland MacDougall, and Robert MacDougall. Though details of Robert and Hartland are amply recorded in various texts available in literature, further information of A. MacDougall is absent. The known information of A. MacDougall is that he is credited as playing for the Montreal Victorias on January 12, 1895, in a 5-1 victory against the Ottawa HC. However, newspaper evidence such as that shown on the right indicate that Hartland MacDougall actually played this game. In 1895, Hartland played goal three times for the Montreal Victorias between January 12, 1895 and January 26, 1895. He was replaced in goal by Robert Jones after his second loss of the season (a 5-0 loss to Montreal) on January 26, 1895. It is only in Coleman's Trail of the Stanley Cup and works based on Trail, that MacDougall is recorded as playing two games instead of three. The mystery of A. MacDougall runs deep as additionally the team cutlist indicated that Hartland was scheduled to be a starting goalie prior to the season beginning.

== Business career ==
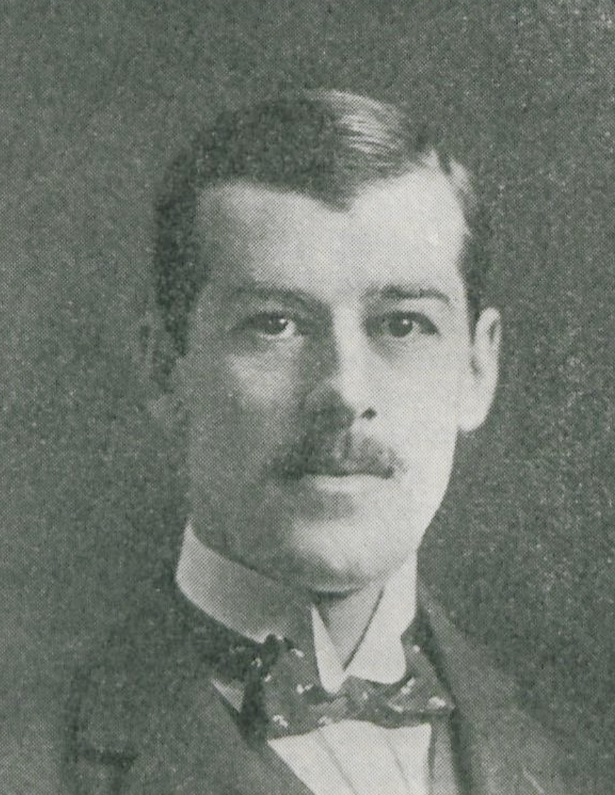
MacDougall circa 1914

About the time that he began his hockey career in 1894, MacDougall began a financial career at the Bank of Montreal. Fellow teammate Robert MacDougall (no relation) joined him there shortly after. In 1899 he left the Bank of Montreal and resigned from Hockey to become a partner in C. Meredith and Company. The senior partner, Charles Meredith, was a cousin of Fred Meredith, who had served as president of the Montreal Victorias for three of the team's Stanley Cups. Hartland became a member of the Montreal Stock Exchange and developed his financial skills, becoming governor in 1909 and chairman in 1914. In 1914, soon after war was declared, he enlisted in the British regiment. By May 1915, he was sent overseas to fight in the Third Canadian division in France until the end of the war. Hartland received several promotions and came home a Major.

MacDougall returned to Canada in 1918, shortly after his uncle died. In the later part of 1920, Hartland resigned from C. Meredith and Company and was offered the family investment business. He accepted it and made Robert MacDougall his business partner, renaming the firm MacDougall and MacDougall. As a financier, MacDougall was involved in the creation of the Montreal Forum and served as director of the Canadian Arena Company. He founded the Montreal Maroons in 1924. Hartland ran MacDougall and MacDougall into World War II, when his sons took over. The firm is still in existence today as MacDougall, MacDougall and MacTier.

== See also ==
- List of Bishop's College School alumni
