= Amateur Hockey Association of Canada =

Amateur ice hockey league in Canada

- Sport: Ice hockey
- Founded: December 8, 1886 (139 years ago)
- First season: 1887
- Folded: December 14, 1898 (127 years ago)
- Country: Canada
- Last champion: Montreal Victorias (1898)
- Most titles: Montreal Hockey Club (7)

The Amateur Hockey Association of Canada (AHAC) was an amateur men's ice hockey league founded on 8 December 1886, in existence until 1898. It was the second ice hockey league organized in Canada, after one in Kingston, Ontario started in 1883. It was organized to provide a longer season to determine the Canadian champion. Prior to its founding, the Canadian championship was determined in a tournament in Montreal. It is the first championship ice hockey league.

The 1893 champion of the league, Montreal Hockey Club was the first winner of the newly introduced Dominion Hockey Challenge Cup (later known as the Stanley Cup). Montreal was awarded the Cup as the champions of the AHAC since the AHAC was considered the top league of Canada.

== History ==
=== Beginnings ===
A meeting was called, for those in favour of the formation of a Dominion hockey association, for the evening of 8 December 1886. Mr. J.G. Monk of the Victoria Hockey Club was asked to send a written invitation to the Ottawa Hockey Club and the Quebec Hockey Club, asking each to send a representative to the meeting. Only Ottawa had responded. The meeting was held at the Victoria Skating Rink in Montreal and attended by the following delegates with Mr. Jack Arnton acting as Chairman and Mr. J. G. Monk as Secretary:

Victoria Hockey Club

- Messr J. G. Monk
- Messer J. Arnton
- Messer J. Muir

Ottawa Hockey Club

- Thomas D. Green
- Hamilton

McGill College

- C. H. Macnutt
- Holden
- Wylde

M.A.A.A.

- E. Sheppard
- Bill Barlow

Crystals Hockey Club

- Robert Laing
- McCaffrey

With all strongly in favour of forming the new association, the name given was the Amateur Hockey Association of Canada and a constitution similar to the one governing lacrosse was adopted but modified to suit hockey. Afterwards, officers were elected for the upcoming inaugural season, who were:

- President — Mr. Thomas D. Green
- First Vice-president — Mr. J. Arnton
- Second Vice-President — Mr. R. Laing
- Secretary-treasurer — Mr. E. Stevenson
- Council — Messrs. James Stewart, J. G. Monk, H. A. Budden, E. Sheppard, Percy Myles

They agreed that the season should run from 1 January 1887 until 15 March 1887.

The teams knew each other. They had competed at the Montreal Winter Carnival ice hockey tournaments from 1883–1885 and the 1886 Dominion Championship:

- 1883 - Montreal Winter Carnival Hockey Tournament (winner McGill),
- 1884 - Montreal Winter Carnival Hockey Tournament (winner Victorias),
- 1885 - Montreal Winter Carnival Hockey Tournament (winner Montreal),
- 1886 - Dominion Championship (winner Crystals)

Thomas D. Green of Ottawa had played on the 1883 McGill hockey team.

=== The game ===
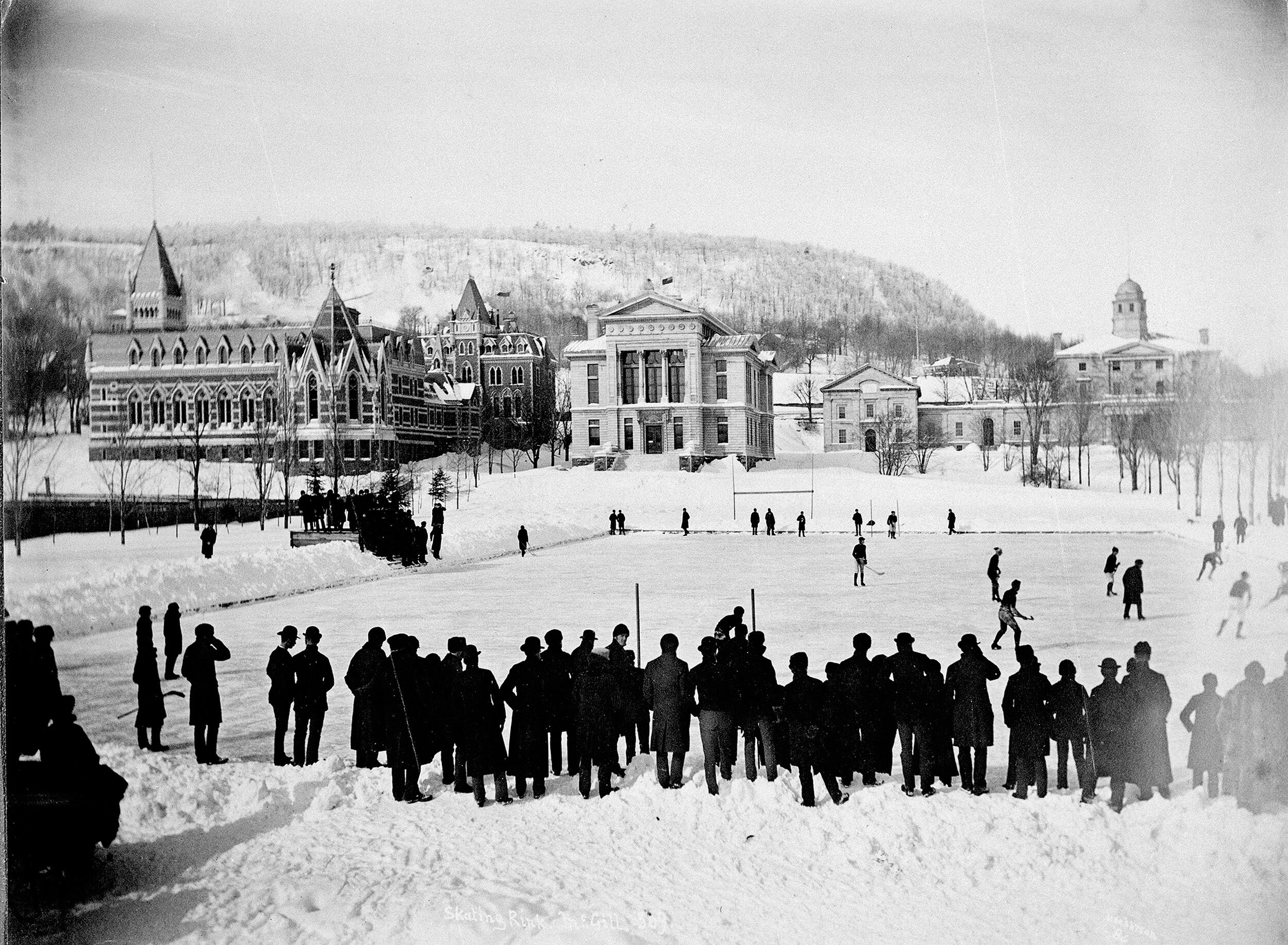
1884 Montreal Winter Carnival game at McGill rink. Unknown teams

In that age, ice hockey was a very different game compared to today: the AHAC rules stated that there were six skaters on each side. These were defined as:

- left-wing
- centre
- right-wing
- rover
- point
- cover-point

The left-wing, centre and right-wing were the forwards, like today. The rover would line up behind the centre, with the point and cover-point following, in an 'I' formation towards the goaltender. The face-offs were at a right angle to today's practice, the centre men facing inwards from the sides of the rink. The goaltenders used no special equipment.

There were no goal nets. The goals were two posts, with no crossbar. An umpire would judge the legality of each score. There were no boards along the sides of the ice, and there were no standard dimensions for a rink, although dimensions were instituted for the positioning of the goal out from the ends of the rink.

A match was two halves of thirty minutes (also to note that in the day, game meant goal by modern definition). Sudden-death overtime was also in place, and a match would continue until a goal was scored in the event of a tie after regulation.

Players in all positions would normally play the entire 60 minutes.

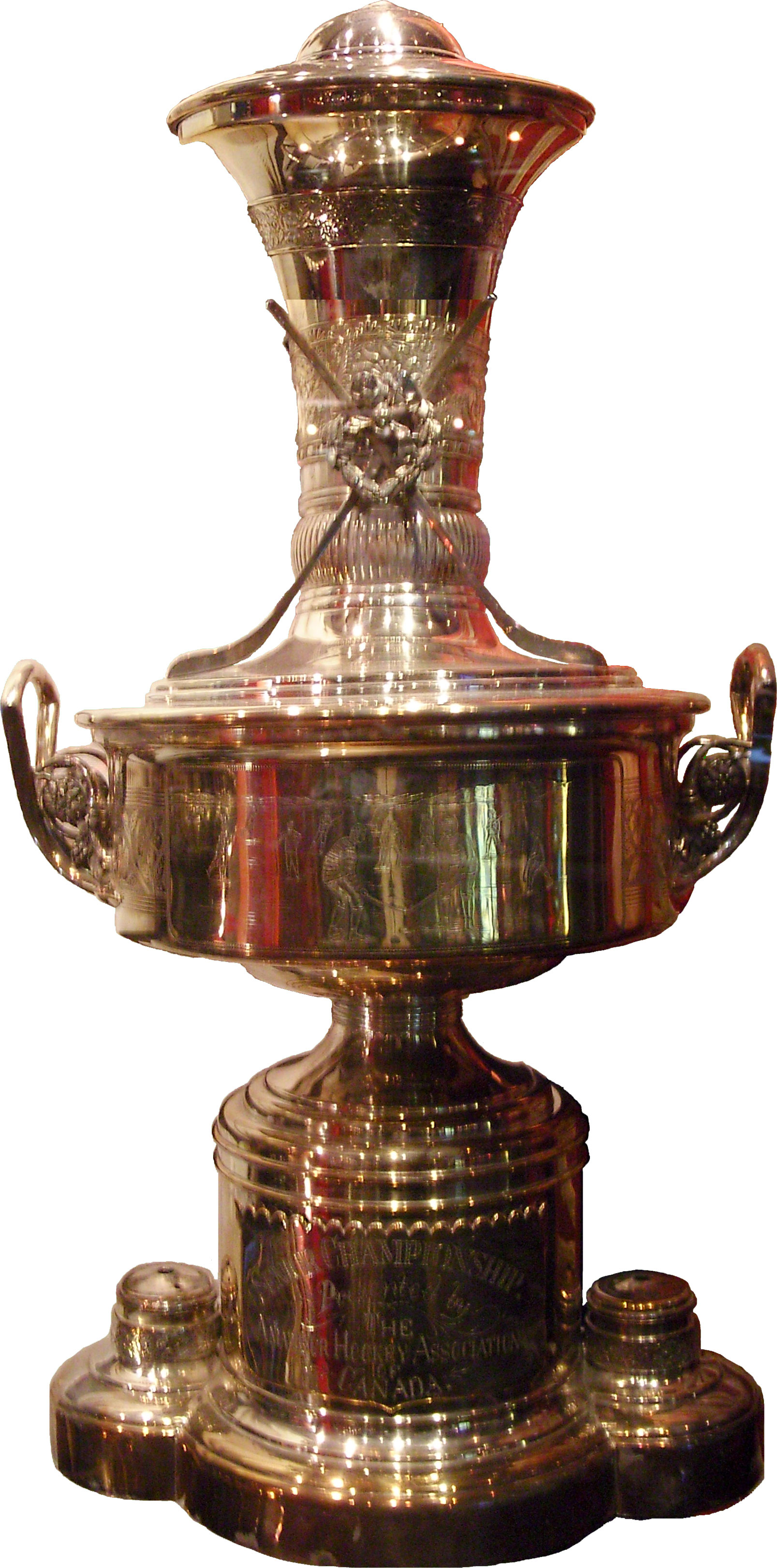
The Senior Championship Trophy of the AHAC. Now on display at the Hockey Hall of Fame in Toronto. Two player figures on each side of the base are lost.

=== Official Rules of the AHAC ===
1. The captains of contesting teams shall agree upon two umpires (one to be stationed at each goal) and a referee.
2. All questions as to games shall be settled by the umpires and their decision shall be final.
3. All disputes on the ice shall be settled by the referee, and his decision shall be final.
4. The game shall be commenced and renewed by a bully in the centre of the rink. Goals, six feet wide and four feet high, which shall be changed after each game, unless otherwise agreed.
5. When a player hits a puck, any one of the same side who at such moment of hitting is nearer the opponent's goal line is out of play and may not touch the puck himself, or in any way prevent any other player from doing so until the puck has been played. A player must always be on his own side of the puck.
6. The puck may be stopped, but not carried or knocked on, by any part of the body. No player shall raise his stick above his shoulder. Charging from behind, tripping, collaring, kicking or shinning, shall not be allowed, and any player after having been twice warned by the referee, it shall become his duty to rule the player off for that match.
7. When the puck gets off the ice behind the goals it shall be taken by the referee to five yards at right angles from the goal line and there faced. When the puck goes off the ice at the sides it shall be taken by the referee at five yards at right angles from the boundary line and there faced.
8. The goalkeeper must not, during play, lie, kneel or sit upon the ice, but must maintain a standing position.
9. Hockey sticks shall not be more than three inches wide at any point.
10. Goal shall be scored when the puck shall have passed between the goalposts and below the top and passed from in front below an imaginary line across the top of posts.
11. The puck must be made of vulcanized rubber, one inch thick all through, and three inches in diameter.
12. A team shall be composed of seven players who shall be bona fide members of the club they represent. No player shall be allowed to play on more than one team during a season except in a case of a bona fide change of residence.
13. Two half hours with an intermission of ten minutes between will be time allowed for matches. A match will be decided by the team winning the greatest number of games during that time. In case of a tie after playing the specified two half hours, play will continue until one side secures a game unless otherwise agreed upon between the captains before the match.
14. No change of players must be made after a match has commenced except for reasons of accidents or injury during the game.
15. Should any player be injured during a match and compelled to leave the field his side shall have the option of putting on a spare man from the reserve to equalize the teams; in the event of any dispute between the captains as to the injured player's fitness to continue the game the matter shall at once be decided by the referee.
16. Should a game be temporarily stopped, by the infringement of any of the rules the puck shall be brought back and a bully take place.

Source: Montreal Gazette

=== Seasons format ===
The AHAC operated on two different systems in its lifetime: the challenge system, where a championship team would face a new challenger each week for the championship, and the series system, which corresponds to the regular season found in the NHL today. With the exception of 1888, the challenge system was exclusively used in the AHAC before the advent of the Stanley Cup, while the series system became the norm in 1893, the first year the Cup was contested.

The first championship team of the AHAC was the Montreal Crystals, having unofficially being declared the champions before the AHAC. The first title change occurred on January 14, 1887, when the Montreal Victorias defeated the champions 4–0. The Victorias would hold the title until the very last challenge game when the Crystals won 3–2 in their third successive challenge. Because of the Vics' long run as champions, it was decided to switch to the series system in 1888.

The series system was a success, although a tie atop the standings between the Vics and the Montreal Hockey Club (Montreal HC), and the subsequent scheduling of the tiebreaker game caused much trouble when the game was scheduled at a time when two Victorias players were injured, at the home venue of the Montreal HC. However, teams from outside Montreal incurred huge travelling expenses, which led the AHAC to revert to the challenge system.

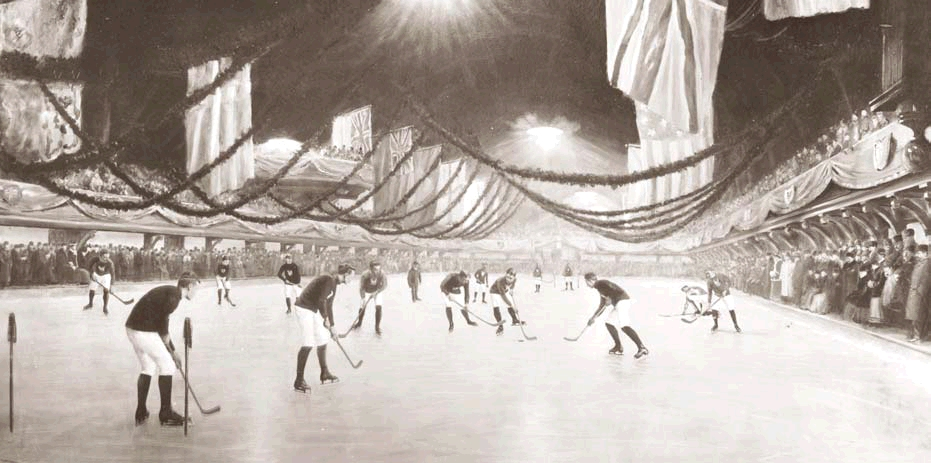
1893 Hockey game

=== First Stanley Cup ===
In 1893, the first year since 1888 where the AHAC played under a series system, the Montreal Hockey Club lost their first game against the Ottawa Hockey Club and proceeded to win their next seven en route to the championship. Lord Stanley announced that his challenge trophy (later known simply as the Stanley Cup) for the best amateur hockey team in Canada would be presented to the Montreal Hockey Club on May 15, 1893, as initial champion. At the time, the Montreal Hockey Club was in a dispute with its parent organization, the Montreal Amateur Athletic Association (MAAA). The hockey club was adamant about refusing the trophy, while the directors of the MAAA decided to accept the trophy, considering it came from the Governor General of Canada. Thus, the trophy was accepted by the MAAA, but with none of the hockey officials of the hockey club present.

After accepting the trophy, the hockey club remained adamant about returning the trophy that was presented to them. In the end, the MAAA investigated into why its hockey club wanted to refuse and return the trophy, even though such an action would damage the reputation of the MAAA. It was believed that the people who were in charge of running their team were, in fact, not representative of the team itself, and when the hockey club asked for a loan of $175 in start-up expenses for the 1894 season, it was flatly refused (the first time the MAAA refused anything to the hockey club). Inexplicably, the hockey club reversed its position, and the next few months saw a gradual schism between the MAAA and the club. Indeed, the inscriptions on the Cup when it was successfully defended in 1894 only stated "Montreal HC". The MAAA, at one point, considered the hockey club to have seceded from the organization that bore them. The issue would be finally resolved in later years, after various attempts at reconciliation.

=== Dissolution ===
At the annual meeting in December 1897, the Ottawa Capitals applied to join the AHAC but were turned down by the AHAC executive. The Capitals applied again at the annual meeting held in Montreal on December 10, 1898, leading to "a cataclysm in the hockey world." This time, the AHAC executive voted in favour of admitting the Capitals for league membership.

The Globe noted that the Capitals were "questionably amateur", referring to the paying of players. This led to the representatives of the Quebec Bulldogs, Montreal Victorias and Ottawa Hockey Club opting to withdraw from the association. The representative of the Montreal Hockey Club asked the group to reconsider but was declined, after which point Montreal HC also withdrew.

The withdrawing teams then met at the Windsor Hotel the same day. On December 14, the group met again and organized the Canadian Amateur Hockey League (CAHL), adding the Montreal Shamrocks for a complete conversion of the AHAC into the CAHL. The new league adopted the existing constitution of the AHAC, with the exception that new teams required unanimous approval of the CAHL executive in order to join the league.

== Teams ==
Senior Division
Season	Teams	Format	Champions
1887	McGill HC, Montreal HC, Montreal Crystals, Montreal Victorias, Ottawa HC	Challenge	Montreal Crystals (final challenge)
1888	McGill HC, Montreal HC, Montreal Crystals, Montreal Victorias	Series	Montreal HC (playoff vs. Victorias)
1888–89	Halifax (Dartmouth) Chebuctos, McGill HC, Montreal HC, Montreal Crystals, Montreal Victorias, Quebec HC	Challenge	Montreal HC (final challenge)
1890	Montreal HC, Montreal Dominions, Montreal Victorias, Quebec HC	Challenge	Montreal HC (final challenge)
1891	Montreal Crescents, Montreal HC, Montreal Shamrocks, Montreal Victorias, Ottawa HC, Quebec HC	Challenge	Montreal HC (final challenge)
1892	Montreal Britannias, Montreal HC, Montreal Shamrocks, Ottawa HC, Quebec HC	Challenge	Montreal HC (final challenge)
1893	Montreal HC†, Montreal Crystals, Montreal Victorias, Ottawa HC and Quebec HC	Series	Montreal HC (best record)
1894	Montreal HC†, Montreal Crystals, Montreal Victorias, Ottawa HC and Quebec HC	Series	Montreal HC (playoff vs. Victorias and Ottawa)
1895	Montreal HC, Montreal Crystals, Montreal Victorias†, Ottawa HC and Quebec HC	Series	Victorias (best record)
1896	Montreal HC, Montreal Shamrocks, Montreal Victorias, Ottawa HC and Quebec HC	Series	Victorias (best record)
1897	Montreal HC, Montreal Shamrocks, Montreal Victorias† (December 1896), Ottawa HC and Quebec HC	Series	Victorias (best record)
1898	Montreal HC, Montreal Shamrocks, Montreal Victorias†, Ottawa HC and Quebec HC	Series	Victorias (best record)

† Stanley Cup winner

Under the challenge system, the league championship would change hands until the end of the playing season. Under the series system, the league championship was only determined at the end of the season by best overall record or playoff.

Source Information

According to Arthur Farrell's book of 1899, "Hockey: Canada's Royal Winter Game", Montreal Crystals are recorded as champions in 1887, and the Montreal Hockey Club is recorded as the winner from 1888–1894.

According to Ultimate Hockey, the play between 1887 and 1892 occurred in the challenge format and the title of champion could change after every series. The final champion at the end of the season's worth of challenges would be considered 'Dominion of Canada' champion.

== See also ==
- List of Stanley Cup champions
- List of pre-NHL seasons
- List of ice hockey leagues
- Stanley Cup Challenge Games
