= Deborah Pellow =

American anthropologist (1945–2025)

- Born: March 21, 1945; Los Angeles, California, U.S.
- Died: May 29, 2025 (aged 80); Syracuse, New York, U.S.
- Known for: Work on urbanization and proxemics in West Africa

Academic background
- Education: University of Pennsylvania (B.A. 1967); Northwestern University (M.A.1968, Ph.D. 1974)

Academic work
- Discipline: Anthropology
- Institutions: Syracuse University

Deborah Pellow (March 21, 1945 – May 29, 2025) was an American anthropologist. She was a professor and later, a professor emerita at Syracuse University’s Maxwell School of Citizenship and Public Affairs. She was known for her work on urbanization and the anthropology of space and place in West Africa, particularly in Ghana.

== Early life and education ==
Born in Los Angeles to Frieda Kaplan and David Pellow, she grew up in New York City and Philadelphia. She attended the Akiba Academy in Center City, Philadelphia. Deborah Pellow received her bachelor’s degree in anthropology from the University of Pennsylvania in 1967. She obtained an MA (1968) and a PhD (1974) from Northwestern University, where she completed her dissertation on the topic, "Women in Accra: a study in options."

== Academic career ==
Pellow was a founding director of the Space and Place Initiative at the Global Affairs Institute at the Maxwell School. She also taught in the school's Master of Social Science course. Her research was at the intersection of proxemics, ethnicity, micro-politics and conflict, feminist thought, women and gender. From 2009 to 2011, she served as the president of the Society for Urban National and Transnational Anthropology, a wing of the American Anthropological Association. She chaired the University Senate Library Committee and Chancellor Search Committee of Syracuse University. She was a Senior Research Associate at the Program for the Advancement of Research on Conflict & Collaboration. She also lived in northern Nigeria where she studied Hausa. Later, she conducted fieldwork in China and Japan.

== Personal life and death ==
Deborah Pellow was first married to the American philosopher, Irving Thalberg Jr. (1930–1987), the son of 1920s and 1930s Hollywood producer Irving Thalberg and Academy Award-winning actress Norma Shearer. After her husband's death, Pellow married in 1991, the American mystery writer, David Cole (1936–2015). She served on the boards of The Friends of Chamber Music, and the non-profit, Francis House, a home for the terminally-ill.

Pellow died in Syracuse on May 29, 2025, at the age of 80. A memorial service for Deborah Pellow was held at the Hendricks Chapel on the campus of Syracuse University on September 12, 2025.

== Selected awards and honors ==
- Lifetime Achievement Award, Critical Urban Anthropology Association (CUAA) (2021)
- William Wasserstrom Prize for the Teaching of Graduate Students (2019)
- Faculty Advisor of the Year Award (2016)
- Fulbright Senior Research Scholar, Institute of International Education (2005/06)
- Fulbright-Hays Faculty Research Grant – alternate (2005)
- Appleby Mosher Fund, Maxwell School, Syracuse University (2002)
- Appleby Mosher Fund, Maxwell School, Syracuse University (1995)
- Fulbright IIE Teaching Fellowship, Osaka University and Ritsumeikan University, Japan (1991/92)

== Selected works ==
- Africa and Urban Anthropology: Theoretical and Methodological Contributions from Contemporary Fieldwork, Taylor & Francis (2023)
- A New African Elite: Place in the Making a Bridge Generation, United Kingdom: Berghahn Books (2022)
- Living Afar, Longing for Home: The Role of Place in the Creation of the Dagomba New Elite
- Landlords and Lodgers: Socio-Spatial Organization in an Accra Zongo. Pbk. Chicago: University of Chicago Press (2008)
- Setting Boundaries: The Anthropology of Spatial and Social Organization, editor and author. Westport CT: Bergin and Garvey (1996)
- Ghana: Coping with Uncertainty, with Naomi Chazan Boulder: Westview Press (1986)
- Women in Accra: Options for Autonomy Algonac, MI: Reference Publications, Inc. (1977)
