= George Solomos =

American writer (1925–2010)

- Born: George Paul Solomos; September 16, 1925; Detroit, Michigan, US
- Died: November 8, 2010 (aged 85); London, UK
- Other name: Themistocles Hoetis
- Occupations: Writer; filmmaker; editor

George Paul Solomos (September 16, 1925 – November 8, 2010), also known as Themistocles Hoetis from 1948 to 1958, was an American publisher, poet, filmmaker and novelist.

== Family background ==
G. P. Solomos was born in Detroit, Michigan, United States, in 1925, the youngest of five children of Greek-born Christian parents.

The Solomos family were descendants of tobacco tycoon Count Nicolas Solomonee from Venice, Italy. They were olive oil producers who settled in Greece before the end of the Greek War of Independence (1821–1829). They were relatives of the Greek poet Dionysios Solomos who had lived on the Greek island Zante (Zakynthos) most of his adult life; his most famous poem "Hymn to Liberty" is the Greek National Anthem.

His father had left Sparta because of a family tragedy when he was still a teenager. Having been educated in the English language he decided to make his way to the USA. His mother – also from Sparta – was taken to the States by her two older brothers for similar tragic reasons as his father. His parents were introduced on landing in New York about 1910, and decided to marry and stay in the United States for a while.

George Solomos published and wrote under the name Themistocles Hoetis, the surname of his mother's family, from 1948 to 1958, after being advised by some relatives that his views could attract trouble for his family.

== Early life ==
George was born and raised in Detroit, an American city that became known as "Motor City" – the center of the US car industry – as well as a wellspring of much great popular music, from soul to heavy metal and techno. Prior to Motown, jazz had moved from up from the clubs of Chicago to Detroit in the 1920s, and George spent much of his teenage years in jazz clubs. His father ran a large Mediterranean delicatessen and general food store on Vermont and Henry Street, right near to Michigan Avenue.

George Solomos joined the USAF at the age of 17 after changing his birth certificate with his father's permission. After a short period of training, he was almost immediately shipped to Britain, where he became a radio operator in an American B-17 Flying Fortress bomber based in an airfield in East Anglia.

After his plane was shot down on his eleventh bombing mission to Germany; the crew bailed out of the burning bomber and Solomos ended up landing tangled in the branches of an apple tree in North East France, near to the Belgian / Dutch border. He was rescued by a French grandmother and her granddaughter. After a night in the farmhouse he was passed to the French Resistance. He was taken on a journey of more than 200 miles to a little village north of Paris called Evereux. He stayed in the village with the caretaker of Château de Beaufresne, which had belonged to the famous impressionist painter, Mary Cassatt. The chateau was being used as a residence for German officers. At this point, he was given a new – fake – ID card with a swastika stamp. He was then passed to other members of the Resistance, who helped the young airman cross occupied France and eventually enter Spain, from where he was sent to Gibraltar, and then back to his airbase near Ipswich.

== Later life ==
From 1948 to 1958, George Solomos used the pen-name Themistocles Hoetis. A relative had warned him that he could bring shame to the family with his outspoken political views, which had developed in response to both the war and the de-programming that he received back in the United States – a standard "treatment" for all servicemen who had been in close contact with Communists. Under this name, he and Albert Beneviste published and edited a magazine called ZERO: A Review of Literature and Art. The first issue contained the famous attack on Richard Wright by James Baldwin, followed by a short story by Wright. Among the prominent writers featured in the magazine were Samuel Beckett, Paul Bowles, Christopher Isherwood, Kenneth Patchen, and Thomas Mann's eldest son, Klaus Mann. Zero Press from 1956 also published novels and a collection of stories by Gore Vidal. The magazine Zero ran from 1949 to 1956. Its first two issues were published in Paris in 1949, the rest in Tangiers, Mexico City and in New York. A first anthology of Zero was published in 1956, another without his involvement in 1974 by The New York Times. An additional number was issued in Philadelphia in 1980. It reported on the very violent action taken by the Philadelphia Police Department against the black revolutionary commune MOVE.

He married Gidske Anderson in London in 1952. She had been with the wartime resistance in Norway. She met Solomos in Paris after the War. They both shared a love of jazz and, as a neighbor, she had asked to borrow some of his records. She was then working for the Norwegian newspaper Arbeiderbladet and later became deputy chair of the Norwegian Nobel Committee. She died in 1993.

Having published his novel The Man Who Went Away in 1952, Solomos received a grant from the Rockefeller Foundation in 1953 to live and write in Mexico City, where he completed his still unpublished book Thermopylae, a novel about war and the ideals of ancient Sparta.

In 1958, at Detroit Town Hall, he legally changed the name he had used for the last ten years while publishing ZERO – Themistocles Hoetis – back to his birth name of George Paul Solomos.

From 1958 to 1960, Solomos was asked by Dr. Bascilius (Head of Humanities) at Wayne State University, where he had completed a one-year course after the war ended in 1945 – which was his entitlement as a US veteran – to propose and edit work for publication by the Wayne State University Press (WSU Press). The first book he designed for the WSU Press was The Poems of William Blake, which won the award of Best Poetry Anthology of the year 1958 from the Poetry Society of America. The next year, 1959, he had prepared a version of the anti-nuclear tract by Bertrand Russell, Common Sense and Nuclear Warfare which the WSU Press had already proofed and printed. It was withdrawn under threat from large industrial sponsors who threatened to withhold funding. Solomos left the United States soon after this and returned to Europe.

== Films ==
Solomos made two films in Italy (1961–63). The first was a 20-minute film called Echo in the Village, which was shot on two 35mm cameras over five days in a small village called Cappadocia. It is in black and white and stars the town's inhabitants. It is based on his original story about a grandfather helping a boy to learn English so that he can leave the village and go to America.

Solomos was re-united with many of the people who had featured in the film, including the boy who had played the young shepherd, when he returned to Cappadocia in 2002, on the 40th anniversary of the film. A public screening was arranged in the village and a programme about the event was broadcast on the State TV channel.

The second film is called Natika, and stars John Drew Barrymore, who was at the time living in Rome, and a young Welsh woman called Maureen Gavin, for whom this was to be her only major film appearance. The film was made on a larger budget than Echo in the Village, and was written and directed by Solomos, as well as using the same personnel as his previous film.

The film concerns a destructive romance between a young harpist studying in Rome, and a louche playboy and heir to Europe's wealthy corporate and governing class, played by Barrymore.

The film was largely financed by a rich young American, Gray Frederickson, who was based in Tehran tending his Oklahoma father's oil wells but was attracted to Rome to break into the movie business. After taking the film to be re-edited before its completion, Fredrikson presented it at various film festivals as his production debut and went on to become a major Hollywood producer (e.g. Apocalypse Now).

Solomos was also a mentor to the young George Moorse, who was one of the directors of radical German cinema in the 1960s. Moorse's first film In Side Out (1964) – with playwright Tom Stoppard in the cast – was made with Gérard Vandenberg, the cinematographer who worked on Solomos's two films.

== Travels and further projects ==
Tangier and Morocco

Solomos was a regular visitor to Morocco, where his friends Paul Bowles and Jane Bowles had lived for many years. Solomos had first gone there in 1950 with Irving Thalberg, Jr., the son of the famous film producer of the same name, who later became a professor of philosophy. An article in the fashion magazine Flair, which was aimed at the New York literati, published with a transparent cover by the Condé Nast Publications heiress Fleur Cowles, described Solomos as:

an apprentice Yankee Balzac – and a be-bop hipster perched on a cliff outside Tangier celebrating the virtues of hashish...

– which was based on the testimony of Gore Vidal, who had met him on a visit to Morocco.

After Solomos returned to Madrid, he took the first Orient Express train to run through Greece to Istanbul since the end of WWII. He then went from Salonika to Athens and on to Sparta to visit his family home, through a country ravaged by war.

London

Solomos then moved to what is now known as Swinging London in the 1960s, and was soon involved in its bohemian underground. He published David Chapman, a young poet who was briefly incarcerated in an Insane asylum because of his heroin addiction, and wrote a powerful poem about his experiences which was called "Withdrawal". A book, which also contained pictures by Chapman, was published by Solomos in 1964 with help from philanthropist and wealthy heir Jonathan Bryan Guinness, 3rd Baron Moyne – a Conservative Party (UK) MP at the time – who paid for a full-page advertisement in the Conservative Monday Club publication, along with a voucher entitling members to a reduced-price copy. Guinness had the reputation of someone whose political instincts would now be recognised as libertarian conservatism.

A reading by David Chapman was held that year in the Institute of Contemporary Arts (ICA) in London. Solomos also commissioned a soundtrack from the experimental jazz combo Spontaneous Music Ensemble. Solomos brought a print of his short film Echo in the Village to the UK in the early 1960s and was invited onto the BBC television show Late Night Line Up (1964–72), where he was interviewed by Joan Bakewell. His appearance followed Bakewell's interview that same evening with American theatre and film director Joseph Losey. Solomos's next major publishing venture was in 1968, when he produced a film magazine called FIBA, which won the prize for the Best Film Publication at the Venice Film Festival (La Biennale di Venezia) that year.

It was financed largely by the young Japanese Fluxus artist Yoko Ono. She later introduced him to her partner, John Lennon of The Beatles, and they asked him to arrange US showings of some films they had made, including Smile and Bottoms. Solomos arranged for them to be premiered at the Chicago International Film Festival in 1970, and took the movies on a series of screenings around the USA.

Ireland

From 1970 to 1972, Solomos was the Film correspondent for The Irish Times, but was asked to leave Ireland by the Irish government after commenting unfavourably on the influence of the Roman Catholic Church on Irish culture. He had also infuriated the Irish government for arranging the free distribution of The Little Red Schoolbook, which was being given away free in England at the time by the National Union of School Students. He was seen onto a ferry to Britain by Charles Haughey, who later wrote to him and offered to let him return.

Solomos returned to London, where he managed to sell a film outline to Ringo Starr that would be a potential vehicle for mutual friend (and star of the 1959 film Shadows directed by John Cassavetes ), actor Ben Carruthers. This financed a trip to Sparta in Greece, homeland of the Solomos family, where he visited his family's village.

USA

In 1974, Solomos moved to Philadelphia and lived in a house opposite the MOVE commune when it was notoriously bombed from a police helicopter, a tragedy that killed six adult residents and five children. Solomos published one last copy of ZERO in the early 1980s, which was dedicated to John Africa and the members of MOVE, many of whom were still in prison in the United States in 2009.

After moving to the first apartment block in the United States built with its own community studio and cable TV facility, Solomos started a reality TV series featuring some of the block's residents – which was later credited with being the inspiration for the NBC series The Golden Girls.

He also arranged for a filmed interview with Mumia Abu-Jamal on death row in Philadelphia – the last instance of such an interview, since the law was changed afterwards to prevent any similar media attention. The resulting film is on YouTube in three parts.

Europe

In 1986, Solomos returned to France to find the villagers who had helped him escape from the Nazis in occupied France. The International Herald Tribune managed to track down the son of the granddaughter who had initially rescued him from the apple tree and hidden him in the cellar.

Since 1999, Solomos published the on-line version of his film and culture magazine fiba.

In 1999, he was a guest at the Havana Film Festival, where he showed the Mumia Abu-Jamal documentary and a short film featuring Alice Walker, as well as being interviewed by Cuban television.

Death

George Solomos died at home in Catford, SE London, on November 8, 2010.

His second book is currently being translated into Spanish for publication in the next year. It is called Villa Alba, and is a novel based on some time he spent in Franco's Spain in the 1950s.
