= Asa Benveniste =

American poet and publisher (1925–1990)

- Born: August 25, 1925; New York City, US
- Died: April 13, 1990 (aged 64); London, UK
- Occupations: Poet; typographer; publisher
- Known for: Co-founder of Trigram Press
- Spouse: Pip (Penelope) Benveniste
- Partner: Agnetha Falk

Asa Benveniste (August 25, 1925 – April 13, 1990) was an American-born poet, typographer and publisher.

== Early years ==
Benveniste was born in New York, US, and settled in England in the 1950s.

== Career ==
After World War II, Benveniste, at this time known as Albert, lived in Paris, France, and in 1948 co-founded the Zero Press with George Solomos (who was then known as Thermistocles Hoetis). Their first publication in spring 1949 was Zero Magazine. One of the poets they published was Lionel Ziprin, whose recollections of Benveniste appeared in Jewish Quarterly: "'He was a Turkish Jew; he had a very good poetry magazine, called The Trigram. I knew him in college; he went into the army. Later, he stayed in Paris. ...He and a guy called Themistocles Hoetis, this guy George Solomos, published a magazine called Zero; George came to New York, and he said: Give us what you got. So I gave them "Math Glass", and he published it and somehow T. S. Eliot got a part of it, and wrote me a nice little letter about it.'"

Following the second issue of Zero, which featured work by Paul Bowles, James Baldwin and Matta, Benveniste moved to London, then later Cornwall and Kent, where he wrote a full-length radio play titled Tangier for the Traveller for the BBC Home Service.

Besides being a poet, he also worked as a printer, a typographer, and as a book designer. In London during 1965, he co-founded and managed the pioneering Trigram Press, which published work by George Barker, Tom Raworth, Jack Hirschman, J. H. Prynne, David Meltzer, B. S. Johnson, Jim Dine, Jeff Nuttall, Gavin Ewart, Ivor Cutler, Anselm Hollo, and Lee Harwood, among others. In the early 1970s, Trigram Press books were distributed by Allison and Busby, where Benveniste's close friend John Latimer Smith was sales and production director.

In 1966, Trigram Press produced the second and final issue of a little magazine called Residu, which included work by Alexander Trocchi, William S. Burroughs, Harold Norse, Gregory Corso, Harry Fainlight, Gerard Malanga and other Beat Generation and underground writers. The magazine's editors / publishers were Dan and Jill Richter.

In the 1980s, Benveniste and his second partner Agnetha Falk moved to Hebden Bridge in West Yorkshire, where they operated a secondhand bookshop. When Benveniste died in 1990, he was buried in the graveyard of Heptonstall church, with a gravestone that reads: "Foolish Enough to Have Been a Poet". He was both pleased and amused that his grave was to be within speaking distance of Sylvia Plath's own gravestone a few feet away.

The artist Pip (Penelope) Benveniste, Asa's first wife, was also his partner in the Trigram Press project and provided the funds for its establishment. Pip's middle son (and Asa's stepson) Paul Vaughan was the highly skilled printer at Trigram Press, operating the classic Gutenberg Printing Press to a very high standard and developing groundbreaking results with silkscreen images for books, limited-edition prints and other outlets. Pip died on August 30, 2010; she is now recognised as an important post-war British modernist painter. One aspect of her work – designs for hand-woven rugs – was launched by her youngest son, Mark Vaughan, with her blessing, in 2012.
