= Schools Action Union =

British students' union for school children

- Predecessor: Free Schools Campaign
- Founded: 1969
- Dissolved: 1974
- Headquarters: North Gower Street, London
- Location: United Kingdom
- Publication: Rebel and Vanguard

The Schools Action Union (SAU) was a British students' union for school children active in the early 1970s. It formed at the Free School Campaign (FSC) conference of January 1969 from attendees who did not want to follow the non-political path chosen by the FSC. The SAU set out a list of aims that included the abolition of corporal punishment in schools and the transition of all schools to become comprehensive and co-educational. A number of journals were published and the union, which became dominated by Maoists, organised significant school strikes in May 1972.

The SAU dissolved in 1974 but the abolition campaign continued and saw corporal punishment banned nationally in all state schools in 1986; though non-comprehensive and single sex schools continue.

== Formation and aims ==
Movement towards a national schools union had begun in the late 1960s, inspired by the university student unions. Students at Manchester's Myles Platting Secondary Modern School went on strike in March 1968 in protest at the use of the tawse for corporal punishment and afterwards formed the Manchester Union of Secondary Students. This was quickly followed by the founding of the Swansea Union of Progressive Students, the Bristol Sixth Form Alliance and the Cardiff Union of Secondary Schools. Tricia Jaffe, who later became a founding member of the Schools Action Union (SAU), formed the Free Schools Campaign (FSC) in October 1968, being inspired by a visit to Paris.

The FSC held a conference in January 1969 that brought together various like-minded organisations including the Secondary School Students Union and regional groups from Leicester and Scotland. The conference drew protests from the National Front, requiring a large police presence, and was covered by ITV's World in Action current affairs programme. The FSC conference decided that the organisation should proceed on a non-political basis. However, a splinter group disagreed and decided to form the SAU.

The SAU started after the conference with 20 regional branches and modelled itself on the French student organisations of the 1960s (which had led the unrest of May 1968). It described itself as a political organisation with a "Marxist-Leninist-Liberal broad front"; the Daily Telegraph described it as "extreme Maoist" in nature. Indeed, writers Martin Hoyles, Alison Assiter and Avedon Carol described the SAU as highly militant Maoists, especially in comparison to the National Union of School Students (NUSS, founded in 1972).

The SAU viewed the schools of the time as "instruments of capitalist oppression" and set out a series of aims to reform the education sector:

- Control of schools to be placed into the hands of their pupils and staff
- Freedom of speech and freedom of assembly to be guaranteed
- Corporal punishment in schools to be abolished
- School uniforms to be abolished
- All schools to become comprehensive and co-educational
- Teachers' salaries to be increased

A list of demands was sent to Edward Short, the Secretary of State for Education in March 1969.

== Early campaigns ==
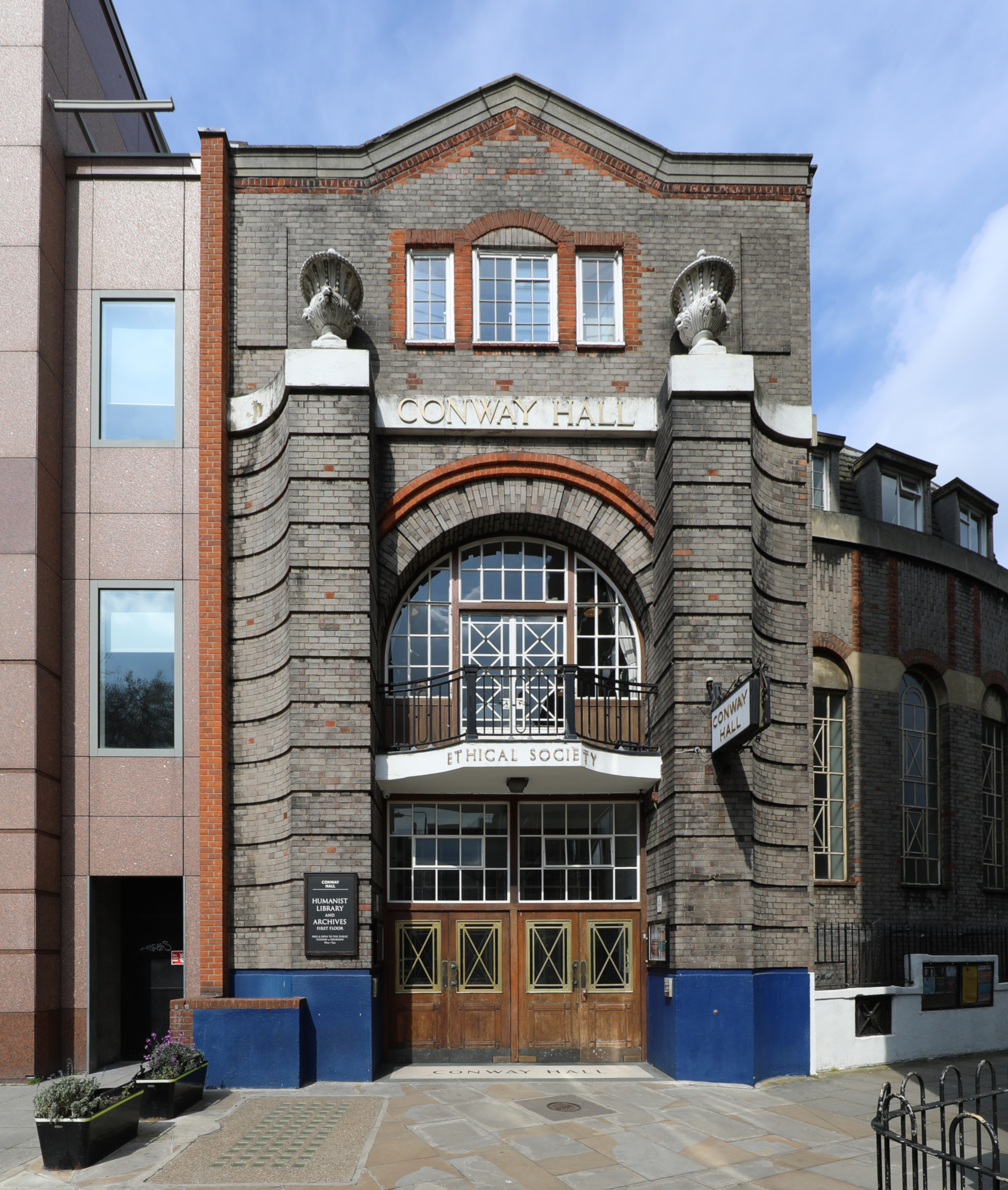
Conway Hall Ethical Society

On 2 March 1969 the SAU held a demonstration attended by 700 people at the Department for Education and County Hall, London (headquarters of the London Educational Authority). By summer that year the union had 23 regional branches and had held three conferences in Birmingham and London. The SAU lent its support to the 20 November 1969 teachers strike. In its first year the organisation was funded largely by the subscriptions of middle-class older pupils at grammar schools. The organisation had some members from primary schools but the majority were older secondary school pupils.

Bob Labi served as the SAU press officer from 1969 to 1970. The union published two national journals: Rebel and Vanguard. These were fortnightly, priced at 3-pence each and ran until 1970. A number of regional journals were also published: Pupil Power (Liverpool), Slug (Manchester), Red Herring (Hemel Hempstead), Intercourse (Secondary Schools) and the Free Schools Campaign Journal. The Agitprop organisation assisted with the SAU publications (the union's office on North Gower Street was adjacent to those of Agitprop and the Gay News) and funding for this was also provided by the Gay Liberation Front.

The SAU backed a 1970 campaign by the National Council for Civil Liberties against compulsory religious education and corporal punishment in schools. The same year an SAU meeting planned to be held at the London School of Economics (LSE) had to be relocated after a Conservative Party member of the House of Lords asked why the LSE was promoting "subversion" activities. The meeting went ahead at the Conway Hall Ethical Society where attendees were shown films, attended lectures and received instruction on the manufacture of silk screen posters. A Communist Party official giving a lecture was booed by the SAU members who were a mix of Maoists and anarchists. Following the Ted Heath's promises to end the era of strikes, and particularly after his 18 June general election victory, the SAU received an influx of working class members.

The SAU distributed copies of the controversial Little Red Schoolbook, a handbook for schoolchildren written by Danish teachers that was censored in the UK under the Obscene Publications Act. One SAU activist also wrote for the infamous 1971 Schoolkids Oz magazine edition. By 1972 the SAU was under the leadership of Stephen Finch (a pupil at Rutherford Comprehensive School, Marylebone) and Simon Steyne (a 16 year old sixth former at Forest Hill Comprehensive School in south-east London), with Liza Dresner as national spokesperson. The actor Colin Welland met Dresner on the set of David Frost's chat show and subsequently made a donation to the SAU.

In 1972, there was media speculation that the SAU was funded by the Soviet Union and controlled by a hidden network of adult activists. Heath became concerned and authorised an MI5 investigation into the organisation. This failed to find any evidence of manipulation.

== 1972 strikes ==
The SAU organised a school strike on 9 May 1972. More than 1,000 pupils refused to attend school; assembled at Speakers' Corner and marched on County Hall – some sources claim up to 10,000 pupils were involved in the wider strike. Finch was unable to attend, being held in police custody after being arrested the week before. Scores of police officers were allocated to police the strike route. The protests was primarily against corporal punishment and school uniforms though Steyne also spoke of his support for the abolition of head teachers, which he likened to dictators. Some SAU documents stated that it would "smash dictatorship on the head". Home Secretary Reginald Maudling called the strike "the ultimate in absurd demonstration".

A second school strike took place on 17 May where 1,000 pupils, some as young as 11, assembled at Trafalgar Square and once again marched on County Hall. This time, however violence took place along the march and some 24 pupils were arrested, one 14-year-old girl was injured. Margaret Thatcher was Secretary of State for Education at the time and in June refused a proposal to issue official advice to local authorities on how to deal with the SAU. Many SAU members that left school to take part in these protests were punished by being expelled, excluded or with corporal punishment. It was later reported that the protests were subject to disruption. It is alleged that documents were stolen from the SAU offices by a newspaper, that the Inner London Education Authority sent letters to parents to discourage their children from attending the strike and that some head teachers locked pupils in school on strike days.

== Later campaigns and dissolution ==
Around 20 SAU members were given tickets to attend the performance of Alice Cooper's song School's Out on a July 1972 episode of Top of the Pops. This was condemned by media campaigner Mary Whitehouse for exposing millions of children to "violence and anarchy" in a manner that was "utterly irresponsible in a social climate which grows ever more violent". The SAU dissolved in 1974 after the leading members grew up and left school and were not replaced.

Despite its dissolution many of the original SAU and NUSS demands were eventually met, especially around corporal punishment. The Inner London Education Authority banned corporal punishment from 1974. National abolition was adopted as a policy by Labour in 1980 and was achieved in state schools in 1986. The SAU has been described as a significant factor in changing attitudes to corporal punishment in the UK and key to setting abolition on the political agenda. Other SAU aims remain unfulfilled: more than 90% of British secondary school pupils must wear a uniform. Single sex state schools still exist but have fallen in number from 2,500 in the 1960s to just 400 by 2011. Selective state schools were gradually closed from the 1960s in favour of comprehensive schools but received a reprieve from compulsory conversion in the 1980s and as of 2016 164 survive in England.
