= Strange Interlude (film) =

- Directed by: Robert Z. Leonard
- Written by: Bess Meredyth; C. Gardner Sullivan
- Based on: Strange Interlude; 1928 play by Eugene O'Neill
- Produced by: Robert Z. Leonard; Irving Thalberg
- Starring: Norma Shearer; Clark Gable
- Cinematography: Lee Garmes
- Edited by: Margaret Booth
- Production company: Metro-Goldwyn-Mayer
- Distributed by: Loew's Inc.
- Release date: July 15, 1932
- Running time: 109 minutes
- Country: United States
- Language: English
- Budget: $654,000
- Box office: $1.2 million

Strange Interlude is a 1932 American pre-Code drama film directed by Robert Z. Leonard and released by Metro-Goldwyn-Mayer. The film stars Norma Shearer and Clark Gable, and is based on the 1928 play Strange Interlude by Eugene O'Neill. It is greatly shortened from the play: the stage production lasts six hours and is sometimes performed over two evenings, while the film runs for two hours.

== Plot ==
World War I veteran Charlie Marsden returns from the war, hoping to see his secret crush Nina Leeds. He arrives to find her still at odds with her father, who stubbornly stood in the way of her dating Gordon who recently died in the war. Nina honors Gordon's memory by becoming a nurse in a war veteran's hospital. Feeling the loss of the one she loved, Nina dates many men. Upon the later death of her father, Nina returns with Dr. Ned Darrell and Gordon's old buddy Sam Evans. Nina eventually marries Sam, hoping to have the life she once wanted with Gordon. After the nuptials, Sam's mother tells her that insanity runs in the family and consequently Sam and Nina should not have children. Wanting to have a baby, Nina conceives a child by Ned, whom she secretly loves. Ned, on the other hand, deserts her and moves to Europe. When a son is born, he is named Gordon after Nina's first love. Charlie suspects who the father is; Nina and Ned vow to keep the secret of the identity of Gordon's biological father. Years pass, bringing age and frailty to the friends and one-time lovers, and death to Sam, after a happy life.

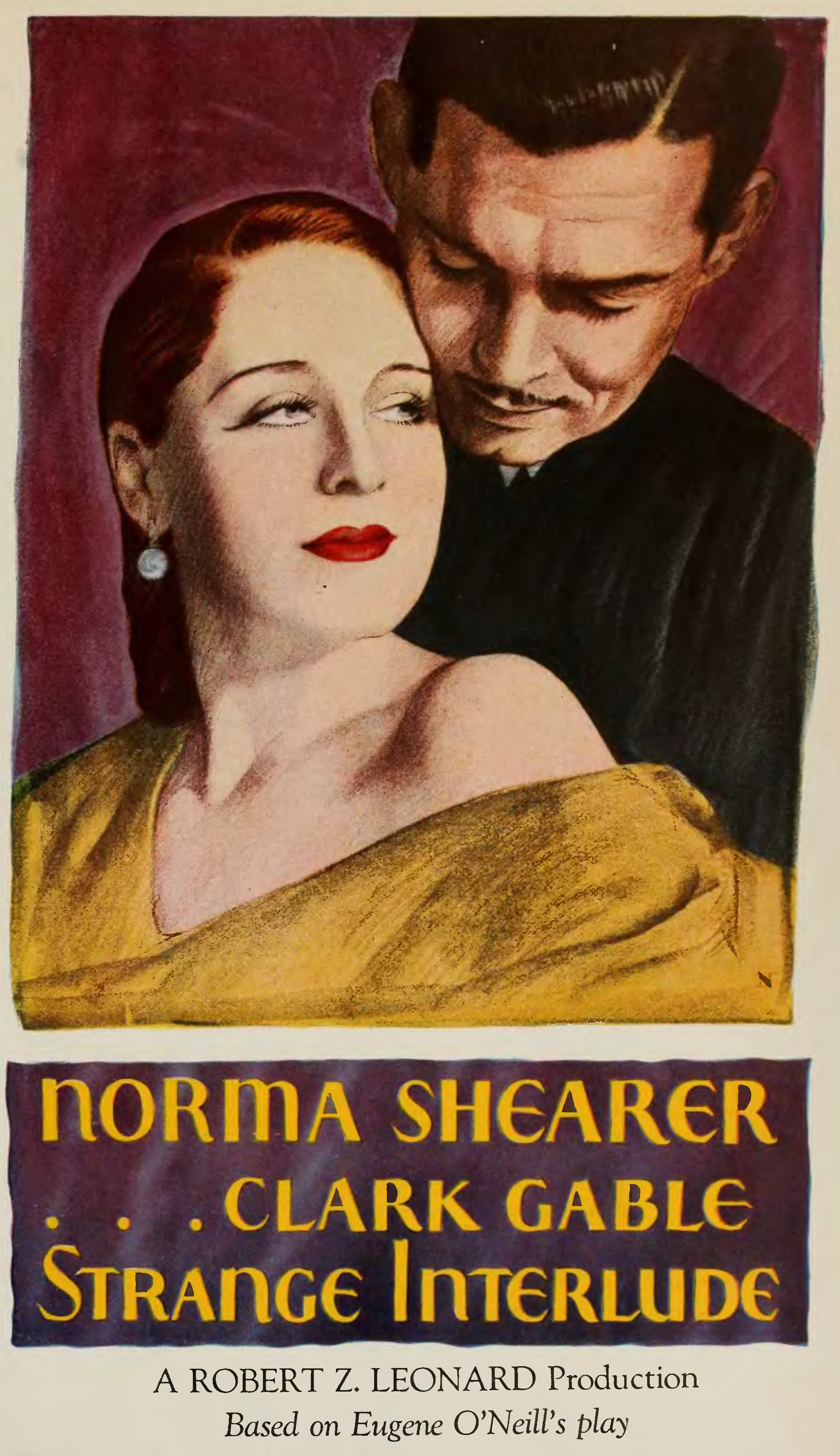
Strange Interlude ad from The Film Daily, 1932

After Gordonreaches adulthood, he announces his pending nuptials to Madeline Arnold. Sam dies, and after the funeral there is a confrontation between Gordon and Ned. Nina cries out that Gordon has struck his father. Gordon assumes she is speaking metaphorically and apologizes. He says that he has always known that his mother and Ned were in love, but that they denied their passion. He tells them that they must marry, now, with his blessing. Wordlessly, Nina prevents Ned from speaking the truth. Gordon leaves the room, and Nina and Ned agree that they will not marry, because despite his words, Gordon would be disappointed. They wave farewell to Gordon's plane as it carries the young people to a happy life. Nina is tottering from exhaustion, but Ned steps away, leaving her alone. Then Charlie appears, bearing an armful of wilting roses. Nina sits down, leans against him and rests her head on his shoulder, and he whispers “God bless dear old Charlie who, passed beyond desire, has all the luck at last.”

== Cast ==
- Norma Shearer as Nina Leeds
- Clark Gable as Dr. Ned Darrell
- Alexander Kirkland as Sam Evans
- Ralph Morgan as Charlie Marsden
- Robert Young as Gordon Evans (as a young man)
- May Robson as Mrs. Evans
- Maureen O'Sullivan as Madeline Arnold
- Henry B. Walthall as Professor Leeds
- Mary Alden as Mary (the Leeds' maid)
- Tad Alexander as Gordon Evans (as a child)

== Production notes ==
When MGM boss Irving Thalberg bought the movie rights to the play, he initially wanted Lynn Fontanne, who played Nina Leeds on Broadway, to play the lead, with her husband Alfred Lunt as Dr. Ned Darrell. However, they were not interested in making movies, so Thalberg decided to use his wife Norma Shearer and Clark Gable instead. At first Gable was intimidated by the story's material, but he gave it his best effort and subsequently received a very positive reaction from all who were involved.

== Box office ==
The film opened July 15, 1932 at Grauman's Chinese Theatre in Los Angeles and grossed $7,800 on its opening day and $15,000 in its opening weekend. According to MGM records, the film earned $957,000 in the US and Canada and $280,000 elsewhere, resulting in a profit of $600,000.
