= Irving Thalberg =

American film producer (1899–1936)

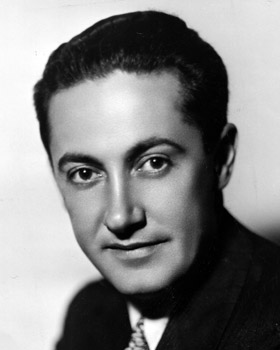
- Thalberg c. 1930s
- Born: Irving Grant Thalberg; May 30, 1899; New York City, U.S.
- Died: September 14, 1936 (aged 37); Santa Monica, California, U.S.
- Resting place: Forest Lawn Memorial Park, Glendale, California
- Occupations: Film producer; director; studio manager
- Years active: 1921–1936
- Spouse: Norma Shearer (m. 1927)
- Children: Irving Thalberg Jr. (1930–1987); Katharine Thalberg (1935–2006)
- Relatives: Sylvia Thalberg (sister)

Irving Grant Thalberg (May 30, 1899 – September 14, 1936) was an American film producer during the early years of motion pictures. He was called "The Boy Wonder" for his youth and ability to select scripts, choose actors, gather production staff, and make profitable films, including Grand Hotel, China Seas, A Night at the Opera, Mutiny on the Bounty, Camille, and The Good Earth. His films carved out an international market, "projecting a seductive image of American life brimming with vitality and rooted in democracy and personal freedom", states biographer Roland Flamini.

He was born in Brooklyn, New York City, and as a child was afflicted by a congenital heart disease that doctors said would kill him before he reached the age of thirty. After graduating from high school he worked as a store clerk during the day and to gain some job skills took a night class in typing. He then found work as a secretary with Universal Studios' New York office, and was later made studio manager for its Los Angeles facility. There, he oversaw production of a hundred films during his three years with the company. Among the films he produced was The Hunchback of Notre Dame (1923).

In Los Angeles, he partnered with Louis B. Mayer's new studio and, after it merged with two other studios, helped create Metro-Goldwyn-Mayer (MGM). He was made head of production of MGM in 1925, at the age of twenty-six, helping MGM become the most successful studio in Hollywood. During his twelve years with MGM, until his early death at the age of 37, he produced four hundred films, most of which bore his imprint and innovations, including story conferences with writers, sneak previews to gain early feedback, and extensive re-shooting of scenes to improve the film. In addition, he introduced horror films to audiences and coauthored the "Production Code", guidelines for morality followed by all studios. During the 1920s and 1930s, he synthesized and merged the world of stage drama and literary classics with Hollywood films.

Thalberg created numerous stars and groomed their screen images. Among them were Lon Chaney, Ramon Novarro, Greta Garbo, John Gilbert, Lionel Barrymore, Joan Crawford, Clark Gable, Jean Harlow, Wallace Beery, Spencer Tracy, Luise Rainer, and Norma Shearer, who became his wife. He had the ability to merge quality with commercial success, and was credited with bringing his artistic aspirations in line with the demand of audiences. After his death, Hollywood producers said he had been the world's "foremost figure in motion-picture history". President Franklin D. Roosevelt wrote, "The world of art is poorer with the passing of Irving Thalberg. His high ideals, insight and imagination went into the production of his masterpieces." The Irving G. Thalberg Memorial Award, given out periodically by the Academy of Motion Picture Arts and Sciences since 1937, is awarded to producers whose films reflect consistently high quality.

== Early years ==
Irving Grant Thalberg was born on May 30, 1899, in Brooklyn, New York to German Jewish immigrants, William and Henrietta (Haymann). Shortly after birth, he was diagnosed with "blue baby syndrome", caused by a congenital disease that limited the oxygen supply to his heart. The prognosis from the family's doctor and specialists was that he might live to the age of twenty, or at most, to thirty.

During his high school years in Brooklyn, he began having attacks of chest pains, dizziness and fatigue. This affected his ability to study, though until that time he was a good student. When he was 17 he contracted rheumatic fever, and was confined to bed for a year. His mother, in order to prevent him falling too far behind other students, brought him homework from school, books, and tutors to teach him at home. She also hoped that the schoolwork and reading would distract him from the "tantalizing sounds" of children playing outside his window.

With little to entertain him, he read books as a main activity. He devoured popular novels, classics, plays, and biographies. His books, of necessity, replaced the streets of New York, and led to his interest in classical philosophy and philosophers, such as William James. He later read the works of Upton Sinclair and Bernard Shaw, which converted him to socialism. In 1917, his mother (a Socialist Party activist herself), introduced him to mayoral candidate Morris Hillquit, who was impressed with the young Thalberg and hired him as a speechwriter. Besides writing them, Thalberg made his own soapbox speeches in Union Square on Hillquit's behalf, facing intimidation from Tammany Hall thugs as he did so. Although Hillquit put up a strong performance, he ultimately lost the election and Thalberg was jaded to politics in general and socialism in particular.

When Thalberg returned to school, he finished high school but lacked the stamina for college, which he felt would have required constant late-night studying and cramming for exams. Instead, he took part-time jobs as a store clerk, and in the evenings, to gain some job skills, taught himself typing, shorthand and Spanish at a night vocational school. When he turned 18, he placed an advertisement in the local newspaper hoping to find better work:

Situation Wanted: Secretary, stenographer, Spanish, English, high school education, no experience; $15.

== Career as producer ==
=== Universal Studios ===
He found work as an office secretary at Universal Pictures' New York office, and later became personal secretary to the studio's founder and president, Carl Laemmle. Among Thalberg's duties were transcribing and editing notes that Laemmle had written during screenings of his films. He earned $25 weekly, becoming adept at making insightful observations, which impressed Laemmle.

Laemmle took Thalberg to see his Los Angeles production facility, where he spent a month watching how movie production worked. Before returning to New York, Laemmle told Thalberg to remain and "keep an eye on things for me." Two months later, Laemmle returned to California, partly to see how well Thalberg was able to handle the responsibilities he had been given. Thalberg gave him suggestions, and thus impressed Laemmle by his ability to understand and explain problems.

Thalberg suggested, "The first thing you should do is establish a new job of studio manager and give him the responsibility of watching day-to-day operations." Laemmle immediately agreed: "All right. You're it." In shock, Thalberg replied, "I'm what?" Laemmle told him to take charge of the Los Angeles studio, which he did in early 1919. When aged 20, Thalberg became responsible for immediately overseeing the nine ongoing film productions and nearly thirty scenarios then under development.

In describing the rationale for this early appointment as studio manager, film historian David Thomson writes that his new job "owed nothing to nepotism, private wealth, or experience in the film industry." He reasons that despite "Thalberg's youth, modest education, and frail appearance ... it is clear that he had the charm, insight, and ability, or the appearance of it, to captivate the film world."

Thalberg was one among the majority of Hollywood film industry workers who migrated from the East Coast, primarily from New York. Some film actors, such as Conrad Nagel, did not like the five-day train trip or the sudden warmth of the California climate. Neither did Marion Davies, who was not used to such "big wide spaces". Samuel Marx, a close friend of Thalberg's from New York, recalled how easily Thalberg adapted to Southern California, often standing outside his doorway during moments of contemplation to enjoy the scenery. "We were all young", said comedian Buster Keaton. "The air in California was like wine. Our business was also young—and growing like nothing ever seen before."

==== Confrontation with Erich von Stroheim ====
He quickly established his tenacity as he battled with well-known director Erich von Stroheim over the length of Foolish Wives (1922). Biographer Roland Flamini notes that the film was Universal's most expensive "jewel" ever in production, and its director and star, von Stroheim, was taking the film far over budget. Thalberg, now Universal's general manager, was forced to have the director quickly finalize production before the studio's working capital was used up. Flamini describes the situation:

The cost of that set alone had staggered Thalberg when he learned of it, but it was von Stroheim's obsessive spending on unnecessary detail that finally led to Thalberg's confrontation with the formidable director.

Thalberg had von Stroheim come to his office, which he did still wearing his film costume as a Russian Imperial Guard and escorted by members of his production team. Thalberg calmly told him, "I have seen all the film and you have all you need for the picture. I want you to stop shooting", to which von Stroheim replied, "But I have not finished as yet." "Yes, you have", said Thalberg. "You have spent all the money this company can afford. I cannot allow you to spend any more."

Thalberg quietly explained that the director worked under the producer, and it was his responsibility to control costs. Von Stroheim, surrounded by his assistants, then confronted Thalberg: "If you were not my superior, I would smash you in the face." Thalberg, unflinching, said "Don't let that stop you." The result was that Thalberg soon afterward removed the cameras from von Stroheim's studio and took over editing. The uncut footage was pared down from five-and-a-half hours to three hours, to von Stroheim's deep dissatisfaction.

A similar problem developed with von Stroheim's next film, Merry-Go-Round (1923). Although he had promised Thalberg to remain within budget this time, he continued production until it went to twice the agreed length and was not yet near completion. Flamini speculates why this happened:

Given his earlier problems with Thalberg, the director's behavior seemed suicidal. It's possible, however, that the idea of dismissal was simply unthinkable to him or that that he felt he could go over Thalberg's head to Laemmle, and the studio boss would surely want to keep his most prestigious director happy.

Thalberg again called von Stroheim to his office, handed him a long letter written and signed by himself, describing the problems, and summarily fired von Stroheim as of that moment. Thalberg's letter stated among the reasons,

totally inexcusable and repeated acts of insubordination ... extravagant ideas which you have been unwilling to sacrifice ... unnecessary delays ... and your apparent idea that you are greater and more powerful than the organization that employs you.

His dismissal of von Stroheim was considered an "earthquake in movie circles", notes Flamini. Producer David O. Selznick said that "it was the first time a director had been fired. It took great guts and courage ... Von Stroheim was utterly indifferent over money and could have gone on and spent millions, with nobody to stop him". The opinion was shared by director Rouben Mamoulian, who said that the "little fellow at Universal", in one bold stroke, had "asserted the primacy of the studio over the director" and forever altered the balance of power in the movie industry.

==== Effects of his young age ====
According to Flamini, his youth was a subject of conversation within the movie community. Executives from other studios, actors, and film crew, often mistook him to be a junior employee. Movie columnist Louella Parsons, upon first being introduced to him, asked, "What's the joke? Where's the new general manager?" After five minutes of talking to Thalberg, however, she later wrote about "Universal's Boy Wonder": "He might be a boy in looks and age, but it was no child's mind that was being asked to cope with the intricate politics of Universal City." Novelist Edna Ferber responded the same way, writing that "I had fancied motion-picture producers as large gentlemen smoking oversized cigars. But this young man whose word seemed so final at Universal City ... impressed me deeply."

The male actors in the studio had a similar reaction. Lionel Barrymore, who was nearly twice his age, recalled their meetings:

I used to go into his office with the feeling I was addressing a boy. In a moment, I would be the one who felt young and inexperienced. I would feel he was not one, but all the forty disciples.

Thalberg likewise gained the respect of leading playwrights, some of whom also looked down on him due to his youth. George S. Kaufman, co-author of Dinner at Eight, several Marx Brothers films, and two George Gershwin plays, came from New York to meet with Thalberg. Afterward he confided to his friend, Groucho Marx: "That man has never written a word, yet he can tell me exactly what to do with a story. I didn't know you had people like that out here."

Actress Norma Shearer, whom he later married, was surprised after he greeted her at the door, then walked her to his office for her first job interview: "Then you're not the office boy?" she asked. He smiled, as he sat himself behind his desk: "No, Miss Shearer, I'm Irving Thalberg, vice-president of the Mayer Company. I'm the man who sent for you."

His younger-than-normal age for a studio executive was usually mentioned even after he left Universal to help start up MGM. Screenwriter Agnes Christine Johnson, who worked with Thalberg for years, described his contribution during meetings:

He's so marvelous that no one who doesn't know him can believe it. Seeing him sitting in with all the important people, looking such a boy, and deferred to by everybody, you'd think that either they were crazy or you were. But if you stayed and listened, you'd understand. He has a mind like a whip. Snap! He has an idea—the right idea—the only idea!

The same quality was observed by director and screenwriter Hobart Henley: "If something that read well in conference turns out not so good on the screen, I go to him and, like that [Henley snaps his fingers] he has a remedy. He's brilliant." Another assistant producer to Thalberg explains:

Irving had a sixth sense about a manuscript. He was a film doctor. You could go out [to a preview] with a film, and if there was something that didn't quite come off, he could put his finger on it. Some of the great films that came out of Metro were remade at his suggestion. He had that uncanny ability.

His youth also contributed to his open-mindedness to the ideas of others. Conrad Nagel, who starred in numerous Thalberg films, reported that Thalberg was generally empathetic to those he worked alongside: "Thalberg never raised his voice. He just looked into your eyes, spoke softly, and after a few minutes he cast a spell on you." Studio attorney Edwin Loeb, who also worked to create AMPAS, explained that "the real foundation of Irving's success was his ability to look at life through the eyes of any given person. He had a gift of empathy, and almost complete perspective." Those opinions were also shared by producer Walter Wanger: "You thought that you were talking to an Indian savant. He could cast a spell on anybody."

His talent as a producer was enhanced by his "near-miraculous" powers of concentration, notes film critic J. Hoberman. As a result, he was never bored or tired, and supplemented his spare time with reading for his own amusement, recalls screenwriter Bayard Veiller, with some of his favorite authors being Francis Bacon, Epictetus, and Immanuel Kant.

==== Film projects at Universal ====
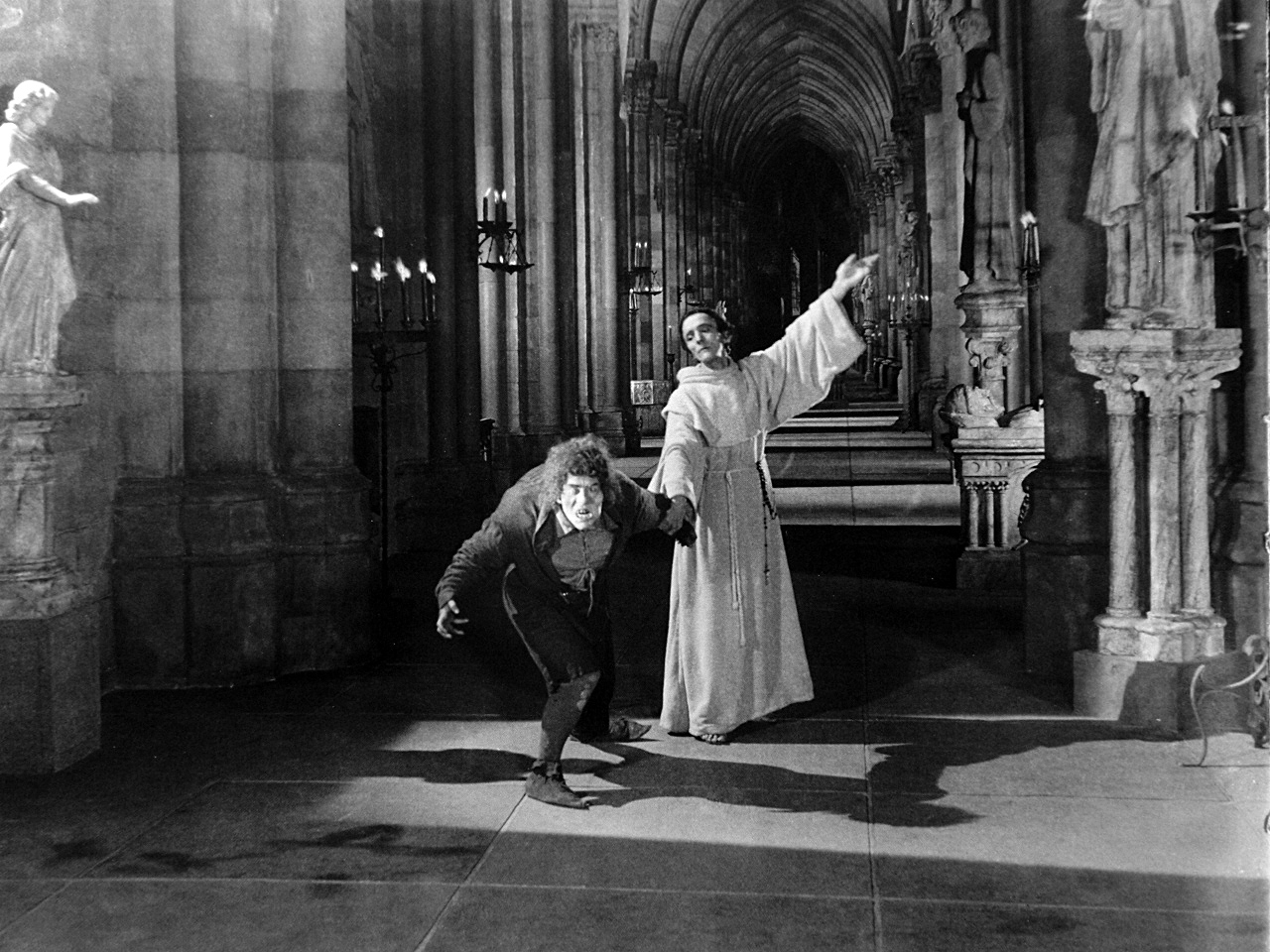
Lon Chaney in The Hunchback of Notre Dame (1923)

Biographer Bob Thomas writes that after three years at the studio, Thalberg continually proved his value. Universal's pictures improved noticeably, primarily due to Thalberg's "uncanny sense of story." He took tight control over many key aspects of production, including his requirement that from then on scripts were tightly constructed before filming began, rather than during production. Thomas adds that he also "showed a remarkable capacity for working with actors, casting them aptly and advising them on their careers."

After producing two films that were in production when he began work at Universal, he presented Laemmle with his idea for a film based on one of his favorite classic stories, The Hunchback of Notre Dame. Rather than just a horror picture, Thalberg suggested turning it into a spectacle which would include a replica of the Notre Dame Cathedral in Paris. He had Lon Chaney play the hunchback. The film became Universal's most profitable silent film and established Chaney's career as a top-flight star.

After nearly three years with Universal, Thalberg had supervised more than a hundred movies, reorganized the studio to give more control to the managers, and had "stopped the defection" of many of their leading stars by offering them better, higher-paying contracts. He also produced a number of Universal's prestige films, which made the company profitable. However, he decided it was time to find a studio in Los Angeles more suitable to his skills, and spread word that he was available.

=== Metro-Goldwyn-Mayer (MGM) ===
Thalberg (left) with wife Norma Shearer, and Louis B. Mayer, 1932

Cecil B. DeMille was the first who wanted to hire him, telling his partner Jesse Lasky, "The boy is a genius. I can see it. I know it." Lasky opposed the hire, stating, "Geniuses we have all we need." Thalberg then received an offer from Hal Roach, but the offer was withdrawn because Thalberg lacked experience with slapstick comedy films. In late 1922, Thalberg was introduced to Louis B. Mayer, president of a small but dynamic and fast-growing studio. At that first meeting, Thalberg "made a deep, immediate impression on Mayer", writes Flamini. After Thalberg had left, Mayer said to studio attorney Edwin Loeb: "Tell him if he comes to work for me, I'll look after him as though he were my son."

Although their personalities were in many ways opposite, Mayer being more outspoken and nearly twice the younger man's age, Thalberg was hired as vice president in charge of production at Louis B. Mayer Productions. Years later, Mayer's daughter Irene Mayer Selznick recalled that "it was hard to believe anyone that boyish could be so important." According to Flamini, Thalberg was hired because, although Mayer was an astute businessman, "what he lacked was Thalberg's almost unerring ability to combine quality with commercial success, to bring artistic aspiration in line with the demands of the box office." Mayer's company subsequently merged with two others to become Metro-Goldwyn-Mayer (MGM), with the 24-year-old Thalberg made part-owner and accorded the same position as vice president in charge of production. Three years after the merger, MGM became the most successful studio in Hollywood.

During his twelve years at MGM, Thalberg supervised the production of more than four hundred films. Although Thalberg and his colleagues at MGM knew he was "doomed" to not live much past the age of 30 due to heart disease, he loved producing films. He continued developing innovative ideas and overseeing most of MGM's pictures. Under Thalberg's management, MGM released over 40% more films yearly than Warner Brothers, and more than double Paramount's releases. From 1924 until 1936, when Thalberg died at the age of 37, "almost every film bore Thalberg's imprint", wrote Mark Vieira.

In the 1934 California gubernatorial election Democrat Upton Sinclair ran against Republican Frank Merriam, the latter of whom MGM supported. Thalberg was to lead MGM's anti-Sinclair campaign and the studio recruited Carey Wilson to create a series of anti-Sinclair propaganda films. These films, directed by Felix E. Feist, included fake newsreels of Sinclair supporters who were portrayed as bums and criminals. They were shown in Californian movie theaters, with one episode featuring hired actors as Sinclair supporters speaking with foreign accents. Supposedly when one actor objected to the films Thalberg replied "Nothing is unfair in politics". This was depicted in the 2020 David Fincher film Mank, with Thalberg being portrayed by Ferdinand Kingsley.

==== Production innovations ====
Sid Grauman, Norma Shearer, and Thalberg, 1932

Thalberg's production techniques "broke new ground in filmmaking", adds Vieira. Among his contributions at MGM was his innovation of story conferences, sneak previews and scene retakes. He introduced the first horror films and coauthored the Production Code, the set of moral guidelines that all film studios agreed to follow. Thalberg helped synthesize and merge the world of stage drama and literary classics with Hollywood films.

MGM thereby became the only movie studio to consistently show a profit during the Great Depression. Flamini explains that the equation for MGM's success depended on combining stars, a Broadway hit or popular classic, and high standards of production. This combination at the time was considered a "revolutionary approach" in the film industry, which until then assumed a star was all that was needed for success, regardless of the story or production quality. The other studios began following MGM's lead with that same formula.

==== Production techniques ====
Thalberg generally followed a system in managing his productions. According to one of his assistants, Lawrence Weingarten, who later became a producer, "Thalberg directed the film on paper, and then the director directed the film on film."

Thalberg was generally opposed to location shooting overseas where he could not oversee production and control costs, as happened with Ben Hur. Thus, he kept hundreds of back-lot carpenters at work creating realistic sets, as he did for fifteenth-century Romeo and Juliet (1936), or with China Seas (1935), to replicate the harbors of Hong Kong.

Vieira points out that Thalberg's "fascination with Broadway plays" often had him create and present stories visually. For China Seas, for instance, he described for the screenwriters, director and others, exactly how he wanted the film to appear on screen:

I'd like to open this sequence on a roaring gale at sea. ... I think it might be better to open just prior to the storm—that awful calm before the storm ... and the typhoon hits and they go through all that hell, and the terrific tiredness after the fight is over—the weariness of Gaskell [Clark Gable], and from behind him this China woman comes and their affair [begins].

To be certain of achieving the desired effects, Thalberg made sure his cinematographers were careful in their use of light and shadow. Vieira observes that "more than any other producer or any other studio, Thalberg and MGM manipulated lenses, filters, and lighting instruments to affect the viewer." As a result, he notes, "most of Thalberg's films contain moments such as these, in which cinematic technique transcends mere exposition and gives the viewer something to treasure."

Thalberg was supported by most of the studio in these kinds of creative decisions. "It was a big family," notes Weingarten. "If we had a success, everybody—and I mean every cutter, every painter, every plasterer—was excited about it, was abuzz, was in a tizzy about the whole idea of picture making."

==== Taking risks with new subjects and stars ====
"A temperate man in all his ways of living, in this one respect he was an inveterate gambler. If he believed in a man, or a project, or a story, he would stake everything on his conviction. ... Everyone who worked for Thalberg loved him. He had the quality, rare among showmen, and precious among men, of standing back after an achievement and letting the other fellow take the credit ... he never wanted to be known as the big promoter. He just saw a little farther than most of the others, and trusted his vision, and worked like a laborer until it came true. ... What he also had was a great kindliness, a love for his work, workers, friends and audiences."

— C. A. Lejeune, film critic of the London Observer

In 1929, MGM released fifty films, and all but five showed a profit. Of those that failed, Hallelujah was also a gamble by Thalberg. When King Vidor, the film's producer and director, proposed the idea to Thalberg of a major film cast, for the first time, exclusively with African Americans, he told Thalberg directly, "I doubt that it will make a dollar at the box office." Thalberg replied, "Don't worry about that. I've told you that MGM can afford an occasional experiment."

By the early 1930s, a number of stars began failing at the box office, partly due to the Great Depression that was now undermining the economy, along with the public's ability to spend on entertainment. Thalberg began using two stars in a film, rather than one, as had been the tradition at all the studios, such as pairing Greta Garbo with John Gilbert, Clark Gable with Jean Harlow, and William Powell with Myrna Loy. After experimenting with a few such films, including Mata Hari (1931), which were profitable, he decided on a multi-star production of another Broadway play, Grand Hotel (1932). It had five major stars, including Garbo, Joan Crawford, John Barrymore, Lionel Barrymore, and Wallace Beery. "Before Thalberg," writes Vieira, "there was no Grand Hotel in the American consciousness." The film won the Oscar for Best Picture in 1932.

Thalberg went against consensus and took another risk with The Great Ziegfeld (1936), costarring Luise Rainer. Although Louis B. Mayer did not want her in the role, which he felt was too minor for a new star, Thalberg felt that "only she could play the part", wrote biographer Charles Higham. Shortly after shooting began in late 1935, doubts of Rainer's acting ability emerged in the press. However, despite her limited appearances in the film, Rainer "so impressed audiences with one highly emotional scene" that she won the Academy Award for Best Actress.

After her winning role in The Great Ziegfeld, Thalberg wanted her to play a role that was the opposite of her previous character, for The Good Earth (1937). For the part as a Chinese peasant, she was required to act totally subservient to her husband, being perpetually huddled in submission, and barely spoke a word of dialogue during the entire film. Rainer recalls that Mayer did not approve of the film being produced or her part in it: "He was horrified at Irving Thalberg's insistence for me to play O-lan, the poor uncomely little Chinese peasant." However, she again won the Oscar for Best Actress, becoming the first actress to win two consecutive Oscars, a feat not matched until Katharine Hepburn's two Oscar wins thirty years later.

==== Grooming new stars ====
Besides bringing a distinctive high quality "look" to MGM films and often recreating well-known stories or plays, Thalberg's actors themselves took on a characteristic quality. Thalberg wanted his female actors to appear "cool, classy and beautiful," notes Flamini. And he strove to make the male actors appear "worldly and in control." In general, Thalberg movies and actors came to be "luxurious," "glossy," and "technically flawless." By doing so, he made stars or boosted the careers of actors such as Lon Chaney, Ramon Novarro, John Gilbert, Greta Garbo, Joan Crawford, Clark Gable, Helen Hayes, Jean Harlow, Marie Dressler, Wallace Beery, John Barrymore, Lionel Barrymore and Luise Rainer.

==== Greta Garbo ====
In 1925, a young Greta Garbo, then twenty, and unable to speak any English, was brought over from Sweden at Mayer's request, as he saw how she looked in still photos. A Swedish friend thought he would help her by contacting Thalberg, who then agreed to give her a screen test. According to author Frederick Sands, "the result of the test was electrifying." Thalberg was impressed and began grooming the new starlet the following day: "the studio arranged to fix her teeth, made sure she lost weight, and gave her an English tutor."

==== Joan Crawford ====
Joan Crawford's first role was a Thalberg production at MGM and she became one of their leading stars for the next thirty years. Crawford was somewhat jealous of Norma Shearer as she thought she was given the better material by her husband Thalberg out of nepotism. Nevertheless, she felt that his contribution to MGM was vital to the film industry. Not long after his early death, she recalls her concerns: "Thalberg was dead and the concept of the quality 'big' picture pretty much went out the window."

==== Marie Dressler ====
Thalberg also realized that old stars few had heard of could be made into new ones. Marie Dressler, a fifty-nine-year-old early vaudeville and movie star, who had played the top-billed lead, above Charles Chaplin and Mabel Normand), in the first feature-length comedy, Tillie's Punctured Romance (1914), was unable to get any roles in films after leaving show business for some years, finally working as a maid. MGM screenwriter Frances Marion suggested to Thalberg that she might fit well in a starring role for a new film, and was surprised that he knew of her prior successes. Thalberg approved of using her without a screen test and offered his rationale:

My theory is that anybody who once hits the bull's-eye—it doesn't matter in what profession—has the brains and stamina to stage a comeback. So I figure that a woman who held the spotlight for so many years has been the victim of bad writing—and probably a lot of bad advice.

By 1932, shortly before she died, Dressler was the country's number one box office star.

==== Wallace Beery ====
Marie Dressler was paired twice, in Min and Bill (1930) and Tugboat Annie (1933), with Wallace Beery, another major silent star who had been struggling to get work in sound pictures until Thalberg cast him. Beery had enjoyed a hugely successful silent film career dating back to 1913, but had been fired by Paramount shortly after sound pictures appeared. Thalberg cast him in the role of "Machine Gun Butch," which had been meant for recently deceased Lon Chaney, in The Big House (1930), an energetic prison picture that became a huge hit. Beery was nominated for an Academy Award for Best Actor for his performance, and his burgeoning career at MGM had transformed him into the studio's highest paid actor within two more years, during which time he won the Oscar for The Champ and had become a phenomenal box office draw as a result of Thalberg's foresight.

==== Getting audience feedback and reshooting ====
According to Vieira, MGM had few failures during this period, and numerous blockbusters. Among the reasons was Thalberg's unique system of developing a script during story conferences with writers before filming began, and later giving "sneak previews" followed by audience feedback through written questionnaires. Often, where he felt improvement was needed, he arranged for scenes to be reshot. As Thalberg once stated, "The difference between something good and something superior is often very small."

==== Bad decisions and missed opportunities ====
Thalberg felt he had his "finger on the pulse of America. I know what people will do and what they won't do," he said. His judgment was not always accurate, however. Thalberg's bringing Broadway productions to the screen to develop higher picture standards sometimes resulted in "studied" acting or "stagey" sets, notes Flamini. In 1927, after the successful release of the first full-length talking picture, The Jazz Singer (1927), he nevertheless felt that talking pictures were a fad. Thalberg likewise did not think that color would replace black-and-white in movies.

When an assistant protested against a script that envisioned a love scene in Paris with an ocean background, Thalberg refused to make changes, saying "We can't cater to a handful of people who know Paris." A more serious distraction to Thalberg's efforts was his obsession with making his wife Norma Shearer a prominent star, efforts which sometimes led to "overblown and overglamorous" productions. Thalberg himself admitted to his obsession years later when he told a fellow producer: "You're behaving like I did with Norma. I knew positively that she could play anything. It's a kind of romantic astigmatism that attacks producers when they fall for an actress."

==== Important films at MGM ====
===== Ben Hur (1925) =====
Scene from Ben-Hur: A Tale of the Christ (1925)

One of the first pictures he took charge of, Ben-Hur: A Tale of the Christ, was inherited and already in production by another studio when MGM was formed. The film was turning into a disastrous expense with cost overruns already in the millions due to its lavish sets and location shooting in Rome. Most studio executives chose to terminate the film to cut their losses. Thalberg, however, felt differently, and thought the film would affect movie audiences, due to its classic literary source, and would highlight MGM as a major new studio.

He therefore discarded much of the original footage shot in Italy and recreated the set on MGM's back lots in Culver City, which added more millions to the production, yet gave him more control over production. The new set also included a replica of Circus Maximus for the dramatic chariot race scenes. Flamini notes that Thalberg's "gamble paid off," drawing international attention to MGM, and to Thalberg within the movie industry for his bold action.

===== Mutiny on the Bounty (1935) =====
Mutiny on the Bounty was the studio's next most expensive film after Ben Hur, with some now calling it "Thalberg's masterpiece." He initially had difficulty convincing Mayer that he could make the film without making heroes of the mutineers. He achieved that by instead making a hero of the British Royal Navy, whereby the officers and shipmates would from then on display their mutual respect. Thalberg also had to convince Clark Gable to accept the role against his will. He pleaded with Gable, eventually promising him that "If it isn't one of your greatest successes, I'll never ask you again to play a part you don't want." The film's other main stars were Charles Laughton and Franchot Tone. The film was nominated for six Academy Awards, including Best Actor, and winning it for Best Picture. Thalberg accepted the award as producer from Frank Capra.

==== Thalberg and Mayer partnership ====
At first, Thalberg and studio chief Louis B. Mayer got along splendidly; however, they had different production philosophies. Thalberg preferred literary works, while Mayer preferred glitzy crowd-pleasing films. A clash was inevitable, and their relationship grew decidedly frosty. When Thalberg fell ill in the final weeks of 1932, Mayer took advantage of the situation and replaced him with David O. Selznick and Walter Wanger. Thalberg's reputation by that time for working long hours was widely known, and rumors about the related strain on his fragile health had become front-page news in entertainment trade publications. The Hollywood Reporter in January 1933 updated its readership about his condition and addressed growing concerns that he might be forced, despite his young age, to quit the business:

In an effort to quiet rumors zooming throughout the industry, indicating that Irving Thalberg would be compelled to retire permanently as production head of Metro-Goldwyn-Mayer and take a long rest, a reporter from this publication got in touch with his physician yesterday for a statement as to the real condition of Mr. Thalberg. Dr. Philip Newmark stated:

Mr. Thalberg had a heavy attack of influenza that lasted several days and, although he was quite ill, he recovered nicely. However, he is far from being in good condition, he is all tired out and needs rest. I want him to take a rest for several weeks. I do not consider it necessary, at this time, to send him away, as he is quite comfortable at home.

Asked about the report that Thalberg had suffered a violent heart attack, Dr. Newmark replied: "Mr. Thalberg's heart has not been any too strong and that is another reason why I have insisted that he take a long rest.

Once Thalberg recovered sufficiently from his bout with the "flu" and was able to return to work later in 1933, it was as one of MGM's unit producers, albeit one who had first choice on projects as well as preferential access to all the studio's resources, including over casting its stars. Thalberg's good relationship with Nicholas Schenck, then president of Loew's Incorporated, proved to be an ongoing advantage for him. Loew's was the corporate parent of MGM, so Schenck was the true power and ultimate arbiter at the studio; and he usually supported Thalberg's decisions and continued to do so whenever disagreements about projects or production needs arose. As a result, Thalberg also continued to produce or coproduce some of MGM's most prestigious and critically acclaimed ventures in this period, such as The Barretts of Wimpole Street (1934) starring his wife Norma Shearer, China Seas (1935), A Night at the Opera (1935), San Francisco (1936), and Romeo and Juliet (1936).

== Personal life ==
During his few years with Universal while living in New York, Thalberg had become romantically involved with Carl Laemmle's daughter, Rosabelle. Still in his early twenties and later spending most of his time in Los Angeles, his feelings toward her were no longer as strong. Flamini suspects that this may have affected his position at Universal and partly caused his decision to leave the company. "The Laemmles prayed that Irving would marry Rosabelle", notes Flamini. "They wanted their sons to be educated and their daughters to marry nice Jewish boys."

With his wife, actress Norma Shearer, July 1936

Less than a year after he and Mayer took charge of the newly created MGM studios, and still only twenty-five years old, Thalberg suffered a serious heart attack due to overwork. Mayer also became aware of Thalberg's congenital heart problems and now worried about the prospect of running MGM without him. Mayer also became concerned that one of his daughters might become romantically involved, and told them so:

He's attractive. I don't want you girls getting any ideas in your heads, ever. ... I don't want to have a young widow on my hands.

Thalberg, aware of Mayer's feelings, made it a point of never giving too much attention to his daughters at social events.

One of Thalberg's traits was his ability to work long hours into the night with little sign of fatigue. According to Vieira, Thalberg believed that as long as his mind was active in his work and he was not bored, he would not feel tired. Thalberg, who often got by with only five hours of sleep, felt that most people could get by with less than they realized. To keep his mental faculties at peak, he would read philosophical books by Bacon, Epictetus, or Kant. "They stimulate me. I'd drop out of sight in no time if I didn't read and keep up with current thought—and the philosophers are brain sharpeners."

During the early 1930s, Thalberg was ambivalent about political events in Europe. While he feared Nazism and the rise of Hitler, he also feared Communism. At the time, notes Vieira, "given a choice between communism and fascism, many Americans—including Thalberg—would prefer the latter." Thalberg stated his opinion:

When a dictator dies, his system dies, too. But if communism is allowed to spread, it will be harder to root out. What is at stake is our whole way of life, our freedom. They will have vanished forever.

When others suggested that many Jews could die in Germany as a result of Nazi anti-Semitism, he replied that in his opinion "Hitler and Hitlerism will pass." On one occasion, Catholic Prince Löwenstein of Germany, who himself had almost been captured before fleeing Germany, told him: "Mr. Thalberg, your own people are being systematically hunted down and rooted out of Germany." Thalberg suggested that world Jewry should nevertheless not interfere, that the Jewish race would survive Hitler. Within a few years, American film distribution was "choked off" in Germany. Led by Warner Brothers, all American studios eventually closed their German offices.

Thalberg's wedding in 1927 to Norma Shearer, with his parents and her mother shown

Thalberg began dating actress Norma Shearer a few years after he joined MGM. Following her conversion to Judaism, they married on Thursday, September 29, 1927, in a private ceremony in the garden of his rented house in Beverly Hills. Rabbi Edgar F. Magnin officiated at the event, with Shearer's brother Douglas Shearer giving the bride away, and Louis B. Mayer serving as best man. The couple drove to Monterey for their honeymoon and then moved into their newly constructed home in Beverly Hills.

After their second child was born, Shearer considered retiring from films, but Thalberg convinced her to continue acting, saying he could find her good roles. She went on to be one of MGM's biggest stars of the 1930s. Their two children were Irving Jr. (1930–1987) and Katharine (1935–2006).

== Death ==
Thalberg and Shearer took a Labor Day weekend vacation in Monterey, California, in 1936 (Labor Day fell on September 7 that year), staying at the same beachfront hotel where they had spent their honeymoon. A few weeks earlier, Thalberg's leading screenwriter, Albert Lewin, had proposed doing a film based on a soon-to-be published book, Gone with the Wind. Although Thalberg said it would be a "sensational" role for Gable, and a "terrific picture," he decided not to do it:

Look, I have just made Mutiny on the Bounty and The Good Earth. And now you're asking me to burn Atlanta? No! Absolutely not! No more epics for me now. Just give me a little drawing-room drama. I'm tired. I'm just too tired.

Besides, Thalberg told Mayer, "[n]o Civil War picture ever made a nickel". Shortly after returning from Monterey, Thalberg was diagnosed with pneumonia while on the set of A Day at the Races. His condition worsened steadily, and he eventually required an oxygen tent at home. He died on September 14, at the age of 37.

Sam Wood, while directing A Day at the Races, was given the news by phone. He returned to the set with tears in his eyes and told the others. As the news spread, "the studio was paralyzed with shock", notes Thomas. "Work stopped and hundreds of people wept", with stars, writers, directors, and studio employees "all sharing a sense of loss at the death of a man who had been a part of their working lives", states Flamini.

His funeral took place two days later, and when the services began the other studios throughout Hollywood observed five minutes of silence. Producer Sam Goldwyn "wept uncontrollably for two days" and was unable to regain his composure enough to attend. The MGM studio closed for that day.

The passing of Irving Thalberg is the greatest conceivable loss to the motion-picture industry, and I say that absolutely without qualification. There are hundreds of executives but only about six men with the genuine genius for making motion pictures and Mr. Thalberg was the greatest of those. I have long considered him the most competent and inspired producer in the business.

— director and producer Cecil B. DeMille

Services were held at the Wilshire Boulevard Temple that Thalberg had occasionally attended. The funeral attracted thousands of spectators who came to view the arrival of countless stars from MGM and other studios, including Greta Garbo, the Marx Brothers, Charlie Chaplin, Walt Disney, Howard Hughes, Al Jolson, Gary Cooper, Carole Lombard, Mary Pickford, and Douglas Fairbanks, among the screen luminaries. The ushers who led them to their seats included Clark Gable, Fredric March, and playwright Moss Hart. Erich von Stroheim, who had been fired by Thalberg, came to pay his respects. Producers Louis B. Mayer, the Warner brothers, Adolph Zukor, and Nicholas Schenck sat together solemnly as Rabbi Magnin gave the eulogy.

Thalberg is buried in a private marble tomb in the Great Mausoleum at Forest Lawn Memorial Park in Glendale, California, lying at rest beside his wife, Norma Shearer Thalberg Arrouge (Thalberg's crypt was engraved "My Sweetheart Forever" by Shearer).

Over the following days, tributes were published by the national press. Louis B. Mayer, his co-founding partner at Metro-Goldwyn-Mayer, said he had lost "the finest friend a man could ever have", while MGM president Nicholas Schenck stated that "Thalberg was the most important man in the production end of the motion-picture industry." Leading producers from the other studios also expressed their feelings in published tributes to Thalberg:

David O. Selznick described him as "beyond any question the greatest individual force for fine pictures." Samuel Goldwyn called him "the foremost figure in the motion-picture industry ... and an inspiration." M. H. Aylesworth, Chairman of RKO, wrote that "his integrity, vision and ability made him the spearhead of all motion-picture production throughout the world." Harry Warner, president of Warner Bros., described him as "gifted with one of the finest minds ever placed at the service of motion-picture production." Sidney R. Kent, president of Twentieth Century Fox, said that "he made the whole world richer by giving it the highest type of entertainment. He was a true genius." Columbia president Harry Cohn said the "motion picture industry has suffered a loss from which it will not soon recover...". Darryl F. Zanuck noted, "More than any other man he raised the industry to its present world prestige." Adolph Zukor, chairman of Paramount, stated, "Irving Thalberg was the most brilliant young man in the motion picture business." Jesse Lasky said, "It will be utterly impossible to replace him."

Among the condolences that came from world political leaders, President Franklin D. Roosevelt wrote, "The world of art is poorer with the passing of Irving Thalberg. His high ideals, insight and imagination went into the production of his masterpieces."

Among the pictures that were unfinished or not yet released at the time of his death were A Day at the Races, The Good Earth, Camille, Maytime, and Romeo and Juliet. Groucho Marx, star of A Day at the Races, wrote, "After Thalberg's death, my interest in the movies waned. I continued to appear in them, but ... The fun had gone out of picture making." Thalberg's widow, Norma Shearer, recalled, "Grief does very strange things to you. I didn't seem to feel the shock for two weeks afterwards. ... then, at the end of those two weeks, I collapsed."

== Legacy in the movie industry ==
One of the greatest friends a man could have; one of the greatest creative minds the world has ever produced; the greatest leader our industry has ever had. No words can express either my own personal grief, nor the grief that I know all of us who owe so much to him can express.
I can think of no one in our industry who does not owe Irving Thalberg a deep debt of gratitude. I can think of no one in the world to whom his passing is not a loss.

— actor Lionel Barrymore

Thalberg's legacy to the movie industry is "incalculable", states biographer Bob Thomas. He notes that with his numerous production innovations and grand stories, often turning classic literature and Broadway stage productions into big-screen pictures, he managed to keep "American movies supreme throughout the world for a generation". Darryl F. Zanuck, founder of 20th Century-Fox said that during Thalberg's brief career, he had become the "most creative producer in the history of films". Thomas describes some of his contributions:

The touchstone of his genius was quality, the unceasing pursuit of quality. He ventured into uncharted land in his search for improved film entertainment, and his attainments became the goals of his competitors. He was ever seeking refinement in visual images, in sound and music, in acting style and directorial technique. Most of all, in writing. ... He recognized when words sang, when characters lost their cardboard effect and acquired dimension, when events could be so devised to stir the emotions and raise the spirit. Thalberg's films performed those feats to an amazing degree, and no filmmaker has since achieved his measure.

Most of MGM's major films in the 1930s were, according to Flamini, "in a very real sense", made by Thalberg. He closely supervised the making of "more pictures than any other producer in Hollywood's history", and was considered the "archetype of the creative producer", adds Flamini. Upon his early death, aged 37, an editorial in The New York Times called him "the most important force" in the motion picture industry. The paper added that for the film industry, he "set the pace and others followed ... because his way combined style, glamour, and profit." He is described by Flamini as having been "a revolutionary in a gray flannel suit".

Thalberg refused to take credit as producer, and as a result, his name never appeared on the screen while he was alive. Thalberg claimed that "credit you give yourself is not worth having". He also said "If a picture is good, they'll know who produced it. If it's bad, nobody cares." His final film, released after he died, was The Good Earth (1937), which won numerous Academy Awards. Its opening screen credit was dedicated to Thalberg:

To the Memory of Irving Grant Thalberg – we dedicate this picture – his last great achievement.

In 1938, the new multimillion-dollar MGM administration building in Culver City was named for Thalberg. The Irving G. Thalberg Memorial Award, presented by the Academy of Motion Picture Arts and Sciences, also named for him, awards producers for consistently high production achievements.

== Cultural legacy ==
=== The Last Tycoon ===
In October 1939, American novelist F. Scott Fitzgerald began writing The Last Tycoon, a fictionalized biography of Thalberg, naming the protagonist Monroe Stahr to represent Thalberg. "Thalberg has always fascinated me", he wrote to an editor. "His peculiar charm, his extraordinary good looks, his bountiful success, the tragic end of his great adventure. The events I have built around him are fiction, but all of them are things which might very well have happened. ... I've long chosen him for a hero (this has been in my mind for three years) because he is one of the half-dozen men I have known who were built on a grand scale."

Thomas notes that among the reasons Fitzgerald chose to write a book about a Thalberg-like character, was that "throughout his literary career, Fitzgerald borrowed his heroes from friends he admired, and inevitably a bit of Fitzgerald entered the characterizations." Fitzgerald himself writes that "When I like men, I want to be like them ..." Fitzgerald and Thalberg had real-life similarities: both were prodigies, both had heart ailments, and they both died at early ages.

According to biographer Matthew J. Bruccoli, Fitzgerald believed that Thalberg, with his "taste and courage, represented the best of Hollywood. ... [and] saw Thalberg as a model for what could be done in the movies." Fitzgerald died before the novel was completed, however. Bruccoli writes of Fitzgerald's book:

Nurturing a heroic sense of American character, he found his essential American figure in his last novel. ... So thorough was Fitzgerald's identification with his hero that Stahr stands among the most compelling Jewish characters in American fiction.

Although parallels between Monroe Stahr in the novel and Thalberg were evident, many who knew Thalberg intimately stated that they did not see similarities in their personalities. Norma Shearer said that the Stahr character was not at all like her late husband.

In the 1976 film version, directed by Elia Kazan, Monroe Stahr was played by Robert De Niro. Kazan, in his pre-production notes, described the Stahr character as he saw him:

Stahr is special, unique, monastic, a relic. He walks alone. Occasionally men follow him waiting for orders. He is in a daze of work and thought. He carries the whole studio operation in his head.

In the 2016 television series based on the novel, Monroe Stahr is played by Matt Bomer.

=== Others ===
Fitzgerald also based his short story "Crazy Sunday", originally published in the October 1932 issue of American Mercury, on an incident at a party thrown by Thalberg and Shearer. The story is included in Fitzgerald's collection Taps at Reveille (1935).

Thalberg was portrayed in the movie Man of a Thousand Faces (1957) by Robert Evans, who went on to become a studio head himself.

Thalberg is parodied as Irving C. Saltzberg Jnr. in the sketch 20th Century Vole in episode 6 of Monty Python's Flying Circus. Unlike the real-life publicity-shy Thalberg, Saltzberg is obsessed with controlling (and being credited for) every single bit of a production, including writing, directing and producing, and this is likewise reflected in the closing credits (which immediately follow the sketch) for the episode. The episode is also announced as "An Irving C. Saltzberg Productions Ltd. and Saltzberg Art Films, Oil, Real Estate, Banking and Prostitution Inc. Co-Production."

Thalberg was portrayed by Bill Cusack in Young Indiana Jones and the Hollywood Follies (1994), a TV film based on The Young Indiana Jones Chronicles, in which Indiana Jones is depicted as taking part in Thalberg's conflict with Erich von Stroheim over Foolish Wives.

In 2020, Thalberg is played by Ferdinand Kingsley in the David Fincher film Mank. Max Minghella portrays him in Damien Chazelle's 2022 film Babylon. Thalberg was played by Daniel Iofredda in the 2022 Netflix series "Titans: The Rise of Hollywood.

== Filmography ==
=== Producer ===
- Reputation (1921)
- The Hunchback of Notre Dame (1923)
- Merry-Go-Round (1923)
- His Hour (1924)
- He Who Gets Slapped (1924)
- The Unholy Three (1925)
- The Merry Widow (1925)
- The Tower of Lies (1925)
- The Big Parade (1925)
- Ben-Hur: A Tale of the Christ (1925)
- Torrent (1926)
- La Bohème (1926)
- Brown of Harvard (1926)
- The Road to Mandalay (1926)
- The Temptress (1926)
- Valencia (1926)
- Flesh and the Devil (1926)
- Twelve Miles Out (1927)
- The Student Prince in Old Heidelberg (1927)
- London After Midnight (1927)
- The Crowd (1928)
- Laugh, Clown, Laugh (1928)
- White Shadows in the South Seas (1928)
- Show People (1928)
- West of Zanzibar (1928)
- The Broadway Melody (1929)
- The Trial of Mary Dugan (1929)
- The Voice of the City (1929)
- Where East Is East (1929)
- The Last of Mrs. Cheyney (1929)
- The Hollywood Revue of 1929 (1929)
- Hallelujah (1929)
- His Glorious Night (1929)
- The Kiss (1929)
- Anna Christie (1930)
- Redemption (1930)
- The Divorcee (1930)
- The Rogue Song (1930)
- The Big House (1930)
- The Unholy Three (1930)
- Let Us Be Gay (1930)
- Billy the Kid (1930)
- Way for a Sailor (1930)
- A Lady's Morals (1930)
- Inspiration (1931)
- Trader Horn (1931)
- The Secret Six (1931)
- A Free Soul (1931)
- Just a Gigolo (1931)
- Menschen hinter Gittern (1931), German-language version of The Big House (1930)
- The Sin of Madelon Claudet (1931)
- The Guardsman (1931)
- The Champ (1931)
- Possessed (1931)
- Private Lives (1931)
- Mata Hari (1931)
- Freaks (1932)
- Tarzan the Ape Man (1932)
- Grand Hotel (1932)
- Letty Lynton (1932)
- As You Desire Me (1932)
- Red-Headed Woman (1932)
- Smilin' Through (1932)
- Red Dust (1932)
- Rasputin and the Empress (1932)
- Strange Interlude (1932)
- Tugboat Annie (1933)
- Bombshell (1933)
- Eskimo (1933)
- La Veuve Joyeuse (1934) French-language version of The Merry Widow
- Riptide (1934)
- The Barretts of Wimpole Street (1934)
- The Merry Widow (1934)
- What Every Woman Knows (1934)
- Biography of a Bachelor Girl (1935)
- No More Ladies (1935)
- China Seas (1935)
- Mutiny on the Bounty (1935)
- A Night at the Opera (1935)
- Riffraff (1936)
- Romeo and Juliet (1936)
- Camille (1936)
- Maytime (1937)
- A Day at the Races (1937)
- Broadway Melody of 1938 (1937)
- The Good Earth (1937)
- Marie Antoinette (1938)

=== Writer ===
- The Trap (1922)
- The Dangerous Little Demon (1922)

== Awards ==
Year	Award	Category	Film
1923	Photoplay Awards	Medal of Honor	The Big Parade
1932	Photoplay Awards	Medal of Honor	Smilin' Through
1934	Photoplay Awards	Medal of Honor	The Barretts of Wimpole Street

=== Academy Awards ===
Year	Result	Category	Film
1927–28	Nominated	Best Unique and Artistic Production	The Crowd
1928–29	Won	Best Picture	The Broadway Melody
1928–29	Nominated	Best Picture	The Hollywood Revue of 1929
1929–30	Nominated	Best Picture	The Divorcee
1929–30	Nominated	Best Picture	The Big House
1930–31	Nominated	Best Picture	Trader Horn
1931–32	Won	Best Picture	Grand Hotel
1931–32	Nominated	Best Picture	The Champ
1932–33	Nominated	Best Picture	Smilin' Through
1934	Nominated	Best Picture	The Barretts of Wimpole Street
1935	Won	Best Picture	Mutiny on the Bounty
1936	Nominated	Best Picture	Romeo and Juliet
1937	Nominated	Best Picture	The Good Earth

== See also ==
The Play of Everyman
