= Irving Thalberg Jr. =

American philosopher (1930–1987)

- Born: August 25, 1930; Los Angeles, California, U.S.
- Died: August 21, 1987 (aged 56); Syracuse, New York, U.S.
- Education: Institut Le Rosey
- Alma mater: Stanford University
- Occupation: Author
- Spouse: Deborah Pellow
- Children: 3
- Parents: Irving Thalberg (father); Norma Shearer (mother)

Irving Grant Thalberg Jr. (August 25, 1930 – August 21, 1987) was an American philosopher, author and the son of 1930s Hollywood producer Irving Thalberg and Academy Award-winning actress Norma Shearer.

Thalberg was six years old when his father died from pneumonia at the age of 37. He was educated at Institut Le Rosey in Switzerland and attended Stanford University. He was a professor of philosophy at the University of Illinois at Chicago until he died of cancer on August 21, 1987. He left behind his wife from his second marriage, the American anthropologist Deborah Pellow, and three daughters from his first marriage to Suzanne McCormick. Prior to the University of Illinois, he was briefly a professor at the University of Washington.

== Publications ==
Thalberg published two books of philosophical studies through the Muirhead Library of Philosophy: Enigmas of Agency (Allen & Unwin, London, 1972), and Perception, Emotion & Action (Blackwells, Oxford, 1977).

Unlike most epistemologists, Thalberg published articles that defended the Platonic tripartite analysis of knowledge (justified true belief, a.k.a. "JTB") against the more popular view that Gettier counterexamples refuted the JTB account. Specifically, Thalberg argued that justification is not transmissible through valid deduction.

== See also ==
- American philosophy
- List of American philosophers
