= National Union of School Students =

The National Union of School Students was a short lived British organisation founded in 1972. It campaigned for improvements in school education, for democracy in the systems used to manage schools and the taught curriculum. Major campaigns included opposition to compulsory school uniform, prohibiting any physical punishment, supporting teaching staff in pay and conditions struggles and freeing the Brockwell Three.

The NUSS had a national and district (branch) structure. The SW London Branch was very active from a number of comprehensive schools. The development of tactics and strategy was commonly in unison with North London school, NUSS members.

With a grant from the Calouste Gulbenkian Foundation, the union published the magazine Blot which featured the early work of the cartoonist Steve Bell.

== See also ==
Schools Action Union
