= Norma Shearer =

Canadian-American actress (1902–1983)

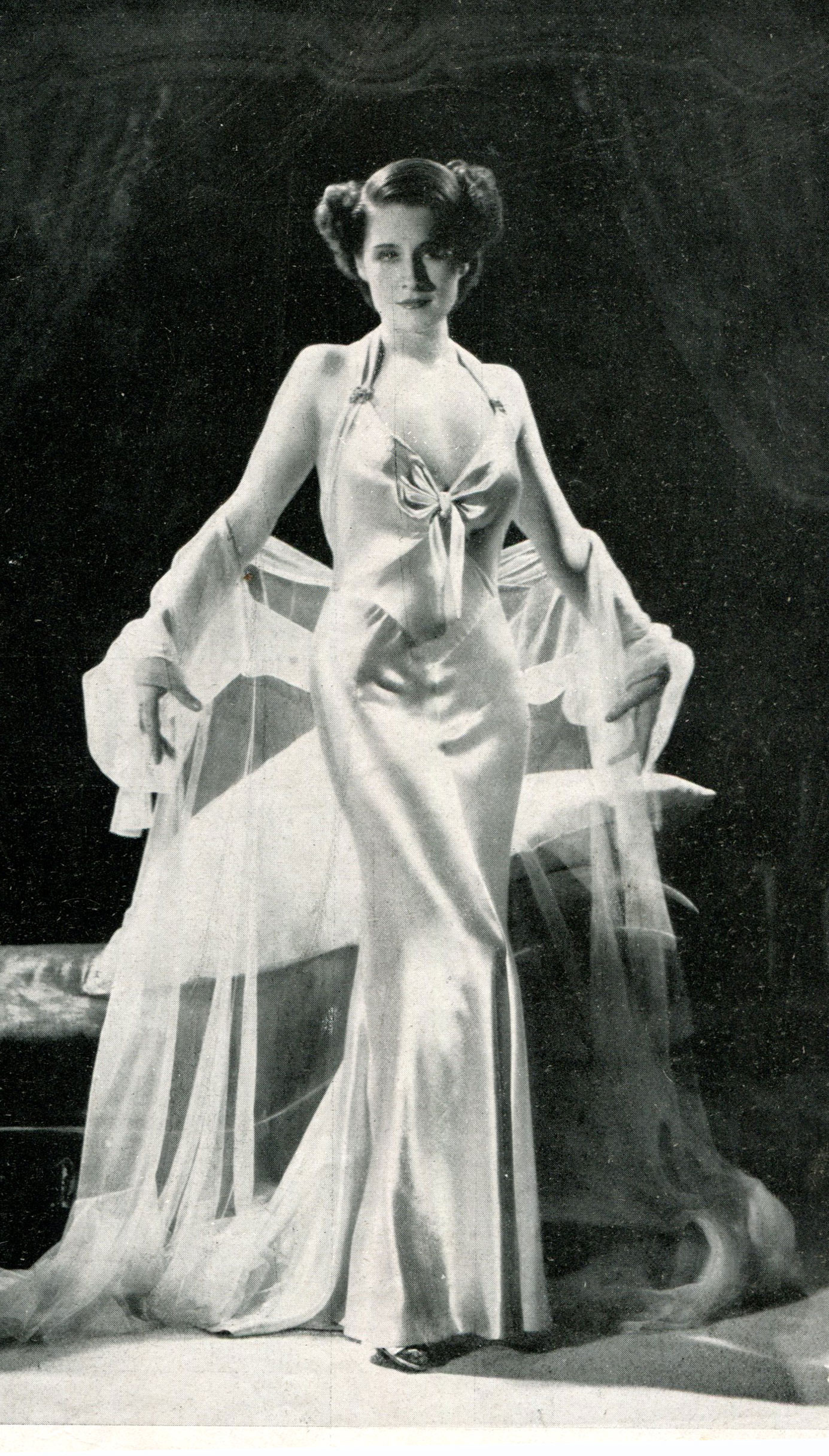
- Shearer in Riptide (1934)
- Born: Edith Norma Shearer; August 11, 1902; Montreal, Quebec, Canada
- Died: June 12, 1983 (aged 80); Los Angeles, California, U.S.
- Resting place: Forest Lawn Memorial Park, Glendale
- Citizenship: Canada; United States
- Occupation: Actress
- Years active: 1919–1942
- Political party: Republican
- Spouses: Irving Thalberg (m. 1927; died 1936); Martin Arrougé (m. 1942)
- Children: 2, including Irving Thalberg Jr.
- Father: Andrew Shearer
- Relatives: Athole Shearer (sister); Douglas Shearer (brother); Cresswell Shearer (uncle)

Edith Norma Shearer (August 11, 1902 – June 12, 1983) was a Canadian-American actress who was active in film from 1919 through 1942. Shearer often played spunky, sexually liberated women, appearing in adaptations of Noël Coward, Eugene O'Neill, and William Shakespeare. Shearer was the first five-time Academy Award acting nominee (ultimately nominated six times in all) and won Best Actress for The Divorcee (1930).

In reviewing Shearer's work Mick LaSalle called her a feminist pioneer, or "the exemplar of sophisticated modern womanhood and ... the first American film actress to make it chic and acceptable to be single and not a virgin on screen".

== Early life ==
Shearer was of Scottish, English, and Irish descent. Her childhood was spent in Montreal, where she was educated at Montreal High School for Girls and Westmount High School. Her life was one of privilege due to the success of her father's construction business. However, the marriage between her parents was unhappy. Andrew Shearer was prone to manic depression and "moved like a shadow or a ghost around the house." Her mother was Edith Mary (née Fisher) Shearer. Young Norma was interested in music, but after seeing a vaudeville show for her ninth birthday she announced her intention to become an actress. Edith offered support, but as Norma entered adolescence, Edith became secretly fearful that her daughter's physical flaws would jeopardize her chances. Norma Shearer stated, "[I] had no illusions about the image I saw in the mirror". She acknowledged her "dumpy figure, with shoulders too broad, legs too sturdy, hands too blunt" and was acutely aware of her small eyes that appeared crossed due to a cast in her left eye. By her own admission she was "ferociously ambitious" even when she was young.

The childhood and adolescence that Shearer once described as "a pleasant dream" ended in 1918 when her father's company collapsed and her older sister Athole suffered her first serious mental breakdown. Forced to move into a small, dreary house in a "modest" Montreal suburb, Shearer found her determined attitude strengthened by the sudden plunge into poverty: "At an early age, I formed a philosophy about failure. Perhaps an endeavor, like my father's business, could fail, but that didn't mean Father had failed."

Edith Shearer thought otherwise. Within weeks she had left her husband and moved into a cheap boarding house with her two daughters. A few months later, encouraged by Edith's brother, who believed his niece should try her luck in "the picture business", then operating largely on the east coast of the United States, Edith sold her daughter's piano and the family dog. In her pocket was a letter of introduction for Norma, acquired from a local theatre owner, to Florenz Ziegfeld who was preparing a new season of his famous Ziegfeld Follies.

== Career ==
=== Early days ===
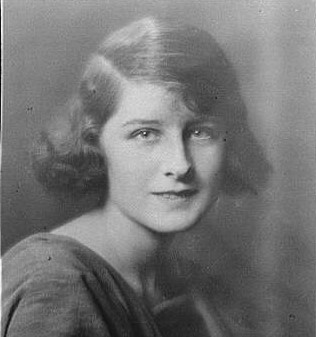
Portrait of Shearer by Arnold Genthe, c. 1920

In January 1920 the three Shearer women arrived in New York, each of them dressed up for the occasion. "I had my hair in little curls", Shearer remembered, "and I felt very ambitious and proud." Her heart sank, however, when she saw their rented apartment: "There was one double bed, a cot with no mattress, and a stove with one gas jet. The communal bathroom was at the end of a long, dimly lit hallway. Athole and I took turns sleeping with mother in the bed, but sleep was impossible anyway—the elevated trains rattled right past our window every few minutes."

The introduction to Ziegfeld proved equally disastrous. He turned Shearer down flat, reportedly calling her a "dog", and criticized her crossed eyes and stubby legs. She continued doing the rounds with her determination undimmed: "I learned that Universal Pictures was looking for eight pretty girls to serve as extras. Athole and I showed up and found 50 girls ahead of us. An assistant casting director walked up and down looking us over. He passed up the first three and picked the fourth. The fifth and sixth were unattractive, but the seventh would do, and so on, down the line until seven had been selected—and he was still some ten feet ahead of us. I did some quick thinking. I coughed loudly, and when the man looked in the direction of the cough, I stood on my tiptoes and smiled right at him. Recognizing the awkward ruse to which I'd resorted, he laughed openly and walked over to me and said, 'You win, sis. You're Number Eight.'"

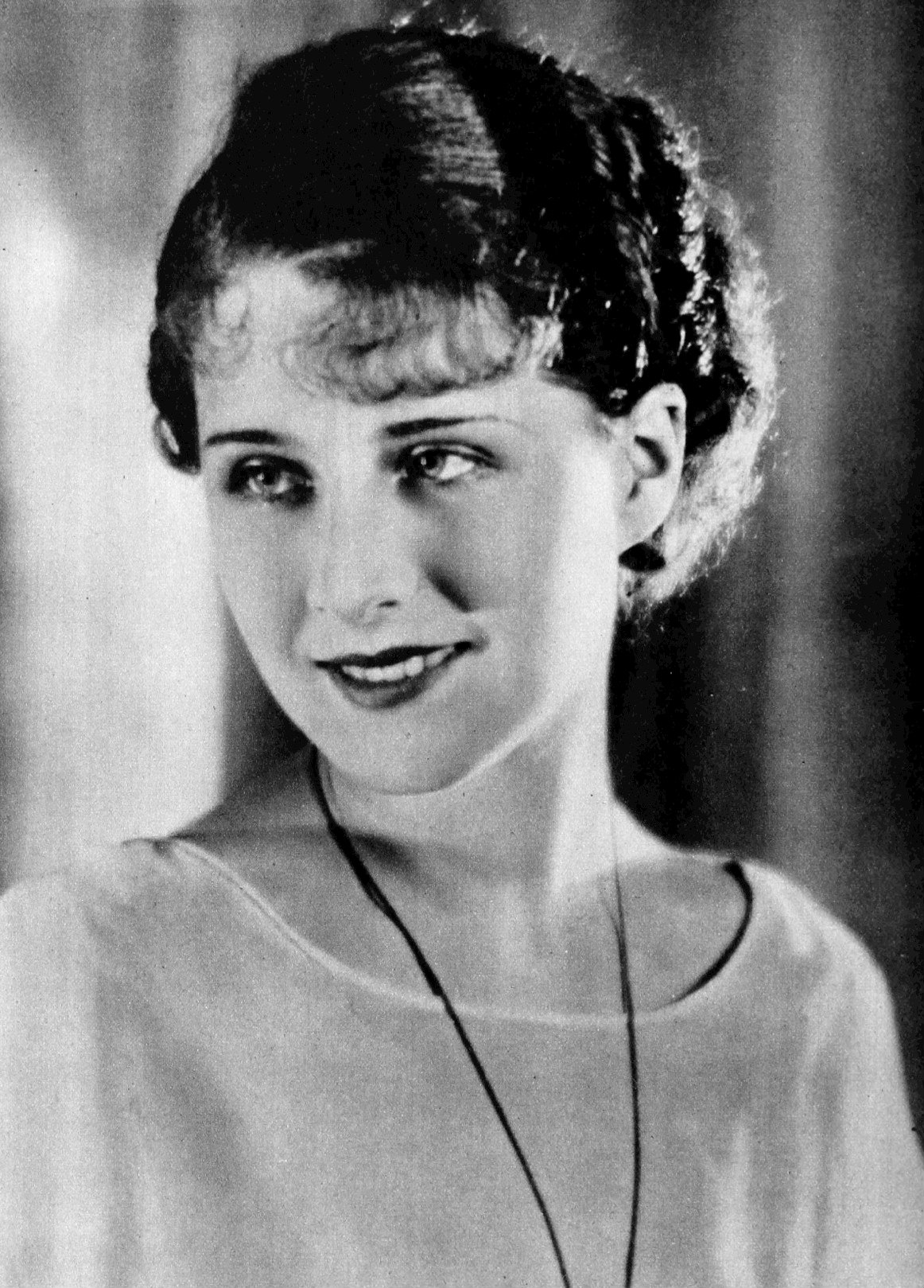
Norma Shearer's strabismus, 1926

Other extra parts followed, including one in Way Down East, directed by D. W. Griffith. Taking advantage of a break in filming and standing shrewdly near a powerful arc light, Shearer introduced herself to Griffith and began to confide her hopes for stardom. "The Master looked down at me, studied my upturned face in the glare of the arc, and shook his eagle head. Eyes no good, he said. A cast in one and far too blue; blue eyes always looked blank in close-up. You'll never make it, he declared, and turned solemnly away."

Still undeterred, Shearer risked some of her savings on a consultation with Dr. William Bates, about her strabismus. He wrote out a series of muscle-strengthening exercises that after many years' daily practice would successfully conceal Shearer's cast for long periods of time on the screen. She spent hours in front of the mirror, exercising her eyes and striking poses that concealed or improved the physical flaws noted by Ziegfeld or Griffith. At night she sat in the galleries of Broadway theatres, studying the entrances of Ina Claire, Lynn Fontanne, and Katharine Cornell.

In desperate need of money Shearer resorted to some modeling work, which proved successful. On her modeling career she commented: "I could smile at a cake of laundry soap as if it were dinner at the Ritz. I posed with a strand of imitation pearls. I posed in dust-cap and house dress with a famous mop, for dental paste and for a soft drink, holding my mouth in a whistling pose until it all but froze that way." She became the new model for Kelly-Springfield Tires, bestowed with the title "Miss Lotta Miles" and depicted seated inside the rim of a tire smiling down at traffic from a large floodlit billboard.

Finally a year after her arrival in New York, she received a break in film: fourth billing in a B-movie titled The Stealers (1920). In January 1923 Shearer received an offer from Louis B. Mayer Pictures, a studio in northeast Los Angeles run by the small-time producer Louis B. Mayer. Irving Thalberg had moved to Louis B. Mayer Pictures as vice president on February 15, 1923, but had already sent a telegram to Shearer's agent inviting her to come to the studio. After three years of hardship she found herself signing a contract. It called for $250 a week for six months, with options for renewal and a test for a leading role in a major film called The Wanters.

=== Hollywood ===
Shearer left New York around February 17. Accompanied by her mother, she felt "dangerously sure of herself" as her train neared Los Angeles. When she was not welcomed, even an hour after her arrival, she realized that there would be no star treatment from her new studio. Dispirited, she allowed Edith to hail a taxi.

The next morning Shearer went to the Mayer Company on Mission Road to meet with Thalberg. Shearer was momentarily unsettled by their confused introduction but soon found herself "impressed by his air of dispassionate strength, his calm self-possession and the almost black, impenetrable eyes set in a pale olive face".

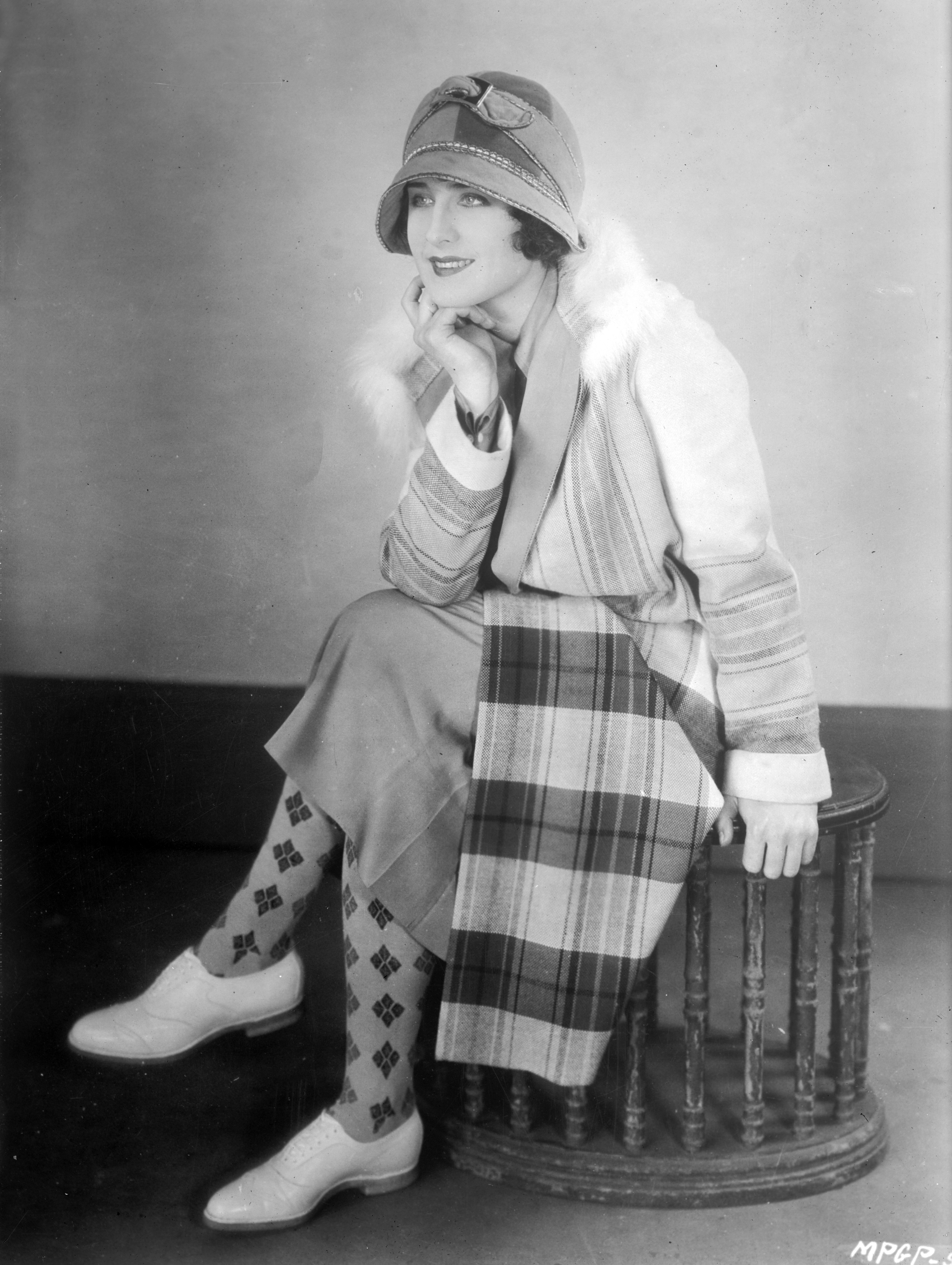
Shearer in an early MGM publicity photo

Shearer was less impressed, however, with her first screen test: "The custom then was to use flat lighting, to throw a great deal of light from all directions, in order to kill all shadows that might be caused by wrinkles or blemishes. But the strong lights placed on either side of my face made my blue eyes look almost white and, by nearly eliminating my nose, made me seem cross-eyed. The result was hideous."

The day after the test was screened for Mayer and Thalberg, cameraman Ernest Palmer found Shearer frantic and trembling in the hallway. Speaking with her he was struck by her "fierce, almost raging disappointment" and, after viewing the test himself, agreed that she had been "poorly handled". Under Palmer's own supervision a second test was made and judged a success by the studio executives. The lead in The Wanters seemed hers, until the film's director, John M. Stahl, objected, finding her "unphotogenic". Again Shearer was disappointed and was relegated to a minor role.

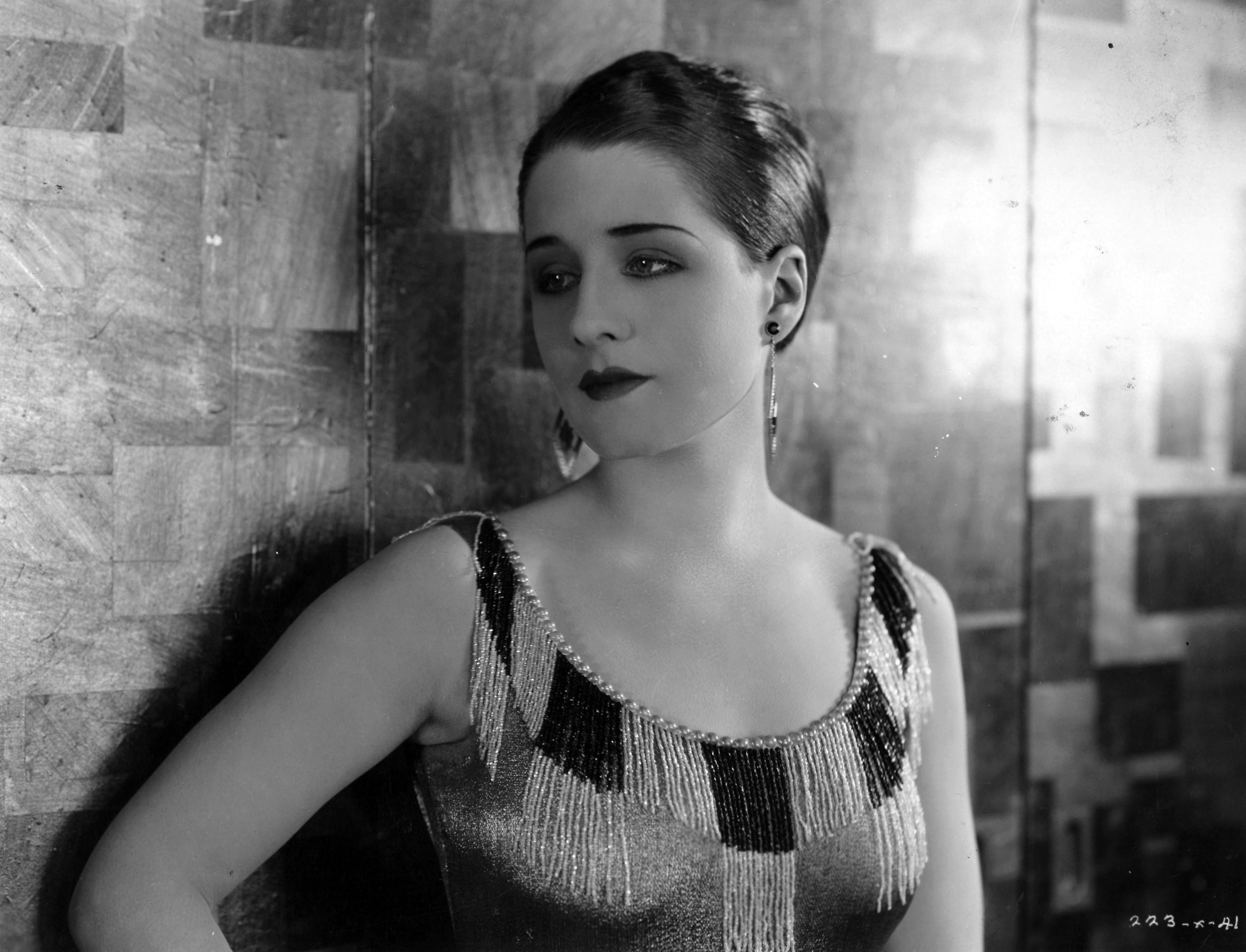
Shearer in A Slave of Fashion (1925)

She accepted her next role in Pleasure Mad, knowing "it was well understood that if I didn't deliver in this picture, I was through". After only a few days of shooting, things were not looking good. Shearer was struggling. Finally the film's director, Reginald Barker, complained to Mayer that he could get nothing out of the young actress, and when summoned to Mayer's office, she fully expected the axe to fall:

But to my surprise, Mr. Mayer's manner was paternal. 'There seems to be a problem,' he said, 'tell me about it.' I told him that the director had shouted at me and frightened me. Nobody had warned me that Mayer was a better actor than any of us, and I was unprepared for what happened next. He staged an alarming outburst, screaming at me, calling me a fool and a coward, accusing me of throwing away my career because I couldn't get on with a director. It worked. I became tearful, but obstinate. 'I'll show you!', I said to him, 'You'll see!'. Delighted, Mayer resumed the paternal act. 'That's what I wanted to hear', he said, smiling.

Returning to the set, Shearer acted in an emotional scene. "I took that scene lock, stock, and barrel, fur, fins and feathers", she remembered, earning her the respect of her director and her studio. As a reward Thalberg cast her in six films in eight months.

The apprenticeship was lucrative for Shearer. On April 26, 1924, Louis B. Mayer Pictures merged with Metro Pictures and the Samuel Goldwyn Company to form Metro-Goldwyn-Mayer. Shearer was cast with Lon Chaney and John Gilbert in the studio's first official production, He Who Gets Slapped. The film was a notable success and contributed to the meteoric rise of the new company and to Shearer's visibility. By late 1925 she was carrying her own films and was one of MGM's biggest attractions, a bona fide star. She signed a new contract; it paid $1,000 a week and would rise to $5,000 over the next five years. She bought a house for herself and Edith at 2004 Vine Street, which was located under the Hollywoodland sign.

=== Irving and Norma ===
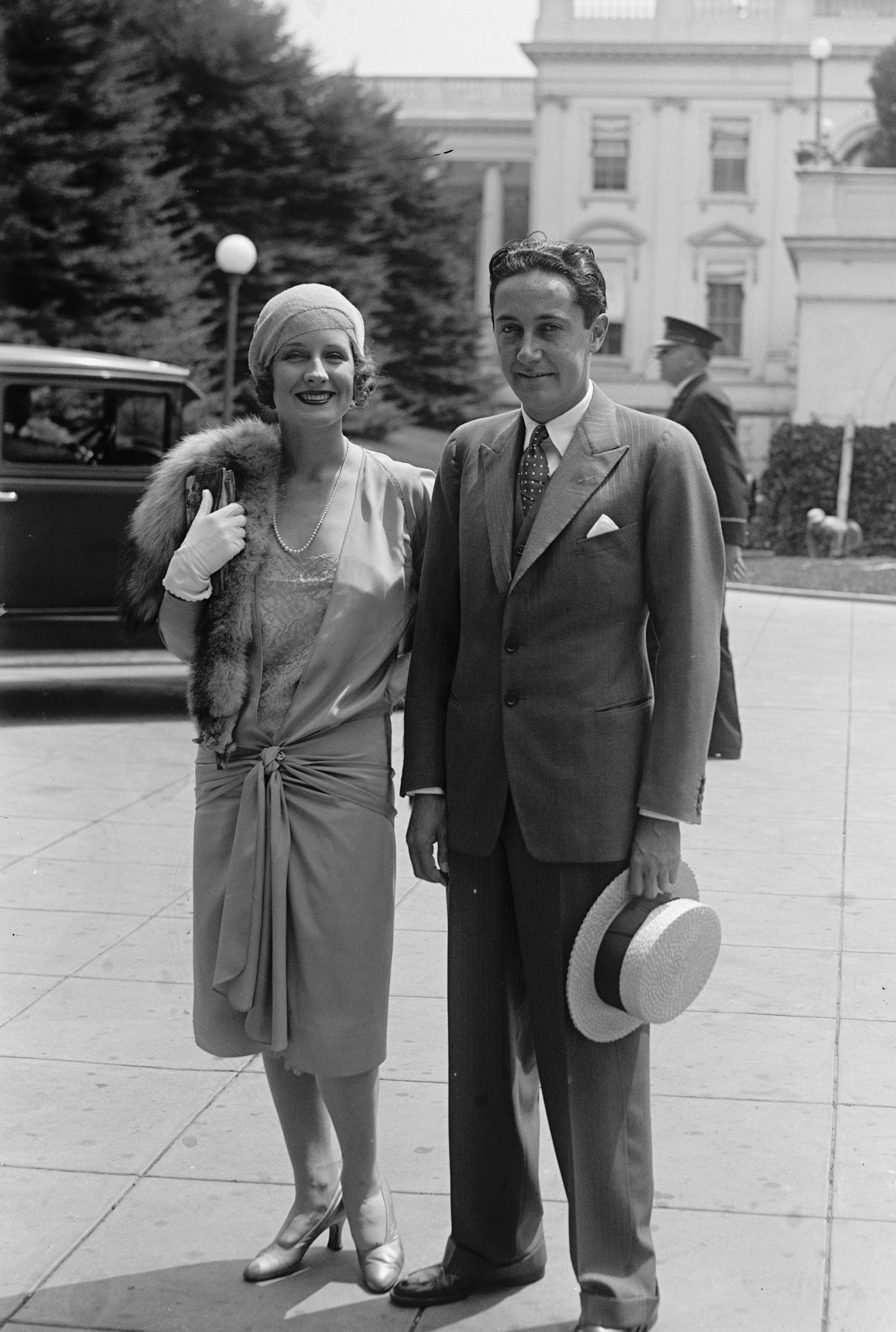
Shearer and Irving Thalberg outside the White House, 1929

Having become a star, Shearer's new challenge was to remain one. Many other talented actresses were at the studio, and she realized she would have to work hard to continue to get work. Seeing that newcomer Greta Garbo was a unique talent, Shearer went to Thalberg and "demanded recognition as one of another kind". She visited his office many times to plead for better material and parts. Thalberg would listen patiently, then invariably advise her to keep following MGM's orders, that the studio knew the best course of action for her, and that the movies she complained about had made her a popular actress. Occasionally, Shearer would burst into tears, but this seemed to make "no more impression than rain on a raincoat".

Privately, Thalberg was very impressed by Shearer. In a story conference, when her name was suggested to him for the part of a girl threatened with rape, Thalberg shook his head, and, with a wry smile, he said, "She looks too well able to take care of herself."

Thalberg's appeal was not primarily sexual. What attracted Shearer was his commanding presence and steely grace, the impression he gave that wherever he sat was always the head of the table. In spite of his youth – he was only 26 – Thalberg became a father figure to the 23-year-old actress.

At the end of a working day in July 1925, Shearer received a phone call from Thalberg's secretary, asking if she would like to accompany Thalberg to the premiere of Chaplin's The Gold Rush. That night, they made their first appearance as a couple. A few weeks later, Shearer went to Montreal to visit her father. While there, she had a reunion with an old school friend, who remembered: "At the end of lunch, over coffee, Norma leant in across the table. 'I'm madly in love', she whispered. 'Who with?' I asked. 'With Irving Thalberg', she replied, smiling. I asked how Thalberg felt. 'I hope to marry him', Norma said, and then, with the flash of the assurance I remembered so well, 'I believe I will.'"

Over the next two years, both Shearer and Thalberg saw other people. Louise Brooks remembered: "I held a dinner party sometime in 1926. All the place cards at the dinner table were books. In front of Thalberg's place was Dreiser's Genius, and in front of Norma's place, I put The Difficulty of Getting Married. It was so funny because Irving walked right in and saw Genius, and sat right down, but Norma kept walking around. She wouldn't sit down in front of The Difficulty of Getting Married – no way!"

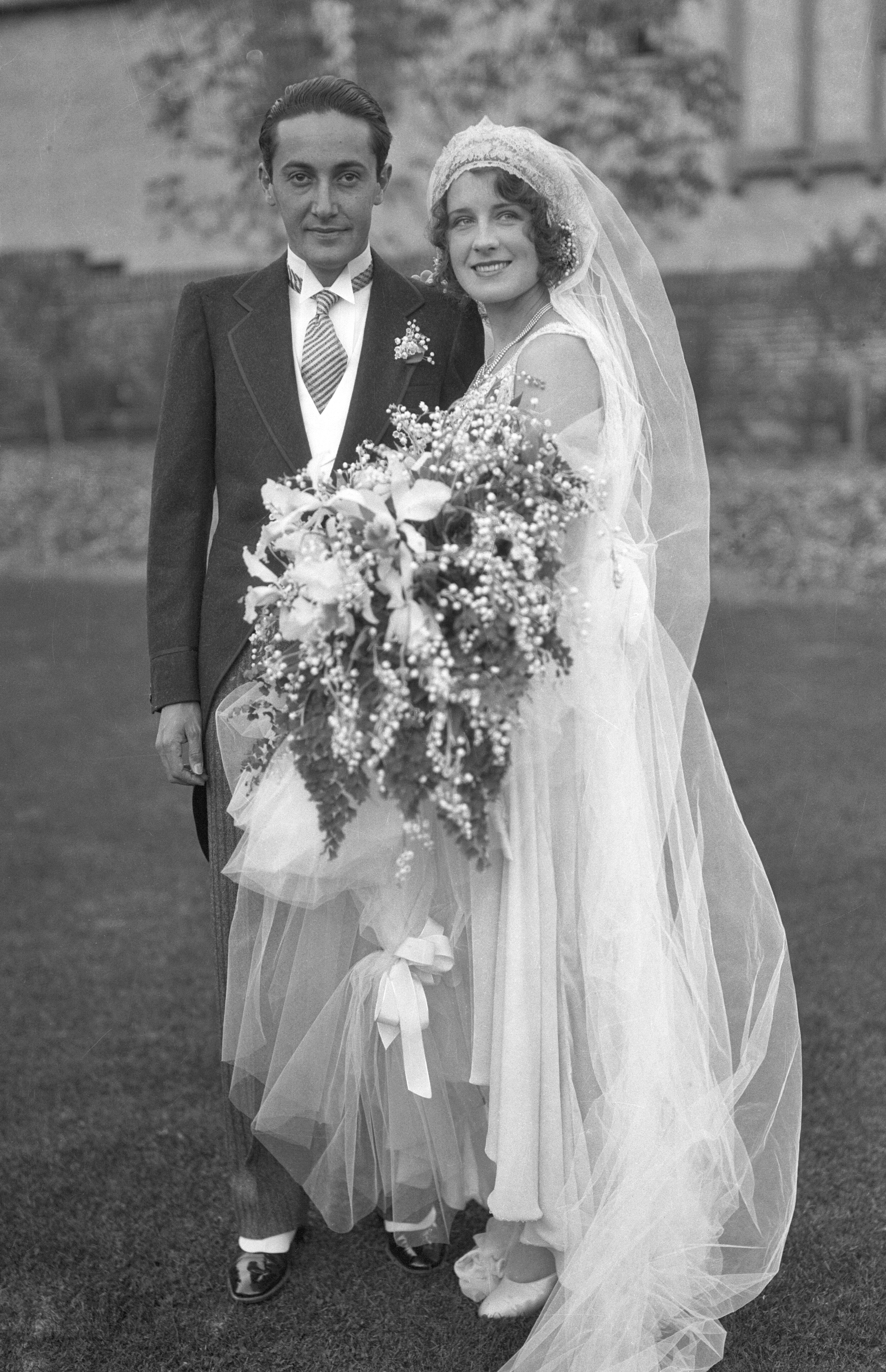
Shearer and Thalberg on their wedding day, 1927

By 1927, Shearer had made a total of 13 silent films for MGM. Each had been produced for under $200,000, and each been a substantial box-office hit, often making a $200,000+ profit for the studio. She was rewarded for this consistent success by being cast in Ernst Lubitsch's The Student Prince in Old Heidelberg, her first prestige production, with a budget over $1,000,000. While she was finishing The Student Prince, Shearer received a call summoning her to Thalberg's office. She entered to find Thalberg sitting at his desk before a tray of diamond engagement rings. He asked her to choose her own ring; she picked out the biggest. After weeks of rumors, provoked by wearing the ring, it was announced in August 1927 that they were planning to be married. On September 29, 1927, they were married in the Hollywood wedding of the year. Shearer had two children with Thalberg – Irving Thalberg, Jr. (1930–1987), and Katherine (1935–2006). Before they were married, Shearer converted to Judaism so she could marry Thalberg.

=== Transition to sound ===
One week after the marriage, The Jazz Singer was released. The first feature-length motion picture with sound, it effectively changed the cinematic landscape overnight and signaled the end of the silent motion-picture era. It also spelled the end of many silent film careers, and Shearer was determined hers would not be one of them. Her brother, Douglas Shearer, was instrumental in the development of sound at MGM, and she was given training to prepare for acting with a microphone.

Her first talking film, The Trial of Mary Dugan (1929), turned out to be a tremendous success. Shearer's "medium-pitched, fluent, flexible Canadian accent, not quite American, but not at all foreign", was critically applauded, and thereafter widely imitated by other actresses, nervous about succeeding in talkies. Despite the popularity of her subsequent early talking films, The Last of Mrs. Cheyney and Their Own Desire (both 1929), Shearer feared the public would soon tire of her "good girl" image, and took the advice of friend and co-star Ramón Novarro to visit an unknown photographer named George Hurrell. There, she took a series of sensual portraits that convinced her husband that she could play the lead in MGM's racy new film, The Divorcee (1930).

=== Pre-Code ===
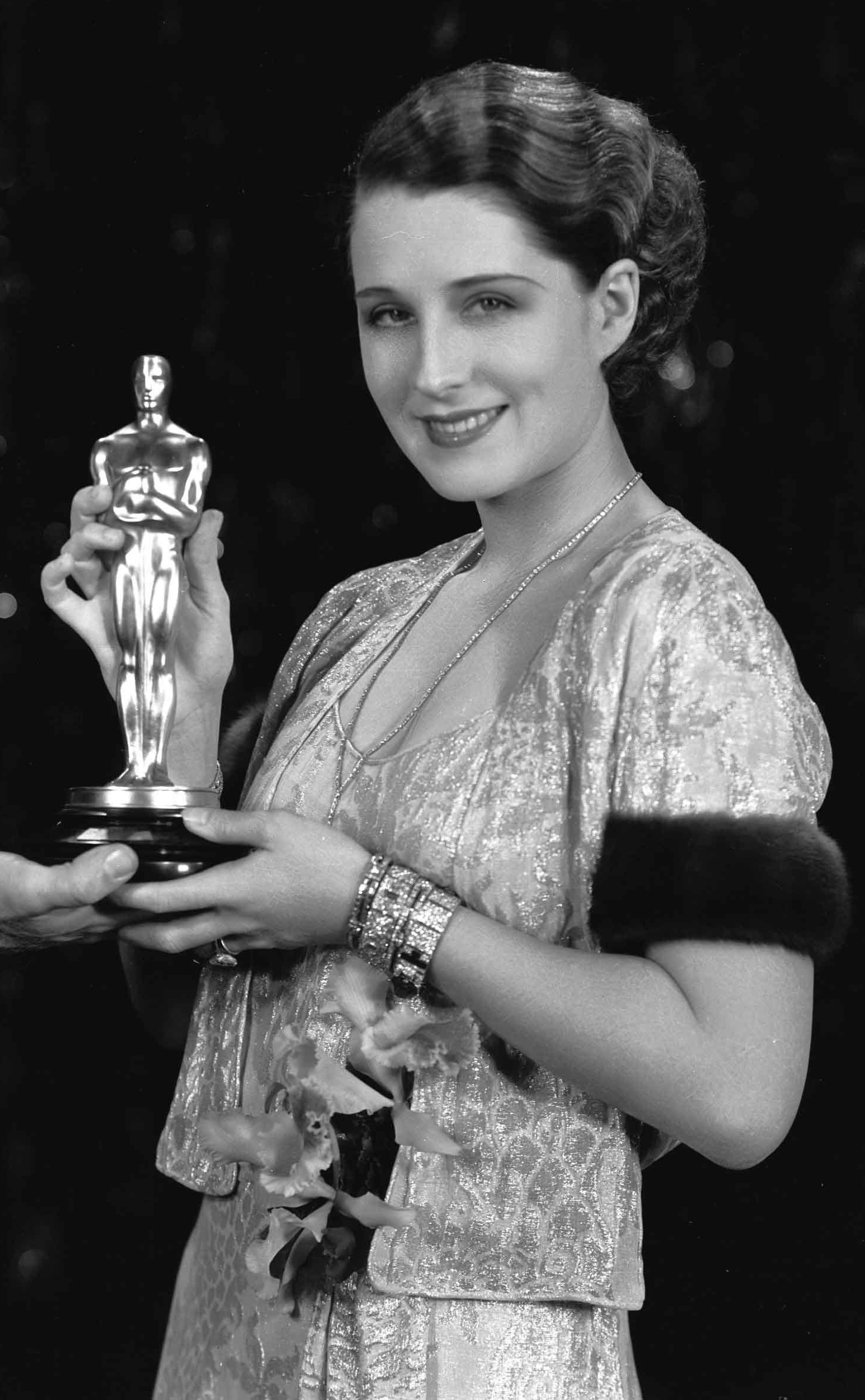
Norma Shearer holding her Best Actress award during the 3rd Academy Awards in November 1930.

Shearer won an Academy Award for Best Actress for her role in The Divorcee, and a series of highly successful pre-Code films followed, including Let Us Be Gay (1930), Strangers May Kiss (1931), A Free Soul (1931) with Leslie Howard and Clark Gable, Private Lives (1931), and Strange Interlude (1932). All of these were box-office hits, placing Shearer in competition with Joan Crawford, Greta Garbo, and Jean Harlow as MGM's top actress through the remainder of the decade.

Shearer's marriage to Thalberg gave her power in Hollywood that was resented by rivals such as Crawford, who complained that Shearer would always be offered the best roles and best conditions: "How can I compete with Norma when she's sleeping with the boss?"

Shearer's pre-Code films included period dramas and theatrical adaptations. Smilin' Through (1932), which co-starred Fredric March, was one of the most successful films of the period. A film version of Eugene O'Neill's four-hour experimental Strange Interlude (1932), which also starred Clark Gable, was a disappointing adaptation of the play, but it was a showcase for Shearer and another major hit.

=== The First Lady of MGM ===
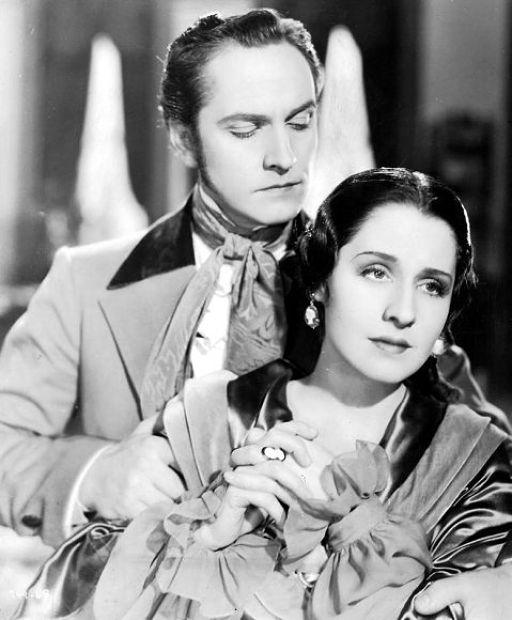
Fredric March and Shearer in The Barretts of Wimpole Street (1934)

The enforcement of the Production Code in 1934 forced Shearer to drop her celebrated "free soul" image, and move exclusively into period dramas and "prestige" pictures. Of these, The Barretts of Wimpole Street (1934) proved her most successful at the box office, making a profit of $668,000, in part because the film contained elements that slipped by the newly instituted Production Code. In that film, she played a role made famous by Katharine Cornell. Shearer also chose to act in another play popularized by Cornell in Romeo and Juliet (1936) (her first film of the 1930s to lose money), and Marie Antoinette (1938) (a budget of almost $2,500,000 was too great for the studio to expect a profit), though their elaborate sets and costumes helped make the films immensely popular with audiences.

Shearer was nominated for an Academy Award for Best Actress on six occasions, winning only for The Divorcee in 1930. She was nominated the same year for Their Own Desire, for A Free Soul in 1931, The Barretts of Wimpole Street in 1934, Romeo and Juliet in 1936, and Marie Antoinette in 1938. Marion Davies later recalled that Shearer came to a party at San Simeon in her Marie Antoinette costume; Davies said she was not about to remove the door so Shearer could enter, so Norma made her grand entrance through wider doors leading from another room. Four chairs were arranged so she could sit at the table in her voluminous skirts.

George Cukor, who directed Shearer in Romeo and Juliet, offered this character description of the actress:

"I found that Norma Shearer, when I made Romeo and Juliet, is a nervous, highly self-critical woman who has schooled herself to give an impression of self-confidence. If one had accepted that impression, one would have gone far astray in working with her. She needed sympathy and reassurance. Another way in which Miss Shearer might mislead a—I am sure she continually misleads herself—is in the matter of physical resources and sheer stamina. She becomes so engrossed in her work, so keyed up with a kind of taut, nervous energy, that she is apt to overtax her strength. She will play a long, exhausting scene over and over again without appearing to lose an atom of her freshness and verve. When it is over she will tell you she feels fine—and believe it. Then she will go to her dressing room and collapse. If one worked her as hard as she seems to want to work, she would be worn out before the film was half finished. With her, the director has to reverse the normal process of inspiring his star to greater efforts. He has to persuade her to spare herself. The greatest joy of working with Miss Shearer comes from her complete lack of vanity. Far from bridling at minor criticisms as many actresses do, she will criticize herself with a penetrating, almost unfeminine, impersonal judgment. When she sees the unedited versions of the previous days footage ["rushes"] she seems to cease to be an actress and to look at her own work on the screen with the shrewd and critical mind of a producer."

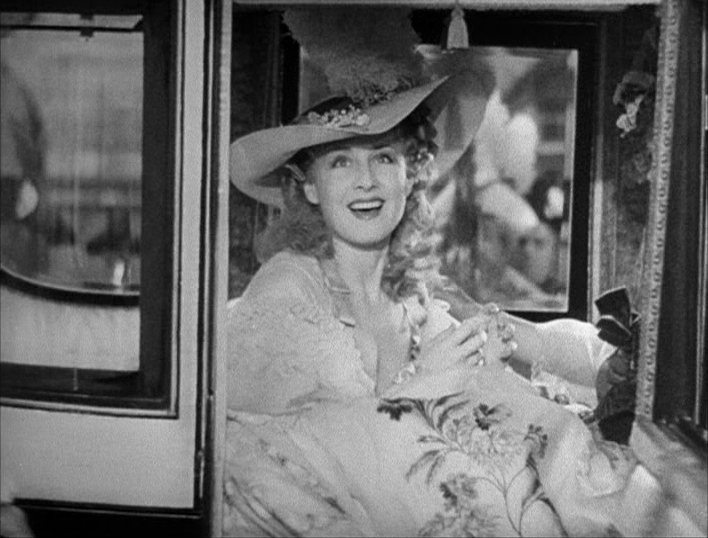
Shearer in Marie Antoinette (1938)

In 1939, she attempted an unusual role in the dark comedy Idiot's Delight, adapted from the 1936 Robert E. Sherwood play. It was the last of Shearer's three films with Clark Gable, after A Free Soul (1931) and Strange Interlude (1932). The Women (1939) followed, with an entirely female cast of more than 130 speaking roles.

Shearer was also one of the many actresses considered for the role of Scarlett O'Hara in Gone With The Wind (1939) and some publications even reported that she won the role in 1938. However, she withdrew herself from consideration after negative feedback from movie fans. Years later when asked about potentially playing Scarlett, Shearer jokingly said, "Scarlett is a thankless role. The one I'd really like to play is Rhett!"

Critics praised the suspenseful atmosphere in her next film, Escape (1940), where she played the lover of a Nazi general who helps an American free his mother from a concentration camp. With increasing interest in the war in Europe, the film performed well at the box office, but Shearer passed up roles in highly successful films Now, Voyager and Mrs. Miniver, to star in We Were Dancing and Her Cardboard Lover (1942), which both failed at the box office. In 1942, Shearer unofficially retired from acting.

== Retirement ==
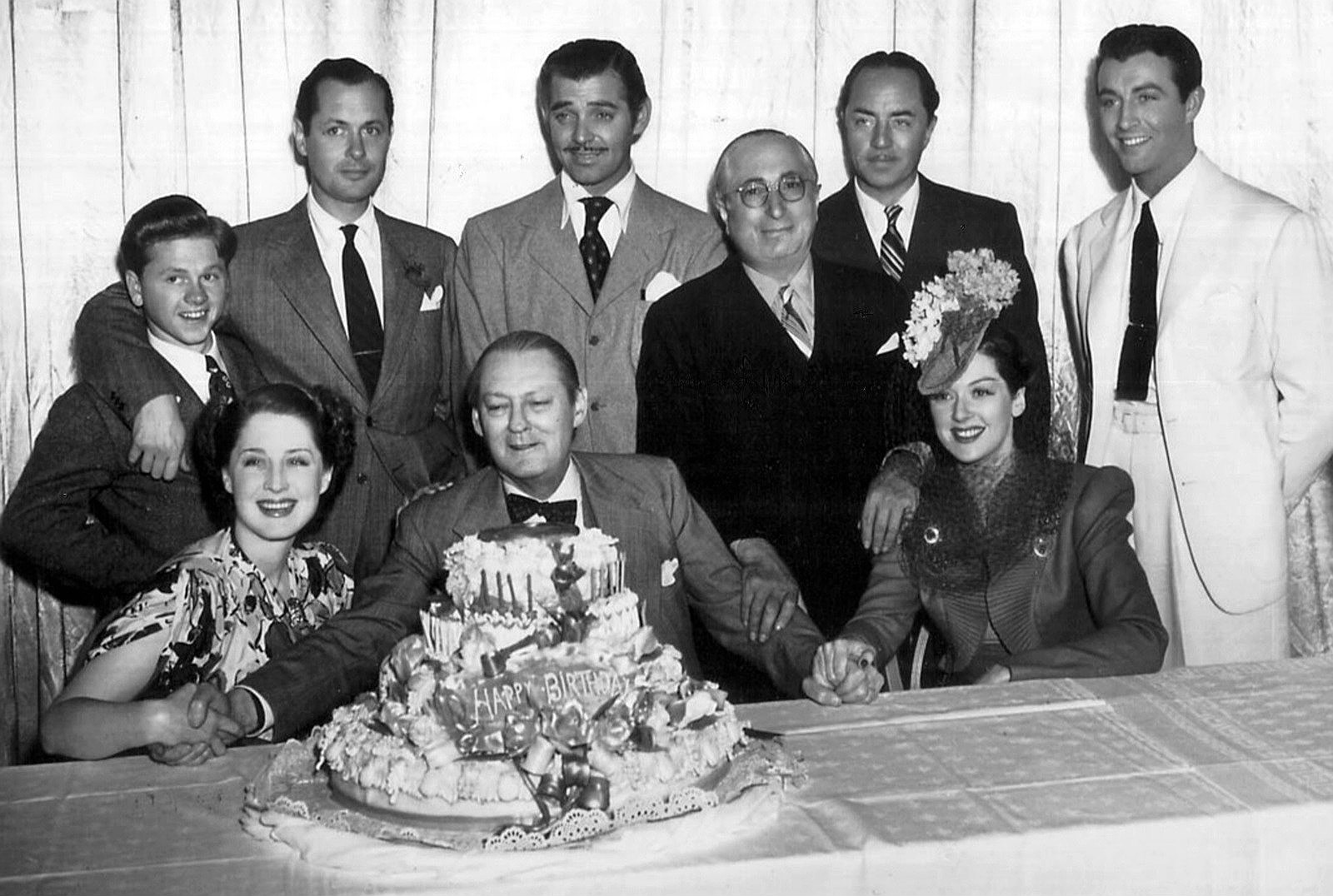
Lionel Barrymore's 61st birthday in 1939, standing: Mickey Rooney, Robert Montgomery, Clark Gable, Louis B. Mayer, William Powell, Robert Taylor, seated: Norma Shearer, Lionel Barrymore, and Rosalind Russell

After Thalberg's unexpected death on September 14, 1936, Shearer retained a lawyer to ensure that Thalberg's percentages of films on which he had worked were still paid to his estate, which was contested by MGM. When she took the story to gossip columnist Louella Parsons, the studio was forced to give in and granted all the profits from MGM movies made and released from 1924 to 1938, meaning the estate eventually received over $1.5 million in percentage payments. Nevertheless, Shearer's contract was renewed for six films at $150,000 each. During this time, she embarked on a brief romance with the younger actor James Stewart, and then with the married actor George Raft. Raft (who had separated from his wife years earlier, soon after they married) stated publicly that he wanted to marry Shearer. However, his wife's refusal to allow a divorce and the disapproval of MGM studio head Louis B. Mayer caused Shearer to end the affair.

Following her retirement in 1942, she married Martin Arrougé (March 23, 1914 – August 8, 1999), a World War II Navy aviator, a former ski instructor to her children, 11 years her junior. Despite often attending public events in her later life, Shearer gradually withdrew from the Hollywood social scene. In 1960, her secretary stated: "Miss Shearer does not want any publicity. She doesn't talk to anyone. But I can tell you that she has refused many requests to appear in motion pictures and TV shows." Arrougé and Shearer remained married until her death.

== Death ==
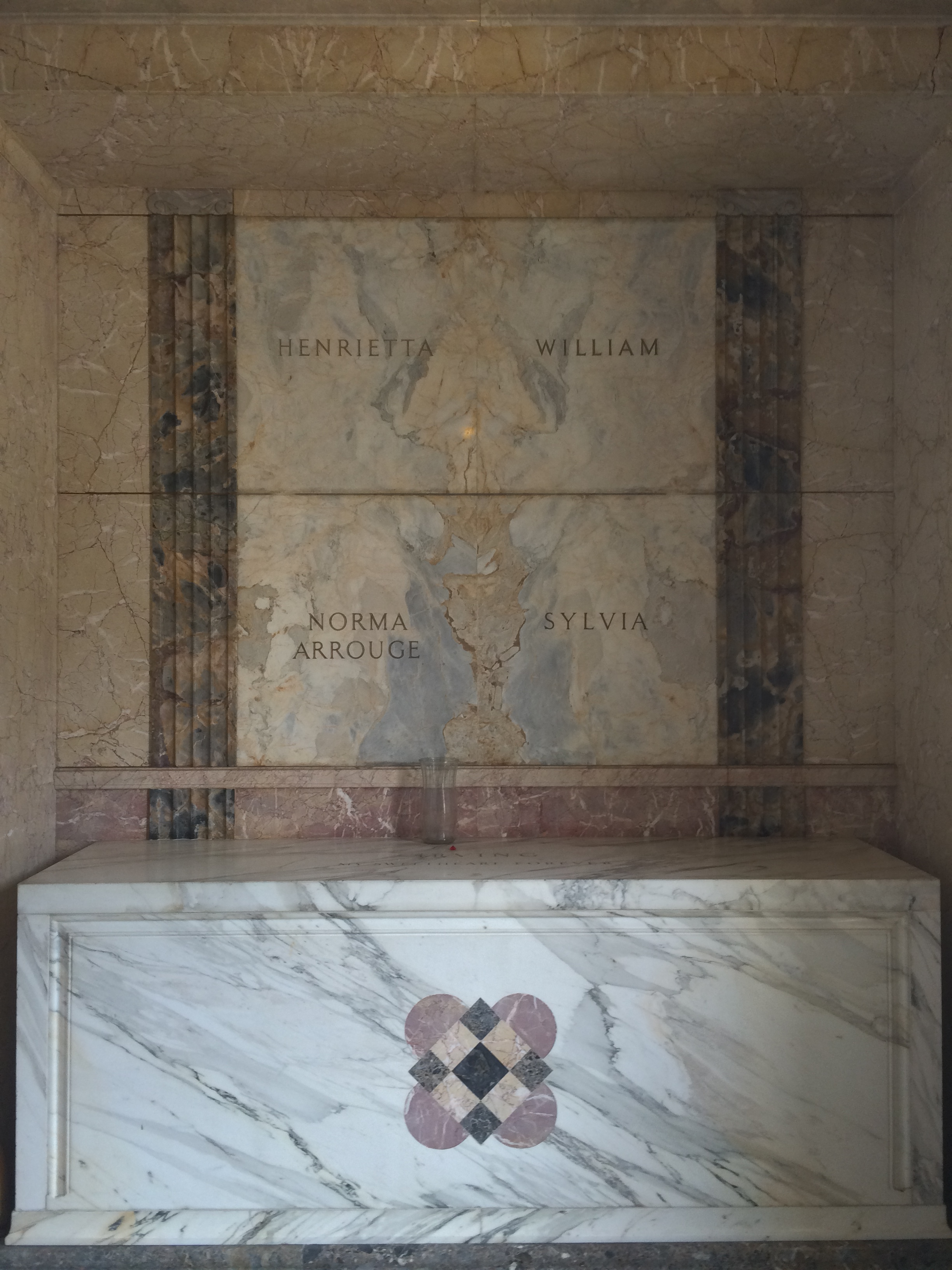
Shearer's crypt in the Great Mausoleum, Forest Lawn Glendale

On June 12, 1983, Shearer died of bronchial pneumonia at the Motion Picture Country Home in Woodland Hills, California, where she had been living since 1980.

She is entombed in the Great Mausoleum at Forest Lawn Memorial Park in Glendale, California, in a crypt marked Norma Arrouge, along with her first husband, Irving Thalberg.

== Legacy ==
Shearer's fame declined after her retirement in 1942. She was rediscovered in the late 1950s, when her films were sold to television, and in the 1970s, when her films enjoyed theatrical revivals. By the time of her death in 1983, she was best known for her noble roles in Marie Antoinette and The Women.

A Shearer revival began in 1988, when Turner Network Television began broadcasting the entire Metro-Goldwyn-Mayer film library. In 1994, Turner Classic Movies began showcasing her films, most of which had not been seen since the reconstitution of the Production Code in 1934. Shearer's work was seen anew, and the critical focus shifted from her noble roles to her pre-Code roles.

Even for a pampered star, her output in the sound era is strikingly meager. And yet this was part of her undeniable aura – that she did not make movies lightly and frivolously, but with great care, sincerity and conviction.

— Andrew Sarris, from "You Ain't Heard Nothin' Yet": The American Talking Film History & Memory, 1927–1949.

Shearer's work gained more attention in the 1990s through the publication of a series of books. The first was a biography by Gavin Lambert. Next came Complicated Women: Sex and Power in Pre-Code Hollywood by Mick LaSalle, film critic at the San Francisco Chronicle. Mark A. Vieira published three books on subjects closely related to Shearer: a biography of her husband, producer Irving Thalberg; and two biographies of photographer George Hurrell. Shearer was noted not only for the control she exercised over her work, but also for her patronage of Hurrell and Adrian, and for discovering actress Janet Leigh and actor-producer Robert Evans.

For her contribution to the motion-picture industry, Shearer has a star on the Hollywood Walk of Fame, at 6636 Hollywood Boulevard. On June 30, 2008, Canada Post issued a postage stamp in its "Canadians in Hollywood" series to honour Norma Shearer, along with others for Raymond Burr, Marie Dressler, and Chief Dan George.

Shearer and Thalberg are reportedly the models for Stella and Miles, the hosts of the Hollywood party in the short story "Crazy Sunday" (1932) by F. Scott Fitzgerald.

Most of Shearer's MGM films are broadcast on Turner Classic Movies, and many of them are also available on DVD from Warner Home Video. In 2008, she was inducted into Canada's Walk of Fame. In 2015, a number of Shearer films became available in high-definition format, authored by Warner Home Video, in most cases, from the nitrate camera negatives: A Free Soul, Romeo and Juliet, Marie Antoinette, and The Women.

Shearer is portrayed in director David Fincher's film Mank by actress Jessie Cohen.

== Awards and nominations ==
Shearer was the first person to receive five Academy Award nominations for acting. Her brother Douglas Shearer and she are the first Oscar-winning siblings.

Year	Award	Film	Result
1930	Academy Award for Best Actress	Their Own Desire	Nominated
1930	Academy Award for Best Actress	The Divorcee	Won
1931	Academy Award for Best Actress	A Free Soul	Nominated
1934	Academy Award for Best Actress	The Barretts of Wimpole Street	Nominated
1936	Academy Award for Best Actress	Romeo and Juliet	Nominated
1936	New York Film Critics Circle Award for Best Actress (3rd)	Romeo and Juliet	Nominated
1938	Academy Award for Best Actress	Marie Antoinette	Nominated
1938	Venice Film Festival – Volpi Cup for Best Actress	Marie Antoinette	Won

== Radio appearances ==
Year	Program	Episode/source
1941	Gulf Screen Guild Theatre	No Time for Comedy
1951	Screen Directors Playhouse	Waterloo Bridge

== See also ==
- List of actors with Academy Award nominations
