= List of documentary feature films nominated for Academy Awards =

This page highlights the documentary feature films nominated for or won Academy Awards aside from the Best Documentary Feature category.

== Feature film categories ==
=== Best Animated Feature ===
Year	Film	Award Recipient(s)	Result	Ref.
2021 (94th)	Flee	Charlotte de la Gournerie, Monica Hellström, Jonas Poher Rasmussen, and Signe Byrge Sørensen	Nominated	

=== Best International Feature Film ===
Year	Film	Award Recipient(s)	Result	Ref.
2008 (81st)	Waltz with Bashir	Ari Folman (Israel)	Nominated	
2019 (92nd)	Honeyland	Tamara Kotevska and Ljubomir Stefanov (North Macedonia)	Nominated	
2020/21 (93rd)	Collective	Alexander Nanau (Romania)	Nominated	
2021 (94th)	Flee	Jonas Poher Rasmussen (Denmark)	Nominated	

=== Best Unique and Artistic Production ===
Year	Film	Award Recipient(s)	Result	Ref.
1927/28 (1st)	Chang	Paramount Famous Lasky	Nominated	

== Writing (screenplay) categories ==
=== Best Original Screenplay ===
Year	Film	Award Recipient(s)	Result	Ref.
1949 (22nd)	The Quiet One	Helen Levitt, Janice Loeb, and Sidney Meyers	Nominated	

== Music categories ==
=== Best Original Score ===
Year	Film	Award Recipient(s)	Result	Ref.
1953 (26th)	This Is Cinerama	Louis Forbes	Nominated	
1958 (31st)	White Wilderness	Oliver Wallace	Nominated	
1970 (43rd)	Let It Be	John Lennon, Paul McCartney, George Harrison, and Ringo Starr	Won	
1975 (48th)	Birds Do It, Bees Do It	Gerald Fried	Nominated	

=== Best Original Song ===
Year	Film	Song/Award Recipient(s)	Result	Ref.
1963 (36th)	Mondo Cane	"More"; Nino Oliviero & Riz Ortolani (Music); Norman Newell (lyrics)	Nominated	
2006 (79th)	An Inconvenient Truth	"I Need to Wake Up"; Melissa Etheridge (Music & Lyrics)	Won	
2012 (85th)	Chasing Ice	"Before My Time"; J. Ralph (Music & Lyrics)	Nominated	
2014 (87th)	Glen Campbell: I'll Be Me	"I'm Not Gonna Miss You"; Glen Campbell & Julian Raymond (Music & Lyrics)	Nominated	
2015 (88th)	The Hunting Ground	"Til It Happens to You"; Lady Gaga & Diane Warren (Music & Lyrics)	Nominated	
2015 (88th)	Racing Extinction	"The Empty Chair"; J. Ralph (Music); Anohni (Lyrics)	Nominated	
2016 (89th)	Jim: The James Foley Story	"The Empty Chair"; J. Ralph & Sting (Music & Lyrics)	Nominated	
2018 (91st)	RBG	"I'll Fight"; Diane Warren (Music & Lyrics)	Nominated	
2023 (96th)	American Symphony	"It Never Went Away"; Jon Batiste & Dan Wilson (Music & Lyrics)	Nominated	
2024 (97th)	Elton John: Never Too Late	"Never Too Late"; Brandi Carlile, Elton John, Bernie Taupin & Watt (Music & Lyrics)	Nominated	
2025 (98th)	Diane Warren: Relentless	"Dear Me"; Diane Warren (Music & Lyrics)	Nominated	
2025 (98th)	Viva Verdi!	"Sweet Dreams of Joy"; Nicholas Pike (Music & Lyrics)	Nominated	

== Technical categories ==
=== Best Cinematography ===
Year	Film	Award Recipient(s)	Result	Ref.
1929/30 (3rd)	With Byrd at the South Pole	Joseph T. Rucker and Willard Van der Veer	Won	
1952 (25th)	Navajo	Virgil Miller	Nominated	

=== Best Film Editing ===
Year	Film	Award Recipient(s)	Result	Ref.
1970 (43rd)	Woodstock	Thelma Schoonmaker	Nominated	
1994 (67th)	Hoop Dreams	Frederick Marx, Steve James and William Haugse	Nominated	

=== Best Sound ===
Year	Film	Award Recipient(s)	Result	Ref.
1970 (43rd)	Woodstock	Dan Wallin and Larry Johnson	Nominated	

== Honorary Awards ==
Honorary Awards are given to celebrate noted achievements in motion picture arts. A handful of the honorary award recipients are awarded in their achievements in documentary feature films.

Year	Award Recipient(s)	Citation	Ref.
1953 (26th)	Pete Smith	"for his witty and pungent observations on the American scene in his series of 'Pete Smith Specialties'."	
1961 (34th)	William L. Hendricks	"for his outstanding patriotic service in the conception, writing and production of the Marine Corps film, A Force in Readiness, which has brought honor to the Academy and the motion picture industry."	
2012 (85th)	D. A. Pennebaker	"..[H]as inspired generations of filmmakers with his "you are here" style. He is considered one of the founders of the cinéma vérité movement..."	
2016 (89th)	Frederick Wiseman	"Wiseman has made one film almost every year since 1967, illuminating lives in the context of social, cultural and government institutions"	
2017 (90th)	Agnès Varda	"her compassion and curiosity inform a uniquely personal cinema"	

== Multiple wins and nominations ==
Film	Wins	Nominations
Woodstock	1	3
Flee	0	3
An Inconvenient Truth	2	2
White Wilderness	1	2
Collective	0	2
Honeyland	0	2
Navajo	0	2
The Quiet One	0	2
