= Norma Shearer filmography =

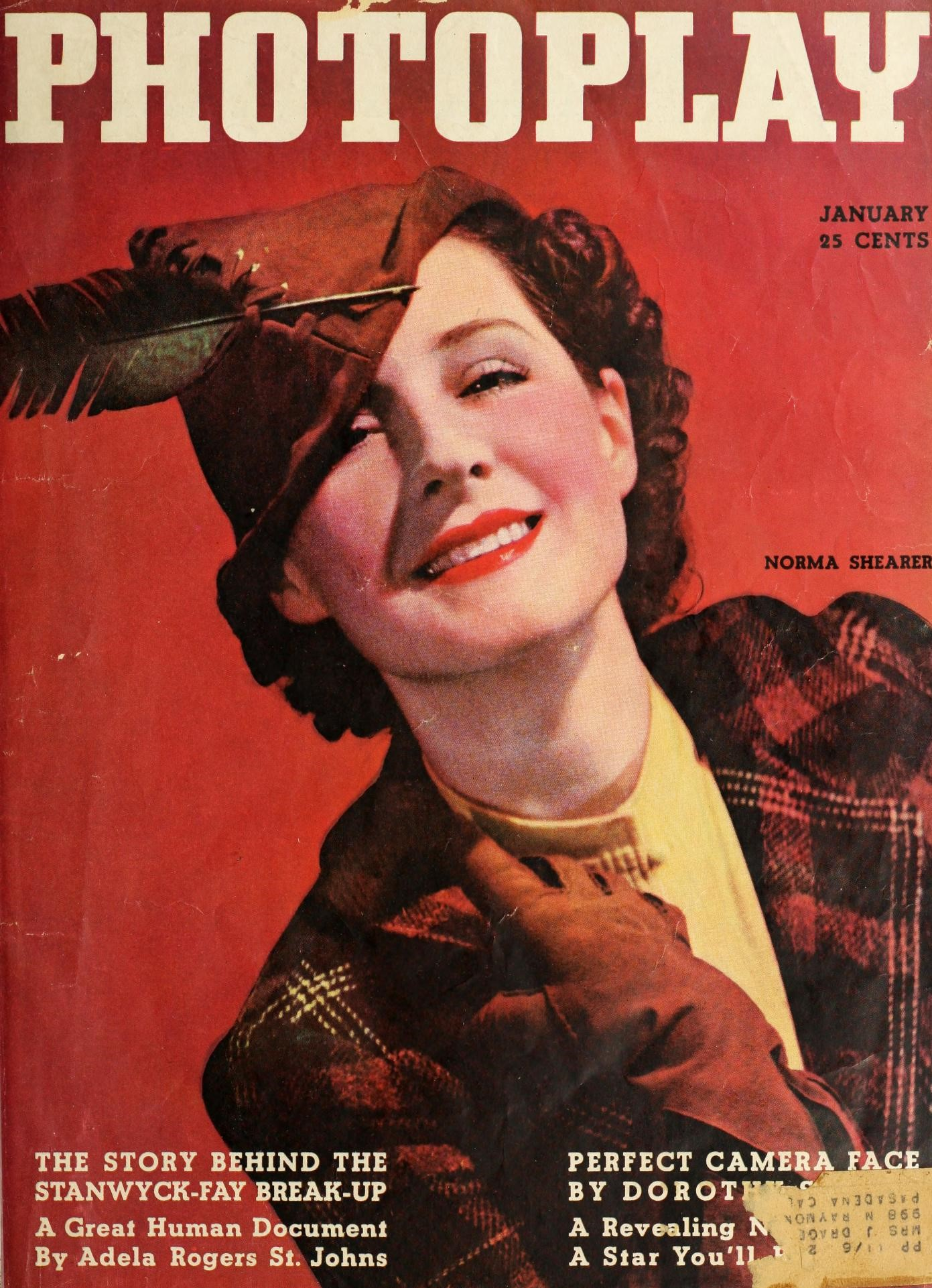
Norma Shearer on the January 1936 cover of Photoplay magazine

Norma Shearer (1902–1983) was a Canadian American film actress who was nominated five times for an Academy Award. She and her sister Athole were assisted in their pursuit of show business careers by their mother Edith Fisher Shearer. After amassing numerous letters of introduction from a variety of show business-related people in Canada, the trio relocated to New York, hoping to get into musical theatre.

She gained an introduction to impresario Florence Ziegfeld, who was unimpressed and turned her down. Shearer continued to pursue her career ambitions and spent five years being cast in bit parts in silent movies before landing a contract in 1923 with Louis B. Mayer, who had just formed Metro-Goldwyn-Mayer (MGM), with Irving Thalberg as his head of production. After a start in silent films, Shearer made a transition to sound film. She remained with MGM for the rest of her career, with occasional loan-outs to other studios. Shearer and Thalberg eventually married.

Shearer chose her own roles, frequently going against the professional advice of others. Her husband did not believe she would be well suited for the lead character in 1930 American pre-Code drama film The Divorcee. Nevertheless, she went against his counsel and made the movie, hiring celebrity photographer George Hurrell for a photo session to prove her sexual allure could translate to film. Her performance earned her the 1930 Academy Award for Best Actress. She was also nominated that same year for her performance in Their Own Desire. Shearer was nominated four more times for Academy Award for Best Actress: the 1931 film A Free Soul, the 1934 film The Barretts of Wimpole Street, the 1936 film Romeo and Juliet, and the 1938 film Marie Antoinette.

When her husband died in 1936, Shearer continued with her film career at MGM. Coming on the heels of her success in Marie Antoinette, a nationwide publicity campaign was launched to cast Scarlett O'Hara in Gone with the Wind. Producer David O. Selznick, however, had offered the role to Shearer. Her fans were incensed that she would portray a woman of such questionable character, and she eventually turned down the offer.

Norma's brother Douglas had remained in Canada until around 1925, when she introduced him to Louis B. Mayer, who arranged training for him at Bell Labs in the technique of adding sound to film. Her brother went on to earn 12 Academy Awards for his sound contributions to MGM.

Shearer received a star on the Hollywood Walk of Fame on February 8, 1960.

== Silent films: 1919–1928 ==
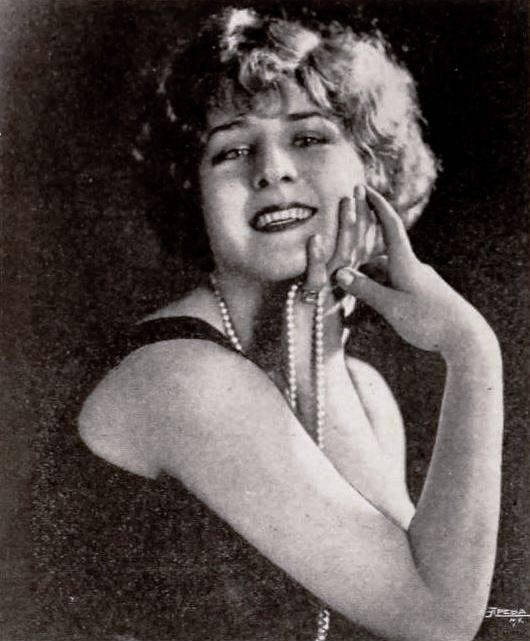
Norma Shearer (1921)

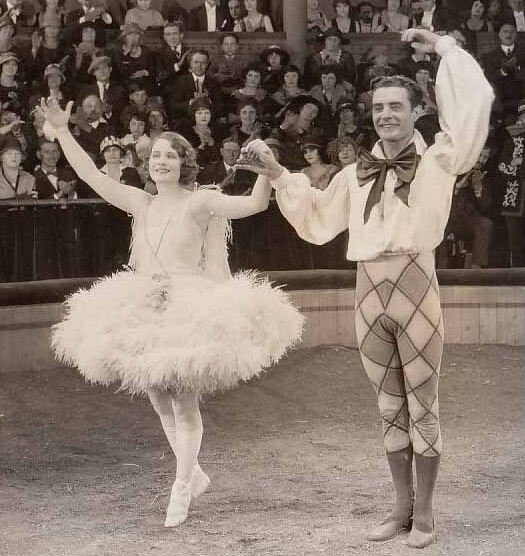
Shearer and John Gilbert in He Who Gets Slapped (1924)

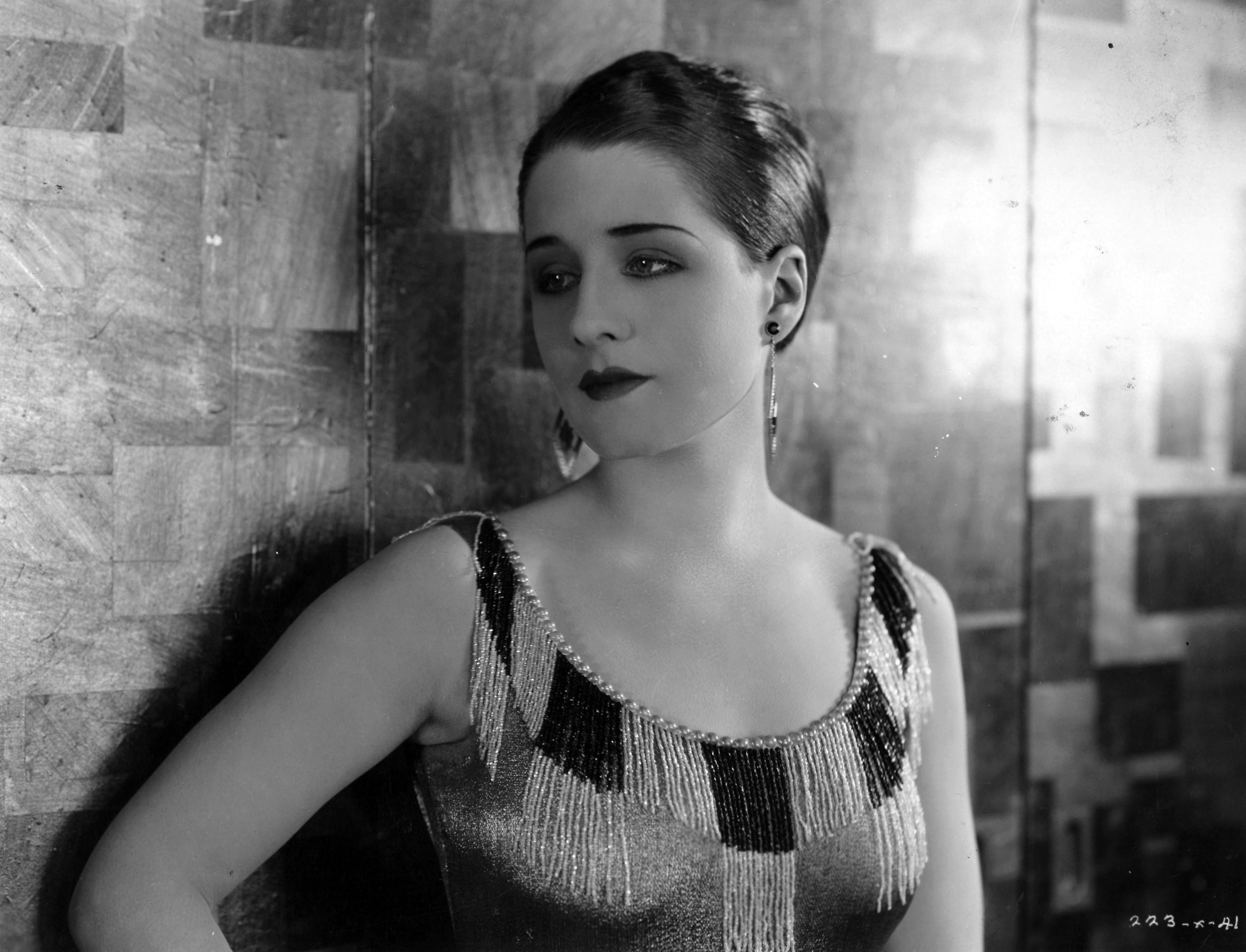
Norma Shearer in A Slave of Fashion (1925)

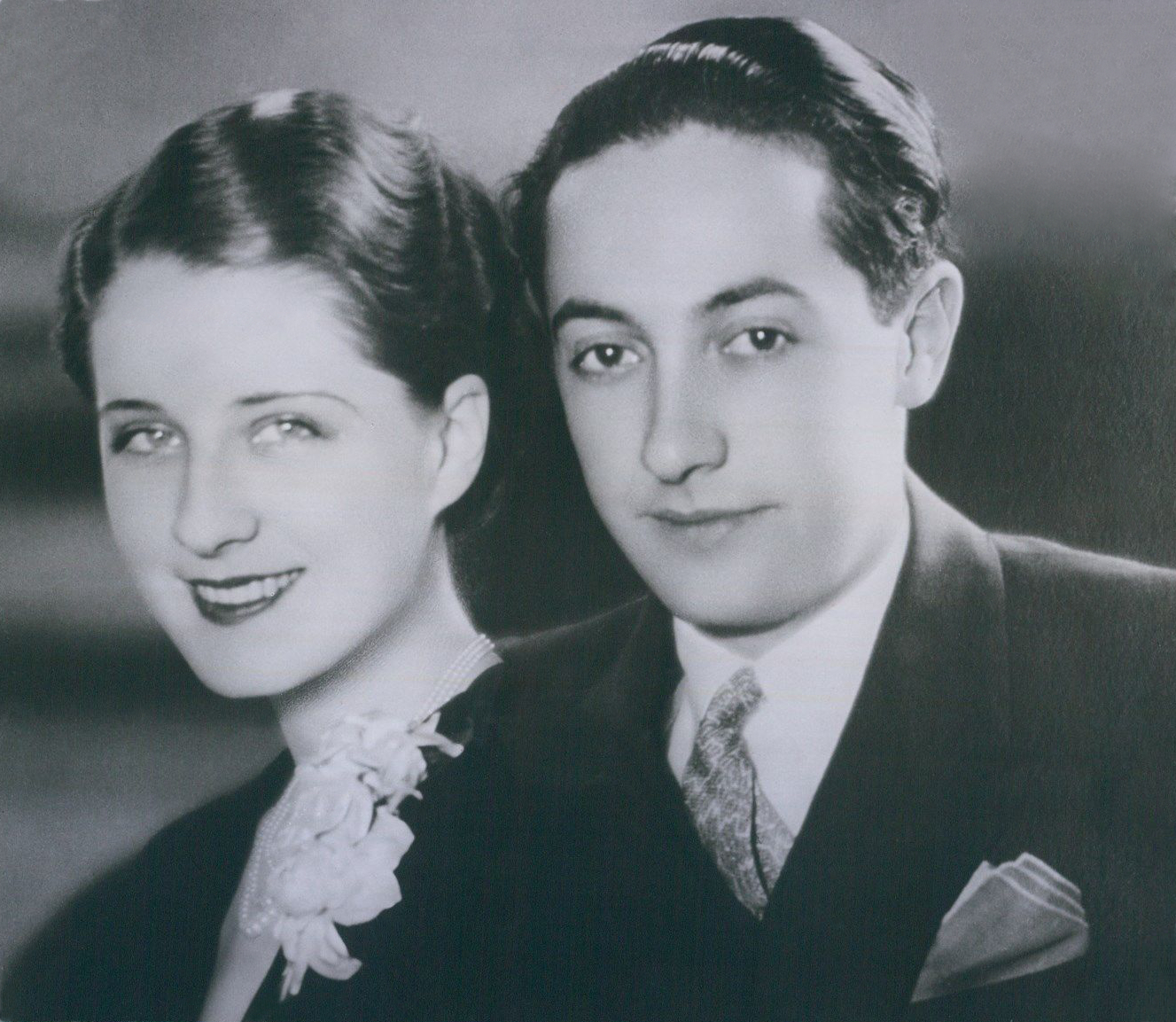
Norma Shearer and her husband, film producer Irving Thalberg (1928)

Norma Shearer silent films
Title	Year	Role	Notes	Ref(s)
The Star Boarder	1919	Member of the Beauties Squad	Vitagraph Studios	
The Flapper	1920	Extra	Selznick Pictures	
The Stealers	1920	Julia Martin	Robertson-Cole Studios, Inc.	
Way Down East	1920	Barn dancer	United Artists	
The Restless Sex	1920	Extra	Cosmopolitan Productions	
The Sign on the Door	1921	Uncredited; Edited out	First National Pictures	
Torchy's Millions	1921	Unknown	Educational film	
The Leather Pushers	1922	Unknown	Universal Pictures	
The Man Who Paid	1922	Jeanne	Apfel Productions	
The Bootleggers	1922	Helen Barnes	Al Gilbert Film Productions	
Channing of the Northwest	1922	Jes Driscoll	Selznick Pictures	
A Clouded Name	1923	Marjorie Dare	Logan Productions	
Man and Wife	1923	Dora Perkins	Arrow Film Corporation	
The Devil's Partner	1923	Jeanne	Iroquois Productions	
Pleasure Mad	1923	Elinor Benton	Metro Pictures	
The Wanters	1923	Marjorie	First National Pictures	
Lucretia Lombard	1923	Mimi	Warner Bros.	
The Trail of the Law	1923	Jerry Vardon	Producers Security Corporation	
The Wolf Man	1924	Elizabeth Gordon	Fox Film	
Blue Water	1924	Lillian Denton	New Brunswick Films	
Broadway After Dark	1924	Rose Dulane	Warner Bros.	
Broken Barriers	1924	Grace Durland	MGM	
Married Flirts	1924	Herself, cameo appearance	MGM	
Empty Hands	1924	Claire Endicott	Paramount	
The Snob	1924	Nancy Claxton	MGM	
He Who Gets Slapped	1924	Consuelo	MGM	
Excuse Me	1925	Marjorie Newton	MGM	
Lady of the Night	1925	Molly/Florence	MGM	
Waking Up the Town	1925	Mary Ellen Hope	United Artists	
A Slave of Fashion	1925	Katherine Emerson	MGM	
Pretty Ladies	1925	Frances White	MGM	
The Tower of Lies	1925	Glory	MGM	
His Secretary	1925	Ruth Lawrence	MGM	
The Devil's Circus	1926	Mary	MGM	
The Waning Sex	1926	Nina Duane	MGM	
Upstage	1926	Dolly Haven	MGM	
The Demi-Bride	1927	Criquette	MGM	
After Midnight	1927	Mary	MGM	
The Student Prince in Old Heidelberg	1927	Kathi	MGM	
The Latest from Paris	1928	Ann Dolan	MGM	
The Actress	1928	Rose Trelawny	MGM; Shearer's final silent film	
A Lady of Chance	1928	Dolly	MGM	

== Sound films: 1928–1963 ==
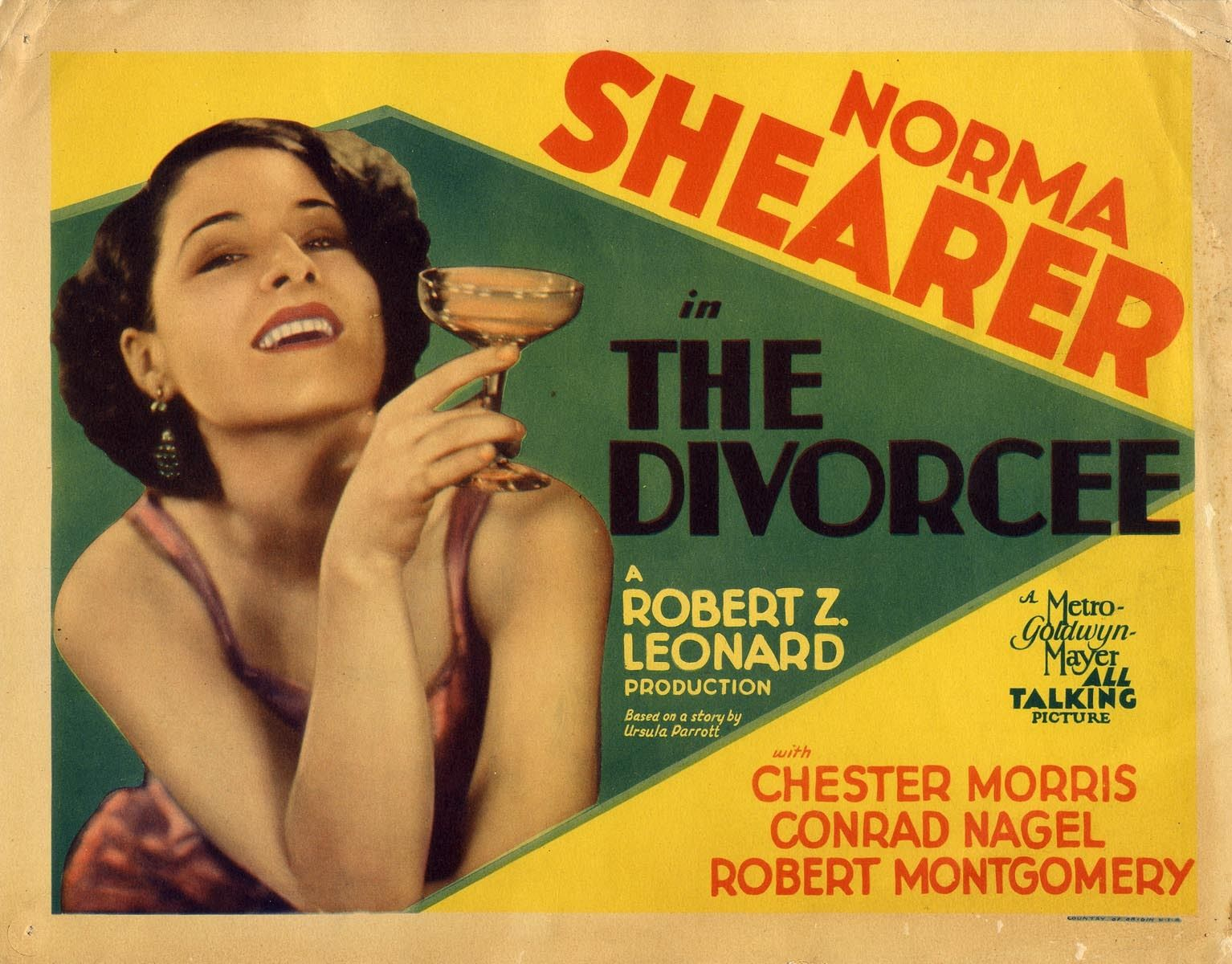
Lobby card for The Divorcee (1930), for which Shearer won her only Academy Award

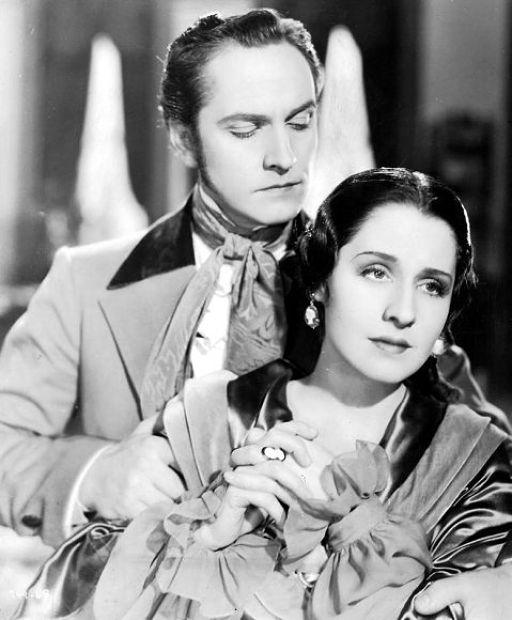
Norma Shearer and Fredric March for The Barretts of Wimpole Street (1934)

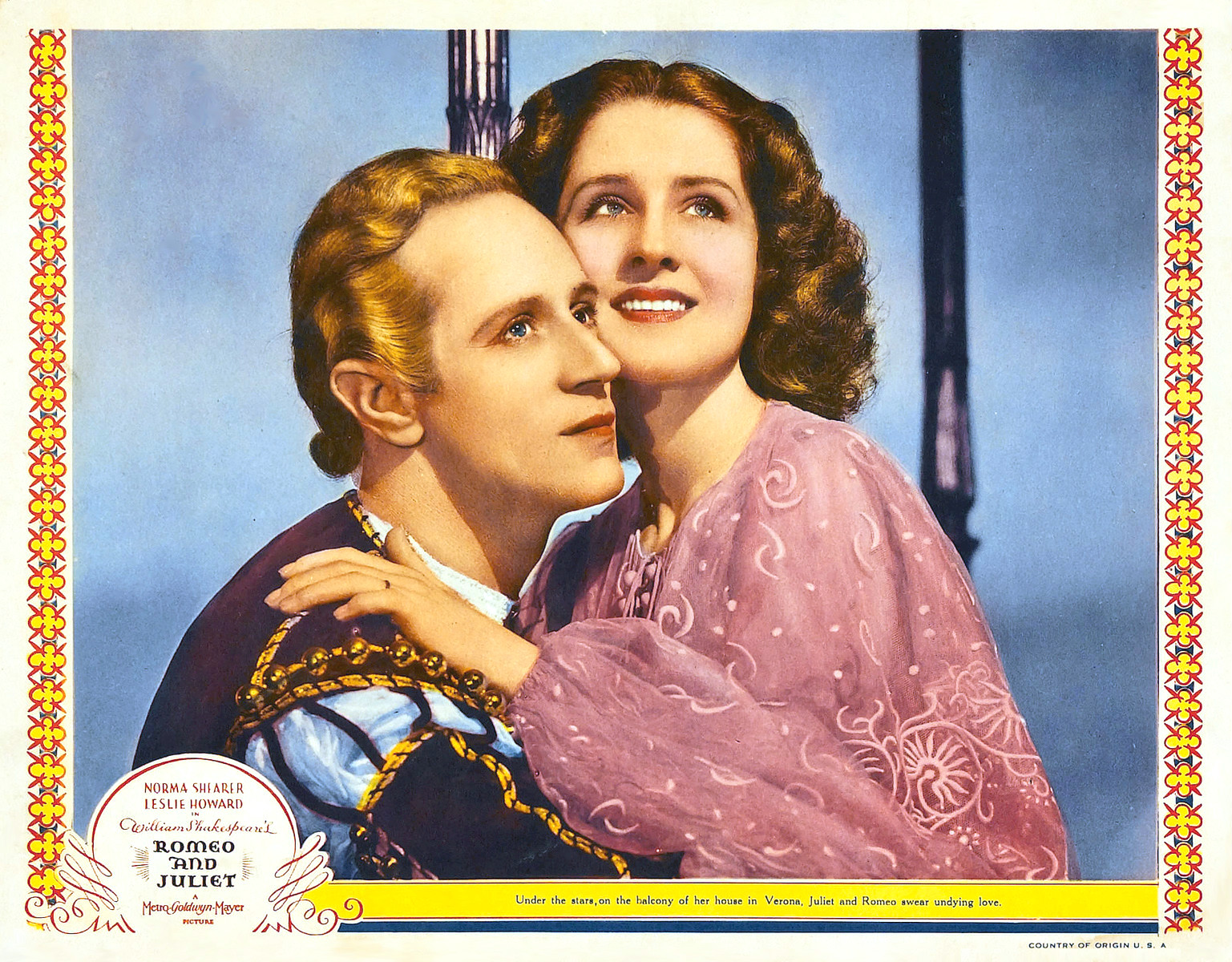
Romeo and Juliet Lobby card, Leslie Howard and Norma Shearer (1936)

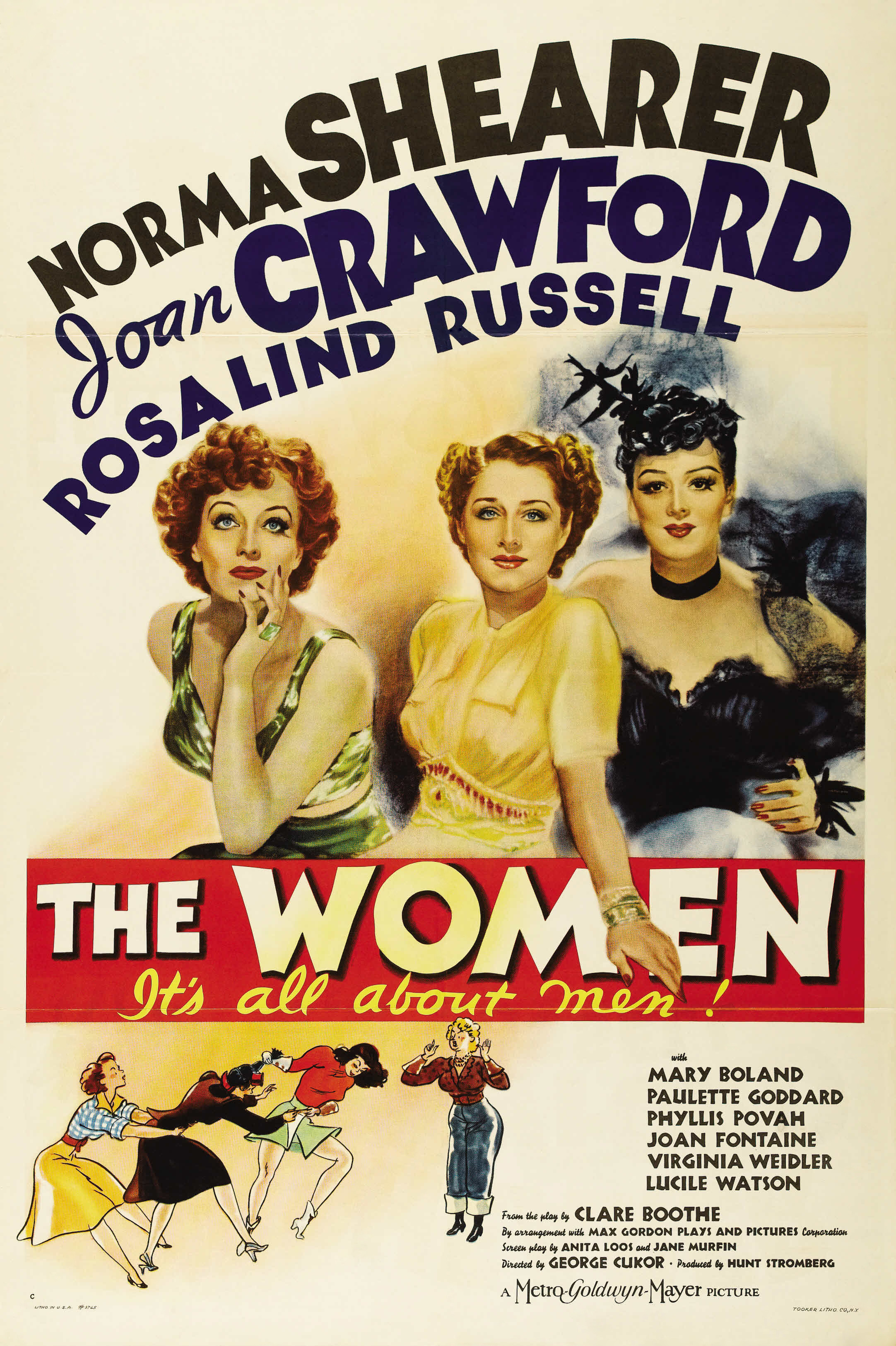
Poster for The Women (1939)

Norma Shearer sound films
Title	Year	Role	Notes	Ref(s)
Voices Across the Sea	1928	Herself (with other celebrities)	MGM short Telephone call for the opening of Loew's Empire Theatre in London, and premiere of Alias Jimmy Valentine	
The Trial of Mary Dugan	1929	Mary Dugan	MGM	
The Last of Mrs. Cheyney	1929	Mrs. Fay Cheyney	MGM	
The Hollywood Revue of 1929	1929	Herself as Juliet	MGM	
Their Own Desire	1929	Lolly	MGM	
The Divorcee	1930	Jerry Martin	MGM; Academy Award for Best Actress	
Let Us Be Gay	1930	Kitty Brown	MGM	
Jackie Cooper's Christmas Party	1931	Herself	MGM	
Strangers May Kiss	1931	Lisbeth Corbin	MGM	
A Free Soul	1931	Jan Ashe	MGM/Loew's, Inc.	
Private Lives	1931	Amanda Prynne	MGM	
The Stolen Jools	1931	Herself	Released in the UK as The Slippery Pearls. National Variety Artists	
Strange Interlude	1932	Nina Leeds Evans	MGM	
Smilin' Through	1932	Kathleen Moonyean Clare	MGM	
Hearst Metrotone News	1933	Herself	Home from vacation abroad	
Riptide	1934	Lady Mary Rexford	MGM/Loew's, Inc.	
The Barretts of Wimpole Street	1934	Elizabeth Barrett	Loew's Inc., MGM	
Romeo and Juliet	1936	Juliet Capulet	MGM; Copyright register and world premiere 1936; released generally 1937	
Mr. Will Shakespeare	1936	Herself	MGM; Film short to publicize Romeo and Juliet	
Marie Antoinette	1938	Marie Antoinette	MGM	
Hollywood Goes to Town	1938	Herself	MGM; World premiere of Marie Antoinette	
Idiot's Delight	1939	Irene	MGM	
The Women	1939	Mrs. Stephen Haines, Mary	MGM	
Escape	1940	Countess Ruby von Treck	MGM	
Good Neighbor Day in Movieland - Hollywood, California	1941	Herself	Hearst production footage	
We Were Dancing	1942	Vicki Wilomirska	MGM	
Her Cardboard Lover	1942	Consuelo Croyden	MGM	
Anniversary	1963	Herself and other Canadians in the film industry	Documentary celebrating Canadian contributions to cinema	

== Bibliography ==
- Quirk, Lawrence J. (1988). Norma : The Story of Norma Shearer (1st ed.). New York: St. Martin's Press. ISBN 0-312-01798-7.
- Sassen, Claudia (2015). Larry Semon, Daredevil Comedian of the Silent Screen: A Biography and Filmography. McFarland. ISBN 978-0-7864-9822-2.
