= Next Time We Love =

1936 film by Edward H. Griffith

- Directed by: Edward H. Griffith
- Screenplay by: Melville Baker
- Based on: Next Time We Live 1935 novel by Ursula Parrott; Say Goodbye Again 1934-5 in McCall's by Ursula Parrott
- Produced by: Paul Kohner
- Starring: Margaret Sullavan; James Stewart; Ray Milland; Grant Mitchell; Robert McWade; Anna Demetrio; Ronald Cosby
- Cinematography: Joseph A. Valentine
- Edited by: Ted J. Kent
- Music by: Franz Waxman (musical director)
- Color process: Black and white
- Production company: Universal Pictures
- Distributed by: Universal Pictures
- Release date: January 30, 1936
- Running time: 87 minutes
- Country: United States
- Language: English
- Budget: $350,000

Next Time We Love is a 1936 American melodrama film directed by Edward H. Griffith and starring Margaret Sullavan, James Stewart and Ray Milland. The adapted screenplay was by Melville Baker, with an uncredited Preston Sturges and Doris Anderson, based on Ursula Parrott's 1935 novel Next Time We Live, which was serialized before publication as Say Goodbye Again. The film is also known as Next Time We Live in the U.K.

== Plot ==
Aspiring actress Cicely Tyler marries ambitious newsman Christopher Tyler, but their life together is interrupted when he is assigned to a good position in his newspaper's Rome bureau, and she stays behind, confiding to her rich secret admirer, Tommy Abbott, that she is pregnant. Separations, reunions and reconciliations follow as Cicely and Christopher struggle to balance their romance and their careers.

== Cast ==
- Margaret Sullavan as Cicely Hunt Tyler
- James Stewart as Christopher Tyler
- Ray Milland as Tommy Abbott (as Raymond Milland)
- Grant Mitchell as Michael Jennings
- Robert McWade as Frank Carteret
- Anna Demetrio as Madame Donato
- Ronnie Cosby as Kit (as Ronald Cosbey)
- Hattie McDaniel as Hanna (uncredited)

== Production ==
Ursula Parrott was a popular novelist of the time, several of whose novels were turned into films, most prominently Ex-Wife which became the 1930 movie The Divorcee. The story which provided the source material for Next Time We Love was first serialized as Say Goodbye Again in McCall's from December 1934 to April 1935, and was then published as a novel called Next Time We Live, which was also the working title of the film. There was debate about what to call the movie, with studio executives concerned that a motion picture entitled Next Time We Live might be misinterpreted as being about reincarnation, while director Edward H. Griffith wanted to avoid losing the publicity value of using the novel's title. Although the film was released as Next Time We Love, the alternate title Next Time We Live was used for its British release.

Francis Lederer was originally cast for the part of Christopher Tyler, but was unavailable. Margaret Sullavan was responsible for suggesting her friend James Stewart might be borrowed from MGM for the part. Production on the film was delayed because Sullavan was shooting retakes for So Red the Rose, but it began on 21 October 1935 and continued through 30 December. Shooting began with only half the script written by Melville Baker, so three weeks into production, the studio put Doris Anderson on the project as well. Some scenes in the film were directed in San Francisco by assistant director Ralph Slosser using doubles, and Slosser also directed some studio scenes as well.

Next Time We Love was released at the end of January 1936.

== Critical reception ==
Frank S. Nugent of the The New York Times was critical of the choice to produce a film that was "too faithful" to the source novel as he believed it required more than a "literal translation" to make an interesting film. He was positive in his assessment of the three leading players, and wrote that they made the film "less wearisome ... Miss Sullavan does so well that she almost convinces us that Cicely is not as stupid as her actions imply. James Stewart ... promises ... to be a welcome addition to the roster of Hollywood's leading men. And Ray Milland, more likable than ever, makes us wonder about the casting system which condemns him to be always a best man, never the bridegroom."

Picturegoer’s Lionel Collier reviewed the film as "very good" and wrote "the basic outline of the story is not remarkable, but the way that it is told, is" and further described it as "novel and illuminating". The acting was praised, with Collier writing "Margaret Sullivan, whose work always seems to carry the hall-mark of sincerity, is brilliant as the shy college girl who develops into a successful actress… James Stewart also does full justice to the role of the husband … Ray Milland is good as the friend … and Robert McWade is well in character as a newspaper editor". Collier concluded by commenting, "I can thoroughly recommend the picture to all lovers of fine acting."
