= 1929 Academy Awards =

1929 Academy Awards may refer to:

- 1st Academy Awards, the Academy Awards ceremony that took place on May 16, 1929, honoring films released in 1927 and 1928
- 2nd Academy Awards, the Academy Awards ceremony that took place on April 3, 1930, honoring films released between August 1, 1928, and July 31, 1929
- 3rd Academy Awards, the Academy Awards ceremony that took place on November 5, 1930, honoring films released between August 1, 1929, and July 31, 1930
