= 3rd Academy Awards =

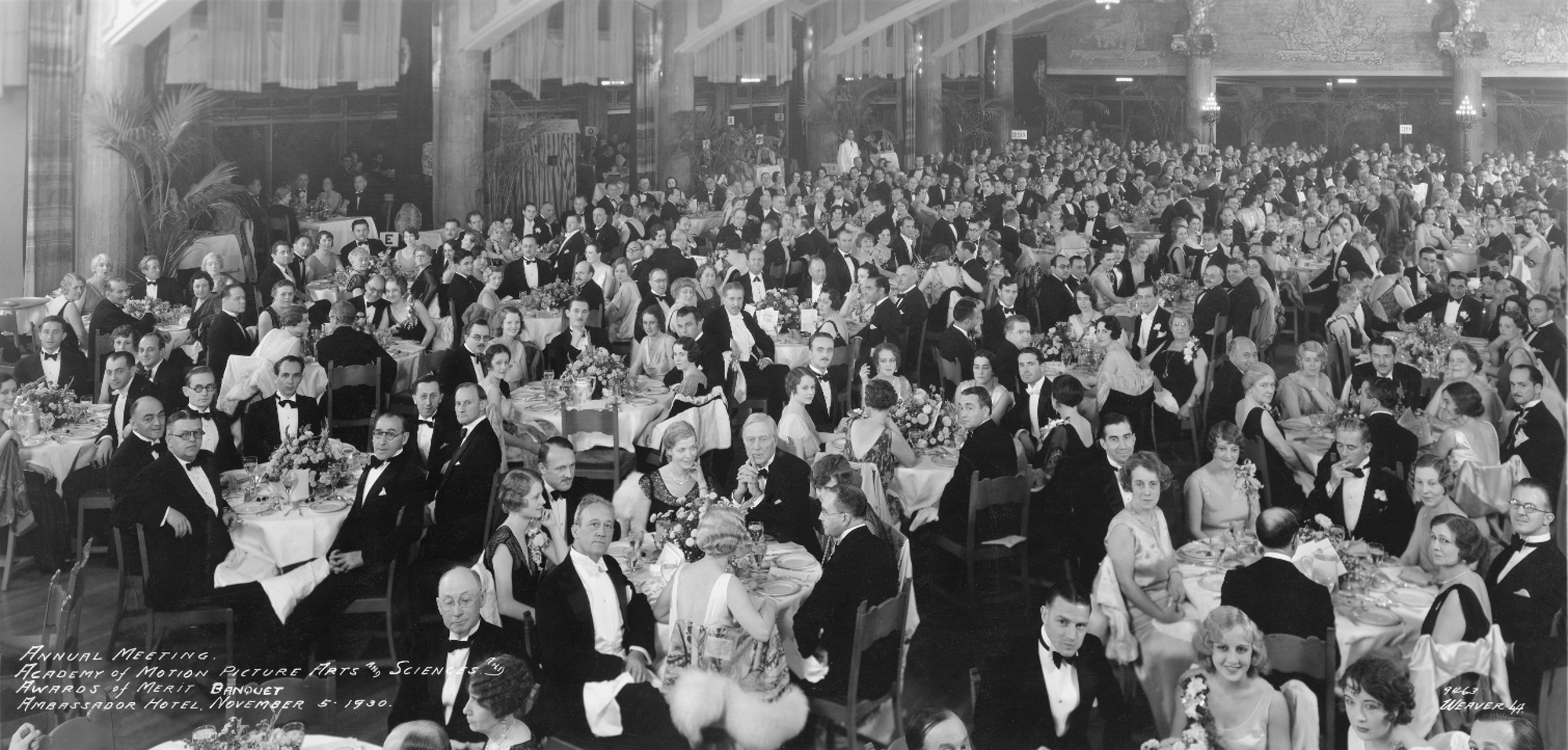
- Date: November 5, 1930
- Site: The Ambassador Hotel; Los Angeles, California
- Hosted by: Conrad Nagel

Highlights
- Best Picture: All Quiet on the Western Front
- Most awards: All Quiet on the Western Front and The Big House (2)
- Most nominations: The Love Parade (6)

The 3rd Academy Awards, featuring Conrad Nagel as the host. Three of the awards were presented in the filmed portion – Outstanding Production, Best Actress, and Best Writing.

The 3rd Academy Awards were held on November 5, 1930, by the Academy of Motion Picture Arts and Sciences (AMPAS), awarding films released between August 1, 1929, and July 31, 1930. AMPAS decided to hold the awards in November to move them closer to the eligibility period; therefore, the ceremony took place only seven months after the 2nd Academy Awards, making 1930 the only year in which two Academy Awards ceremonies were held. This was the first ceremony to be voted on by the full membership, rather than by the small clique that voted at the previous two ceremonies. The ceremony was held at the Ambassador Hotel, being attended by over 500 members of the Academy.

All Quiet on the Western Front became the first film to win both Best Picture and Best Director, which would become common in later years. Lewis Milestone became the first person to win two Oscars, having won Best Director – Comedy at the 1st Academy Awards. The Love Parade received six nominations, the greatest number of any film to that point, but did not win in any category.

Best Sound Recording was introduced this year, making it the first new category since the inception of the Oscars. It was awarded to Douglas Shearer, brother of Best Actress winner Norma Shearer, making them the first sibling winners in Oscar history. Ruth Chatterton's performance in Sarah and Son, directed by Dorothy Arzner, was the first nominee from a female-directed film.

A portion of the awards were filmed for the first time: Universal Pictures co-founder and president Carl Laemmle winning Outstanding Production for All Quiet on the Western Front, given to him by Louis B. Mayer, vice president of Metro-Goldwyn-Mayer; Norma Shearer winning Best Actress for The Divorcee, and screenwriter Frances Marion winning Best Writing for The Big House.

== Winners and nominees ==
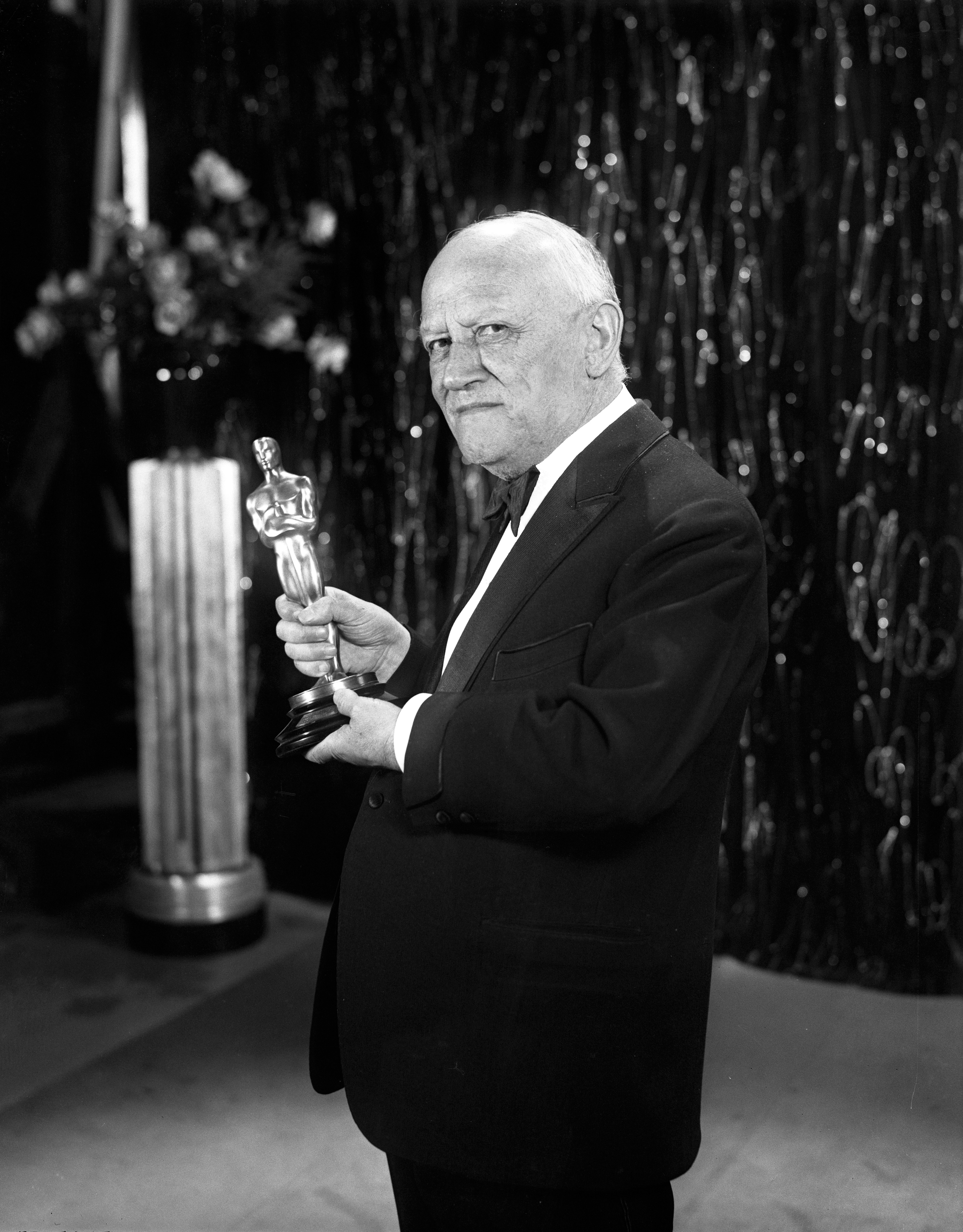
Carl Laemmle, Best Picture winner

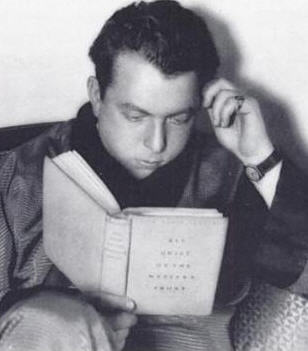
Lewis Milestone, Best Director winner

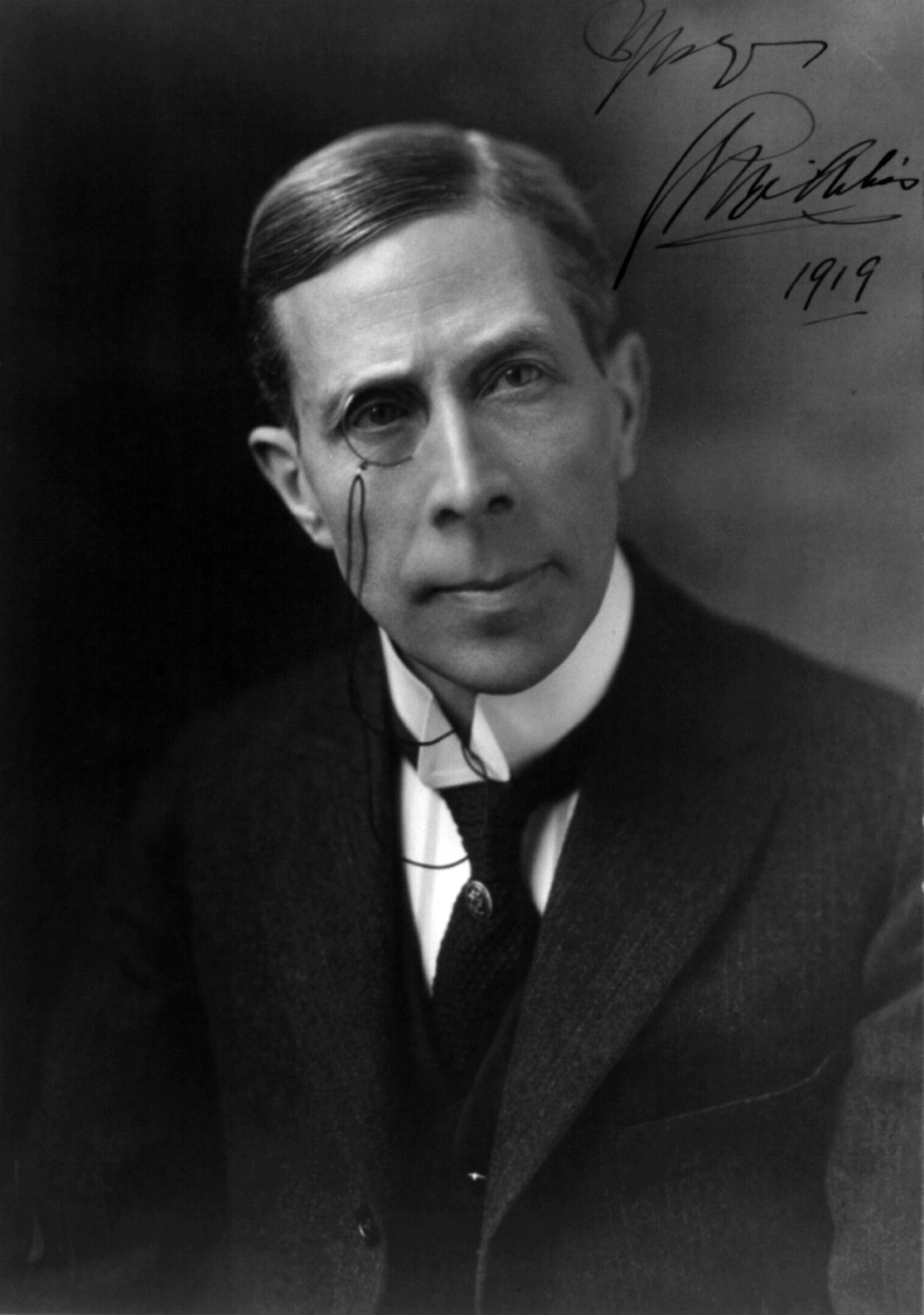
George Arliss, Best Actor winner

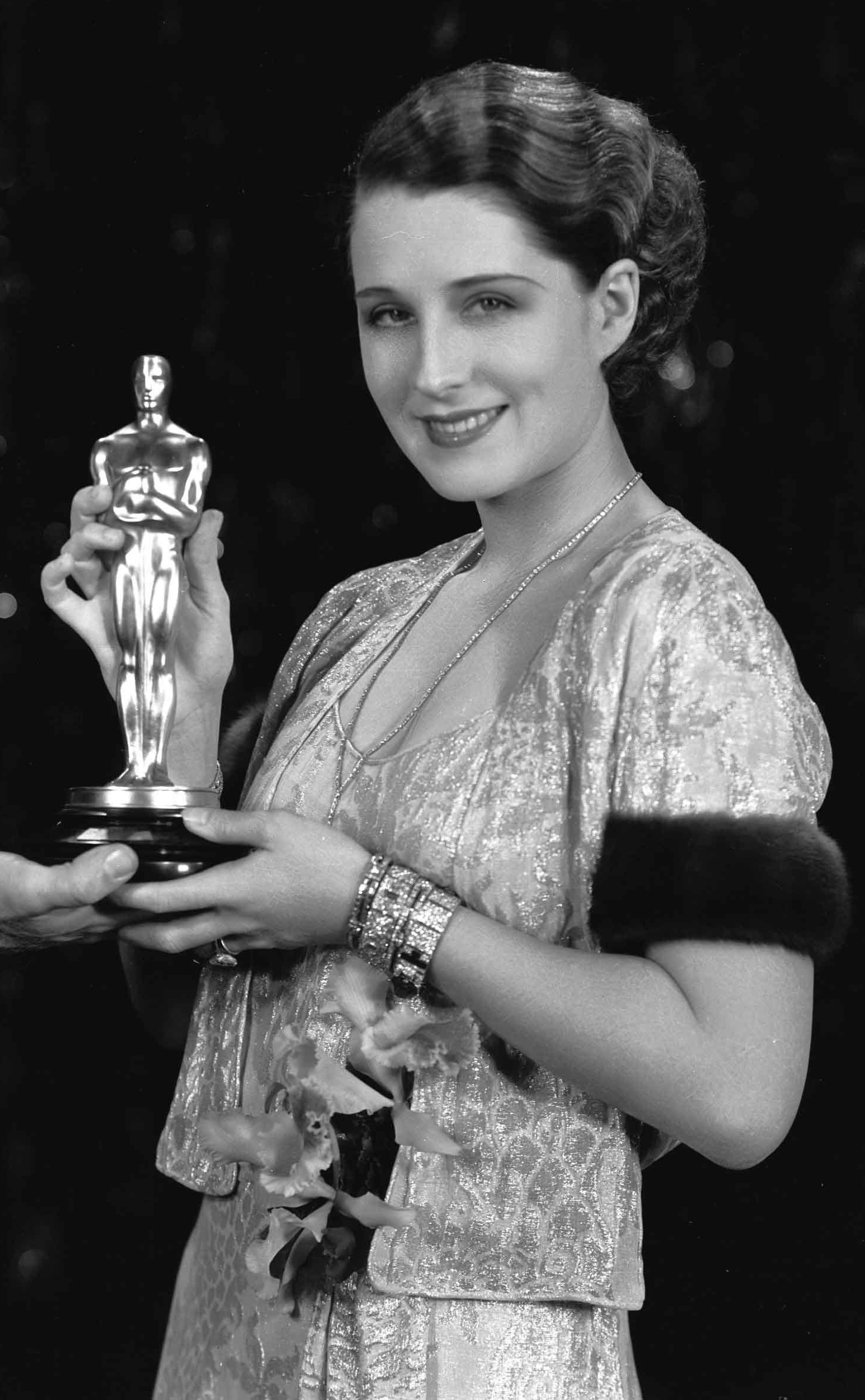
Norma Shearer, Best Actress winner

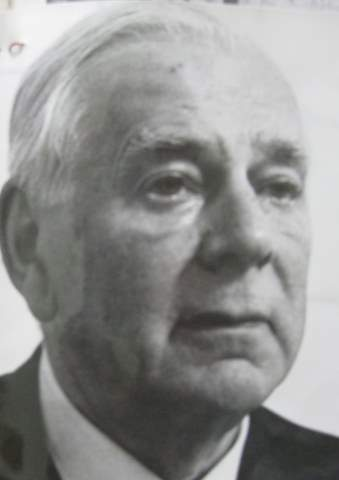
Herman Rosse, Best Art Direction winner

Nominees were announced on September 19, 1930. Winners are listed first and highlighted in boldface.

**Outstanding Production**: **All Quiet on the Western Front – Carl Laemmle, (Note: The film as produced by Carl Laemmle Jr., but the award was given to his father Carl Laemmle.) for Universal Studios**; The Big House – Irving Thalberg for Cosmopolitan; Disraeli – Jack L. Warner and Darryl F. Zanuck for Warner Bros.; The Divorcee – Robert Z. Leonard for Metro-Goldwyn-Mayer; The Love Parade – Ernst Lubitsch for Paramount Famous Lasky	**Best Directing**: **Lewis Milestone – All Quiet on the Western Front**; Clarence Brown – Anna Christie; Robert Leonard – The Divorcee; King Vidor – Hallelujah; Ernst Lubitsch – The Love Parade; Clarence Brown – Romance
**Best Actor**: **George Arliss – Disraeli as Benjamin Disraeli**; George Arliss – The Green Goddess as The Raja; Wallace Beery – The Big House as Butch; Maurice Chevalier – The Big Pond as Pierre Mirande and The Love Parade as The Count Alfred Renard; Ronald Colman – Bulldog Drummond as Hugh Drummond and Condemned as Michel; Lawrence Tibbett – The Rogue Song as Yegor	**Best Actress**: **Norma Shearer – The Divorcee as Jerry Martin**; Nancy Carroll – The Devil's Holiday as Hallie Hobart; Ruth Chatterton – Sarah and Son as Sarah Storm; Greta Garbo – Anna Christie as Anna Christie and Romance as Rita Cavallini; Norma Shearer – Their Own Desire as Lucia 'Lally' Marlett; Gloria Swanson – The Trespasser as Marion Donnell
**Best Writing**: **The Big House – Frances Marion**; All Quiet on the Western Front – George Abbott, Maxwell Anderson, and Del Andrews, based on the novel by Erich Maria Remarque; Disraeli – Julien Josephson, based on the play by Louis N. Parker; The Divorcee – John Meehan, based on the novel Ex-Wife by Ursula Parrott; Street of Chance – Howard Estabrook, based on a story by Oliver H. P. Garrett	**Best Sound Recording**: **The Big House – Douglas Shearer**; The Case of Sergeant Grischa – John E. Tribby; The Love Parade – Franklin Hansen; Raffles – Oscar Lagerstrom; Song of the Flame – George Groves
**Best Art Direction**: **King of Jazz – Herman Rosse**; Bulldog Drummond – William Cameron Menzies; The Love Parade – Hans Dreier; Sally – Jack Okey; The Vagabond King – Hans Dreier	**Best Cinematography**: **With Byrd at the South Pole – Joseph T. Rucker and Willard Van der Veer**; All Quiet on the Western Front – Arthur Edeson; Anna Christie – William Daniels; Hell's Angels – Tony Gaudio and Harry Perry; The Love Parade – Victor Milner

== Multiple nominations and awards ==
Films with multiple nominations
Nominations	Film
6	The Love Parade
4	All Quiet on the Western Front
4	The Big House
4	The Divorcee
3	Anna Christie
3	Disraeli
2	Bulldog Drummond
2	Romance

Films with multiple wins
Wins	Film
2	All Quiet on the Western Front
2	The Big House

== Gallery ==
Academy Award-winning and nominated films – 3rd Academy Awards
The full film of All Quiet on the Western Front, which won for Best Picture (then known as Outstanding Production) and for Best Directing

A near-complete version of the film Disraeli, which won George Arliss the award for Best Actor

The full film of The Divorcee, which won Norma Shearer the award for Best Actress

The full film of The Big House, which won for Best Writing and for Best Sound Recording

The full film of The Love Parade, which was nominated for six awards but did not win any.

== See also ==
- 1929 in film
- 1930 in film
