= 1930 Academy Awards =

1930 Academy Awards may refer to:

- 2nd Academy Awards, the Academy Awards ceremony that took place April 3, 1930, honoring films released between August 1, 1928, and July 31, 1929
- 3rd Academy Awards, the Academy Awards ceremony that took place November 5, 1930 honoring films released between August 1, 1929, and July 31, 1930
- 4th Academy Awards, the Academy Awards ceremony that took place November 10, 1931 honoring films released between August 1, 1930, and July 31, 1931
