= Arnold Zweig =

German writer (1887–1968)

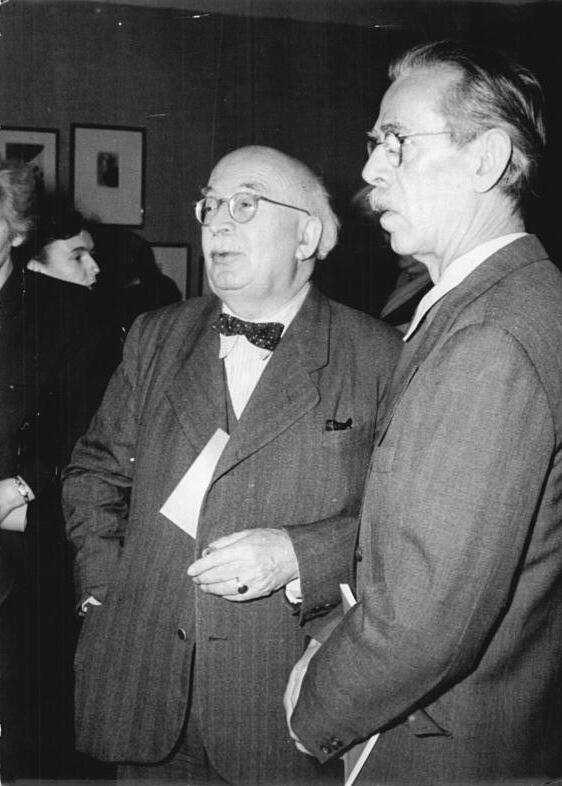
- Arnold Zweig (left) with Otto Nagel
- Born: Arnold Zweig; 10 November 1887; Glogau, Silesia, Prussia, German Empire
- Died: 26 November 1968 (aged 81); East Berlin, East Germany
- Occupation: writer

Arnold Zweig (German: [tsvaɪk]; 10 November 1887 – 26 November 1968) was a German writer, pacifist, and socialist.

== Early life and education ==
Zweig was born in Glogau, Prussian Silesia (now Głogów, Poland), the son of Adolf Zweig, a Jewish shipping agent and harness maker, and his wife Bianca. (He is not related to Stefan Zweig.) After attending a science-oriented gymnasium in Kattowitz (now Katowice), between 1907 and 1914 he studied several branches of the humanities, history, philosophy and literature, at several universities – Breslau (now Wrocław), Munich, Berlin, Göttingen, Rostock and Tübingen. He was especially influenced by Friedrich Nietzsche's philosophy. His first literary works, Novellen um Claudia (1913) and Ritualmord in Ungarn, gained him wider recognition.

== World War One ==
Zweig volunteered for the German army in World War I and served as a private in France, Hungary and Serbia. He was stationed in the Western Front at the time when Judenzählung (the Jewish census) was administered in the German army. Shaken by the experience, he wrote in his letter dated 15 February 1917, to Martin Buber: "The Judenzählung was a reflection of unheard sadness for Germany's sin and our agony. ... If there was no antisemitism in the army, the unbearable call to duty would be almost easy." He began to revise his views on the war and came to view the war as one that pitted Jews against Jews. Later he described his experiences in the short story Judenzählung vor Verdun. The war changed Zweig from a Prussian patriot to an eager pacifist.

In 1917, Zweig was assigned to the Press department of the German Army Headquarters in Kaunas, Lithuania where he was introduced to the East European Jewish organizations.

In a quite literal effort to put a face to the hated 'Ostjude' (Eastern European Jew), due to their Orthodox, economically depressed, "unenlightened", "un-German" ways, Zweig published with the artist Hermann Struck Das ostjüdische Antlitz (The Face of East European Jewry) in 1920. This was a blatant effort to at least gain sympathy among German-speaking Jews for the plight of their eastern European compatriots. With the help of many simple sketches of faces, Zweig supplied interpretations and meaning behind them.

After World War I Zweig was an active socialist Zionist in Germany. After Hitler's attempted coup in 1923 he went to Berlin and worked as an editor of a newspaper, the Jüdische Rundschau.

== 1920–1933 ==
In the 1920s, Zweig became attracted to the psychoanalytical theories of Sigmund Freud and underwent Freudian therapy. In March 1927 he wrote to Freud asking permission to dedicate his new book to him. In his letter Zweig told Freud: "I personally owe to your psychological therapy the restoration of my whole personality, the discovery that I was suffering from a neurosis and finally the curing of this neurosis by your method of treatment." Freud replied with a warm letter, and their correspondence continued for a dozen years, a momentous period in Germany's history. Their correspondence was published in book form.

In 1927 Zweig published the anti-war novel The Case of Sergeant Grischa, which made him an international literary figure, with the English version selected in the USA as a Book of the Month title. The theme of his sequence of World War I fiction is that Germany was perverted by brutal men who shifted the purpose of the war from defence to conquest. Major contestants in this struggle are characters in his books. Some, like Kaiser Wilhelm II, Field Marshal von Hindenburg, and commander on the Eastern Front during the last two years of the war Prince Leopold of Bavaria, are named. Others are masked, but would have been easily identified by many readers at the time: for example, General Ludendorff is "Schieffenzahn", the politician Matthias Erzberger is "Deputy Hemmerle", General Max Hoffmann is "Clauss", and Field Marshal von Eichhorn is "von Lychow".

From 1929 he was a contributing journalist of socialist newspaper Die Weltbühne (World Stage). That year, Zweig would attend one of Hitler's speeches. He told his wife that the man was a Charlie Chaplin without the talent. In 1933, Zweig witnessed the destruction of his books in the Nazi book burning. He remarked that the crowds "would have stared as happily into the flames if live humans were burning." He decided to leave Germany that night.

== Exile in Palestine ==
When the Nazi Party took power in Germany in 1933, Zweig was one of many Jews who immediately went into exile. Zweig went first to Czechoslovakia, then Switzerland and France. After spending some time with Thomas Mann, Lion Feuchtwanger, Anna Seghers and Bertolt Brecht in France, he set out for Palestine, or Mandatory Palestine, then under British rule.

In Haifa, Palestine, he published a German-language newspaper, the Orient. This was not received well by Zionist activists, who insisted on Hebrew-only publications and went so far as to bomb the newspaper's office, which resulted in the newspaper's shutdown. In Palestine, Zweig became close to a group of German-speaking immigrants who felt distant from Zionism and viewed themselves as refugees or exiles from Europe, where they planned to return. This group included Max Brod, Else Lasker-Schüler and Wolfgang Hildesheimer. To help with finances he also wrote occasionally for the German language newspaper, Yediot Hadashot. During his years in Palestine, Zweig returned to socialism.

In Haifa, Zweig underwent psychoanalysis with Ilja Shalit. His novels De Vriendt Goes Home and A Costly Dream are partly set in Mandatory Palestine and describe, among other things, the encounter between Zionism, socialism and psychoanalysis. In De Vriendt Goes Home, a young Zionist, recently immigrated to Palestine from Eastern Europe, kills the Dutch Jew De Vriendt who, on the basis of a more orthodox religious sentiment, was seeking an understanding with the local Arab population. During his stay in Palestine, Zweig may have been the main link between Freud and the local psychoanalytic community. In 1935, Education Before Verdun, the third novel of Zweig's cycle The Great War of the White Men came out and, like its predecessor The Case of Sergeant Grischa it was translated into many languages, and, once more, the US edition became a Book of the Month selection for 1936.

Zweig's 1947 novel The axe of Wandsbek is based upon the Altona Bloody Sunday (in German: Altonaer Blutsonntag) riot which resulted from the march by the Sturmabteilung, the original paramilitary wing of the Nazi Party, in Altona on 17 July 1932. The march turned violent and resulted in 18 people being shot dead, including four Communists including Bruno Tesch who were beheaded for their alleged involvement in the riot. An East German film, The Axe of Wandsbek, was later made about the riot and was adapted from Zweig's novel. The authorised version of the film, which was 20 minutes shorter than the original, was screened in 1962, in honour of Zweig's 75th birthday.

== East Germany ==
In 1948, after a formal invitation from the East German authorities, Zweig decided to return to the Soviet occupation zone in Germany (which became East Germany in 1949). In East Germany he was in many ways involved in the communist system. He was a member of parliament, delegate to the World Peace Council Congresses and the cultural advisory board of the communist party. He was President of the DDR Academy of Arts, Berlin from 1950 to 1953.

He was rewarded with many prizes and medals by the regime. The USSR awarded him the Lenin Peace Prize (1958) for his anti-war novels. He was nominated for the Nobel Prize in Literature seven times.

After 1962, due to poor health, Zweig virtually withdrew from the political and artistic fields. Arnold Zweig died in East Berlin on 26 November 1968, aged 81.

== Bibliography ==
- Claudia. Translated by Sutton, Eric. London: M. Secker. 1930.
- Die Bestie. Munich: Albert Langen. 1914.
- Ritualmord in Ungarn jüdische Tragödie in fünf Aufzügen. Berlin: Hyperionverlag. 1914.
- The face of East European Jewry. Translated by Isenberg, Noah (2nd ed.). Berkeley, California: University of California Press. 2004 [originally 1922]. ISBN 0-520-21512-5.
- Playthings of time. Translated by Ashton, Emma D. London: Martin Secker. 1935.
- Der große Krieg der weißen Männer [The Great War of the White Men] - a cycle in six parts
  - The case of Sergeant Grischa. Translated by Sutton, Eric. New York: The Viking Press. 1928.
  - Young woman of 1914. Translated by Sutton, Eric. New York: The Viking Press. 1932.
  - Education before Verdun. Translated by Sutton, Eric. New York: The Viking Press. 1936.
  - Outside Verdun. Translated by Rintoul, Fiona. Glasgow: Freight Books. 2014. ISBN 978-1-908754-52-3.
  - The crowning of a king. Translated by Sutton, Eric. New York: The Viking Press. 1938.
  - Die Feuerpause [The Ceasefire], 1954.
  - The time is ripe. Translated by Banerji, Kenneth; Wharton, Michael. London: Anthony Biggs & Phillips. 1962 [originally 1957].
- De Vriendt goes home. Translated by Sutton, Eric. New York: The Viking Press. 1933.
- The living thoughts of Spinoza. Translated by Katz, Eric; Barrows Mussey, June; Elwes, R.H.M. London: Cassell and Company. 1939.
- The axe of Wandsbek. Translated by Sutton, Eric. New York: The Viking Press. 1947 [originally 1943].
- Freud, Ernst L., ed. (1970). The letters of Sigmund Freud & Arnold Zweig.
- Traum ist Teuer [A Costly Dream], Aufbau Verlag, 1962.

== Film adaptations ==
- The Case of Sergeant Grischa (1930), US film directed by Herbert Brenon. This film is presumed lost, as no negative or print material is known to have survived.
- The Axe of Wandsbek (1951), directed by Falk Harnack, produced in East Germany.
- Der Streit um den Sergeanten Grischa (1968), directed by Helmut Schiemann as a TV film in two parts for the East German broadcaster Deutscher Fernsehfunk.
- Junge Frau von 1914 (1970), East German film directed by Egon Günther.
- Education Before Verdun (1973), East German TV miniseries directed by Egon Günther
- The Axe of Wandsbek (1982), a West German TV film docudrama directed by Heinrich Breloer and Horst Königstein.

== See also ==
- List of peace activists

== Sources ==
- Elon, Amos (2002), The Pity of it All: A History of Jews in Germany 1743-1933, New York: Metropolitan Books
