= Strangers May Kiss =

1931 film

- Directed by: George Fitzmaurice(uncredited)
- Written by: John Meehan
- Based on: Strangers May Kiss; 1930 novel by Ursula Parrott
- Produced by: Louis B. Mayer; Irving Thalberg
- Starring: Norma Shearer
- Cinematography: William H. Daniels
- Edited by: Hugh Wynn
- Distributed by: Metro-Goldwyn-Mayer
- Release date: April 4, 1931
- Running time: 81 minutes
- Country: United States
- Language: English

Strangers May Kiss is a 1931 American pre-Code drama film produced and released by Metro-Goldwyn-Mayer and noncredit-directed by George Fitzmaurice. The movie stars Norma Shearer, Robert Montgomery and Neil Hamilton. The movie was an adaptation of the book Strangers May Kiss, which was written by Ursula Parrott.

== Plot ==
Lisbeth is a proud, glamorous, sexy woman whose core beliefs about love and marriage revolve around the idea of freedom. She falls in love with a newspaper reporter named Alan, who agrees that their relationship should remain friendly and physical. Steve, her childhood friend who is very much in love with her, watches from afar as Lisbeth is with other men, but wants her to be happy.

Her relationship with Alan soon becomes difficult. Lisbeth's aunt Celia firmly believes that love and marriage are intertwined, saying that "marriage and love are not enemies. A woman doesn't know how to be in love until she's been married ten years." Unfortunately for her, she soon finds out that her husband has been cheating on her. After much contemplation, she commits suicide by jumping out of her apartment window.

Alan, shocked by what happened, is afraid that Lisbeth will love him the same way that Celia loved her husband. As a result, he simply leaves for a month, not telling Lisbeth where he is going or when he will be back. Lisbeth tries to shake it off but quickly forgives Alan when he comes back. Alan takes her to Mexico for a vacation, where they are happy for some time. However, he later tells her that he has to leave for a new assignment in China and that he didn't plan on taking her with him. He leaves her even more heartbroken when he tells her that he has a wife back at his home and that he shouldn't get too comfortable with their relationship.

Instead of returning home, she decides to travel to Europe for two years and "have fun", becoming so promiscuous that she develops a reputation throughout Paris. One day, Steve tracks her down with the intention of marrying her. On that same day, Alan calls to tell her that he divorced his wife and was coming to see her in person, which obviously makes her happy. However, he quickly learns about her sexual past and leaves her again, still heartbroken. Lisbeth returns to New York and years later runs into Alan at the theater one night. Alan tells Lisbeth that he has forgiven her and once again, Lisbeth goes running right back to him.

== Cast ==
=== Main cast ===
- Norma Shearer as Lisbeth
- Robert Montgomery as Steve
- Neil Hamilton as Alan
- Marjorie Rambeau as Geneva
- Irene Rich as Celia
- Hale Hamilton as Andrew
- Conchita Montenegro as Spanish Dancer
- Jed Prouty as Harry
- Albert Conti as De Bazan
- Henry Armetta as Waiter
- George Davis as Waiter

=== Unbilled ===
- Robert Livingston
- André Cheron as Headwaiter
- Bess Flowers as Dining Extra
- Wilbur Mack as Diner with Andrew
- Chris-Pin Martin as Mexican
- Ray Milland as Third Admirer
- Sandra Morgan as Dining Companion
- Karen Morley as Dining Companion
- Edward J. Nugent as Second Admirer
- Lee Phelps as Bartender
- Kane Richmond as First Admirer
- Jack Trent as Silent Admirer
