= A Free Soul =

1931 film directed by Clarence Brown

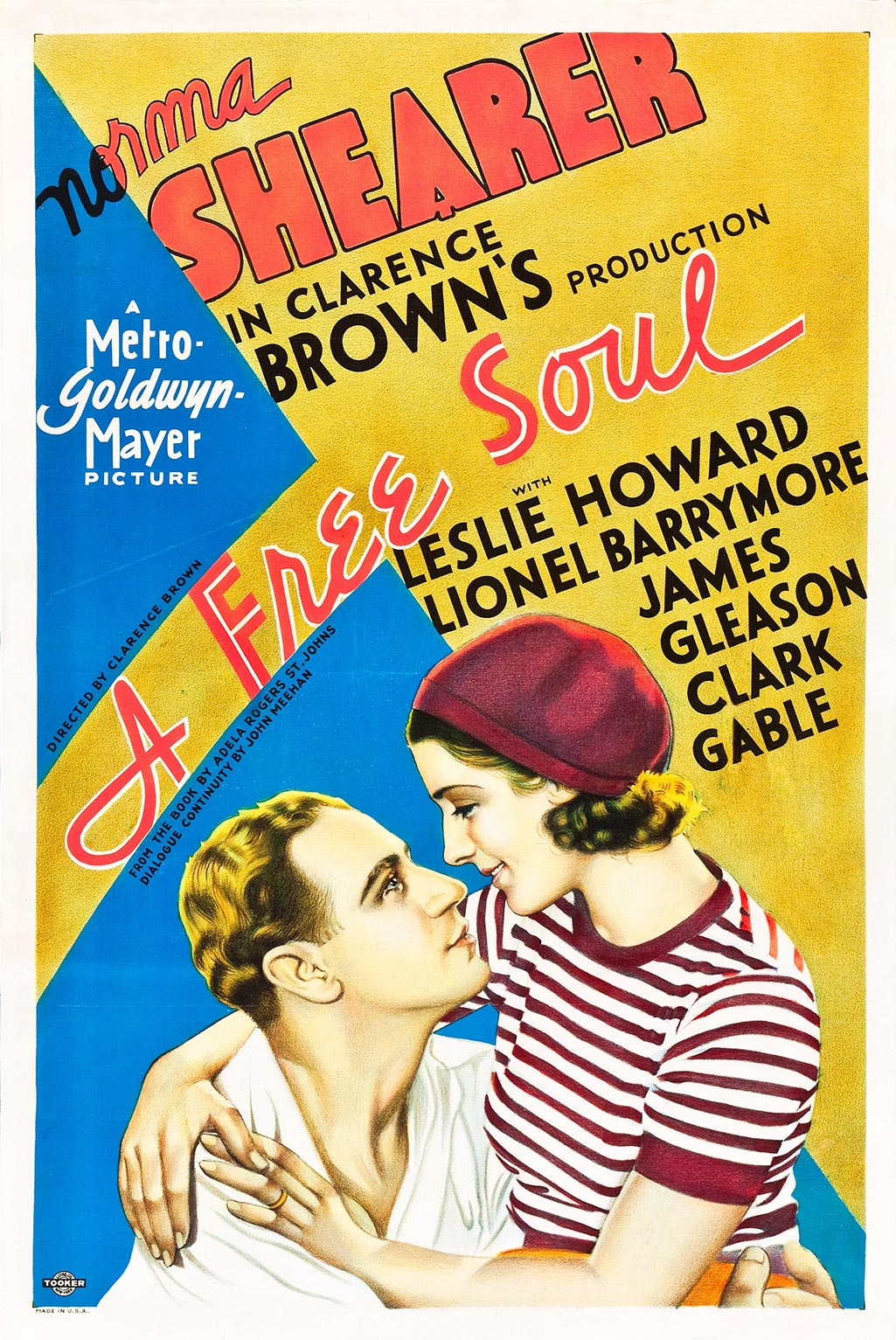
- theatrical release poster
- Directed by: Clarence Brown
- Written by: Dialogue continuity: John Meehan; Adaptation: Becky Gardiner (Uncredited: Philip Dunning; Dorothy Farnum; John Lynch)
- Based on: A Free Soul (1927 novel) by Adela Rogers St. Johns (Uncredited: A Free Soul (1928 play) by Willard Mack)
- Produced by: Clarence Brown
- Starring: Norma Shearer; Leslie Howard; Lionel Barrymore; James Gleason; Clark Gable
- Cinematography: William Daniels
- Edited by: Hugh Wynn
- Production company: Metro-Goldwyn-Mayer
- Distributed by: Loew's Inc.
- Release dates: June 2, 1931 (NYC); June 20, 1931 (US)
- Running time: 91 minutes
- Country: United States
- Language: English
- Budget: $529,000
- Box office: $1.4 million

A Free Soul is a 1931 American pre-Code drama film directed by Clarence Brown, starring Norma Shearer, and featuring Leslie Howard, Lionel Barrymore, James Gleason, and Clark Gable. The film became famous for Barrymore's climactic courtroom monologue, and he won the Academy Award for Best Actor for his performance. Gable made such an impression in the role of a gangster who bullies Shearer that he was catapulted from supporting player to leading man.

== Plot ==
In San Francisco, Jan Ashe is very close to her father, Stephen, who raised her by himself, as her mother died in childbirth. However, Stephen's upper-class family has all but disowned him and his free-spirited daughter, Jan, due to his alcoholism and her free spirited willfulness.

A skilled defense lawyer, Stephen successfully defends gangster Ace Wilfong from a false murder charge, despite his knowledge of Ace's gambling operations and other illegal activities. Jan is engaged to clean-cut polo-player Dwight Winthrop, but their relationship is threatened when she meets Ace and becomes enamored of him and his exciting life.

As Stephen continues to slip deeper into alcoholism, Jan breaks her engagement with Dwight and begins a clandestine affair with Ace that grows into love. At his illicit casino, Ace asks a drunken Stephen if he can marry Jan, but Stephen, offended by the request, angrily refuses, and when Stephen discovers Jan in Ace's boudoir, he takes her home. Father and daughter have an argument over their respective vices, and Jan proposes a deal: she will never see Ace again, if Stephen will stop drinking. Although he is unsure if he can keep his promise, Stephen agrees, and the two leave for a camping vacation, along with Stephen's loyal assistant Eddie.

After three months of sobriety, Stephen buys a bottle of liquor and boards a train for an unknown destination. Jan returns home to find that her family has cut ties with her, and, feeling despondent, visits Ace. She is surprised by his angry and possessive attitude, and finally realizes what sort of man he really is. He informs her that they are going to be married the next day, but she sneaks away. Ace follows Jan to her apartment and tells her that she must marry him, but they are interrupted by the arrival of Dwight. Undeterred, Ace says he will make Jan unfit for Dwight to marry by spreading word of his sexual liaisons with her, and threatens that, if Dwight marries Jan anyway, Ace will have Dwight killed.

Dwight goes to Ace's casino and shoots Ace. He immediately turns himself in to the police, but, to protect Jan's reputation, says he killed Ace over a gambling debt, even though this means he will likely be executed. Jan finds Stephen in a flophouse, seriously ill from his drinking binge, and brings him to Dwight's trial. Over the objections of Dwight and the prosecuting attorney, Stephen places Jan on the witness stand and elicits the full details of her relationship with Ace and the true reason for the murder. In an emotional speech to the jury, Stephen takes the blame for everything that happened, explaining that, because of his alcoholism, he had failed to be a proper father to Jan until it was too late. Stephen then collapses to the floor, dead.

Dwight is acquitted, and, as Jan prepares to leave for a new life in New York, promises to follow her.

== Cast ==
- Norma Shearer as Jan Ashe
- Leslie Howard as Dwight Winthrop, Jan's upper-class fiancé
- Lionel Barrymore as Stephen Ashe, Jan's father, and a successful defense attorney
- Clark Gable as Ace Wilfong, a gangster
- James Gleason as Eddie, Stephen's streetwise assistant
- Lucy Beaumont as Grandma Ashe
- Claire Whitney as Aunt Helen (uncredited)
- William Stack as Dick Roland (uncredited)
- Roscoe Ates as the man shot at in the men's room at the roadside hamburger joint (uncredited)
- E. Alyn Warren as Bottomley, Ace's butler (uncredited)
- Edward Brophy as Slouch, a member of Ace's gang (uncredited)
- Frank Sheridan as the prosecuting attorney at Dwight's trial (uncredited)
- George Irving as Dwight's defense attorney (uncredited)
- Edward LeSaint as the judge (uncredited)

== Production ==
A Free Soul was written by John Meehan (dialogue continuity) and Becky Gardiner (adaptation), based on the 1928 play of the same title by Willard Mack, which was itself an adaptation of the 1927 novel of the same title by Adela Rogers St. Johns. The novel was initially published serially in Hearst's International combined with Cosmopolitan magazine from September 1926 to February 1927. Although the onscreen credits list only the book by St. Johns, contemporary reviews list both the novel and Mack's play.

== Reception ==
In a contemporary review for The New York Times, critic Mordaunt Hall wrote:

Talking pictures are by no means elevated by the presentation of 'A Free Soul' ... Nevertheless, it should be stated that Lionel Barrymore does all that is possible with his role. In fact, his is the only characterization that rings true, the other players being handicapped either through miscasting, the false conception of human psychology or poorly written lines. Norma Shearer may be the star of this film, but Mr. Barrymore steals whatever honors there may be. ... Undoubtedly all the members of the cast have ability, but the doings in this film benefit but little by their talents, except, as has been set forth, through Mr. Barrymore's portrayal. And even he has to compete with tremendous odds to be convincing.

The film was successful at the box office. According to MGM records, it earned $889,000 in the U.S. and Canada, and $533,000 in other markets, resulting in a profit of $244,000.

== Awards and honors ==
4th Academy Awards:

Wins

- Best Actor: Lionel Barrymore

Nominations

- Best Directing: Clarence Brown
- Best Actress: Norma Shearer

== Home media ==
On March 8, 2008, Warner Home Video released A Free Soul (on the same disc as 1930's The Divorcee, also starring Shearer) as part of a DVD box set of five pre-Code films called "Forbidden Hollywood Collection, Vol. 2".

== See also ==
- Lionel Barrymore filmography
- Norma Shearer filmography
- Clark Gable filmography
