= Love Affair (1932 film) =

1932 film by Thornton Freeland

- Film poster
- Directed by: Thornton Freeland
- Written by: Jo Swerling; Dorothy Howell
- Based on: Love Affair; 1930 story in College Humor by Ursula Parrott
- Starring: Dorothy Mackaill; Humphrey Bogart
- Cinematography: Ted Tetzlaff
- Edited by: Jack Dennis
- Color process: Black and white
- Production company: Columbia Pictures
- Distributed by: Columbia Pictures
- Release date: March 17, 1932
- Running time: 68 minutes
- Country: United States
- Language: English

Love Affair is a 1932 American pre-Code romance film based on Ursula Parrott's short story of the same name. The film is directed by Thornton Freeland and produced by Columbia Pictures. Love Affair follows an adventurous socialite (Dorothy Mackaill), who is in love with an aviation designer (Humphrey Bogart). (Note: Bogart would play an aviator in four features: Body and Soul (1931), China Clipper (1937), Passage to Marseille (1944) and Chain Lightning (1950).)

== Plot ==
Wealthy socialite Carol Owen decides to take up flying. Gilligan sets her up with a homely instructor, but she requests dashing Jim Leonard instead. Jim has some fun, taking her through some aerobatic maneuvers that leave her queasy, but still game. For revenge, she gives him a lift into town in her sports car, driving at breakneck speeds. They begin seeing each other.

Carol learns that Jim is designing a revolutionary aircraft engine, but cannot get any financial backing. She decides to give him a secret helping hand, persuading her skeptical financial manager, Bruce Hardy, to invest in the project. Hardy is only too pleased to oblige, as he has asked Carol numerous times to marry him.

Hardy keeps a mistress on the side, aspiring stage actress Linda Lee. Unbeknownst to him, she is Jim's sister and in love with Georgie Keeler, a Broadway producer. Things become serious between Carol and Jim. He begins neglecting his work and eventually spends the night with her. The next day, he asks her to marry him. She realizes that she is distracting him from making a success of his engine and turns him down.

When Hardy asks Carol once again to marry him, she jokingly tells him she would only consider his offer if she were broke. He then informs her that she is. He has been paying all her bills for the past year. Hoping to help Jim, she agrees to wed Hardy.

Hardy tries to break off his relationship with Linda. This is what Georgie has been waiting for. He has coached Linda to extort $50,000 from Hardy to finance a new play in which Linda will star, but the businessman will only write her a check for $10,000. To try to pressure Hardy, Georgie has Linda lie to Jim about the relationship.

Meanwhile, Carol has second thoughts and goes to break the news to Hardy. Before she can, Jim shows up and insists that Hardy marry his sister. When Hardy shows him the canceled $10,000 check endorsed to Georgie, Jim realizes Linda has deceived him. He apologizes and leaves.

Carol decides to kill herself by crashing an aircraft. As she starts to take off, Jim reads the suicide note she left with Gilligan. He manages to cling to the fuselage, works his way gingerly to the cockpit (while the aircraft is in flight), and reconciles with Carol.

== Cast ==
- Dorothy Mackaill as Carol Owen
- Humphrey Bogart as Jim Leonard
- Hale Hamilton as Bruce Hardy
- Halliwell Hobbes as Kibbee
- Astrid Allwyn as Linda Lee
- Jack Kennedy as Gilligan
- Bradley Page as Georgie Keeler
- Barbara Leonard as Felice
- Harold Minjir as Antone

== Production ==
Principal photography on Love Affair began on December 22, 1931, and wrapped on January 15, 1932.

The aircraft used in Love Affair included:

- Buhl Bull Pup LA-1
- Travel Air 2000 c/n 288, NC3670
- Travel Air 9000 c/n 381, NC4421
- Waco ATO c/n A-45, NC9554

== Reception ==
Variety in a contemporary review of Love Affair was not impressed, calling it "Tame romantic film fare hardly providing Dorothy Mackaill with an opportunity commensurate with her talents...bought for double bill purposes, that is about its worth," but also noting "Some exceptional stunt flying is involved in the final stretch of celluloid. Sound reproduction and photography up to standard."
