= The Case of Sergeant Grischa =

1927 novel by Arnold Zweig

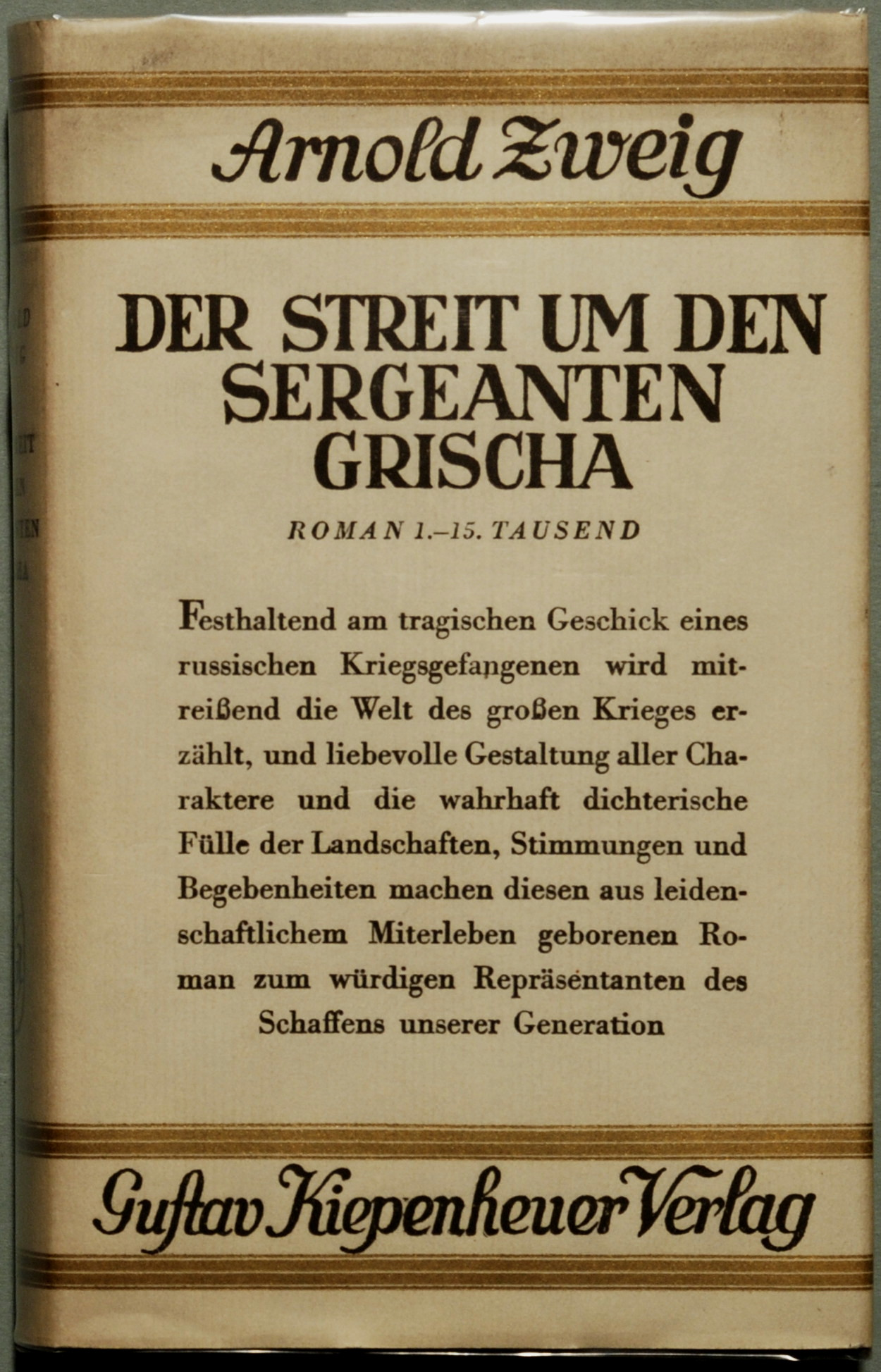
- First print (1927)
- Author: Arnold Zweig
- Original title: Der Streit um den Sergeanten Grischa
- Language: German
- Genre: War novel; Satire
- Publisher: 1927

The Case of Sergeant Grischa (1927) is a war novel by the German writer Arnold Zweig. Its original German title is Der Streit um den Sergeanten Grischa. It is part of Zweig's hexalogy Der große Krieg der weißen Männer (The great war of white men). It was part of the so-called "war book boom" of the late 1920s, during which many veterans of the First World War turned their memories and experiences into semi-autobiographical novels. The first English edition was published in 1928.

The book is a satire, focusing on the way in which innocent men are sacrificed in war, one irony being that the authorities spend more time and energy on the niceties of Grischa's case than they do on trying to save their own soldiers from their fate. Some major actors in the war are feebly disguised: General Ludendorff is "Schieffenzahn", and Field Marshal von Eichorn is "von Lychow".

The first film based on the novel was created in 1930 in the USA; a second one was made in Germany in 1968. East German television aired a mini-series based on the novel in 1970.

== Plot ==
The Russian soldier Grischa escapes from a German prison camp and attempts to return to the family home. After his escape he becomes involved with a group of outlaws, including a young woman, Babka, who dresses as a man and has been prematurely aged by her traumatic experiences. Grischa and Babka become lovers. When he leaves, she gives him the identity tag of a former lover, Bjuscheff, so that if he gets caught he will be mistaken for a deserter and not be sent back to the prison camp. She follows him at a distance in case he ever needs her help.

Grischa is eventually captured. Being illiterate, he does not realise that calling himself Bjuscheff worsens his plight, as he has been unable to read the notices saying that all deserters must hand themselves in to the occupying German army within three days or face execution as spies. Only when he is condemned to death does he realise what has happened, and he reveals his true identity. The local German authorities send for his former prison guards, and having confirmed his true identity, they send for advice to Schieffenzahn, the chief administrator on the eastern Front. Schieffenzahn orders that the original error must be ignored, for the sake of discipline. Grischa is therefore sentenced to be shot.

There follows a power struggle between the local military authorities and the administrators. The old general sees it as a point of honour not to give in to Schieffenzahn's order. Although he fails to convince Schieffenzahn face to face, the latter thinks better of it afterwards and rescinds the execution order. However, a heavy snowfall has brought down the communication wires, and the telegram of reprieve is never sent. In the meantime, Babka hatches a plan to poison the prison guards, whilst Lieutenant Winfried, the general's nephew, tries to find alternative ways of getting Grischa out of prison. Both plans fail because Grischa himself is tired of the struggle and refuses to leave, preferring to face execution rather than continue as a pawn in the larger game.
