= Ursula Parrott =

American writer (1900–1957)

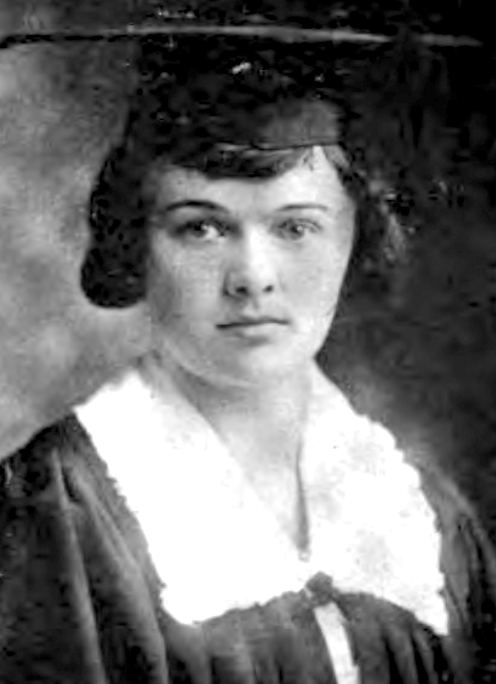
- Ursula Parrott, from the 1920 yearbook of Radcliffe College
- Born: Katherine Ursula Towle; March 26, 1899; Dorchester, Boston, Massachusetts, United States
- Died: September 1957 (aged 58); New York City, United States
- Education: Girls' Latin School; Radcliffe College
- Spouses: Lindesay Marc Parrott Sr. (m. 1922; div. 1928) Charles Terry Greenwood (m. 1931; div. 1932) John J. Wildberg Jr. (m. 1934, div)) Alfred Coster Schermerhorn (m. 1939; div. 1944)
- Children: Lindesay Marc Parrott Jr.
- Writing career
- Language: English

Ursula Parrott (March 26, 1899 – September 1957), was a prolific modern novelist, screenwriter, and short story writer whose sensational first novel, Ex-Wife (1929), was a Jazz Age bestseller. Adapted for film as The Divorcee, it starred Norma Shearer. Exploring divorce, abortion, infidelity, changing ideas about marriage, and the disastrous effects of the new morality on women, Ex-Wife created a scandal because of its frank depiction of young working women in a New York City drenched in cocktails and Scotch. From 1930 to 1936, Parrott sold the rights to eight novels and stories that were made into films.

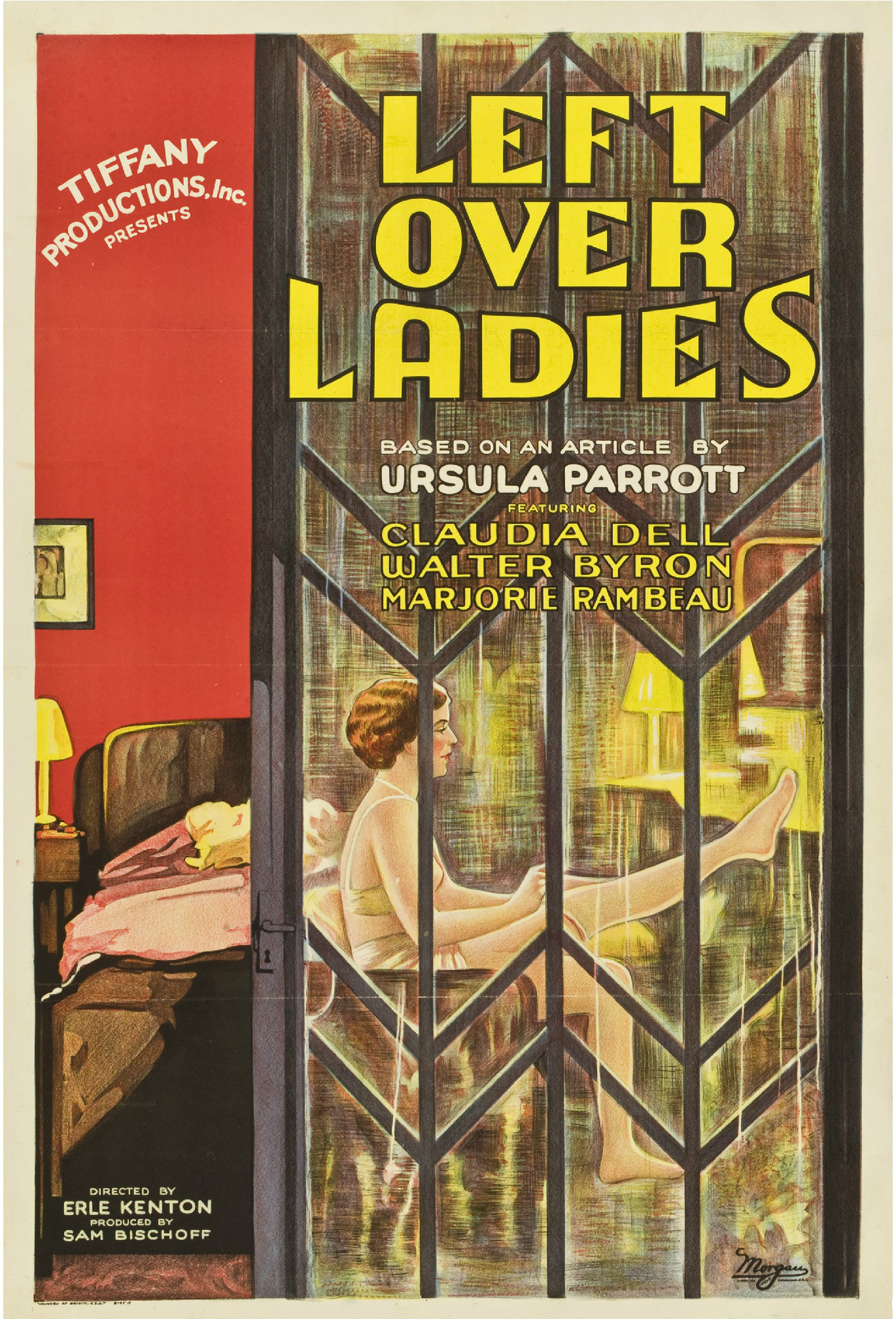
Poster for Left Over Ladies (1931), based on an article by Ursula Parrott

During her lifetime, her works fell into obscurity, only to be revived when Ex-Wife was republished in 1988 and 2023 (paperback), garnering considerable attention in The New York Times, The New Yorker, the Paris Review and other prestigious publications. Amy Helmes and Kim Askew of the “Lost Ladies of Lit Podcast” linked the book favorably to Mary McCarthy's The Group, Rona Jaffe's The Best of Everything and even F. Scott Fitzgerald's masterworks The Great Gatsby and Tender Is The Night.

The title of author Lyz Lenz's 2003 nonfiction divorce memoir, This American Ex-Wife: How I Left My Marriage and Started My Life, is an homage to Ex-Wife. Her podcast "Remembering the Original-Ex-Wife" honors Parrott for chronicling the devastating consequences of divorce for women.

== Personal life ==
Ursula Parrott was born Katherine Ursula Towle in Dorchester, Massachusetts. Her father, Henry Charles Towle, was a doctor and her mother was Towle's second wife, Mary Catherine Flusk, who also gave birth to Ursula's older sister, Lucy Inez Towle. Towle's first wife, Elizabeth Mooney, had died shortly after giving birth to a daughter, Margaret. Parrott's older half-sister would later adopt the name Madge Tyrone. Mary's two daughters adored her, but she was of frail health and died when both were still young.

Parrott attended Girls Latin School in Boston and Radcliffe College, a small women's liberal arts college in Cambridge, Massachusetts. After graduating in 1920 with a degree in English, she moved to Greenwich Village, where, the same year, she met Lindesay Marc Parrott.

In 1922, Ursula married Parrott, then a reporter for The New York Times. Two years later, they had a son named Lindesay Marc Parrott Jr., called Marc. However, Lindesay did not want a child and, in one commonly told story, Marc's existence was kept a secret. According to the tale, it was not until 1924 that Lindesay found out that he was a father. He then denied the existence of the child.

A different, if still confusing story, emerges in the 21st-century biography Becoming the Ex-Wife: The Unconventional Life and Forgotten Writings of Ursula Parrot. Ursula did conceal her pregnancy at first, most likely to prevent her husband from pressuring her to terminate it. She chose to have the baby in her hometown of Boston where she had the support of the Irish domestic who had raised her. After the birth, she left her baby in the care of her father and sister Lucy in Boston. She and Lindesay attempted to patch up their marriage. But it ended after less than six years, with infidelities on both sides, paralleling the plot of Ursula's forthcoming novel, Ex-Wife.

After Lindesay left her, Ursula found herself a single mother and the family breadwinner, although Lindesay did pay child support. Even the success of Ex-Wife in 1929 must have seemed a mixed blessing since her beloved father died in 1930, only a year after publication. Still, she made an astonishing amount of money, churning out advertising copy, short stories, novels and screenplays. She saw her son often, paid his boarding school expenses, bought him a horse and many other gifts, traveled with him, and put him through Harvard.

Ursula married three other men: Charles T. Greenwood, a prominent New York banker, in 1934; John Wildberg, an attorney, in 1937; and Air Force Major Coster Schermerhorn (grandson of Charles Coster) in 1945. She ran in high literary circles and was even rumored to have had an affair with F. Scott Fitzgerald. Her biography makes no such claim. It does note that Fitzgerald was happy to work on the screenplay of Infidelity, based on one of Ursula's short stories.

In December 1942, Parrott made headlines when she was brought up on federal charges of attempting to help jazz guitarist Michael Neely Bryan escape from the Miami Beach Army stockade. At the trial, she was found innocent. There was another arrest over $1,000 worth of silverware taken from a house where she was a guest. That, too, blew over. "Although she'd published twenty-two books and over fifty stories, the New York Times still reminded its audience of her identity by saying she was the author of Ex-Wife," noted Paris Review critic Michael LePointe in 2019.

Famous for reckless spending, especially on fashionable clothes, and plagued by the heavy drinking and smoking typical of the Jazz Age, Parrott died of cancer in the charity ward of a New York hospital in 1957 at the age of 58.

Lindesay Parrott outlived his ex-wife. He apparently did not get to know his son, Marc. A well-known foreign correspondent, he had a small obituary in The New York Times in 1987.

In 1988, Marc Parrott, a retired schoolteacher and librarian, died in Honolulu at the age of 64. He left behind his wife, two sons, and a grandchild. He had written a rueful, affectionate afterword to the republication of Ex-Wife, which astonished him, since it had been so long forgotten, vividly describing his mother's workaholic lifestyle.

== Career ==
Parrott's Ex-Wife, her first novel, was published anonymously in 1929.

An overnight success, it sold more than 100,000 copies in nine editions. The New York Mirror’s serialization of the “book everybody is talking about” coincided with the stock market crash and the start of the Great Depression. MGM paid $20,000 for the film rights; the novel was adapted for film as The Divorcee (1930) starring Norma Shearer, who also starred in an adaptation of Strangers May Kiss, published in 1930. In 1936, Parott's novel Next Time We Live was adapted for film as Next Time We Love.

Financially, Parrott was most successful between 1929 and 1940, during which she became a sought-after Hollywood screenwriter, wrote more novels, and many short stories. Her son estimated that she earned around $700,000 ($16.1 million in 2025 dollars) during that period of time.

Like Fitzgerald, Parrott’s popularity peaked in the Jazz Age, fell into decline, and then enjoyed a great second act. "Her biography salvages and reconstructs Parrott’s many remains, rescuing an important American voice and cultural figure from near oblivion," wrote Alan Sobsey in the Los Angeles Review of Books, in 2023.

== Novels ==
- Ex-Wife, Jonathan Cape & Harrison Smith (1929); re-issued with a foreword by Alissa Bennett and afterword by Marc Parrott, New York: McNally Editions, (2023) ISBN 978-1-946022-56-1
- Strangers May Kiss, Johnathan Cape & Harrison Smith (1930)
- Love Goes Past, Jonathan Cape & Harrison Smith (1931)
- The Tumult and the Shouting, Longman Green (1933)
- Dream Without Ending, Longman Green (1935)
- For All Our Lives, Dodd, Mead (1938)
- Heaven's Not Far Away, Dodd, Mead (1942)
- Navy Nurse, Dodd, Mead (1943)
- Even In One Hundred Years, (1944)

== Film adaptations ==
- Next Time We Love
- There's Always Tomorrow (1956 film)
- The Divorcee
- Strangers May Kiss
- Love Affair (1932 film)
