= The Case of Sergeant Grischa (film) =

1930 film

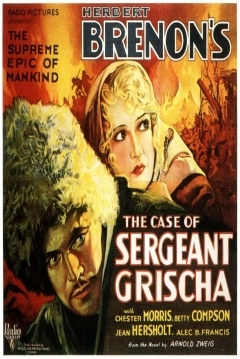
- Film Poster
- Directed by: Herbert Brenon; Ray Lissner (assistant)
- Written by: Elizabeth Meehan
- Based on: The Case of Sergeant Grischa by Arnold Zweig
- Produced by: William LeBaron
- Starring: Chester Morris; Betty Compson; Jean Hersholt; Alec B. Francis
- Cinematography: J. Roy Hunt
- Edited by: Marie Halvey
- Production company: RKO Radio Pictures
- Distributed by: RKO Radio Pictures
- Release date: March 23, 1930
- Running time: 82 minutes
- Country: United States
- Language: English
- Budget: $467,000
- Box office: $456,000

The Case of Sergeant Grischa is a 1930 American pre-Code drama film directed by Herbert Brenon, based on the German novel of the same name by Arnold Zweig. John Tribby was nominated for an Academy Award for Best Sound Recording. No known copy of this film exists and is considered lost, the only sound film to have been nominated for an Oscar and subsequently suffered this fate.

== Plot ==
Sergeant Grischa Paprotkin of the Imperial Russian Army has been captured by the Imperial German Army during World War I, and is interned in a prisoner-of-war camp. When he has a chance to escape, he takes it, and ends up staying with a young Russian refugee, Babka. However, after sometime, he longs to return to his home in Russia. Babka, even though she has fallen in love with him, agrees to help him. Since he cannot travel under his real name, being an escaped POW, Babka obtains the credentials of a dead Russian soldier, Bjuscheff.

After leaving Babka's, on his way back to his home in Russia, he stops at a friend of Babka's, who lives in Mervinsk. When a German soldier arrives at the house, Grischa hides in the basement. As he is about to leave, the soldier notices the Russian soldier's cap which Grischa has dropped on his way to the cellar. Grischa is captured, after which it is discovered his false identity is that of a Russian spy, leading to him being sentenced to execution.

While in captivity, Grischa's real identity is uncovered, but the German command refuses to reverse his sentence. Babka and her friends make plans to help him escape once again, at the same time as a powerful general in the German army, von Lychow, hears about his case and decides to intercede on his behalf. Grischa refuses the help of Babka, putting his trust with von Lychow. When von Lychow meets with the German Commander-in-Chief, General Schieffenzahn, they argue over Grischa's case, von Lychow pleading for leniency, while Schieffenzahn wanting the execution to go forward as soon as possible. They end their argument without an agreement, but after von Lychow departs, Schieffenzahn changes his mind and sends an order to cancel the execution. However, a storm has caused the wires to be down, and the message never arrives. Grischa is executed by firing squad.

== Cast ==
As per AFI:

- Chester Morris as Sergeant Grischa Paprotkin
- Betty Compson as Babka
- Alec B. Francis as General von Lychow
- Gustav von Seyffertitz as General Schieffenzahn
- Jean Hersholt as Posnanski
- Leyland Hodgson as Lieutenant Winfried (as Layland Hodgson)
- Paul McAllister as Corporal Sacht (as Paul MacAllister)
- Raymond Whitaker as Aljoscha
- Bernard Siegel as Verressjeff
- Frank McCormack as Captain Spierauge / Kolja
- Percy Barbette as Sergeant Fritz
- Hal Davis as Birkholz

== Reception ==
The film lost an estimated $170,000. Mordaunt Hall, The New York Times film critic, gave the film a mediocre review. John E. Tribby received an Oscar nomination for Best Sound for this film.
