= Ex-Wife (Ursula Parrott) =

1929 novel by Ursula Parrott

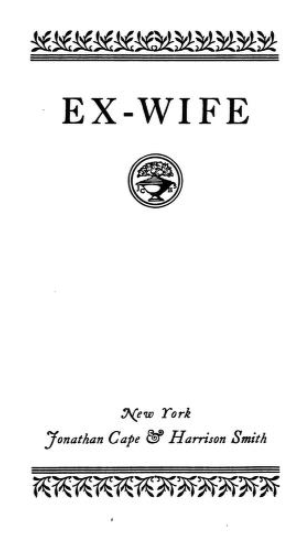
- Title page for Ex-Wife (1929)
- Author: Ursula Parrott
- Subject: Adultery Fiction, Divorce Fiction, Divorced women Fiction, Nineteen twenties Fiction, Self-realization in women Fiction
- Genre: Novel
- Published: 1929, 1930, 1989, 2023
- Publisher: J. Cape & H. Smith [1929]; Grosset & Dunlap [1930]; New American Library [1989]; McNally Editions [2023].
- Publication place: United States
- Media type: Print, E-book, Audio
- Pages: 210+
- ISBN: 9781946022561 9781946022578
- OCLC: 1347428967
- Website: Publisher's website

Ex-Wife is a 1929 novel written by Ursula Parrott and reissued by McNally Editions in 2023 with an afterword by Marc Parrott, the author's son, and a foreword by Alissa Bennett, a writer for the Paris Review.

== About the book ==
The book was a commercial success in 1929, and it maintained its success throughout the depression era 1930s, but fell out of print. It was reissued in 1989 and again in 2023. It was originally published anonymously "to underscore the salaciousness of its material." Shortly after the book’s publication, the media began hunting for the author's identity, and whether the protagonist’s portrayal was actually fictional, somewhat autobiographical or was critiquing a culture undergoing tectonic shifts. By August 1929, the year of this book's publication, the successful sleuthing revealed the author to be "Katherine Ursula Parrott, a journalist and fashion writer..."

The book also became a movie, The Divorcee, starring Norma Shearer, who won an Oscar for her role.

== Synopsis ==
A young woman named Patricia finds herself in the ambiguous space between marriage and divorce. The novel is set in New York City during the Jazz Age, and it explores the themes of female independence, sexual liberation, and the changing social mores of the time. A thread that runs throughout the story for Patricia is profound loss resulting in loneliness. After Patricia's open marriage fails, alcohol induced binges, multiple one night stands, and affairs become a mainstay. There is also the cultural dissonance between Victorian morality, carried into the new century, and the emerging sexual freedom that encompasses the permissibility of casual sex. Also, as a distraction from her devastating losses, Patricia "buys clothes she can’t afford; she gets facials and has her hair done; she listens to songs on repeat while wearily wondering why heartache always seems to bookend love."
