= Willard Van der Veer =

American cinematographer (1894–1963)

- Born: August 23, 1894; Brooklyn, New York, USA
- Died: June 16, 1963 (aged 68); Encino, California, USA
- Occupation: Cinematographer
- Years active: 1930-1963

Willard Van der Veer (August 23, 1894 – June 16, 1963) was an American cinematographer who won an Academy Award at the 3rd Academy Awards for Best Cinematography for the film With Byrd at the South Pole with Joseph T. Rucker. He started his career as a documentary cameraman and later did a couple episodes of Maverick and the film The Crawling Hand. Mount Van der Veer was named after him. He is the father of Frank Van der Veer, a Hollywood visual effects artist who founded Van Der Veer Photo Effects and won, in 1977, a Special Achievement Academy Award for the 1976 version of King Kong (this Oscar was shared with Carlo Rambaldi and Glen Robinson).

== Selected filmography ==
- With Byrd at the South Pole (1930)
- The Crawling Hand (1963)
