= With Byrd at the South Pole =

1930 film

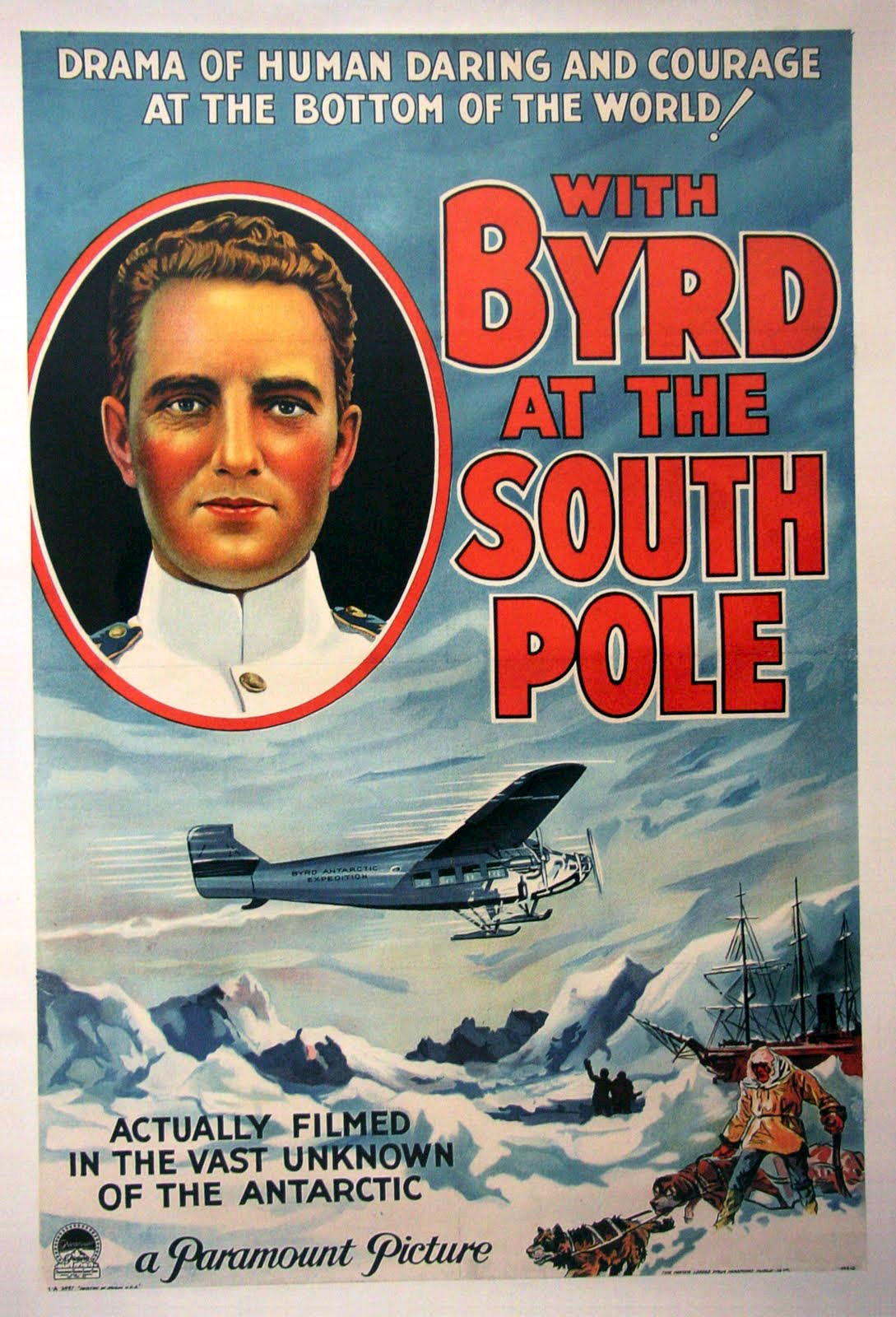
- Theatrical release poster
- Directed by: Julian Johnson
- Written by: Julian Johnson (titles)
- Produced by: Jesse L. Lasky; Adolph Zukor
- Starring: Richard E. Byrd
- Cinematography: Joseph T. Rucker; Willard Van der Veer
- Edited by: Emanuel Cohen
- Music by: Manny Baer
- Distributed by: Paramount Pictures
- Release date: June 19, 1930
- Running time: 82 minutes
- Country: United States
- Languages: Sound (Part-Talkie); English Intertitles

With Byrd at the South Pole (1930) is a part-talkie documentary film about Rear Admiral Richard E. Byrd and his first expedition to the South Pole beginning at the Little America-Exploration Base. In addition to sequences with audible dialogue or talking sequences, the film features a synchronized musical score and sound effects along with English intertitles. The dialogue sequences consist mainly of narration by Floyd Gibbons.

The film won the Academy Award for Best Cinematography at the 3rd Academy Awards. It was the first documentary to win any Oscar and is the only one to win cinematography.

== DVD release ==
With Byrd at the South Pole was released on DVD in February 2000. It is part of a Milestone collection that is very limited.

== See also ==
- The Lost Zeppelin (1929)
