= John Tribby =

American sound engineer (1903–1983)

- Born: October 30, 1903; Marshall County, Indiana, United States
- Died: February 1983; Roswell, New Mexico, United States
- Occupation: Sound engineer
- Years active: 1929 – 1951

John Tribby (October 30, 1903 – February 1983) was an American sound engineer. He was nominated for an Academy Award in the category Sound Recording for the film The Case of Sergeant Grischa.

== Selected filmography ==
- The Case of Sergeant Grischa (1930)
