= Joseph T. Rucker =

American cinematographer

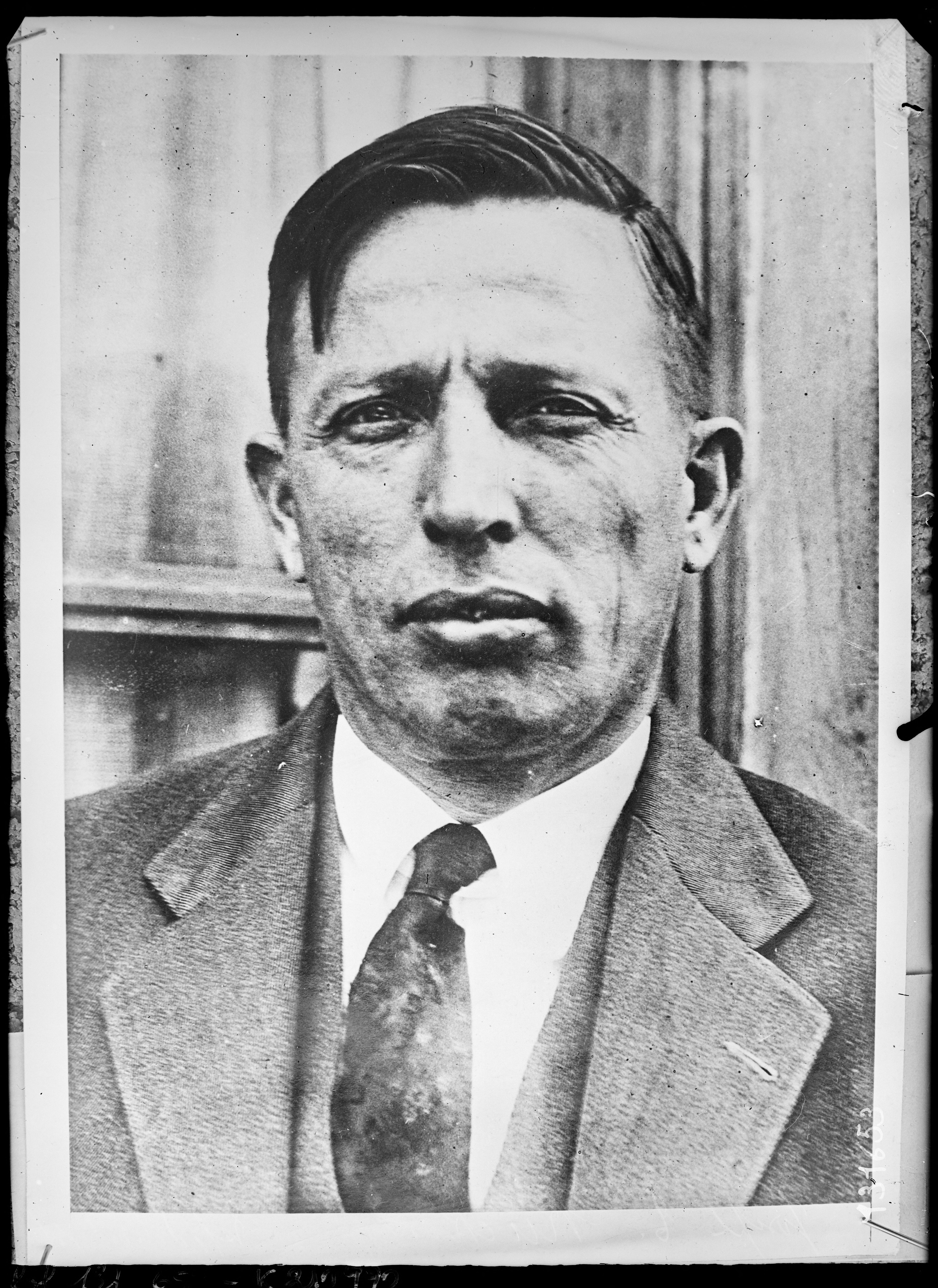
- Born: Joseph Terrell Rucker; January 1, 1887; Atlanta, Georgia, US
- Died: October 21, 1957 (aged 70); San Francisco, California, US
- Occupations: Cinematographer, News Cameraman
- Spouse: Cecile Kaufman (m. 1915)
- Children: 2

Joseph T. Rucker (January 1, 1887 – October 21, 1957) was an American cinematographer who won the Academy Award along with Willard Van der Veer at the 3rd Academy Awards in 1930 for Best Cinematography for the film With Byrd at the South Pole. He and Van der Veer won their Oscars for camera work for Admiral Byrd's 1928 and 1930 expeditions to Antarctica. In the latter expedition, he and Van der Veer brought back over 160,000 feet (49,000 m) of raw footage.

He spent 40 years of his life as a news cameraman at Paramount News and at NBC. In addition to the Byrd expeditions, he is remembered for filming the 1914 opening of the Panama Canal, the aftermath of the 1923 Tokyo earthquake, the 1927 Chinese Civil War, and World War II's Pacific conflict from the USS Enterprise (CV-6).

The Rucker Spur in Antarctica was named after him by the Advisory Committee on Antarctic Names.

== Selected filmography ==
With Byrd at the South Pole (1930)
