= The Divorcee =

1930 film by Robert Z. Leonard

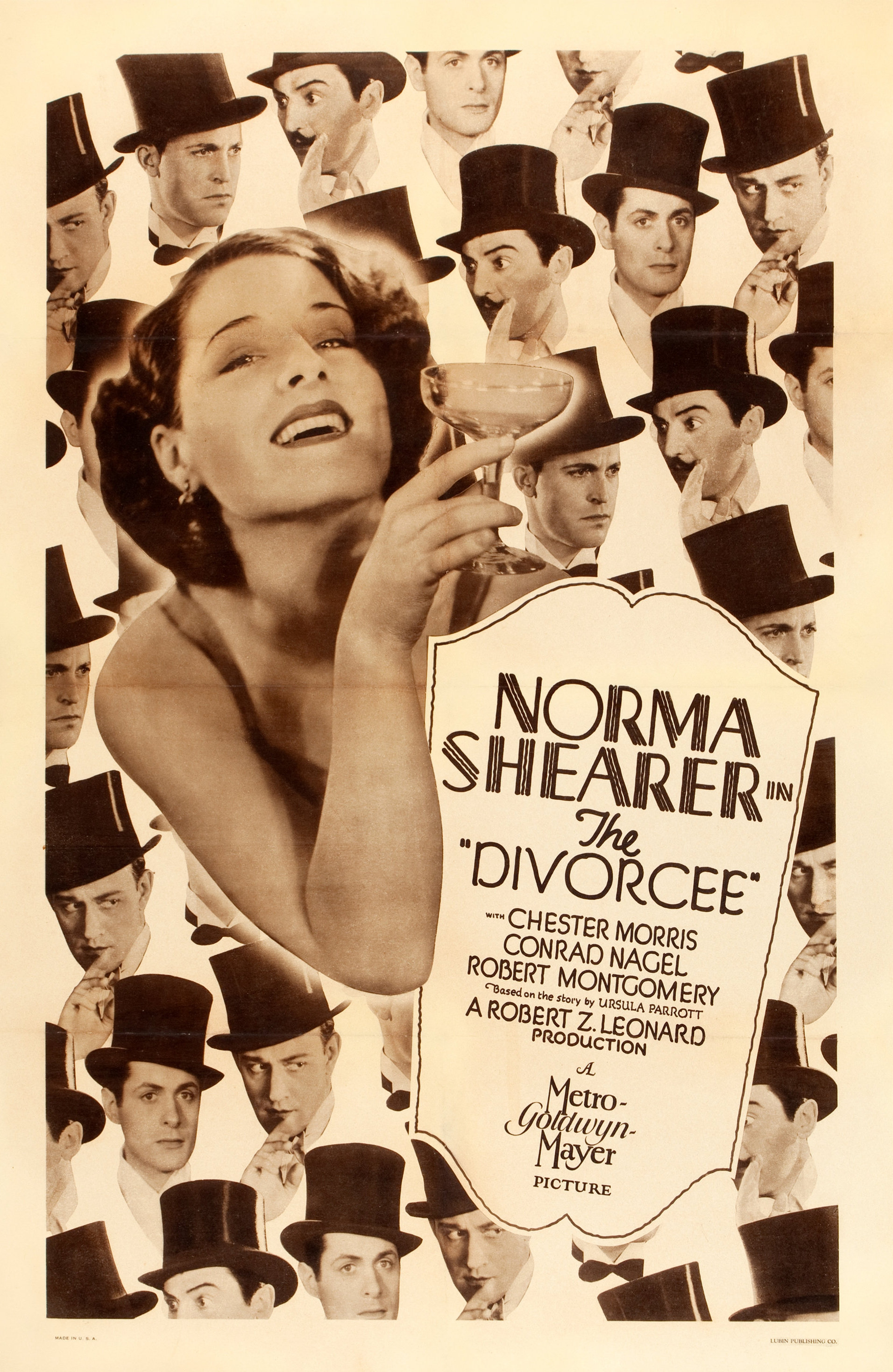
- Rotogravure poster
- Directed by: Robert Z. Leonard
- Written by: Treatment: Nick Grinde; Zelda Sears; Continuity and dialogue: John Meehan
- Based on: Ex-Wife; 1929 novel by Ursula Parrott
- Produced by: Robert Z. Leonard
- Starring: Norma Shearer; Chester Morris; Conrad Nagel; Robert Montgomery
- Cinematography: Norbert Brodine
- Edited by: Hugh Wynn
- Distributed by: Metro-Goldwyn-Mayer
- Release date: April 19, 1930 (United States)
- Running time: 84 minutes
- Country: United States
- Language: English

The Divorcee is a 1930 American pre-Code drama film directed by Robert Z. Leonard. It was written by Nick Grindé, Zelda Sears, and John Meehan, based on the 1929 novel Ex-Wife by Ursula Parrott. At the 3rd Academy Awards, The Divorcee received nominations for Best Picture, Best Director, and Best Writing (Meehan), and Norma Shearer won the award for Best Actress for her work on the film. As a film published in 1930, it entered the public domain on January 1, 2026.

== Plot ==
The Divorcee (1930)

Ted, Jerry, Paul, and Dorothy are part of the New York in-crowd. Jerry's decision to marry Ted crushes Paul. He gets drunk and drives, causing an accident that leaves Dorothy's face disfigured. Out of guilt, Paul marries Dorothy.

On the evening of Jerry and Ted's third anniversary, she discovers he has had a brief affair with another woman, though he tells Jerry it did not "mean a thing". Upset, and with Ted away on a business trip, Jerry spends the night with his best friend, Don. Upon Ted's return, she tells him that she "balanced our accounts", withholding Don's name. Ted is outraged, and they argue, which ends with Ted leaving her and the couple filing for divorce. While Jerry turns to partying to forget her sorrows, Ted becomes an alcoholic.

Sometime later, Paul and Jerry run into each other on a train. She discovers he still loves her and is willing to leave Dorothy, with whom he is in a loveless, resentful marriage, to be with her. They spend two weeks together and make plans for their future.

Dorothy comes to speak with Jerry at her home, but Paul is coincidentally meeting Jerry for dinner, and the three have an awkward exchange. Despite good arguments from Paul, Dorothy’s desperation not to lose him forces Jerry to reevaluate her decision to leave with Paul. Ultimately, Jerry admits she regrets giving up on her first marriage, and decides to see if Ted will reconcile, disappointing Paul bitterly a second time.

Weeks later, on her third attempt to locate Ted in Paris, Jerry finally finds him at a New Year's Eve party. After a polite exchange, Ted expresses his regret at how he reacted before the divorce. Jerry tells Ted her true feelings, and the two kiss at midnight to begin the new year, and their new lives, together.

== Cast ==
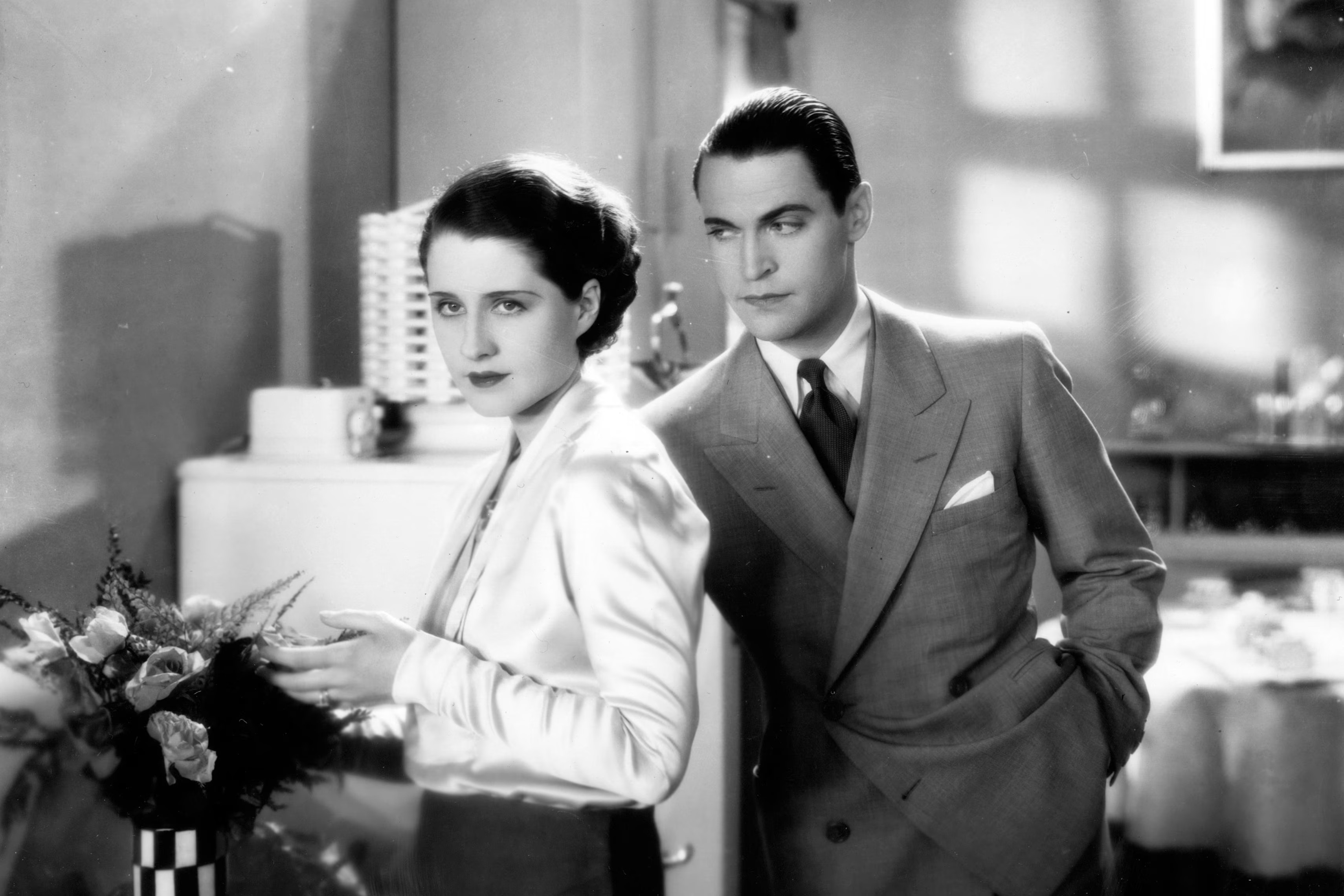
Chester Morris and Norma Shearer as Ted and Jerry Martin.

- Norma Shearer as Jerry Martin, née Bernard
- Chester Morris as Ted Martin
- Conrad Nagel as Paul
- Robert Montgomery as Don
- Florence Eldridge as Helen
- Helene Millard as Mary, Dorothy's sister
- Robert Elliott as Bill Baldwin, Helen's husband
- Mary Doran as Janice Meredith, a "floating grass widow"
- Tyler Brooke as Hank
- Zelda Sears as Hannah, the Baldwins' maid
- George Irving as Dr. Bernard, Jerry's father
- Judith Wood (credited as Helen Johnson) as Dorothy, Paul's wife
- Andy Shuford as the boy swimming in the lake (uncredited)
- Neal Dodd as Paul and Dorothy's wedding minister at the hospital (uncredited)
- Carl Stockdale as the divorce judge (uncredited)
- Theodore von Eltz as Ivan, Jerry's suitor on the train (uncredited)
- Charles R. Moore as the first train porter, who opens Jerry's window (uncredited)
- George H. Reed as the second train porter (uncredited)
- Lee Phelps as a party guest (uncredited)

== Production ==
MGM production head Irving Thalberg bought the rights to Ex-Wife in the summer of 1929, his original choice for the lead role of Jerry being Joan Crawford. Norma Shearer, Thalberg's wife, originally was not in the running to play Jerry because it was believed that she did not have enough sex appeal. Only after she arranged a special photo session with independent portrait photographer George Hurrell, and Thalberg saw the result, did he relent and give her the role.

== Reception ==
Norma Shearer won the award for Best Actress at the 3rd Academy Awards for her work on the film, which was also nominated for Best Picture, Best Director, and Best Writing.

== Home media ==
On March 4, 2008, Warner Home Video released The Divorcee (on the same disc as 1931's A Free Soul, also starring Shearer) as part of a DVD box set of five pre-Code films called "Forbidden Hollywood Collection, Vol. 2".
