= List of Ottawa Senators (original) seasons =

This documents the records and playoff results of seasons completed by the original-era Ottawa Senators ice hockey club, officially known as the Ottawa Hockey Club from the period of 1883 until 1934. The first reference to the name 'Senators' is in 1901, although the nickname only apparently came into common use in the 1910s. For the period 1903–1906, the club is best known as the 'Silver Seven', although this may be a later invention.

== History ==
The club began as a community-based sports club, founded in 1883. In 1889, the club joined the Ottawa Amateur Athletics Club, an offshoot of the Ottawa Amateur Athletics Association. Until the latter 1890s, the association's logo was on the club's jerseys. Prior to 1893, most play was either exhibition, tournament or challenge series. Regular season round-robin play began in the 1893 season, partly due to the influence of Governor General Lord Stanley who donated his Stanley Cup at this time also.

Over its history, the Ottawa club changed leagues regularly as leagues were disbanded over disputes and the progression from amateur community sporting club to professional hockey business. In the early 1890s, the club played in its own Ottawa City League, the Ontario Hockey Association (OHA), and the Amateur Hockey Association of Canada (AHAC) simultaneously. The club left the OHA in 1894 over a dispute over the OHA championship. The club kept a 'seconds' team in the City League, while the first team played in the AHAC. The AHAC league met its end in 1898 partly due to the Ottawa Hockey Club wanting to keep out the rival Ottawa Capitals hockey club. In 1905, the Ottawa Hockey Club left the AHAC's successor, the Canadian Amateur Hockey League (CAHL) over a dispute regarding replaying games, joining the Federal Amateur Hockey League for a season before forming the Eastern Canada Amateur Hockey Association (ECAHA).

In the period of 1906–1909, the club changed from a purely non-paid amateur club to one with a mix of amateurs and paid players, and finally fully professional. From the period of 1910 onwards, the club held a franchise in the fully professional National Hockey Association (NHA) and its descendant the National Hockey League (NHL). In 1934, the NHL franchise and players moved to St. Louis, Missouri and the organization started operating a Senators club in senior amateur and semi-professional hockey. The end of all descendants of the original Ottawa Hockey Club came in 1954 when Tommy Gorman folded the Senators organization due to declining attendance in competition with televised hockey.

== Amateur era ==
Note: GP = Games played, W = Wins, L = Losses, T = Ties, Pts = Points, GF = Goals for, GA = Goals against

Stanley Cup Champions	League Champion

=== Independent ===
- 1883–84 – Montreal Tournament and exhibitions
- 1884–85 – Montreal Tournament and exhibitions
- 1885–86 – Montreal Tournament was cancelled and no exhibitions were held. The club planned to play in the February 1886 Winter Carnival at Burlington, Vermont, but withdrew after the dates of the carnival were changed.

=== Amateur Hockey Association of Canada (AHAC) 1887–1898 ===
Ottawa HC played AHAC challenges in the league in 1887, 1891 and 1892, however regular seasons were not played until 1893.

In the 1889 and 1890 seasons, after the opening of the new Rideau Skating Rink, Ottawa played only exhibitions games against AHAC opponents.

Season	Team name	GP	W	L	T	PTS	GF	GA	Finish	Playoffs
1886–87	Ottawa HC	1	0	1	0	0	1	5	—	Played in one challenge
1890–91	Ottawa HC	2	1	1	0	2	1	3	—	Won two exhibitions, lost one challenge.
1891–92	Ottawa HC	6	5	1	0	10	23	9	—	Won Canadian championship Lost in final AHAC Challenge
1892–93	Ottawa HC	8	6	2	0	12	49	22	2nd	—
1893–94	Ottawa HC	8	5	3	0	10	24	16	2nd	Lost in final
1894–95	Ottawa HC	8	4	4	0	8	25	24	3rd	—
1895–96	Ottawa HC	8	6	2	0	12	22	26	2nd	—
1896–97	Ottawa HC	8	5	3	0	10	25	18	2nd	—
1897–98	Ottawa HC	8	2	6	0	4	28	44	5th	—

=== Ontario Hockey Association 1890–1893 ===
Season	Team name	GP	W	L	T	GF	GA	Playoffs
1890–91	Ottawa HC	4 (Note: Two games were friendlies.)	4	0	0	15	2	Won Ontario Championship
1891–92	Ottawa HC	2	2	0	0	15	4	Won Ontario Championship
1892–93	Ottawa HC	2 (Note: Only one game played (semifinal against Queen's). Toronto Granite defaulted in championship.)	2	0	0	6	4	Won Ontario Championship

=== Canadian Amateur Hockey League 1899–1904 ===
Season	Team name	GP	W	L	T	PTS	GF	GA	Finish	Playoffs
1898–99	Ottawa HC	8	4	4	0	8	21	43	3rd	—
1899–1900	Ottawa HC	8	4	4	0	8	28	19	3rd	—
1900–01	Ottawa HC	8	7	0	1	15	33	20	1st	Won league title
1901–02	Ottawa Senators	8	5	3	0	10	35	15	2nd	—
1902–03	Ottawa Senators	8	6	2	0	12	47	26	1st	Won Stanley Cup
1903–04	Ottawa Senators	4	4	0	0	8	32	15	incomplete (Note: Ottawa resigned February 8, 1904, playing friendlies and Cup challenges only for the balance of the hockey season.)	Won Stanley Cup

=== Federal Amateur Hockey League 1904–05 ===
Season	GP	W	L	T	PTS	GF	GA	Finish	Playoffs
1903–04	—	—	—	—	—	—	—	—	Won league title vs. Wanderers, retained Stanley Cup
1904–05	8	7	1	0	14	60	19	1st	Won Stanley Cup

Ottawa Hockey Club joined the FAHL in 1903–04 but did not play in the regular season. A series was arranged against the Montreal Wanderers for the Stanley Cup and the FAHL title. Ottawa won the series after the Wanderers withdrew in a dispute over the series after the first game was tied 5–5.

== Professional era ==
Stanley Cup Champions	League Champion

=== Eastern Canada Amateur Hockey Association 1906–1909 ===
Year	GP	W	L	T	PTS	GF	GA	Finish	Playoffs
1905–06	10	9	1	0	18	90	42	1st (tie)	Won two Stanley Cup challenges, tied for league title Lost playoff against Montreal Wanderers for Stanley Cup
1906–07	10	7	3	0	76	54	14	2nd	—
1907–08	10	7	3	0	86	51	14	2nd	—
1908–09	12	10	2	0	117	63	20	1st	Won Stanley Cup

=== Canadian Hockey Association 1910 ===
Season	GP	W	L	T	Pts	GF	GA	Finish	Playoffs
1909–10	2	2	0	0	4	29	9	—	Defeated Galt in Stanley Cup challenge

League was abandoned after two games.

=== National Hockey Association 1910–1917 ===
Season	GP	W	L	T	Pts	GF	GA	Finish	Playoffs
1909–10	12	9	3	0	18	89	66	2nd	Defeated Edmonton in Stanley Cup challenge
1910–11	16	13	3	—	26	122	69	1st	Won League Title to Win Stanley Cup; Won two Stanley Cup single-game challenges
1911–12	18	9	9	—	18	99	93	2nd	—
1912–13	20	9	11	—	18	87	81	3rd	—
1913–14	20	11	9	—	22	65	71	4th	—
1914–15	20	14	6	—	28	74	65	1st	Won league title, 4–1 (TG), Wanderers; Lost Stanley Cup Final, 0–3, Millionaires
1915–16	24	13	11	0	26	78	72	2nd	—
1916–17	10	7	3	—	14	56	41	2nd	Lost league final, 6–7 (TG), Canadiens
Totals	140	85	55	0					Series record: 2–2

=== National Hockey League 1917–1934 ===
Note: GP = Games played, W = Wins, L = Losses, T = Ties, Pts = Points, GF = Goals for, GA = Goals against, PIM= Penalties in minutes

Stanley Cup Champions	Division Champions/Reg. Season Leader	League leader

Season	GP	W	L	T	Pts	GF	GA	PIM	Finish	Playoffs
1917–18	22	9	13	0	18	102	114	—	3rd in NHL	Out of playoffs
1918–19	18	12	6	0	24	71	54	192	1st in NHL	Lost in NHL championship, 1–4 (Montreal Canadiens)
1919–20	24	19	5	0	38	121	64	237	1st in NHL; Won O'Brien Cup	Defeated Seattle Metropolitans (3–2); Won Stanley Cup
1920–21	24	14	10	0	28	97	75	151	1st in NHL	Defeated Toronto St. Patricks (7–0 TG); Won O'Brien Cup; Defeated Vancouver Millionaires (3–2) on Stanley Cup
1921–22	24	14	8	2	30	106	84	99	1st in NHL	Lost to Toronto St. Patricks (4–5 TG)
1922–23	24	14	9	1	29	77	54	188	1st in NHL	Defeated Montreal Canadiens (3–2 TG); Won O'Brien Cup; Defeated Vancouver (PCHA) (3–1); Defeated Edmonton (WCHL) (2–0); Won Stanley Cup
1923–24	24	16	8	0	32	74	54	154	1st in NHL	Lost to Montreal Canadiens (2–5 TG)
1924–25	30	17	12	1	35	83	66	331	4th in NHL	Out of playoffs
1925–26	36	24	8	4	52	77	42	341	1st in NHL	Lost to Montreal Maroons (1–2 TG)
1926–27	44	30	10	4	64	86	69	607	1st in Canadian Division; Won Prince of Wales Trophy	Defeated Montreal Canadiens (5–1) TG in NHL semifinal Defeated Boston Bruins 2–0–2 (best-of-five); Won O'Brien Cup; Won Stanley Cup
1927–28	44	20	14	10	50	78	57	483	1st in Canadian Division	Lost in quarterfinal (Montreal Maroons)
1928–29	44	14	17	13	41	54	67	461	4th in Canadian Division	Out of playoffs
1929–30	44	21	15	8	50	138	118	536	5th in Canadian Division	Lost in quarterfinal (3–6 TG) (New York Rangers)
1930–31	44	10	30	4	24	91	142	486	5th in Canadian Division	Out of playoffs
1931–32	Team on hiatus									
1932–33	48	11	27	10	32	88	131	398	5th in Canadian Division	Out of playoffs
1933–34	48	13	29	6	32	115	143	344	5th in Canadian Division	Out of playoffs
Relocated to St. Louis
Totals	542	258	221	63						Series record: 8–6

NHL Records as of June 11, 2007.

== See also ==
- Ottawa Senators (FHL), rival team in 1908–09 featuring Silver Seven members.
- Ottawa Senators (senior hockey), amateur / minor pro era 1934–1955
- St. Louis Eagles, relocated NHL franchise, 1934–35
- Ottawa Senators, 1992–present
