= 1890 Ottawa Hockey Club season =

Canadian ice hockey club season

The 1890 Ottawa Hockey Club season was the club's fifth season of play. Although the club was based at the Rideau Skating Rink, it played only two games against outside teams and did not participate in championship play.

== Team business ==
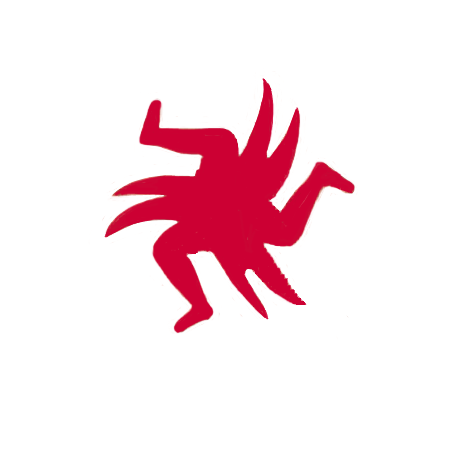
First logo of Ottawa Hockey Club. (based on logo of Ottawa Amateur Athletic Club)

P. D. Ross was named team president, and Frank Jenkins, again the captain. The Club became affiliated with the new Ottawa Amateur Athletic Club and adopted the red, black and white colours of the Association, and adopted the club's triskelion logo. The uniform was not yet the 'barber pole' design, but a white jersey with black trim and the Club logo, white knee breeches and black stockings.

== Season ==
The Club played an exhibition game against the Montreal Victorias at the Rideau Rink (a 3–1 loss on February 25), in conjunction with the Canadian skating championships. The 'seconds' played five games, four against Ottawa College, now the second ice hockey team in town.

== Roster ==
(against outside teams)

- Reginald Bradley
- Edwin 'Ted' Dey
- Thomas Green
- Frank Jenkins
- Jack Kerr
- Chauncey Kirby
- Halder Kirby
- George Young
- Weldy Young
