= 1891–92 Ottawa Hockey Club season =

Ice hockey team season of play

1891–92 Ottawa Hockey Club
- 1891–92 record: 8–1–0
- Home record: 6–1–0
- Road record: 2–0–0

Team information
- Captain: Bert Russel
- Arena: Rideau Skating Rink

The 1891–92 Ottawa Hockey Club season was the club's seventh season of play. The Club would play in the Amateur Hockey Association of Canada, the Ontario Hockey Association (OHA) and inter-city play. Ottawa would win their second straight OHA championship. Ottawa would also win the AHAC championship on January 10, and hold it until March 7.

== AHAC series ==
Play in the AHAC was by challenge. Ottawa won on January 10 to become champions. In all, Ottawa would win six challenges, but lose the final one to lose the AHAC championship.

#	Date	Location	Opponent	Score	Decision	Attendance	Record
1	January 10, 1892	Montreal (Crystal Rink)	Montreal Hockey Club	4–3(OT)	W	–	1–0–0
2	January 15, 1892	Ottawa (Rideau Rink)	Montreal Shamrocks	8–3	W	–	2–0–0
3	January 21, 1892	Ottawa (Rideau Rink)	Montreal Hockey Club	10–2	W	–	3–0–0
4	January 28, 1892	Ottawa (Rideau Rink)	Quebec Hockey Club	4–3(OT)	W	–	4–0–0
5	February 11, 1892	Ottawa (Rideau Rink)	Montreal Hockey Club	3–1	W	–	5–0–0
6	February 18, 1892	Ottawa (Rideau Rink)	Quebec Hockey Club	2–0	W	–	6–0–0
7	March 7, 1892	Ottawa (Rideau Rink)	Montreal Hockey Club	0–1	L	3,000	6–1–0

== OHA series ==
To reach the final, Ottawa had to defeat Queen's University.

Date	Winning Team	Score	Losing Team	Location
February 20, 1892	Ottawa HC	5–0	Queen's University	Ottawa (Rideau Rink)
March 2, 1892	Ottawa HC	10–4	Toronto Osgoode Hall	Toronto (Granite Curling Club)

Rosters

Ottawa	G	P	Toronto	G
A. Morel		G	W. A. Smith	
F. Jenkins		P	C. Swabey	
W. Young	1	CP	Boys	
H. Russel	1	F	E. C. Senkler	1
C. Kirby	3	F	W. A. H. Kerr	1
H. Kirby	4	F	J. F. Smellie	2
R. Bradley	1	F	H. Mack	

Referee: E. Littlejohn, Umpires: V. Chadwick and C. A. Bogert Attendance: 2,500

Source: "The Ottawas Are Champions". The Globe. March 3, 1892. p. 6.

== Celebration dinner ==
The Ottawa Hockey Club was feted at a party by the Ottawa Amateur Athletic Association at Ottawa's Russell House hotel on March 18, 1892. The dinner is notable as Lord Stanley, the Governor-General would announce his new trophy, the "Dominion Hockey Challenge Cup", today known as the Stanley Cup. Lord Kilcoursie, Stanley's aide made the announcement:

"I have for some time been thinking that it would be a good thing if there were a challenge cup which would be held by the champion hockey team in the Dominion. There does not appear to be any such outward and visible sign of a championship at present, and considering the general interest which the matches now elicit, and in the importance of having the games played fairly and under rules generally recognized, I am willing to give a cup, which shall be held from year to year by the winning team.
I am not quite certain that the present regulations governing the arrangement of matches give entire satisfaction, and it would be worth considering whether they could not be arranged so that each team would play once at home and once at the play where their opponents hail from."

According to Shea and Wilson, the second paragraph is a reference to the disappointment in the AHAC series. Ottawa had held the championship for most of the season, only to lose in the end. The AHAC would change its method of play from challenge to round-robin in the 1893 season.

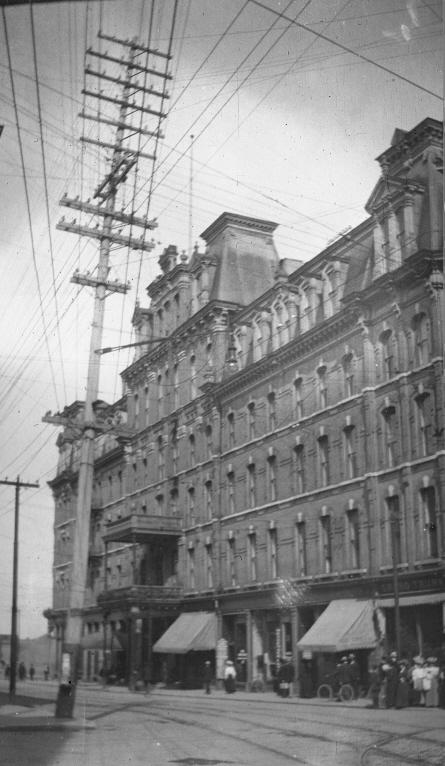
Ottawa's Russell House Hotel in 1907.

Lord Kilcoursie composed a song for the occasion:

THE HOCKEY MEN

There is a game called hockey
There is no finer game
For though some call it 'knockey'
Yet we love it all the same.

This played in His Dominion
Well played both near and far
There's only one opinion
How 'tis played in Ottawa.

Then give three cheers for Russell
The captain of the boys.
However tough the tussle
His position he enjoys.

And then for all the others
Let's shout as loud we may
An O, a T, a T, an A
A W and A!

Now list' to me one minute
I'll tell you where they play
And why it is that eagerly
We welcome them today

They vanquished in their revel
Quebec and Montreal
The gallant club, the Rebels
and the Queen's and Osgoode Hall

Well, first there's Chauncy Kirby
He's worth his weight in gold
For though he is not very big
He's very very bold.

Supported by his brother
They make a wondrous pair
For either one or t'other
Is invariably there.

And on the left, there's Bradley
And on the right, there's Kerr
And when the centres pass it
There, on either side, they are.

And that's what won the battles
Their fine unselfish play
Cool heads that nothing rattles
In the thickest of the fray.

At cover point – important place
There's Young, a bulwark strong.
No dodging tricks or flying pace
Will baffle him for long.

At point, we have the captain
And if he gets the puck
Will very near the goal he'll shoot
And get it too, with luck.

There's yet another member
Impregnable Morel.
He's had his share of work to do
And done it very well.

And there is also Jenkins
Who played in matches twain
So well that in Toronto
They don't wish for him again.

And now, my friends, forgive me
The moral of my song
I'll soon explain in twenty words
Nor keep you very long.

We've here eight bright examples
Of fine unselfish play
And that's the secret of success
And why they're here today.

Just one word to the audience
And every player too
(Forgive me, though a novice,
In dictating this to you).

Don't question a decision
However wrong it be.
And little boys, for manner's sake,
Don't hoot the referee!

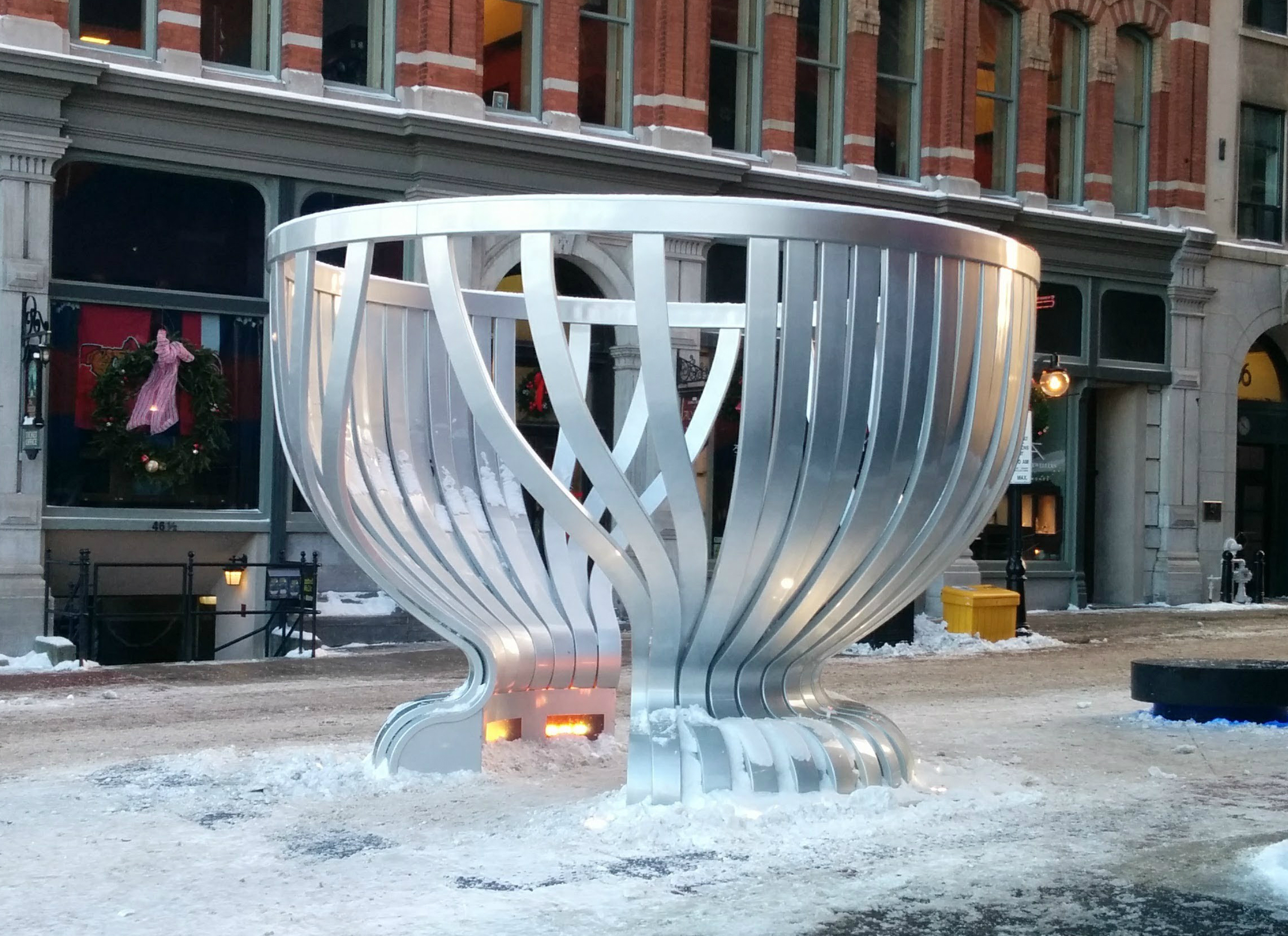
Stanley Cup Monument

== Stanley Cup monument ==
In October 2017, the "Lord Stanley's Gift Monument" to the donation of the Stanley Cup was erected in Ottawa at Sparks Street and Elgin Street, near the location of the Russell House hotel, which has since been demolished.

== Roster ==
- Reginald Bradley, William Dey, Frank Jenkins, Jack Kerr, E.C. Grant, Chauncey Kirby, Halder Kirby, Albert Morel, Bert Russel, Weldy Young

== See also ==
- 1892 AHAC season
- Amateur Hockey Association of Canada
- Ice hockey in Ottawa
- Rideau Hall Rebels
- Stanley Cup
