= 1890–91 Ottawa Hockey Club season =

Canadian ice hockey club season

1890–91 Ottawa Hockey Club
- 1890–91 record: 13–1–0

Team information
- Captain: P. D. Ross
- Arena: Rideau Skating Rink

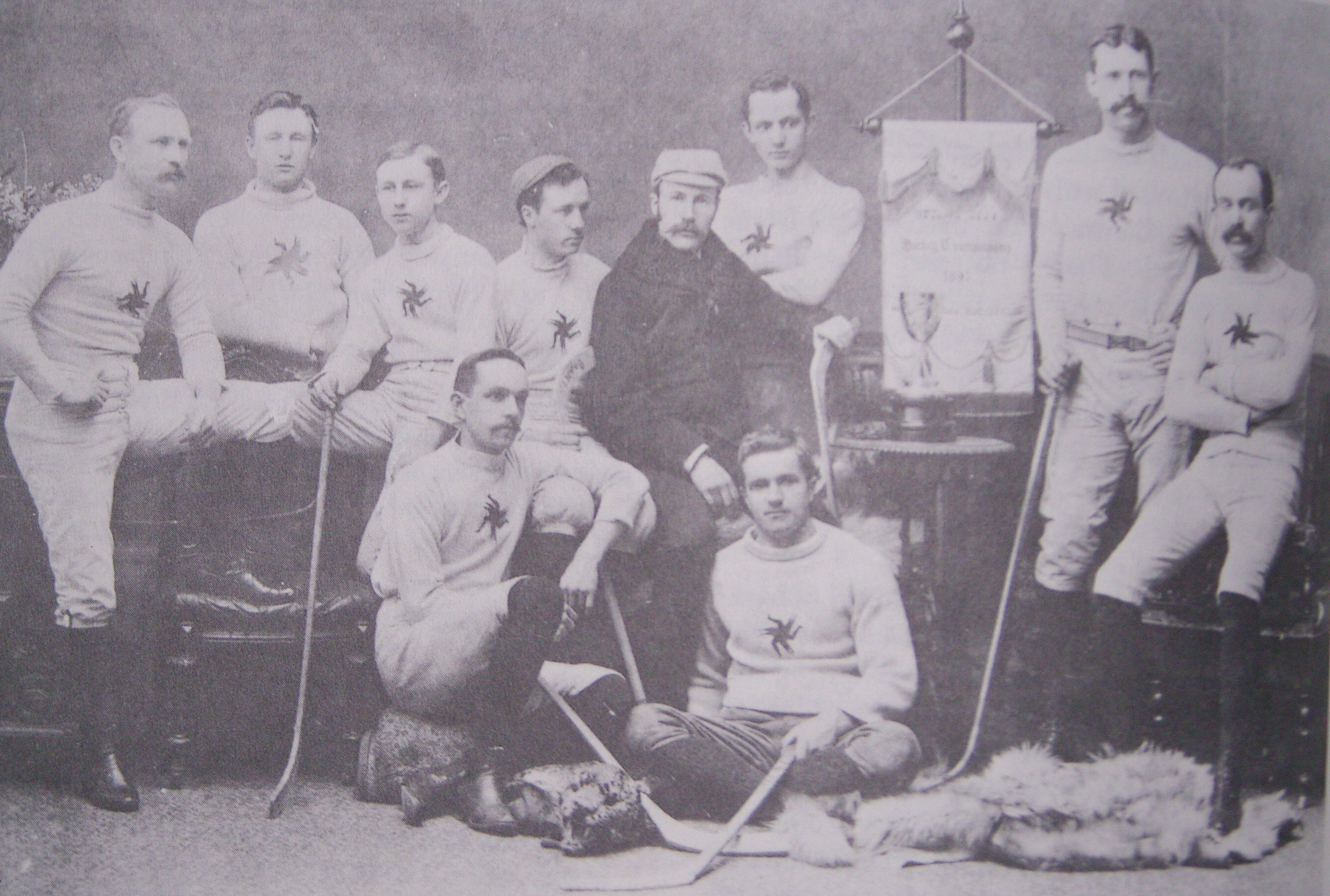
Ottawa Hockey Club, 1891 Back Row, L to R: Halder Kirby, Albert Morel, Chauncey Kirby, H.Y. Russel, F.M.S. Jenkins(coat), W.C. Young, ? Front Row, L to R: R. Bradley, J. Kerr, ?

The 1890–91 Ottawa Hockey Club season was the club's sixth season of play. The club would have an outstanding record, winning 13 and losing 1. The club would play in the Ontario Hockey Association (OHA) in the OHA's first season and would win its championship, the Cosby Cup, against Amateur Hockey Association of Canada(AHAC) teams and against other Ottawa teams.

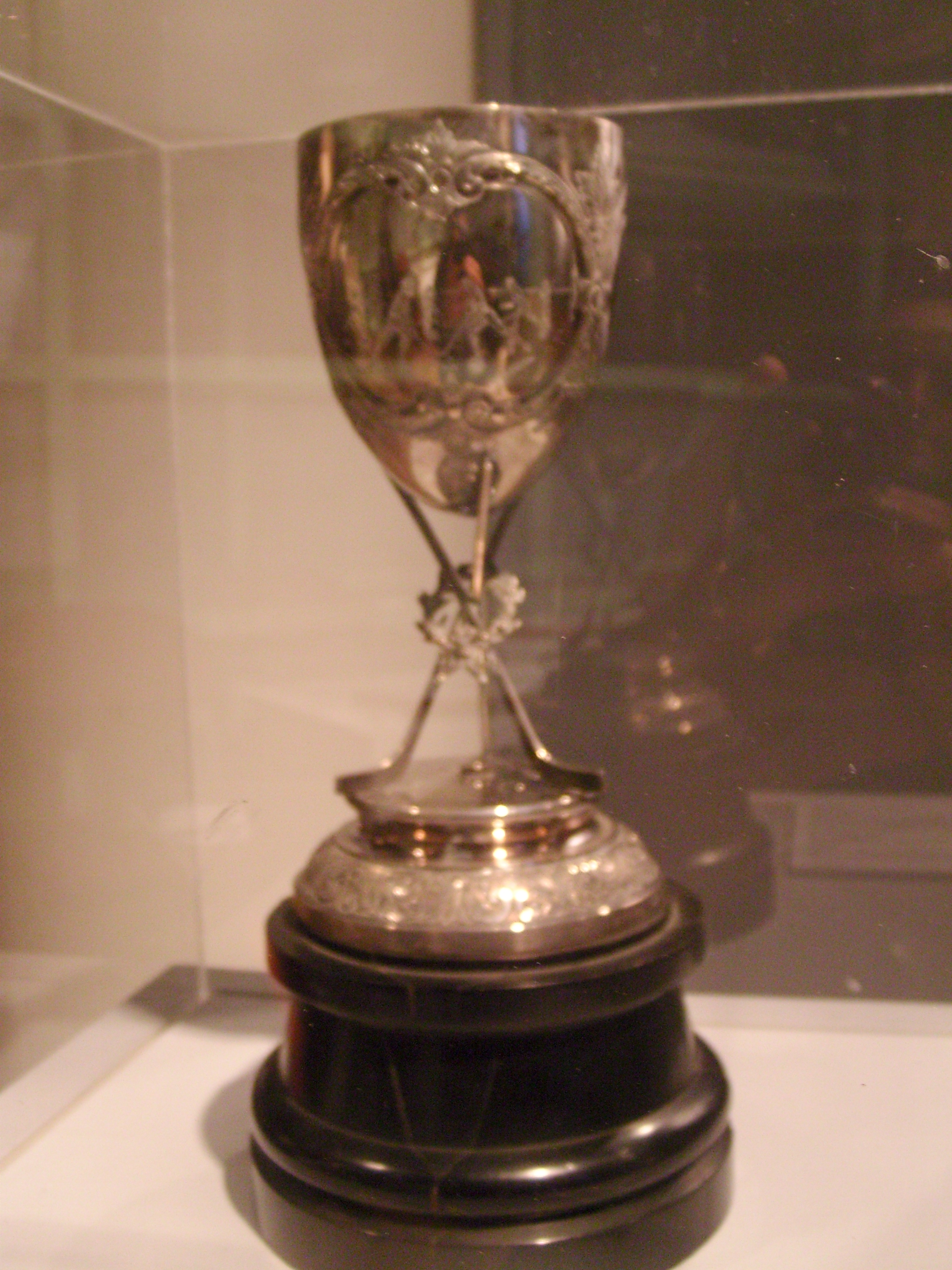
Cosby Cup, on display at Ottawa City Hall, January, 2009

== Team business ==
The club met on November 19, 1890, and elected their officers:

- F. M. S. Jenkins, president
- P. D. Ross, captain
- D. C. Scott, secretary-treasurer

The club also approved the idea of the forming of a city league in Ottawa composed of the Ottawa HC, Rideau Club, Ottawa College, Dey's Rink and Rebels clubs. This was the start of the Ottawa City Hockey League.

The club nominated J. A. Baum to be their representative at the founding meeting of the Ontario Hockey Association. Frank Jenkins, it was announced, would not play this year due to "an accident to his leg."

In the team's financial statement for the season, the team recorded a $70.11 deficit on expenses of $121.11 and minus an OAAC grant of $30 and $21 from team member subscriptions.

== Schedule and results ==
#	Date	Series	Opponent	Score	Decision	Record
1	December 30, 1890	City	Ottawa College	11–1	W	1–0–0
2	January 14, 1891	City	Ottawa College	3–1	W	2–0–0
3	January 17, 1891	AHAC(exhib)	McGill College	3–2	W	3–0–0
4	January 31, 1891	AHAC(exhib)	Montreal Victorias	1–0	W	4–0–0
5	February 6, 1891	City	Rideaus	5–0	W	5–0–0
6	February 9, 1891	City	Rideaus	4–0	W	6–0–0
7	February 11, 1891^{1}	City	Dey's Rink	3–0	W	7–0–0
8	February 21, 1891^{2}	AHAC	Montreal Hockey Club	0–3	L	7–1–0
9	February 26, 1891	City	Ottawa College	3–2	W	8–1–0
10	February 28, 1891	OHA	Queen's College	4–0	W	9–1–0
11	March 7, 1891 ^{3}	OHA	Toronto St. George's	5–0	W	10–1–0
12	March 14, 1891	OHA (exhib)	Toronto St. George's	4–0	W	11–1–0
13	March 14, 1891	OHA (exhib)	Toronto Osgoode Hall	6–2	W	12–1–0
14	March 20, 1891	City (final)	Gladstones	4–0	W	13–1–0

^{1} City championship
^{2} AHAC challenge
^{3} OHA championship

Sources:

- "The Ottawa Champions", The Ottawa Citizen, p. 3, February 1, 1891
- "A Good Record At The Capital", The Globe, p. 3, March 23, 1891

== Roster ==
- Albert Morel – goal
- Reginald Bradley
- F. M. S. Jenkins – point,
- Jack Kerr – point,
- Weldy Young – cover-point,
- P. D. Ross – forward,
- Halder Kirby – forward,
- Chauncey Kirby – forward,
- Bert Russel – forward,
- J. Smith – forward
