= 1896–97 Ottawa Hockey Club season =

Canadian ice hockey club season

1896–97 Ottawa Hockey Club
- League: 2nd AHAC
- 1896–97 record: 5–3–0

Team information
- Captain: Fred Chittick
- Arena: Dey's Skating Rink

Team leaders
- Goals: Alf Smith (12)
- Goals against average: Fred Chittick (2.3)

The 1896–97 Ottawa Hockey Club season was the club's 12th season of play. Ottawa placed second in the league.

== Team business ==
Directors

- P. D. Ross – Honorary president
- A. Z. Palmer – Honorary vice-president
- S. M. Rogers – President
- C. Kirby – Vice-president
- J. P. Dickson – Secretary
- G. P. Murphy – Treasurer
- F. C. Chittick – Captain
- W. A. Cox, H. Westwick, Fred White – Executive committee

Source: "Sports of all sorts". The Globe. November 14, 1896. p. 26.

== Season ==
=== Highlights ===
Fred Chittick was the league's leading goaltender, only allowing 2.3 goals per game. Former captains Chauncy Kirby and Bert Russel retired from the team.

The Ottawa club moved to the new Dey's Skating Rink. In the first game in the new rink, it was inaugurated with the Governor General, the Earl of Aberdeen and his wife, the Countess of Aberdeen in attendance.

=== Final standing ===
Team	Games Played	Wins	Losses	Ties	Goals For	Goals Against
Montreal Victorias	8	7	1	0	48	26
Ottawa	8	5	3	0	25	18
Montreal	8	5	3	0	31	26
Quebec	8	2	6	0	22	46
Montreal Shamrocks	8	1	7	0	27	37

== Schedule and results ==
Day	Visitor	Score	Home	Score	Record
January
9	Shamrocks	1	Ottawa	4	1–0
16	Quebec	1	Ottawa	4	2–0
30†	Ottawa	0	Montreal	1	2–1†
February
6	Victorias	4	Ottawa	2	2–1
13	Ottawa	3	Victorias	1	3–1
17‡	Ottawa	4	Montreal	0	4–1
20	Montreal	4	Ottawa	3	4–2
27	Ottawa	1	Quebec	4	4–3
March
6	Ottawa	4	Shamrocks	3	5–3

† Protested by Ottawa who scored the tying goal in last few seconds but the goal was disallowed by the referee. The protest was upheld and the game replayed.

‡ Replay of January 30 protested game.

=== Goaltending averages ===
Name	GP	GA	SO	Avg.
Fred Chittick	8	18	1	2.3

=== Scoring Leaders ===
Name	GP	G
Smith, Alf	8	12
Westwick, Harry	8	6
Charlie Spittal	7	3
Alf Living	2	2
Daniel "Moxie" Smith	5	2

== Roster ==
- Fred Chittick – goal
- William Dey
- Howard Hutchison
- Alf Living
- Harvey Pulford
- Alf Smith
- Daniel "Moxie" Smith
- Charlie Spittal
- Harry Westwick
- Weldy Young

== See also ==
- 1897 AHAC season
