= 1889 Ottawa Hockey Club season =

Canadian ice hockey club season

The 1889 Ottawa Hockey Club season was the fourth season of play of the Ottawa Hockey Club. The Ottawa Hockey Club re-organized after the opening of the Rideau Skating Rink, after playing no competitive games in the 1888 winter season.

== Team business ==
P. D. Ross, the new publisher of the Ottawa Journal became the team president.

== Season ==
The captain was Frank Jenkins, and the other players were Halder Kirby, Jack Kerr, Nelson Porter, Ross, George Young, Weldy Young, Thomas D. Green, William O'Dell, Tom Gallagher, Albert Low and Henry Ami. In 1889, the club did not issue any challenges for the AHAC title. The club played only one match against an outside club, an exhibition at the Rideau Rink against the Montreal Hockey Club 'second' team.

== Roster ==
- Edwin 'Ted' Dey
- Frank Jenkins
- Jack Kerr
- Halder Kirby
- Nelson Porter
- George Young
- Weldy Young
