= 1893–94 Ottawa Hockey Club season =

Ice hockey team season of play

1893–94 Ottawa Hockey Club
- League: 1st AHAC
- 1893–94 record: 5–3–0

Team information
- Captain: Weldy Young
- Arena: Rideau Skating Rink

Team leaders
- Goals: Bert Russel (10)
- Goals against average: A. Morel (2.0)

The 1893–94 Ottawa Hockey Club season was the club's ninth season of play. The Club played in the Amateur Hockey Association of Canada (AHAC) and the Ontario Hockey Association (OHA) leagues. Ottawa tied for first in the AHAC championship and played Montreal for the Stanley Cup. Ottawa was about to play the OHA semi-final, but in a dispute with the OHA executive, refused to travel to Toronto to play the final, and left the league.

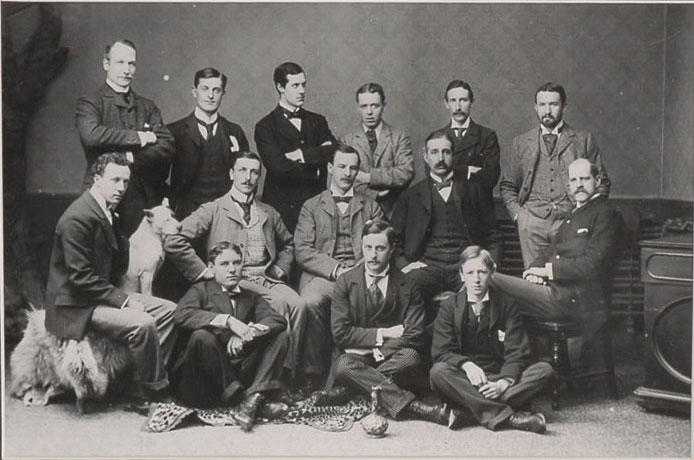
Formal team photo in 1894

== OHA season ==
Several days before a scheduled match with Queen's to determine the eastern team in the OHA final, the OHA notified Ottawa that the final would be held in Toronto. The Ottawa Hockey Club demanded that the final be played in Ottawa to make up for the default of the Toronto Granites the previous year. The OHA executive refused to change the plans for Ottawa to play in Toronto and the Ottawa club resigned, leaving Queen's as the eastern team in the final. The OHA executive accepted the resignation on February 25, 1894, in a letter to Secretary Murphy.

This started a rift between the Ottawa and Ontario hockey associations that would last over 70 years. An Ottawa team would not be a member of any OHA league until the Ottawa 67s would join the OHA Junior 'A' in 1967, 73 years later. As of 2014, teams in the Ottawa area play in the Ottawa District Hockey Association, the successor of the Ottawa City Hockey League, and not affiliated with the Ontario association.

== AHAC season ==
Ottawa returned to play in the AHAC and tied for first place. What was unusual was that they shared first place with three other clubs. The executive of the AHAC proposed a playoff between all four teams, held in Montreal. Quebec city objected to the fact that no games were in Quebec city. Ottawa received a bye to the final because it had to travel to Montreal to play.

=== Final standing ===
Team	Games Played	Wins	Losses	Ties	Goals For	Goals Against
Montreal Hockey Club	8	5	3	0	25	15
Ottawa Hockey Club	8	5	3	0	24	16
Montreal Victorias	8	5	3	0	36	20
Quebec Hockey Club	8	5	3	0	26	27
Montreal Crystals	8	0	8	0	10	43

=== Game log ===
Month	Day	Visitor	Score	Home	Score	Record
Jan.	6	Crystals	1	Ottawa	6	1–0
Jan.	13	Ottawa	1	Quebec	4	1–1
Jan.	20	Victorias	1	Ottawa	5	2–1
Jan.	27	Ottawa	4	Montreal	1	3–1
Feb.	9	Ottawa	3	Crystals	1	4–1
Feb.	17	Ottawa	2	Victorias	3	4–2
Feb.	24	Montreal	5	Ottawa	1	4–3
Mar.	3	Quebec	0	Ottawa	2	5–3

=== Goaltending averages ===
Name	Club	GP	GA	SO	Avg.
Morel, A.	Ottawa	8	16	1	2.0

=== Scoring leaders ===
These statistics are for AHAC play only.

Name	GP	G
Bert Russel	8	10
Chauncy Kirby	8	6
Sam McDougall	7	5
Don C. Watters	1	1
Joe McDougal	6	1
Weldy Young	8	1

== Roster ==
- Albert Morel (goal)
- Reginald Bradley
- Edward C. Grant
- Chauncy Kirby
- Halder Kirby
- Joe McDougal
- Sam McDougall
- Harvey Pulford
- Bert Russel (captain)
- Don C. Waters
- Weldy Young

Source: Coleman, pp. 16–17, Kitchen, p. 341

== See also ==
- 1894 AHAC season

== References and notes ==
- Coleman, Charles L. (1966) [1964]. The Trail of the Stanley Cup, Vol. 1, 1893–1926 inc. pp. 13–18.
- Kitchen, Bill (2008). Win, Tie or Wrangle: The Inside Story of the Old Ottawa Senators 1883–1935. Manotick, Ontario: Penumbra Press. ISBN 978-1-897323-46-5.
