= 1884 Ottawa Hockey Club season =

Season of play of ice hockey club

1884 Ottawa Hockey Club
- 1884 record: 2-2-0
- Road record: 2-2-0

Team information
- Coach: None
- Arena: Royal Rink

The 1884 Ottawa Hockey Club season was the club's first season of play. The club had formed the previous March and now was playing a season against other clubs. They played in red and black striped sweaters. The team played in the 1884 Montreal Winter Carnival tournament, placing second.

== Team business ==
The president of the club is recorded as Mr. M. M. Pyke.

== Season ==
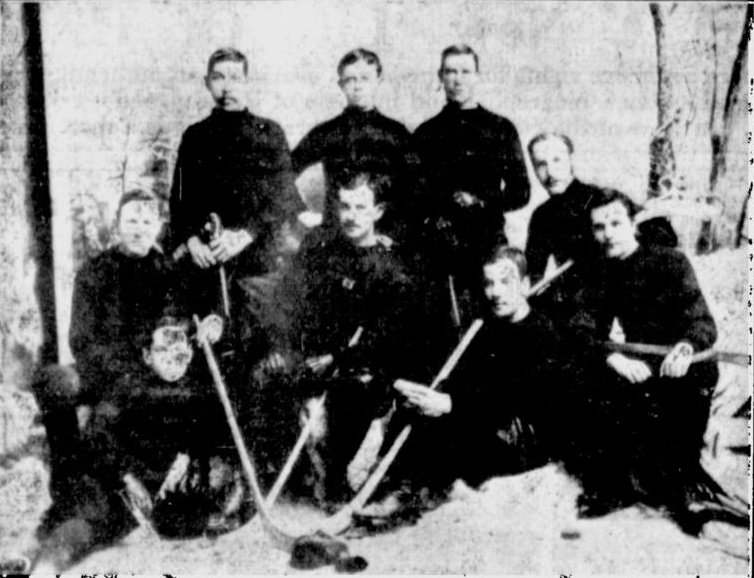
First photo of Ottawa Hockey Club, 1883–84 (L to R). Back row: Green, Gallagher, Porter. Middle row: Kirby, Kerr, Jenkins. Front row: Young, Low, Taylor

The club played in the Montreal Winter Carnival Tournament. The team players were impressed with the cheering by the McGill students during their games against the Victorias. After the tournament, the team was feted by team president Pyke.

#	Date	Series	Opponent	Score	Decision	Record
1	February 7, 1884	Carnival	McGill College	0–1	L	0–1–0
2	February 8, 1884	Carnival	Montreal Victorias	9–1	W	1–1–0
3	February 10, 1884	Carnival	McGill College	3–0	W	2–1–0
4	February 11, 1884	Carnival	Montreal Victorias	0–1	L	2–2–0

=== Championship final ===
The final game against the Victorias was tied after regulation play. The Ottawas wanted to claim the championship as they had beaten the Victorias in the first game, and had now tied in the other. The organizers instead ordered another 30 minutes of play to decide the championship. In overtime, the Victorias' Myers scored on a "splendidly directed shot" to score the game-winner.

== Roster ==
Thomas D. Green, Thomas Gallagher, F.M.S. (Frank) Jenkins, Jack Kerr, Halder Kirby, Albert Peter Low, Nelson Porter, Ernest Taylor, George Young
