= 1898–99 Ottawa Hockey Club season =

Canadian ice hockey club season

1898–99 Ottawa Hockey Club
- League: 3rd CAHL
- 1898–99 record: 4–4–0

Team information
- Captain: Chauncy Kirby
- Arena: Dey's Skating Rink

Team leaders
- Goals: Mac Roger (6)
- Goals against average: Bouse Hutton (5.5)

The 1898–99 Ottawa Hockey Club season was the club's 14th season of play. Ottawa placed third in the league.

== Team business ==
The rival Ottawa Capitals applied to join the Amateur Hockey Association of Canada (AHAC). When the AHAC league accepted the Capitals, Ottawa, along with Montreal, Quebec and Victorias left the AHAC. The clubs would form the Canadian Amateur Hockey League (CAHL) along with the Montreal Shamrocks.

== Season ==
The future Hall of Fame brothers Hod and Bruce Stuart made their debuts for Ottawa this season. Harvey Pulford did not play this season, recovering from a collarbone injury sustained in the Canadian football championship game. Chauncy Kirby would return to captain the team in his place.

=== Highlights ===
A controversy erupted between goaltender Fred Chittick and the Ottawa club, prompting accusations that Chittick was a "shamateur" receiving payment to play. Bouse Hutton would replace Chittick in net, starting on February 18, after Chittick gave up 16 goals in a game on February 11. Chittick attempted to score by himself, rushing the length of the ice from his net, without success.

=== Final standing ===
Team	Games Played	Wins	Losses	Ties	Goals For	Goals Against
Montreal Shamrocks	8	7	1	0	40	21
Montreal Victorias	8	6	2	0	44	23
Ottawa Hockey Club	8	4	4	0	21	43
Montreal Hockey Club	8	3	5	0	30	29
Quebec Hockey Club	8	0	8	0	12	31

== Schedule and results ==
Date	Visitor	Score	Home	Score
January
7	Shamrocks	3	Ottawa	4
14	Quebec	1	Ottawa	3
28	Ottawa	1	Montreal	5
February
4	Victorias	7	Ottawa	5
11	Ottawa	0	Victorias	16
18	Montreal	4	Ottawa	5
March
4	Ottawa	3	Shamrocks	7
‡	Ottawa		Quebec	

‡ defaulted to Ottawa

== Player statistics ==
=== Goaltending averages ===
Name	Club	GP	GA	SO	Avg.
Bouse Hutton	2	11		5.5	
Fred Chittick	5	32		6.4	

=== Scoring Leaders ===
Name	GP	G
Mac Roger	5	6
H. Henry	3	4
Chauncy Kirby	7	4
F. White	4	2
Hod Stuart	3	1
Bruce Stuart	1	1
N. Nolan	1	1
Weldy Young	1	1

== See also ==
- 1899 CAHL season
