= 1885 Ottawa Hockey Club season =

Season of play of ice hockey team

1885 Ottawa Hockey Club
- 1885 record: 1-1-1
- Road record: 1-1-1

Team information
- Coach: None
- Arena: Dey's Skating Rink

The 1885 Ottawa Hockey Club season was the club's second of play. The club played in the Montreal tournament.

== Team business ==
The team held its annual meeting on November 18, 1884 at the Metropolitan Athletic Club. Frank Jenkins was named captain, John Kerr treasurer, E. L. Taylor secretary, and William Kerr, president.

The club moved its practices to the new Dey's Skating Rink, which was electrically lit. The club adopted the colours of gold and blue for their uniforms.

== Season ==
The club played in the Montreal Winter Carnival Tournament. Games were held at the Crystal Rink. William O'Dell was goaltender, replacing Albert Low, who was on a survey expedition. Ottawa placed second to the Montreal Hockey Club.

#	Date	Series	Opponent	Score	Decision	Record
1	January 28, 1885	Carnival	Montreal Victorias	2–1	W	1–0–0
2	January 30, 1885	Carnival	Montreal Hockey Club	2–2	T	1–0–1
3	January 31, 1885	Carnival	Montreal Hockey Club	0–1	L	1–1–1

== Roster ==
G. Currier, Thomas D. Green, Thomas Gallagher, Frank Jenkins(captain), Jack Kerr, Halder Kirby, William O'Dell(goal)
