= 1900–01 Ottawa Hockey Club season =

Canadian ice hockey club season

1900–01 Ottawa Hockey Club
- League: 1st CAHL
- 1900–01 record: 7–0–1
- Home record: 3–0–1
- Road record: 4–0–0

Team information
- Coach: Alf Smith
- Captain: Harvey Pulford
- Arena: Dey's Skating Rink

Team leaders
- Goals: Harold Henry (8)
- Goals against average: Fred Chittick (0.00)

The 1900–01 Ottawa Hockey Club season was the team's 16th season of play. The club won the 1901 Canadian Amateur Hockey League (CAHL) championship but did not challenge for the Stanley Cup.

== Regular season ==
The club went undefeated through the season, but because the Montreal Shamrocks lost a Stanley Cup challenge to the Winnipeg Victorias, Ottawa did not win the Cup as a result of league play. At first, Ottawa was intending to challenge Winnipeg for the Cup, but on February 27, 1901, announced that they would not do so that winter. According to Coleman(1966), Ottawa did not issue a challenge due to the "lateness of the season." The Ottawa Journal as reported in The Globe suggested that the Ottawa club was wise in their decision, as they were in "racked condition in which they are, as a result of the immensely hard exertions put forth by them in all their games this season". The Ottawa Hockey Club did not challenge the following season, either.

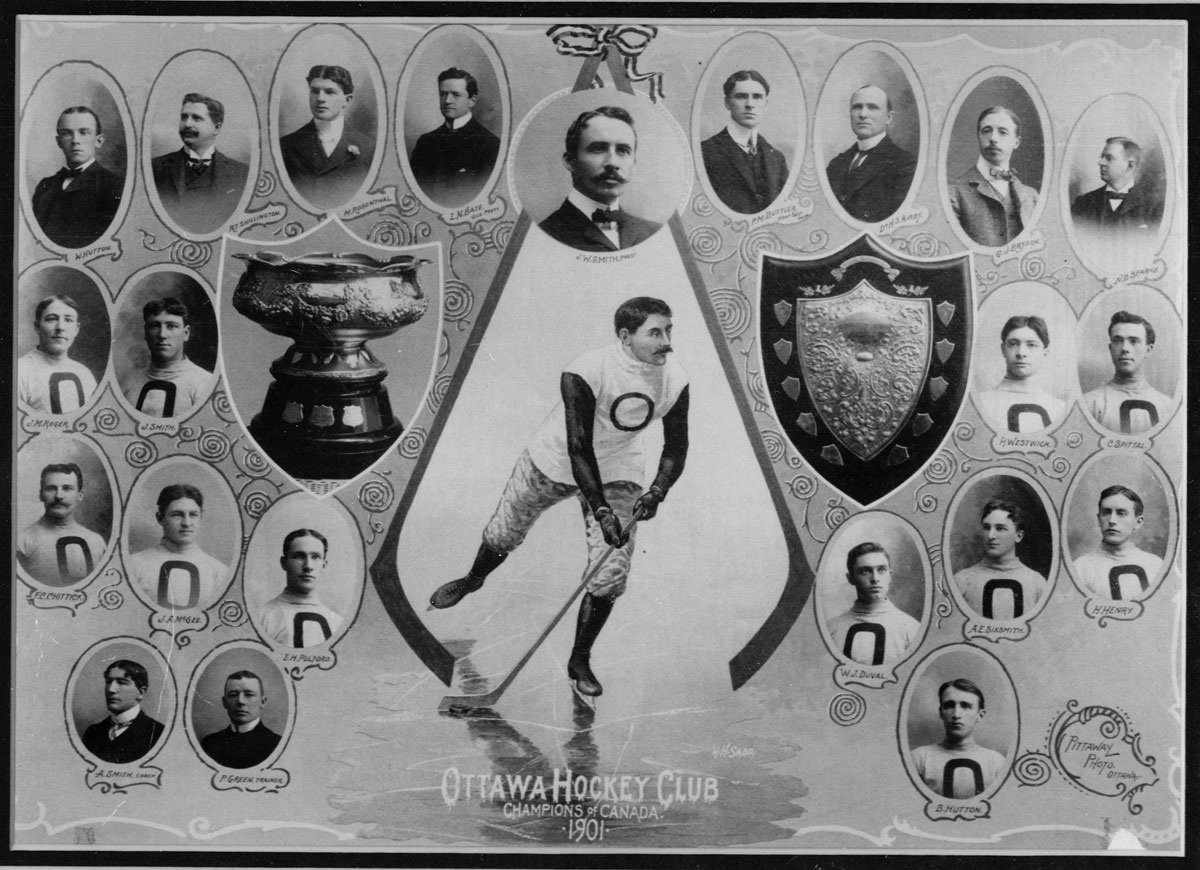
The 1901 Championship club

=== Results ===
Month	Day	Visitor	Score	Home	Score
Jan.	5	Quebec	4	Ottawa	5
Jan.	12	Ottawa	4	Shamrocks	2
Jan.	19	Victorias	2	Ottawa	2 (10' overtime)
Jan.	26	Ottawa	9	Montreal	4
Feb.	2	Montreal	3	Ottawa	5
Feb.	9	Ottawa	5	Victorias	4
Feb.	16	Shamrocks	1	Ottawa	2 (30' overtime)
Feb.	23	Ottawa	1	Quebec	0 (20' overtime)

== Player statistics ==
=== Leading scorers ===
Name	GP	G
Harold Henry	8	8
Arthur Sixsmith	7	7
Harry Westwick	7	6
Jack Smith	4	6
Mac Roger	6	4

=== Goaltending averages ===
Name	GP	GA	SO	Avg.
Hutton, John Bouse	8	20	0	2.50

== Roster ==
- Fred Chittick
- Bouse Hutton
- William Duval
- Herbert Henry
- James "Jim" McGee
- J. Mac Roger
- Arthur E. Sixsmith
- Jack Smith
- Charlie Spittal
- Harvey Pulford
- Harry Westwick

Source: Kitchen (2008), p. 342

== See also ==
- 1901 CAHL season
