= Weldy =

Weldy is a given name and a surname. Notable people with the surname include:

- Weldy Walker (1860–1937), American baseball player
- Weldy Young (1871–1944), Canadian businessman and athlete
- Ann Weldy (born 1932), American author
