= 1909–10 Ottawa Hockey Club season =

Canadian ice hockey club season

1909–10 Ottawa Hockey Club
- Stanley Cup champions
- Division: 2nd NHA
- 1909–10 record: 9–3–0

Team information
- Coach: Pete Green
- Arena: The Arena

Team leaders
- Goals: Marty Walsh (23)
- Wins: Percy LeSueur (9)
- Goals against average: Percy LeSueur (5.5)

The 1909–10 Ottawa Hockey Club season saw the Ottawa Hockey Club secede from the Eastern Canada Hockey Association (ECHA), and join the new Canadian Hockey Association (CHA), only to abandon that group and join the National Hockey Association (NHA) a few weeks later. Ottawa held on to its Stanley Cup championship status through several challenges, only to lose it to the Montreal Wanderers who won the NHA championship.

== Team business ==
The CHA was formed by three teams from the Eastern Canada Hockey Association: Ottawa, Quebec, and the Montreal Shamrocks. They wanted to form a new league after the Montreal Wanderers of the ECHA were sold to new owners that wanted to move the club to the smaller Jubilee Arena. The CHA rejected applications from Wanderers and other teams who then formed their own league, the National Hockey Association (NHA). The backers of the NHA included some very successful businessmen who had much deeper pockets than the CHA owners.

With the two competing leagues, competition for players was fierce. Renfrew wanted to get as many players from Ottawa as it could. While not signing Fred Lake, Dubby Kerr or Marty Walsh, Renfrew was able to sign Cyclone Taylor immediately before the season started. The club threatened Taylor with legal action after he accepted a $50 check from them, but then signed with Renfrew. Edgar Dey left to play with Haileybury.

The CHA folded on January 15, 1910, after only a handful of games were played. Ottawa and the Shamrocks of the CHA were immediately absorbed into the NHA.

As Stanley Cup champions, the Ottawas attempted to arrange three Stanley Cup challenge series which had been accepted by the Stanley Cup trustees. Series with Edmonton and Galt, Ontario, were arranged, but a planned challenge with the Winnipeg Shamrocks was abandoned when Winnipeg wired that they could not keep their team intact. The Ottawas won both the Galt and Edmonton series. Ottawa is considered co-champions of the Stanley Cup in 1910.

== Results ==
CHA

Play started on December 30. After a few games it was clear that fan interest was not there as only 800 fans were recorded for the game between the Nationals and the Shamrocks.

Month	Day	Visitor	Score	Home	Score
Jan.	8	Ottawa	14	Le National	4
Jan.	13	Ottawa	15	All-Montreal	5

NHA

A meeting with the NHA on January 15, 1910, was planned to consider amalgamation with the CHA, but amalgamation was not discussed. Instead the NHA admitted Ottawa and the Shamrocks. The Le National were offered the franchise of Les Canadiens, but declined. No invitation was offered to All-Montreal and Quebec. The CHA ceased operations.

=== Final standings ===
National Hockey Association
	GP	W	L	T	GF	GA
Montreal Wanderers	12	11	1	0	91	41
Ottawa Hockey Club	12	9	3	0	89	66
Renfrew Creamery Kings	12	8	3	1	96	54
Cobalt Silver Kings	12	4	8	0	79	104
Haileybury Hockey Club	12	4	8	0	77	83
Montreal Shamrocks	12	3	8	1	52	95
Les Canadiens	12	2	10	0	59	100

Note: W = Wins, L = Losses, T = Ties, GF= Goals For, GA = Goals Against

=== Results ===
Month	Day	Visitor	Score	Home	Score
Jan.	15	Shamrocks	3	Ottawa	15
Jan.	22	Canadiens	4	Ottawa	6
Jan.	26	Ottawa	8	Canadiens	4
Jan.	29	Haileybury	4	Ottawa	11
Feb.	5	Ottawa	5	Cobalt	4
Feb.	9	Ottawa	8	Haileybury	4
Feb.	12	Renfrew	5	Ottawa	8 (10' over.)
Feb.	19	Ottawa	5	Wanderers	7
Feb.	23	Ottawa	9	Shamrocks	6
Feb.	26	Cobalt	5	Ottawa	11
Mar.	5	Wanderers	3	Ottawa	1
Mar.	8	Ottawa	2	Renfrew	17

== Player statistics ==
=== Goaltending averages ===
Name	GP	GA	SO	Avg.
LeSueur, Percy	12	66	1	5.5

=== Scoring leaders ===
Name	GP	G
Walsh, Marty	11	23
Ridpath, Bruce	12	15

== Stanley Cup Challenges ==
During the CHA season, Ottawa as Cup champion played one challenge in addition to their regular schedule:

=== Ottawa vs. Galt ===
Ottawa played a two-game total goals series against Galt, Ontario, champions of the Ontario Professional Hockey League and prevailed with 12–3 and 3–1 victories. Marty Walsh led Ottawa with 6 goals.

Date	Winning Team	Score	Losing Team	Location
January 5, 1910	Ottawa Hockey Club	12–3	Galt	The Arena
January 7, 1910	Ottawa Hockey Club	3–1	Galt	The Arena
Ottawa wins total goals series 15 goals to 4

January 5
Galt	3	at	Ottawa	12
Hugh Lehman		G	Percy LeSueur
Pete Charlton		P	Fred Lake	1
Rastus Murphy		CP	Ken Mallen
Charles Manson	2	F	Bruce Stuart	2
Jimmy Mallen	2	F	Marty Walsh	|
Art Dusome		F	Hanmby Shore	2
Fred "Doc" Doherty	1	F	Bruce Ridpath	1
Referee – R. Bowie

January 7
Galt	1	at	Ottawa	3
Hugh Lehman		G	Percy LeSueur
Pete Charlton	1	P	Fred Lake	1
Rastus Murphy		CP	Hamby Shore
George "Goldie" Cochrane		F	Bruce Stuart	1
Jimmy Mallen		F	Marty Walsh
Art Dusome		F	Albert "Dubbie" Kerr
Fed "Doc" Doherty		F	Bruce Ridpath	1
Referee – Patrick & Spittal

=== Ottawa vs. Edmonton ===
During the NHA season Ottawa as Cup champion played a challenge against Edmonton in addition to their regular schedule. Edmonton was champion of the Alberta Amateur Hockey Association.

January 18
Edmonton	4	at	Ottawa	8
Jack Winchester		G	Percy LeSueur
William Field		P	Fred Lake
Hugh Ross		CP	Hamby Shore
Fred Whitcroft	2	F	Bruce Stuart	2
Harold Deeton	1	F	Marty Walsh	1
Hay Millar	1	F	Gordon Roberts	4
Bert Boulton		F	Bruce Ridpath	1
Referees – Bowie & Campbell

January 20
Edmonton	7	at	Ottawa	13
Jack Winchester		G	Percy LeSueur
William Field		P	Fred Lake
Hugh Ross		CP	Hamby Shore	1
Fred Whitcroft	3	F	Bruce Stuart	5
Harold Deeton	2	F	Marty Walsh	1
Hay Millar		F	Gordon Roberts	3
Bert Boulton	2	F	Bruce Ridpath	3
Referees – Bowie & Campbell

== Stanley Cup engraving ==
The 1910 Stanley Cup was presented by the trophy's trustee William Foran.

The following Ottawa Hockey Club players and staff were members of the Stanley Cup winning team.

1910 Ottawa Hockey Club Senators

=== Players ===
Centres

- Bruce Stuart(rover)(rover-Captain)
- Walter Smaill(rover)
- Marty Walsh (center)

Wingers

- Albert "Dubbie" Kerr (left wing)
- Bruce Ridpath (right wing)
- Gordon Roberts (left wing)

Defencemen

- Fred Lake (point)
- Ken Mallen (point/cover point)
- Hamilton Hamby Shore (cover point-left wing)

Goaltenders

- Percy LeSueur

=== Coaching and administrative staff ===
- Thomas D'arcy McGee (President)†, Llewellyn Bates (Vice President)†
- Pete Green (Coach)†, Patrick Basketville (Treasurer)†
- Martin Rosenthal (Secretary)†, Mac McGilton (Trainer)†
- Charles Sparks†, Charles Bryson†, Dave Mulligan† (Directors)
- Percy Butler†, Charles Irvin† (Directors)

†known non-playing members of 1910 Ottawa Hockey Club. No team picture of Ottawa in 1910 has been found.

=== Stanley Cup engraving ===
Ottawa engraved "Ottawa 1910" and "OTTAWA vs GALT/OTTAWA vs EDMONTON".

== See also ==
- 1910 NHA season
- List of Stanley Cup champions
