= 1901–02 Ottawa Hockey Club season =

Canadian ice hockey club season

1901–02 Ottawa Hockey Club
- League: 2nd CAHL
- 1901–02 record: 5–3–0
- Home record: 3–1–0
- Road record: 2–2–0

Team information
- Coach: Pete Green
- Captain: William Duval
- Arena: Dey's Skating Rink

Team leaders
- Goals: Harry Westwick (11)
- Goals against average: Bouse Hutton (1.7)

The 1901–02 Ottawa Hockey Club season was the team's 17th season of play. After not challenging for the Stanley Cup after the previous season, no chance presented itself to Ottawa this season. The club finished second to Montreal in CAHL play. Montreal would play and defeat Winnipeg for the Cup.

== Off-season ==
The team held its annual meeting on December 5, 1901. The president was N.C. Sparks, the vice-president was L.N. Bate, and the secretary-treasurer was L.M. Butler. The team announced that it would play exhibitions in Pittsburgh and New York. The provisional roster included Bouse Hutton, Harvey Pulford, Charles Spittal, Frank McGee, Harry Westwick, Hod and Bruce Stuart, Peg Duval and Harold Henry. The trainer was Pete Green and the head coach was Alf Smith. Bruce Stuart returned for the season, after a season with Quebec, while his brother Hod returned to Quebec for the 1901–02 season. McGee would play for the Ottawa Aberdeens in the CAHL's intermediate division. Arthur Fraser played three games for Ottawa.

== Regular season ==
=== Final Standing ===
| Team | Games Played | Wins | Losses | Ties | Goals For | Goals Against |
|---|---|---|---|---|---|---|
| Montreal Hockey Club | 8 | 6 | 2 | 0 | 39 | 15 |
| Ottawa Hockey Club | 8 | 5 | 3 | 0 | 35 | 15 |
| Montreal Victorias | 8 | 4 | 4 | 0 | 36 | 25 |
| Quebec Hockey Club | 8 | 4 | 4 | 0 | 26 | 34 |
| Montreal Shamrocks | 8 | 1 | 7 | 0 | 15 | 62 |

== Schedule and results ==
| Month | Day | Visitor | Score | Home | Score |
|---|---|---|---|---|---|
| Jan. | 5 | Victorias | 4 | Ottawa | 5 |
| Jan. | 11 | Ottawa | 1 | Shamrocks | 2 |
| Jan. | 18 | Montreal | 4 | Ottawa | 2 |
| Jan. | 25 | Ottawa | 1 | Quebec | 2 |
| Feb. | 1 | Shamrocks | 0 | Ottawa | 12 |
| Feb. | 8 | Ottawa | 3 | Victorias | 2 |
| Feb. | 15 | Quebec | 0 | Ottawa | 8 |
| Feb. | 22 | Ottawa | 3 | Montreal | 1 |

== Exhibitions ==
The Ottawa Hockey Club travelled to New York after the season for an exhibition series. Ottawa defeated the Hockey Club of New York 4–3 on March 21, 1902. Ottawa lost to the New York Athletic Club 6–3 on March 23. Both games were at the St. Nicholas Rink.

== Player statistics ==
=== Scorers ===
| Name | GP | G |
|---|---|---|
| Harry Westwick | 8 | 11 |
| Bruce Stuart | 8 | 9 |
| Herbert Henry | 8 | 6 |
| Arthur Fraser | 3 | 4 |
| William Duval | 5 | 2 |
| Charlie Spittal | 5 | 2 |

=== Goaltending averages ===
| Name | GP | GA | SO | Avg. |
|---|---|---|---|---|
| Bouse Hutton | 8 | 15 | 2 | 1.70 |

== Roster ==
- Bouse Hutton
- Aumond,
- Butterworth,
- Chambers,
- William Duval,
- Dave Gilmour,
- Harold Henry,
- Art Moore,
- Harvey Pulford,
- Charlie Spittal,
- Bruce Stuart,
- C. Watts,
- Harry Westwick

Source: Kitchen(2008), pp. 342–343

== See also ==
- 1902 CAHL season
