= 1916–17 Ottawa Senators season =

Canadian ice hockey club season

1916–17 Ottawa Senators
- League: 1st (2nd half) NHA
- 1916–17 record: 7–3–0, 8–2–0
- Goals for: 78
- Goals against: 72

Team information
- General manager: Ted Dey
- Coach: Alf Smith, Eddie Gerard
- Arena: The Arena

Team leaders
- Goals: Frank Nighbor (41)
- Goals against average: Clint Benedict (2.8)

The 1916–17 Ottawa Senators season was the Ottawa Hockey Club's 32nd season of play. This was the 8th and final season of the National Hockey Association. Teams were to play two half-seasons of 10 games each, though this was disrupted. Ottawa won the second half and played off against first-half winner Montreal Canadiens for the NHA title, but lost.

== Team business ==
The Ottawa club wanted to suspend play for the season due to the war, but was voted down.

== Regular season ==
=== Suspending the Blueshirts ===
On February 10, 1917, the Blueshirts played their final game, losing 4–1 at home to Ottawa. The following day, a meeting of the NHA executive in Montreal was held to deal with the 228th Battalion leaving for overseas. Toronto proposed continuing with a five-team league, but the other owners instead voted to suspend Toronto's team. The players were dispersed by a drawing of names. The following day, President Robinson was quoted as stating that the players would return to the club after the season, but he would not guarantee that the club would be allowed to return to play, stating that would be decided at the NHA annual meeting.

=== Continuing the season ===
Ottawa, while not unhappy at the suspension of Toronto, nevertheless lost a game for the use of Cy Denneny in a game against the 228th, and saw the Wanderers and Quebec receive wins for games against the 228th. The club threatened to not play for the rest of the season. However, cooler heads prevailed and Ottawa went back to work.

=== Final standings ===
National Hockey Association
| First Half | GP | W | L | T | GF | GA |
|---|---|---|---|---|---|---|
| Montreal Canadiens | 10 | 7 | 3 | 0 | 58 | 38 |
| Ottawa Senators | 10 | 7 | 3 | 0 | 56 | 41 |
| Toronto 228th Battalion | 10 | 6 | 4 | 0 | 70 | 57 |
| Toronto Hockey Club | 10 | 5 | 5 | 0 | 50 | 45 |
| Montreal Wanderers | 10 | 3 | 7 | 0 | 56 | 72 |
| Quebec Bulldogs | 10 | 2 | 8 | 0 | 43 | 80 |

| Second Half | GP | W | L | T | GF | GA |
|---|---|---|---|---|---|---|
| Ottawa Senators | 10 | 8 | 2 | 0 | 63 | 22 |
| Quebec Bulldogs | 10 | 8 | 2 | 0 | 54 | 46 |
| Montreal Canadiens | 10 | 3 | 7 | 0 | 31 | 42 |
| Montreal Wanderers | 10 | 2 | 8 | 0 | 38 | 65 |

Note: W = Wins, L = Losses, T = Ties, GF= Goals For, GA = Goals Against
After the 228th Battalion dropped out, and Toronto suspended, the schedule was revised so that the remaining teams would play a 20 game schedule of two halves containing 10 games each. Some of the games to that point were moved into the second half. The 'second half' standings therefore include some games that the 228th and Toronto played.

=== Results ===
First half

| Month | Day | Visitor | Score | Home | Score |
|---|---|---|---|---|---|
| Dec. | 27 | Ottawa | 7 | 228th | 10 |
| Dec. | 30 | Canadiens | 1 | Ottawa | 7 |
| Jan. | 3 | Ottawa | 10 | Wanderers | 5 |
| Jan. | 6 | Toronto | 2 | Ottawa | 3 |
| Jan. | 10 | Ottawa | 4 | Quebec | 5 |
| Jan. | 13 | 228th | 1 | Ottawa | 1 |
| Jan. | 17 | Ottawa | 3 | Canadiens | 2 |
| Jan. | 20 | Wanderers | 5 | Ottawa | 8 |
| Jan. | 24 | Ottawa | 5 | Toronto | 8 |
| Jan. | 27 | Quebec | 2 | Ottawa | 7 |

Second half

| Month | Day | Visitor | Score | Home | Score |
|---|---|---|---|---|---|
| Jan. | 31 | 228th | 0 | Ottawa‡ | 8 |
| Feb. | 3 | Ottawa | 2 | Canadiens | 1 |
| Feb. | 7 | Wanderers | 5 | Ottawa | 8 |
| Feb. | 10 | Ottawa | 4 | Toronto | 1 |
| Feb. | 14 | Canadiens | 1 | Ottawa | 4 |
| Feb. | 17 | Ottawa | 2 | Quebec | 3 (16' OT) |
| Feb. | 21 | Ottawa | 5 | Wanderers | 3 |
| Feb. | 24 | Wanderers | 6 | Ottawa | 11 |
| Feb. | 28 | Ottawa | 3 | Canadiens | 1 |
| Mar. | 3 | Quebec | 1 | Ottawa | 16 |

‡ Ottawa lost game on use of ineligible Cy Denneny.
† Wanderers given win for this game in revised second half.
* 228th was ordered overseas. Toronto club was suspended by league.

=== Scoring ===
| Player | Team | GP | G |
|---|---|---|---|
| Frank Nighbor | Ottawa | 19 | 41 |
| Jack Darragh | Ottawa | 20 | 26 |
| Corb Denneny | Toronto / Ottawa | 20 | 19 |
| Eddie Gerard | Ottawa | 19 | 17 |
| Hamby Shore | Ottawa | 19 | 11 |
| George Boucher | Ottawa | 18 | 10 |
| Ed Lowrey | Ottawa | 19 | 3 |
| Cy Denneny | Ottawa | 10 | 3 |
| Horace Merrill | Ottawa | 18 | 1 |
| Ernie Staveneau | Ottawa | 3 | 0 |
| Jack Fournier | Ottawa | 8 | 0 |

=== Leading goaltenders ===
| Name | Club | GP | GA | SO | Avg. |
|---|---|---|---|---|---|
| Clint Benedict | Ottawa | 18 | 50 | 1 | 2.8 |
| Ossie Lang | Ottawa | 1 | 5 | | 5.0 |
| Sam Hebert | Quebec/Ottawa | 15 | 84 | | 5.6 |

== Playoffs ==
| Game-by-Game | | Winning team | Score | Losing team | Location |
|---|---|---|---|---|---|
| 1 | March 7 | Montreal Canadiens | 5–2 | Ottawa Senators | Montreal Arena |
| 2 | March 10 | Ottawa Senators | 4–2 | Montreal Canadiens | The Arena, Ottawa |
Canadiens win two-game playoff 7–6

The Montreal Canadiens won the O'Brien Cup, but lost to the Seattle Metropolitans of the PCHA in the Stanley Cup Final.

== Awards and records ==
- Frank Nighbor – shared scoring title with Joe Malone with 41 goals

== See also ==
- 1916–17 NHA season
