= 1899–1900 Ottawa Hockey Club season =

Canadian ice hockey club season

1900 Ottawa Hockey Club
- League: 3rd CAHL
- 1900 record: 4–4–0
- Goals for: 28
- Goals against: 19

Team information
- Captain: Hod Stuart
- Arena: Dey's Skating Rink

Team leaders
- Goals: Bruce Stuart (11)
- Goals against average: Bouse Hutton (2.7)

The 1899–1900 Ottawa Hockey Club season was the club's 15th season of play. Ottawa placed third in the league.

== Team business ==
Hod Stuart was named captain for the season. Harvey Pulford returned to the club.

== Season ==
=== Final standing ===
Team	Games Played	Wins	Losses	Ties	Goals For	Goals Against
Montreal Shamrocks	8	7	1	0	49	26
Montreal Hockey Club	8	5	3	0	34	36
Ottawa Hockey Club	8	4	4	0	28	19
Montreal Victorias	8	2	6	0	44	55
Quebec Hockey Club	8	2	6	0	33	52

== Schedule and results ==
Month	Day	Visitor	Score	Home	Score
Jan.	6	Shamrocks	5	Ottawa	4
Jan.	13	Ottawa	3	Quebec	2
Jan.	20	Montreal	2	Ottawa	5
Jan.	27	Ottawa	5	Victorias	3
Feb.	10	Victorias	1	Ottawa	11
Feb.	17	Ottawa	0	Montreal	3
Feb.	24	Quebec	3	Ottawa	0
Mar.	3‡	Ottawa		Shamrocks	

‡ defaulted to Shamrocks

== Player statistics ==
=== Goaltending averages ===
Name	GP	GA	SO	Avg.
Bouse Hutton	7	19	0	2.70

=== Scorers ===
Name	GP	G
Bruce Stuart	5	11
H. Nolan	5	5
Hod Stuart	7	5
Mac Roger	7	3
Willam Duval	5	2
Herbert Henry	7	2

== See also ==
- 1900 CAHL season
