= 1897–98 Ottawa Hockey Club season =

Canadian ice hockey club season

1897–98 Ottawa Hockey Club
- League: 5th AHAC
- 1897–98 record: 2–6–0

Team information
- Captain: Harvey Pulford
- Arena: Rideau Skating Rink

Team leaders
- Goals: H. Hutchison (8)
- Goals against average: Fred Chittick (5.3)

The 1897–98 Ottawa Hockey Club season was the club's 13th season of play. Ottawa placed fifth in the league.

== Team business ==
Directors

- Governor General The Earl of Minto – Patron
- Wilfrid Laurier – Vice-patron
- David Maclaren – Honorary president
- A. Z. Palmer – Honorary vice-president
- S. Maynard Rogers – President
- Col. Charles E. Turner – Vice-president
- George P. Spittal – Honorary Secretary
- W. C. Sparks – Honorary Treasurer
- Harvey Pulford – Captain
- George P. Murphy, L. M. Bates, S. Ogilve – Executive committee

Source: "Ottawa Club's Officers". The Globe. November 13, 1897. p. 22.

After not coming to satisfactory terms with the Dey brothers over the Dey Rink, the Ottawas returned to their first home, the Rideau Skating Rink for the season.

== Season ==
Ottawa lost several players from the previous season to the rival intermediate Ottawa Capitals, including Alf Smith. The Capitals would win the AHAC intermediate championship with the Ottawa players and apply to join AHAC seniors in 1898.

=== Highlights ===
The game of February 12, 1898, between Ottawa and the Victorias was notable because Fred Chittick, the regular goalkeeper of Ottawa staged a one-man strike because he had not received his share of complimentary tickets. Ottawa played A. Cope instead and lost 9–5. The fans in attendance heckled the defence pair of Harvey Pulford and Weldy Young, and in response Mr. Young went into the crowd to attack a spectator.

=== Final standing ===
Team	Games Played	Wins	Losses	Ties	Goals For	Goals Against
Montreal Victorias	8	8	0	0	53	33
Montreal	8	5	3	0	34	21
Montreal Shamrocks	8	3	5	0	25	36
Quebec	8	2	6	0	29	35
Ottawa	8	2	6	0	28	44

== Schedule and results ==
Day	Visitor	Score	Home	Score	Record
January
8	Ottawa	1	Shamrocks	2	0–1
15	Ottawa	4	Quebec	3	1–1
29	Montreal	4	Ottawa	3	1–2
February
5	Ottawa	6	Victorias	12	1–3
12	Victorias	9	Ottawa	5	1–4
19	Ottawa	2	Montreal	6	1–5
26	Quebec	5	Ottawa	6	2–5
March
5	Shamrocks	3	Ottawa	1	2–6

=== Goaltending averages ===
Name	GP	GA	SO	Avg.
Chittick, Fred	4	21		5.3
Cope, A.	4	23		5.8

=== Scoring Leaders ===
Name	GP	G
Hutchison, Howard	8	8
White, Fred	6	7
Spittal, Charles	7	5
Living, Alf	5	3
Young, Weldy	8	2

== Roster ==
- Fred Chittick – goal
- A. Cope - goal
- Patrick Baskerville
- Dave Gilmour
- Howard Hutchison
- Alf Living
- Harvey Pulford
- Harold Rosenthal
- Charlie Spittal
- Harry Westwick
- Fred White
- Weldy Young

== See also ==
- 1898 AHAC season
