= 1907–08 Ottawa Hockey Club season =

Canadian ice hockey season

1907–08 Ottawa Hockey Club
- League: 2nd ECAHA
- 1907–08 record: 7–3–0

Team information
- Coach: Alf Smith
- Captain: Harvey Pulford
- Arena: Dey's Arena

Team leaders
- Goals: Marty Walsh (21)
- Goals against average: Percy LeSueur (5.1)

The 1907–08 Ottawa Hockey Club season lasted from December 29, 1907, until March 7, 1908. Ottawa Hockey Club finished second in the ECAHA regular season.

== Regular season ==
There was a large amount of player turnover. Harry Smith and Hamby Shore moved to Winnipeg. This was Cyclone Taylor's first season for Ottawa and Tom Phillips and Marty Walsh joined the team. Walsh and Russell Bowie of Victorias tied for the scoring championship with 28 goals apiece. This was the fifth time in ten seasons that Mr. Bowie would lead scorers.

=== Highlights ===
Ottawa opened their new arena, hosting the Wanderers on January 11, 1908, overloading capacity with 7,100 attending. Ottawa defeated the Wanderers 12–2. Ottawa and Wanderers were tied for first going into their rematch on February 29, when the Ottawa manager J. P. Dickson resigned in a dispute over which train to take to Montreal. At the time, two trains were available for the trip, and the two would race, with betting taking place on the winner. In the game, the two defence stars Art Ross and Taylor would lead end-to-end rushes, and the game would be tied until Taylor was injured and Bruce Stuart and Walter Smaill would score for the Wanderers to win 4–2.

Marty Walsh would have the biggest game of the season, scoring seven goals in a game, and six in another. Tom Phillips would score five twice.

=== Final standing ===
Team	Games Played	Wins	Losses	Ties	Goals For	Goals Against
Montreal Wanderers	10	8	2	0	63	52
Ottawa Hockey Club	10	7	3	0	86	51
Quebec Hockey Club	10	5	5	0	81	74
Montreal Shamrocks	10	5	5	0	53	49
Montreal Victorias	10	4	6	0	73	78
Montreal Hockey Club	10	3	7	0	58	83

== Schedule and results ==
1908

Month	Day	Visitor	Score	Home	Score
Jan.	4	Ottawa	1	Quebec	8
Jan.	11	Wanderers	2	Ottawa	12
Jan.	18	Ottawa	3	Shamrocks	4 (2' overtime)
Jan.	25	Victorias	9	Ottawa	14
Feb.	1	Ottawa	14	Montreal	7
Feb.	8	Quebec	5	Ottawa	11
Feb.	15	Ottawa	10	Victorias	4
Feb.	22	Shamrocks	2	Ottawa	5
Feb.	29	Ottawa	2	Wanderers	4
Mar.	7	Ottawa	14	Montreal	6

On March 14, Ottawa played the Winnipeg Maple Leafs in a friendly match at the Arena. The Maple Leafs won the game 7–4. Future Senator Fred Lake played for Winnipeg, scoring two goals. Former and future Senator Hamby Shore also played for Winnipeg, scoring one goal.

== Player statistics ==
=== Goaltending averages ===
Name	GP	GA	SO	Avg.
Percy LeSueur	10	51		5.1

=== Leading scorers ===
Name	Club	GP	G
Walsh, Marty	Ottawa	9	28
Phillips, Tom	Ottawa	10	26
Smith, Alf	Ottawa	9	13

== See also ==
- 1907–08 ECAHA season
