= 1910–11 Ottawa Hockey Club season =

Hockey club season

1910–11 Ottawa Hockey Club
- Stanley Cup champions
- O'Brien Trophy winners
- 1910–11 record: 13–3–0
- Home record: 7–1–0
- Road record: 6–2–0
- Goals for: 122
- Goals against: 69

Team information
- General manager: R. R. Boon
- Coach: Pete Green
- Captain: Marty Walsh
- Arena: The Arena
- Average attendance: 4,500

Team leaders
- Goals: Marty Walsh (37)
- Wins: Percy LeSueur (13)
- Goals against average: Percy LeSueur (4.3)

The 1910–11 Ottawa Hockey Club season was the club's 26th season, second in the National Hockey Association. Ottawa won the league championship for the O'Brien Cup and took over the Stanley Cup from the Montreal Wanderers.

== Regular season ==
The team opened the season with ten consecutive wins, not losing until February in Renfrew. This matched the club record of ten consecutive wins set in 1909–10. Marty Walsh and "Dubbie" Kerr led the league in goals with 37 and 32.

=== Final standings ===
National Hockey Association
	GP	W	L	T	GF	GA
Ottawa Hockey Club	16	13	3	0	122	69
Montreal Canadiens	16	8	8	0	66	62
Renfrew Creamery Kings	16	8	8	0	91	101
Montreal Wanderers	16	7	9	0	73	88
Quebec Bulldogs	16	4	12	0	65	97

Note: W = Wins, L = Losses, T = Ties, GF = Goals for, GA = Goals against

== Schedule and results ==
No.	Date	Visitor	Score	Home	Score	Record
	December					
1	31	Ottawa	5	Canadiens	3	1–0
	January					
2	7	Wanderers	5	Ottawa	10	2–0
3	10	Ottawa	5	Renfrew	4	3–0
4	14	Quebec	5	Ottawa	13	4–0
5	21	Canadiens	4	Ottawa	5 (overtime)	5–0
6	24	Renfrew	5	Ottawa	19	6–0
7	28	Ottawa	8	Wanderers	2	7–0
	February					
8	4	Ottawa	6	Quebec	4	8–0
9	11	Wanderers	4	Ottawa	9	9–0
10	18	Ottawa	7	Quebec	2	10–0
11	24	Ottawa	7	Renfrew	8	10–1
12	28	Quebec	2	Ottawa	6	11–1
	March					
13	2	Ottawa	7	Wanderers	11	11–2
14	4	Renfrew	7	Ottawa	6	11–3
15	8	Ottawa	4	Canadiens	3	12–3
16	10	Canadiens	0	Ottawa	5	13–3

== Player statistics ==
=== Goaltending averages ===
Name	Club	GP	GA	SO	Avg.
Percy LeSueur	Ottawa	16	69	1	4.3

=== Leading scorers ===
Name	Club	GP	G
Marty Walsh	Ottawa	16	37
"Dubbie" Kerr	Ottawa	16	32
Bruce Ridpath	Ottawa	16	22
Jack Darragh	Ottawa	16	18

== Stanley Cup challenges ==
Ottawa played two challenges after the season at The Arena in Ottawa.

=== Galt vs. Ottawa ===
Five members of the Galt team were from the Ottawa area or had played for Ottawa: Hague, Baird, Murphy, Smith and Berlinguette. Odds given before the game had Ottawa as 3–1 favourites. Bruce Ridpath who had been knocked out in the final game of the season played in the challenge game. Only 2,500 attended the game, which was described as a 'poor exhibition' with 'water covering the ice in several places.' Ottawa led 5–0 before Galt scored two. The teams traded goals to the finish to make the final 7–4.

March 13, 1911
Galt	4	at	Ottawa	7
Billy Hague		G	Percy LeSueur
Billy Baird		P	Fred Lake	1
Mike Murphy		CP	Hamby Shore
Tommy Smith	1	F	Jack Darragh
Ken Mallen		F	Marty Walsh	3
Louis Berlinguette	2	F	Bruce Ridpath	2
Fred "Doc" Doherty	1	F	"Dubbie" Kerr	1

Referee: Russell Bowie Umpire: Duncan Campbell

=== Port Arthur vs. Ottawa ===
Marty Walsh was a "one-man wrecking crew", scoring ten goals against Port Arthur.

March 16, 1911
Port Arthur	4	at	Ottawa	13
Herman Zeigler		G	Percy LeSueur
Paddy McDonough		P	Fred Lake
Eddie Carpenter	1	CP	Hamby Shore
Jack Walker	1	F	Jack Darragh
Mickey O'Leary		F	Marty Walsh	10
Willard McGregor	1	F	Bruce Ridpath	2
Wes Wellington	1	F	"Dubbie" Kerr	1

== See also ==
- 1910–11 NHA season
- 1910 in sports
- 1911 in sports
- List of Stanley Cup champions

Preceded by Montreal Wanderers; March 1910	Ottawa Hockey Club; Stanley Cup Cchampions; 1911	Succeeded by Quebec Bulldogs; 1912
