= Hay Millar =

Canadian ice hockey player

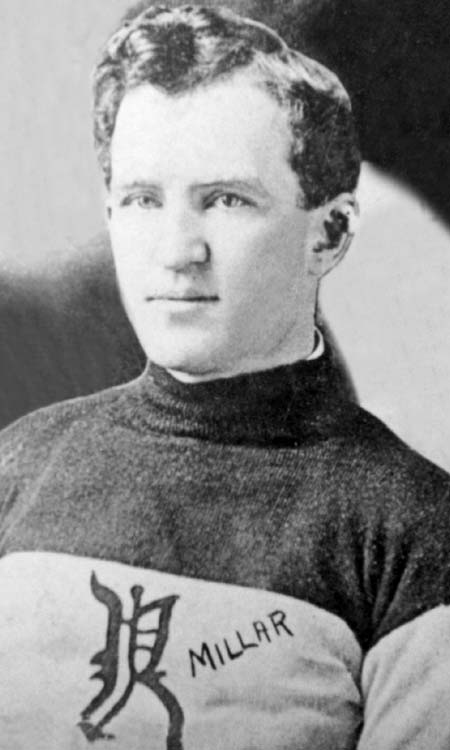
- Born: June 22, 1883 Keene, Ontario, Canada
- Died: June 15, 1944 (aged 60) Hand Hills, Alberta, Canada
- Height: 5 ft 10 in (178 cm)
- Weight: 180 lb (82 kg; 12 st 12 lb)
- Position: Left wing
- Shot: Left
- Played for: Edmonton Pros; Renfrew Creamery Kings
- Playing career: 1907–1911

John James "Jack, Hay" Miller, last name occasionally spelt as Millar, (June 22, 1883 – June 15, 1944) was a Canadian amateur and professional ice hockey player. He played with the Renfrew Creamery Kings of the National Hockey Association, in the 1909–10 season. Previously, he played in the Ontario Hockey Association with Norwood, and in the Alberta Professional Hockey League with the Edmonton Pros. After his season in Renfrew, he returned to Alberta to play for the Stettler Hockey Club. He died in July 1944.
