= 1915–16 Ottawa Senators season =

Canadian ice hockey club season

1915–16 Ottawa Senators
- League: 2nd NHA
- 1915–16 record: 13–11–0
- Goals for: 78
- Goals against: 72

Team information
- Coach: Alf Smith
- Arena: The Arena

Team leaders
- Goals: Frank Nighbor (19)
- Goals against average: Clint Benedict (3.0)

The 1915–16 Ottawa Senators season was the Ottawa Hockey Club's 31st season of play. After winning the NHA championship in 1915, the Senators failed to defend the championship, which was won by the Montreal Canadiens.

== Team business ==
Frank Nighbor, who had played for Vancouver in the Stanley Cup signed with Ottawa, starting a long-time association. The Senators were accused of trying to sign Cyclone Taylor to return to Ottawa while signed with Vancouver, part of an ongoing 'war' with the Pacific Coast Hockey Association. Taylor, who would remain in Vancouver, was considered Wanderers' property by its manager Sam Lichtenhein. Hamby Shore held out and did not sign with the club until December 29.

== Regular season ==
=== Highlights ===
On February 23, 1916, Gordon Roberts of the Wanderers drew a match penalty for cutting Ottawa's Frank Nighbor in a game in Montreal. On the next visit of the Wanderers to Ottawa, Roberts was pelted with bottles from the Ottawa fans.

Billy Gilmour, a former star with Ottawa in the "Silver Seven" era, played two games with Ottawa, scoring one goal.

=== Final standings ===
National Hockey Association
	GP	W	L	T	GF	GA
Montreal Canadiens	24	16	7	1	104	76
Ottawa Senators	24	13	11	0	78	72
Quebec Bulldogs	24	10	12	2	91	98
Montreal Wanderers	24	10	14	0	90	116
Toronto Hockey Club	24	9	14	1	97	98

Note: W = Wins, L = Losses, T = Ties, GF= Goals For, GA = Goals Against

=== Results ===
Month	Day	Visitor	Score	Home	Score
Dec.	22	Toronto	1	Ottawa	7
Dec.	25	Ottawa	2	Quebec	3
Dec.	29	Ottawa	0	Wanderers	4
Jan.	1	Canadiens	4	Ottawa	2
Jan.	8	Quebec	2	Ottawa	4
Jan.	12	Ottawa	0	Toronto	1
Jan.	15	Ottawa	5	Canadiens	2
Jan.	17	Wanderers	7	Ottawa	3
Jan.	25	Ottawa	6	Quebec	3
Jan.	26	Toronto	1	Ottawa	2
Jan.	29	Ottawa	5	Wanderers	4
Feb.	2	Quebec	0	Ottawa	4
Feb.	7	Wanderers	1	Ottawa	3
Feb.	9	Ottawa	2	Canadiens	3 (7'20" OT)
Feb.	12	Canadiens	3	Ottawa	1
Feb.	16	Ottawa	1	Toronto	3
Feb.	19	Toronto	2	Ottawa	5
Feb.	23	Ottawa	4	Wanderers	3
Feb.	26	Ottawa	2	Toronto	9
Feb.	28	Wanderers	2	Ottawa	6
Mar.	8	Quebec	5	Ottawa	8
Mar.	11	Ottawa	1	Canadiens	4
Mar.	13	Ottawa	4	Quebec	0
Mar.	15	Canadiens	5	Ottawa	1

=== Scoring leaders ===
Player	Team	GP	G
Frank Nighbor	Ottawa	23	19
Jack Darragh	Ottawa	21	16

=== Leading Goaltenders ===
Name	Club	GP	GA	SO	Avg.
Clint Benedict	Ottawa	24	72	1	3.0

== See also ==
- 1915–16 NHA season
