= Ernie Staveneau =

Canadian ice hockey player

- Born: February 6, 1893 Arnprior, Ontario, Canada
- Died: July 22, 1949 (aged 56) Arnprior, Ontario, Canada
- Height: 5 ft 10 in (178 cm)
- Weight: 200 lb (91 kg; 14 st 4 lb)
- Position: Right wing
- Shot: Right
- Played for: Ottawa Senators
- Playing career: 1912–1918

Ernest Robert "Hank" Staveneau (or Stavenow, per Albert Street Cemetery gravestone in Arnprior) (February 6, 1893 – July 22, 1949) was a Canadian professional ice hockey player. He played with the Ottawa Senators of the National Hockey Association during the 1915–16 and 1916–17 seasons.
