= 1913–14 Ottawa Senators season =

Canadian ice hockey club season

1913–14 Ottawa Senators
- League: 4th NHA
- 1913–14 record: 11–9–0
- Home record: 7–3–0
- Road record: 4–6–0
- Goals for: 65
- Goals against: 71

Team information
- General manager: Percy Lesueur
- Coach: Alf Smith
- Arena: The Arena

Team leaders
- Goals: Jack Darragh (22)
- Goals against average: Clint Benedict (3.3)

The 1913–14 Ottawa Senators season was the 29th season of the Ottawa Hockey Club, sixth season of the National Hockey Association (NHA). Ottawa placed fourth in the NHA, and did not qualify for the playoffs.

== Team business ==
The team signed a two-year deal to return to The Arena. The team was the prime tenant, with games on Wednesdays and Saturdays, and practice time on Tuesdays and Thursdays and more time if needed.

The season was profitable for the club. Receipts were recorded as $25,000, allowing the club to pay off a $4,000 debt from the previous season and record a $3,000 surplus.

== Pre-season ==
Lichtenhein of the Wanderers offered to sell Harry Hyland to Ottawa for $1,500, but was turned down. The team sold the contracts of Fred Lake, Joe Dennison and Clint Benedict to the Toronto Ontarios. Although there was doubt the players would report, Lake and Dennison played for the Ontarios while Benedict returned to the Senators. Allan Wilson was signed as a free agent away from the Maritime Hockey League. A deal was made to ship Skene Ronan to Vancouver for Carl Kendall but Ronan refused to go and turned down all offers from the Vancouver owners.

== Regular season ==
=== Highlights ===
Ottawa put together a seven-game winning streak but it was not enough as the Canadiens, Toronto and Quebec placed ahead of Ottawa. Percy LeSueur played well in a splitting of the goaltender duties with Clint Benedict, but the team did not have enough offence, scoring only 65 goals in 20 games.

=== Final standings ===
National Hockey Association
	GP	W	L	T	P	GF	GA
Toronto Hockey Club	20	13	7	0	26	93	65
Montreal Canadiens	20	13	7	0	26	85	65
Quebec Bulldogs	20	12	8	0	24	111	73
Ottawa Senators	20	11	9	0	22	65	71
Montreal Wanderers	20	7	13	0	14	102	125
Toronto Ontarios	20	4	16	0	8	61	118

Note: W = Wins, L = Losses, T = Ties, P = Points, GF= Goals For, GA = Goals Against

== Schedule and results ==
Month	Day	Visitor	Score	Home	Score	Record
Dec.	27	Quebec	3	Ottawa	2	0–1
Dec.	30	Ottawa	2	Ontarios	3	0–2
Jan.	3	Wanderers	3	Ottawa	8	1–2
Jan.	7	Canadiens	0	Ottawa	6	2–2
Jan.	10	Ottawa	3	Toronto	2 (20' overtime)	3–2
Jan.	14	Ontarios	5	Ottawa	6	4–2
Jan.	17	Ottawa	7	Wanderers	1	5–2
Jan.	21	Ottawa	3	Canadiens	2	6–2
Jan.	24	Toronto	1	Ottawa	4	7–2
Jan.	28	Ottawa	1	Quebec	7	7–3
Jan.	31	Quebec	3	Ottawa	4	8–3
Feb.	4	Ottawa	1	Toronto	2	8–4
Feb.	7	Wanderers	4	Ottawa	2	8–5
Feb.	11	Ontarios	1	Ottawa	3	9–5
Feb.	14	Ottawa	0	Canadiens	1 (6'40" overtime)	9–6
Feb.	18	Toronto	4	Ottawa	1	9–7
Feb.	21	Ottawa	3	Wanderers	12	9–8
Feb.	25	Canadiens	5	Ottawa	6 (30' overtime)	9–9
Feb.	28	Ottawa	3	Ontarios	2	10–9
Mar.	4	Ottawa	0	Quebec	10	10–10

=== Goaltending averages ===
Name	Club	GP	GA	SO	Avg.
Benedict, Clint	Ottawa	7	23		3.3
LeSueur, Percy	Ottawa	13	48	1	3.7

=== Scoring leaders ===
Name	GP	G
Jack Darragh	20	23
Skene Ronan	18	18
Harry Broadbent	17	6
Jack Darragh	11	6
Hamby Shore	17	6

== Playoffs ==
The Senators did not qualify for the playoffs.

The Vancouver Millionaires came east for exhibition games, playing in Ottawa on March 7, 1914, defeating Ottawa 7–3 with former Ottawa star Fred Taylor excelling for Vancouver.

== See also ==
- 1913–14 NHA season
