= Fred Chittick =

Canadian ice hockey player

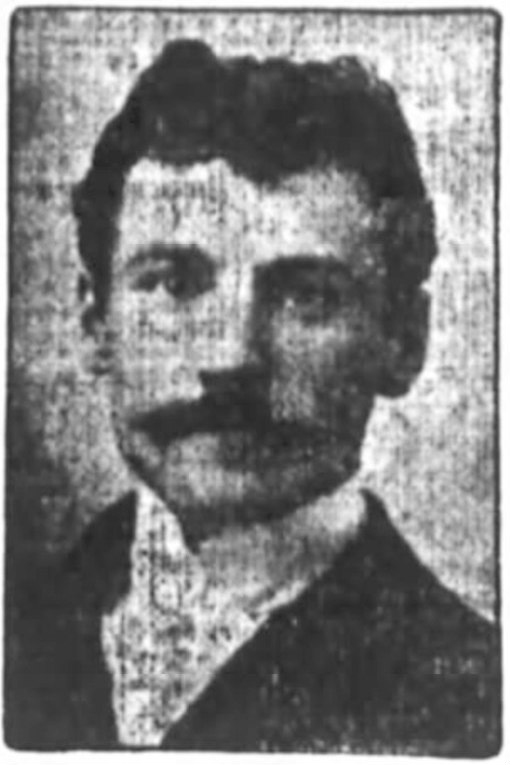
- Photo from April 19, 1905 issue of Ottawa Journal
- Born: April 5, 1868 Ottawa, Ontario, Canada
- Died: August 24, 1917 (aged 49) Ottawa, Ontario, Canada
- Position: Goaltender
- Played for: Ottawa Hockey Club
- Playing career: 1894–1901

Frederick Charles Chittick (April 5, 1868 – August 24, 1917) was a Canadian ice hockey goaltender for the Ottawa Hockey Club from 1894 until 1901. He was also a track and field athlete and a rugby football player.

== Playing career ==
Born in Ottawa, Ontario, Canada, Chittick first joined the Ottawa Hockey Club of the Amateur Hockey Association of Canada (AHAC) for the 1895 season, taking over from Albert Morel as the starting goaltender. He played seven seasons for Ottawa, before retiring from play after the 1901 season, the season in which Ottawa won the Canadian Amateur Hockey League (successor from AHAC) championship. He would stay in the game as a referee.

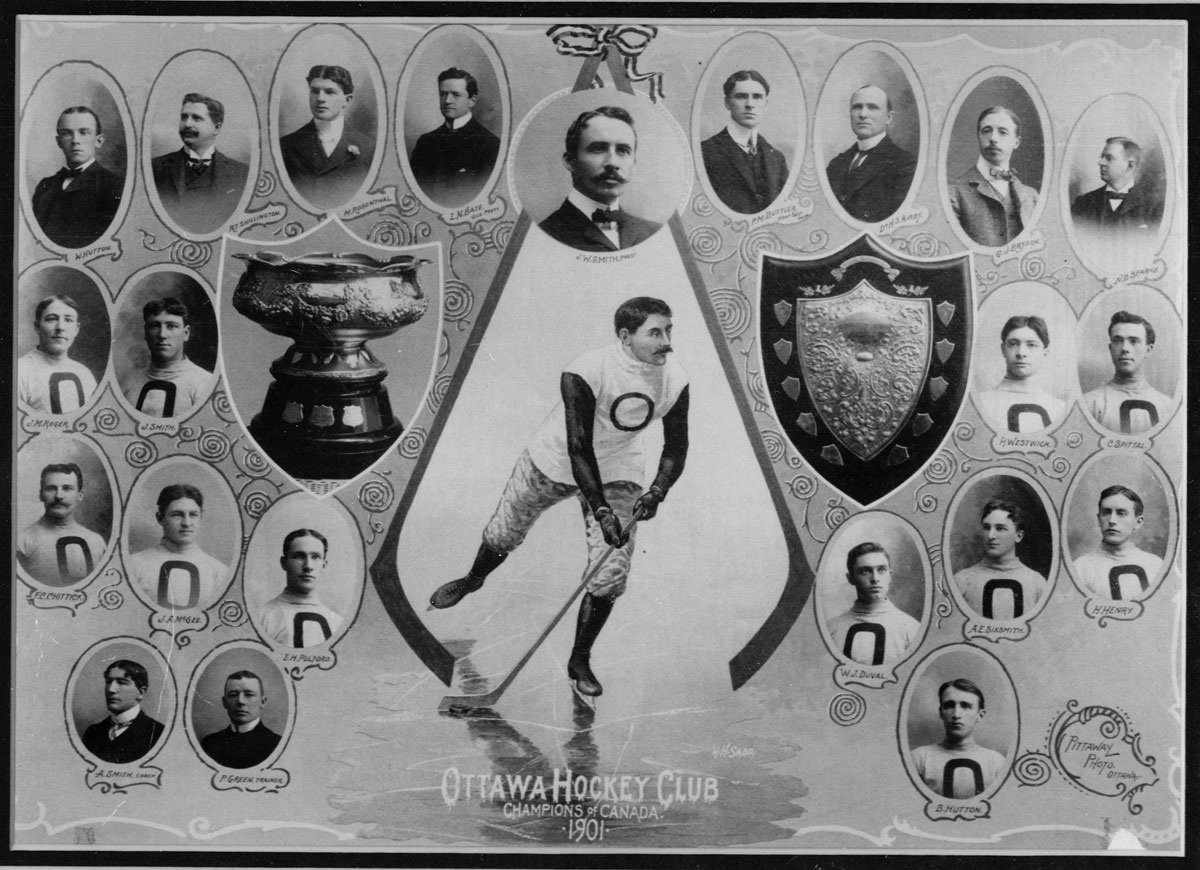
Fred Chittick, at far left in the second row from the bottom, with the Ottawa Hockey Club in 1901.

In 1899, Chittick quit the Ottawas over a series of events. On January 21, Chittick was refereeing a game between Quebec Hockey Club and Montreal Hockey Club when the Montreal team quit the game, incensed at the rough play of Quebec and the fact that Chittick was allowing the rough play. After the game, allegations were made by the Montreal players that Chittick was drunk. Chittick was mad enough to threaten the Montreal players with defamation lawsuits. A month later, on February 11 in Montreal, Chittick gave up 16 goals, the worst showing by a senior goaltender to that date. Chittick was replaced for the next game and he quit in anger. He later spoke to the press about the club paying its players to pay, causing a scandal. He would not be the club's regular goaltender again, although he did play a game for the club as a replacement in 1900.

Chittick was employed as an accountant in the Canadian Department of Agriculture at the annual salary of $950 in the 1890s. He died at his Ottawa home in 1917.

=== Career statistics ===
			Regular season								Playoffs
Season	Team	League	GPI	W	L	T	MIN	GA	SO	GAA	GPI	W	L	T	MIN	GA	SO	GAA
1895	Ottawa HC	AHAC	6	3	3	0	360	18	1	3.0
1896	Ottawa HC	AHAC	8	6	2	0	480	16	1	2.0
1897	Ottawa HC	AHAC	8	5	3	0	480	18	1	2.3
1898	Ottawa HC	AHAC	4	1	3	0	240	21	0	5.0
1899	Ottawa HC	CAHL	5	2	3	0	300	32	0	6.4
1900	Ottawa HC	CAHL	1	1	0	0	80	0	1	0.0

Preceded by Chauncy Kirby	Ottawa Senators captain (Original Era); 1896–1897	Succeeded by Harvey Pulford
