= Thomas D. Green =

Canadian ice hockey player

Thomas Green
- Born: Thomas Daniel Green; December 21, 1857 near Brantford, Ontario
- Died: November 29, 1935 (aged 77); Rocky Mountain House, Alberta
- Citizenship: Canadian
- Occupations: ice hockey player, ice hockey executive, engineer and surveyor

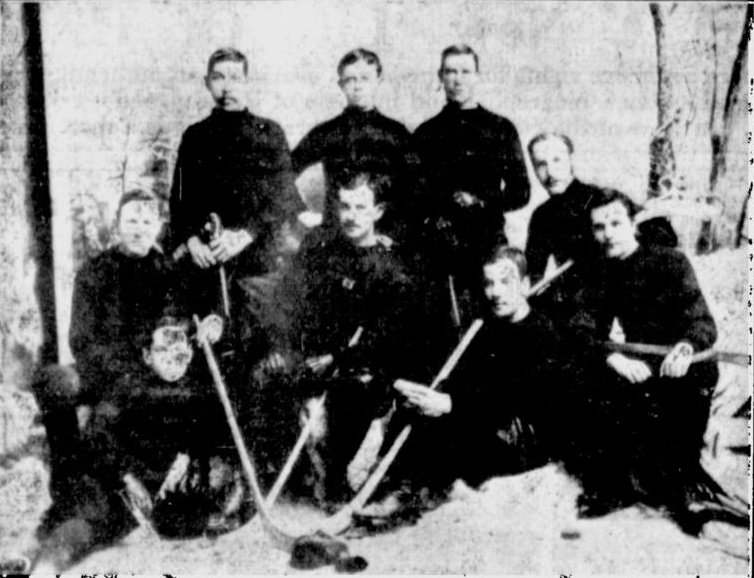
Green, at left in the back row, with the 1883–84 Ottawa Hockey Club.

Thomas Daniel Green (December 21, 1857 near Brantford, Ontario – November 29, 1935 in Rocky Mountain House, Alberta) was an early Canadian amateur ice hockey player, ice hockey executive, engineer and surveyor. He was a Mohawk, possibly the first Mohawk accredited land surveyor in Canada. Because of his Mohawk status, he faced discrimination seeking full-time work with the Government of Canada.

== Biography ==
Born the youngest of six children to Daniel Green & Mary (Crawford) Green in Alford, Ontario, outside of the Six Nations of the Grand River First Nation lands, He attended the Mohawk Institute in Brantford, His success at the Indian Residential School led Robert Ashton, the Superintendent, to recommend, after two years at the school, that he write the entrance exam for Brantford High School. In 1875, Thomas obtained the highest grade of all the forty-one applicants from the public schools in Brant County.

He tutored other students to raise money to attend McGill College in Montreal, Quebec, graduating with a B.Sc. in 1880. He is first noted playing hockey for the 1883 Montreal Winter Carnival Tournament winners McGill, where he was studying engineering. After completing his studies in Montreal, he moved to Ottawa, Ontario seeking work with the Canadian federal government. He succeeded only in receiving temporary work with the Dominion Land Survey, his hiring to a permanent position blocked by A. M. Burgess, the deputy minister of the Interior, although he was recommended by Prime Minister John A. Macdonald.

In Ottawa, he joined the Ottawa Hockey Club in time to play in their first competitive season of 1883–84. In 1886, he became the first president of the Amateur Hockey Association of Canada, considered the first organized ice hockey league.

Green eventually left Ottawa and became a land surveyor in Ontario. He moved west and surveyed mines in the Yukon, town sites in Alberta and rail lines in Western Canada.

Preceded by Frank Jenkins	Ottawa Senators captain (Original Era); 1886–87	Succeeded by Frank Jenkins
