= Jack Kerr (ice hockey) =

Canadian ice hockey player and athlete

Jack (John) Kerr
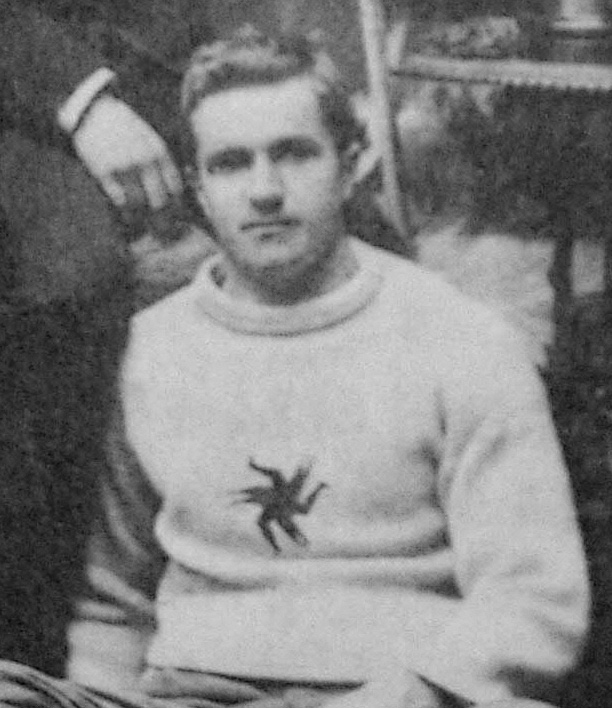
- Member of 1891 championship team
- Born: 5 October 1863; Ottawa, Canada West
- Died: 16 February 1933 (aged 69); Ottawa, Ontario, Canada
- Position: Forward
- Playing career: 1883–1893

John Kerr (1863–1933) was a Canadian ice hockey player and athlete. He was one of the founders of the Ottawa Hockey Club for which he played from 1883 onwards. He was a member of the Ontario championship team in 1891, 1892, 1893 and the Canadian championship team of 1892. He played the forward position.

== Hockey career ==
Along with Halder Kirby, Kerr was visiting Montreal during the 1883 Montreal Winter Carnival where he witnessed games of the outdoor hockey tournament. According to the Ottawa Citizen, one said to the other "that we could beat those fellows" and the other agreed. The two, upon their return to Ottawa, organized the Ottawa Hockey Club along with Frank Jenkins.

Kerr would play with Ottawa until the 1893 season, winning several Ottawa and Ontario championships and winning the Canadian championship in 1892. Kerr is also credited with manufacturing the first rubber hockey puck in Ottawa. He died in 1933 in Ottawa and was interred at Beechwood Cemetery.

== See also ==
- Ottawa Hockey Club
- Rideau Skating Rink
