= Bouse Hutton =

Canadian ice hockey and lacrosse player (1877–1962)

- Hockey Hall of Fame, 1963
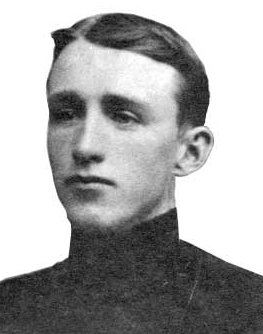
- Bouse Hutton, pictured early in his career
- Born: October 24, 1877 Ottawa, Ontario, Canada
- Died: October 27, 1962 (aged 85)
- Position: Goaltender
- Played for: Ottawa Hockey Club
- Playing career: 1898–1909

John Bower "Bouse" Hutton (October 24, 1877 – October 27, 1962) was a Canadian ice hockey goaltender who played for the Ottawa Hockey Club. Hutton also played lacrosse as a goaltender for the Ottawa Capitals, and Canadian football as a fullback for the Ottawa Rough Riders. Playing at the highest level of competition in each sport, Hutton won championships with all three teams.

After his career as a player, Hutton was an ice hockey coach in Ottawa for several years. He was inducted into the Hockey Hall of Fame in 1963.

== Career ==
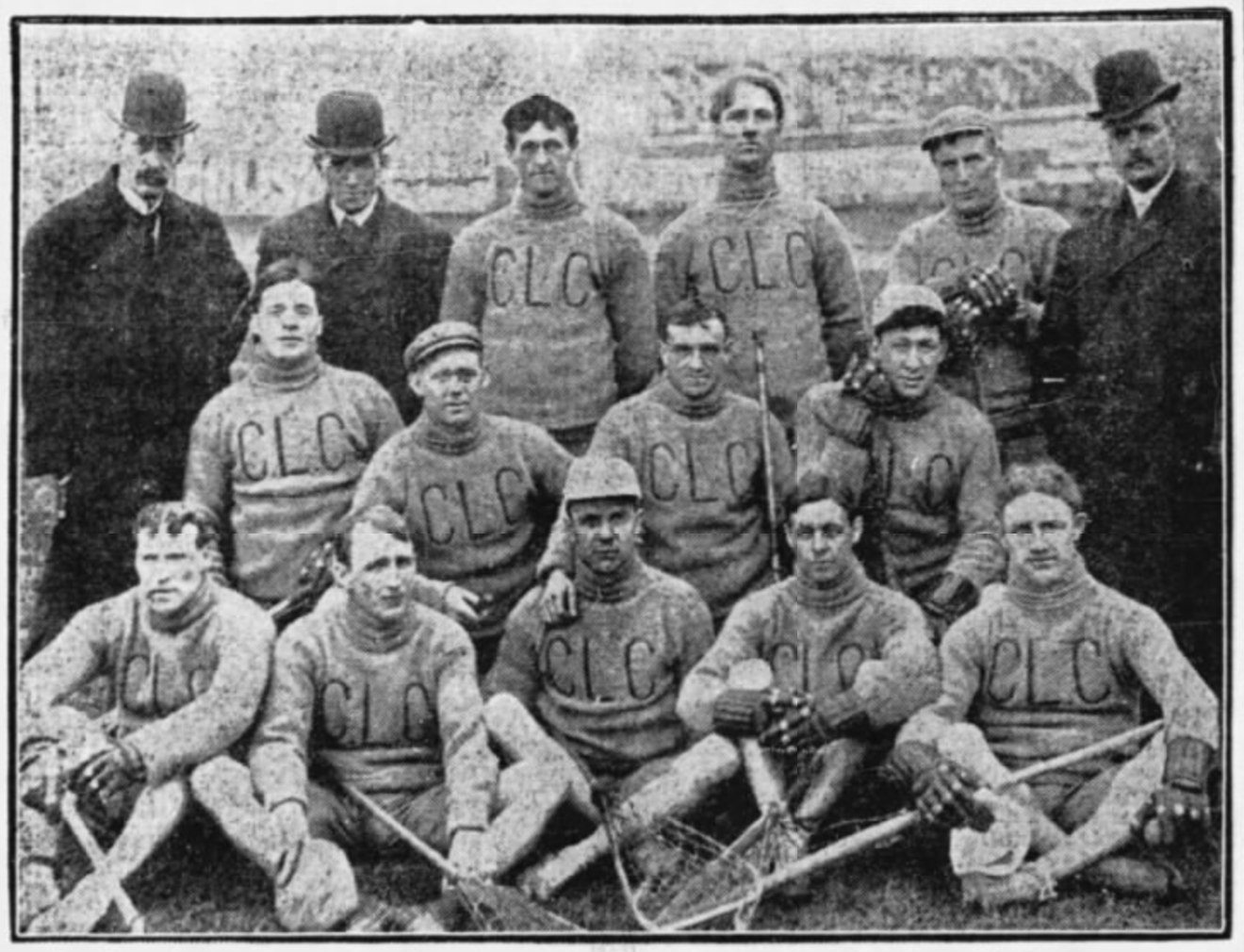
Hutton, second from left in the front row, with the Ottawa Capitals lacrosse team in 1907.

Hutton began his ice hockey career with the Ottawa Hockey Club of the Canadian Amateur Hockey League (CAHL) in the 1899 season with two appearances. The 1900 season was Hutton's first full season with Ottawa. Hutton finished the season with a 2.70 goals-against average, in a time when double-digit scores were very common. In the 1901 season, Hutton played all eight games, and continued to have a low goals-against average, of 2.50. In the 1902 season, Hutton recorded two shutouts, and finished with a 1.70 goals-against average.

In the 1903 season, his average increased to 3.80; however, in the CAHL playoffs, Hutton posted a 1–0–1 record, with one shutout and a 0.50 goals-average, while in the Stanley Cup finals, Hutton posted a 2–0 record, with a 2.00 goals-against average as Ottawa won the Stanley Cup. After the Stanley Cup win, the Ottawa Hockey Club became known as the Silver Seven, after the silver nuggets given to the players after their Stanley Cup victory by a team official who was a silver mine owner.

In the 1904 season, Hutton won all of Ottawa's four games, but the team withdrew from the CAHL mid-season before completing its eight-game schedule. Hutton appeared in Stanley Cup challenges only, posting a 6–1–1 record, with one shutout and a 2.90 goals-against average. At the end of the CAHL season, the Stanley Cup trustees ruled that Ottawa would retain the Cup.

Hutton played lacrosse during the summer months. Hutton won the first Minto Cup, then awarded to Canada's top senior men's lacrosse team, in 1901 with the Ottawa Capitals. In 1904, the club he played for was ruled to be a professional team and Hutton lost his amateur status to play ice hockey. In addition, he had a severe case of quinsy and he retired from ice hockey. After his retirement, Hutton won another Minto Cup with the Capitals in 1906. The team toured England after the win, and won 23 out of 24 games.

In 1909, Hutton returned for one more season of ice hockey with the professional Ottawa Senators of the Federal Amateur Hockey League (FAHL). He appeared in five games.

Hutton also played rugby football. In the fall of 1902, Hutton won the Canadian football championship with Ottawa Rough Riders.

== Career statistics ==
=== Regular season ===
Season	Team	League	GP	W	L	T	MIN	GA	SO	GAA
1899	Ottawa Hockey Club	CAHL	2	1	1	0	120	11	0	5.50
1900	Ottawa Hockey Club	CAHL	7	4	3	0	420	19	0	2.71
1901	Ottawa Hockey Club	CAHL	8	7	0	1	480	20	0	2.50
1902	Ottawa Hockey Club	CAHL	8	5	3	0	480	15	2	1.88
1903	Ottawa Hockey Club	CAHL	8	6	2	0	480	26	0	3.25
1904	Ottawa Hockey Club	CAHL	4	4	0	0	240	15	0	3.75
1909	Ottawa Senators	FAHL	5	3	2	0	300	26	1	5.20
CAHL totals			37	26	8	1	2220	106	2	2.86

=== Playoffs ===
Season	Team	League	GP	W	L	T	MIN	GA	SO	GAA
1903	Ottawa Hockey Club	CAHL	2	1	0	1	120	1	1	0.50
1903	Ottawa Hockey Club	St-Cup	2	2	0	0	120	4	1	2.00
1904	Ottawa Hockey Club	St-Cup	8	6	1	1	480	23	1	2.87
St-Cup totals			10	8	1	1	600	27	1	2.70

== See also ==
- Percy LeSueur
