= Albert Morel =

Canadian ice hockey player

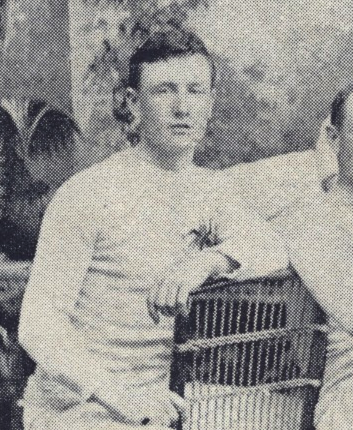
- Albert Morel in the 1892 Ottawa Hockey Club photo
- Born: March 5, 1870 Ottawa, Ontario, Canada
- Died: September 7, 1949 (aged 79) Ottawa, Ontario, Canada
- Position: Goaltender
- Played for: Ottawa Hockey Club
- Playing career: 1890–1894

Albert Elzear Morel (March 5, 1870 – September 7, 1949) was a Canadian ice hockey player for the Ottawa Hockey Club from 1890 to 1894. He was a member of the Ontario championship squads of 1890 to 1893. He played goaltender for the club.

== Playing career ==
Morel is first recorded as the goaltender for Ottawa College in 1890, as a 17-year-old. He joined the Ottawas after first playing against the Ottawas for the College. He joined the Ottawas and played for them for the duration of his education at the college until 1894.

== Personal life ==
While studying and playing hockey, Morel also worked for the Geological Survey as part of survey teams. After 1894, Morel was employed as a private secretary and later as a book-keeper for a lumber company.
