= Bert Russel =

Canadian ice hockey player

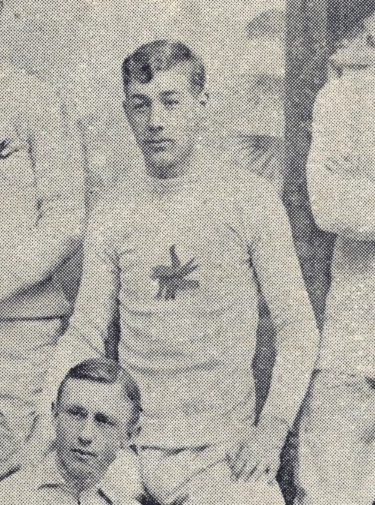
- Russel in the 1892 Ottawa Hockey Club photo
- Born: December 27, 1872 Montreal, Quebec, Canada
- Died: November 11, 1924 (aged 51) Vancouver, British Columbia, Canada
- Position: forward/defence
- Played for: Ottawa Hockey Club
- Playing career: 1891–1896

Hugh Yelverton "Bert" Russel (December 27, 1872 – November 11, 1924), occasionally misnamed Herbert Russell, was a Canadian ice hockey player who played for the Ottawa Hockey Club in the 1890s. He was captain of the team that won three successive Ontario championships and held the Canadian championship in 1892.

== Playing career ==
Russel played ice hockey and football at McGill University, where he studied mining engineering. Later, while living in Ottawa, he continued playing both sports as a member of the Ottawa Hockey Club and the Ottawa Football Club. Russel played for the Ottawa Hockey Club from 1890 until 1896 and was captain from 1891 through 1893. His best offensive seasons for that club were in 1893–94 and 1894–95 when in both seasons he scored 10 goals in eight games. Russel left Ottawa in 1896 for an engineering position in Colorado.

== Career outside sport ==
A draftsman for the Geological Survey of Canada during his time in Ottawa, he served as field assistant to geologists Albert Peter Low and later R.G. McConnell. McConnell named the Russel Range in British Columbia after his assistant. In Colorado, Russel worked for a series of mining companies and practiced as a consulting mining engineer before returning to Canada in 1911. He died in 1924 in Vancouver, where he was a sales manager for the Canadian Explosives Company, Ltd.

He was the father of Canadian football player Jeff Russel and brother of Hockey Hall of Famer Blair Russel.

Preceded by P. D. Ross	Ottawa Senators captain (Original Era); 1891–1893	Succeeded by Weldy Young
