= Chauncey Kirby =

Canadian ice hockey player

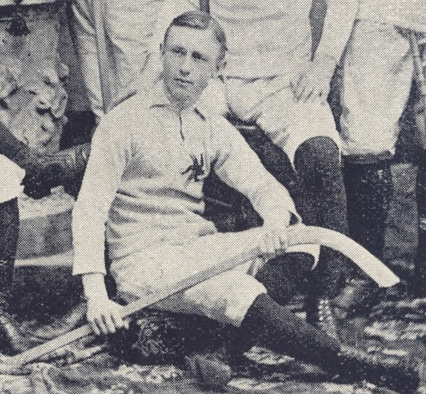
- Chauncey Kirby in the 1892 Ottawa Hockey Club photo
- Born: October 15, 1871 Ottawa, Ontario, Canada
- Died: October 23, 1950 (aged 79) Ottawa, Ontario, Canada
- Position: Forward
- Played for: Ottawa Hockey Club
- Playing career: 1892–1899

Chauncey Thomas Kirby (October 15, 1871 – October 23, 1950) was a Canadian ice hockey player in the 1890s for the Ottawa Hockey Club of the Ontario Hockey Association and Amateur Hockey Association of Canada (AHAC). He was a member of the three-time Ottawa champions from 1891 to 1893. He played in the original Stanley Cup playoff Final in 1894, and scored the contest's first goal. His brother Halder also played for the club. He was part of two Stanley Cups with the Ottawa club in 1903 and 1904 as a director.

== Personal life ==
Kirby was born in Ottawa in 1871, the second-youngest of seven children born to Thomas Halder and Mary Kirby (née Graham), British/Irish immigrants to Canada. There were four boys, Chauncey, Halder, Richmond and Lincoln (died in infancy) and three girls, Elizabeth, Emma and Laura. Thomas is listed in the 1872 census as a bank manager, and in the 1881 census as a city foreman.

== Career ==
Chauncey Kirby joined the Ottawa HC in 1890 and played six seasons for the club, and was elected captain for the 1895–96 season. He played again for the club in 1898-99 before retiring. He became a referee after retiring. He would be the referee of record for the 1908 Stanley Cup challenge between the Winnipeg Maple Leafs and the Montreal Wanderers.

== See also ==
- 1903 CAHL season
- 1904 CAHL season

Preceded by Weldy Young	Ottawa Senators captain (Original Era); 1895–1896	Succeeded by Fred Chittick
Preceded by Harvey Pulford	Ottawa Senators captain (Original Era); 1898–99	Succeeded by Hod Stuart
