= Frank Jenkins (ice hockey) =

Canadian ice hockey player

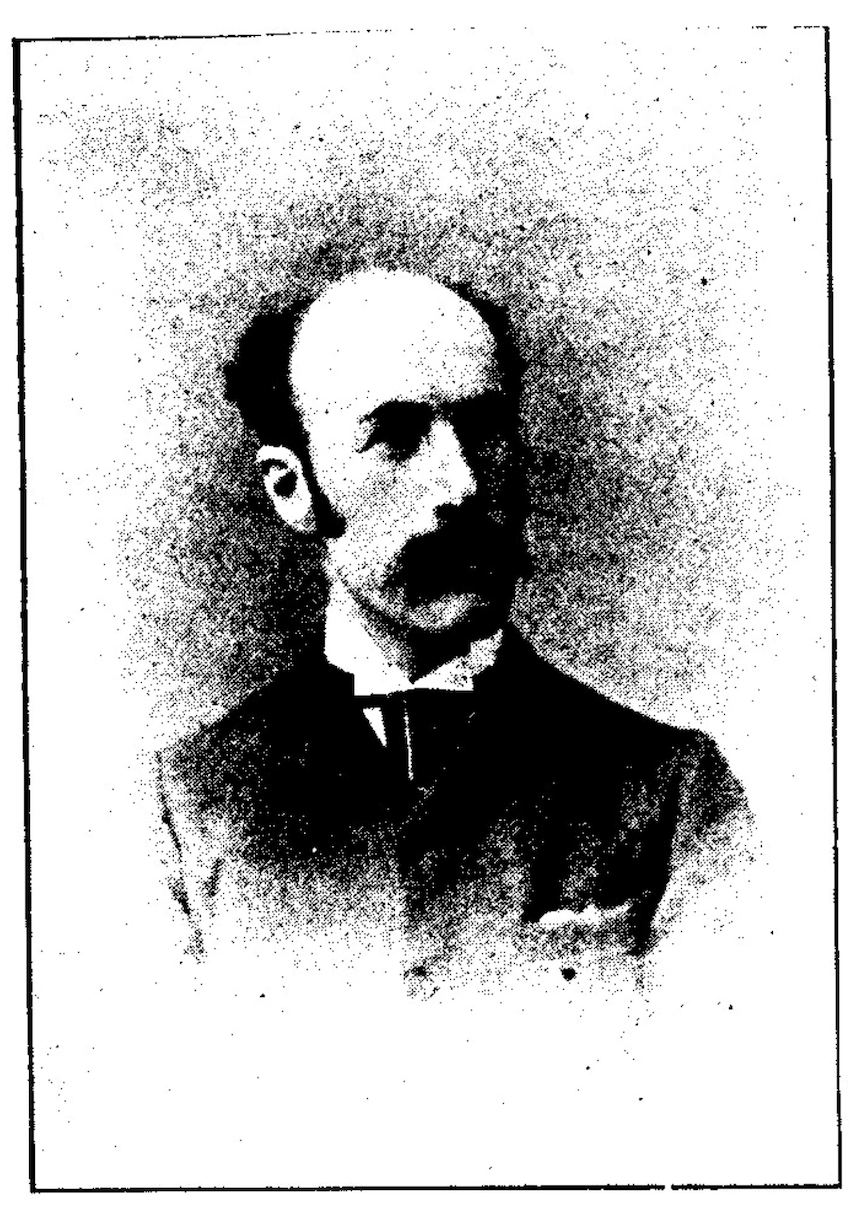
- Photo from The Dominion Illustrated Monthly (Vol. 2 no. 1, February 1893)
- Born: Frank Maurice Stinson Jenkins; July 6, 1859; Kingston, United Province of Canada
- Died: December 5, 1930 (aged 71); Ottawa, Ontario
- Known for: ice hockey player, ice hockey executive

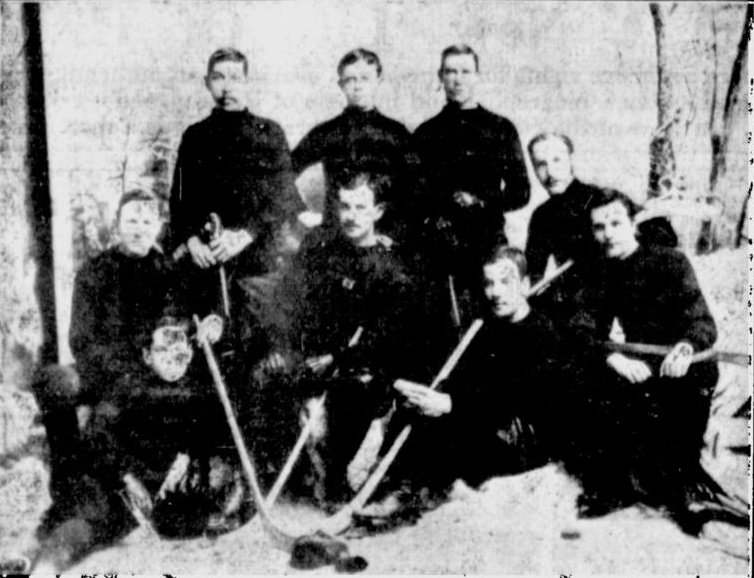
Jenkins, at right in the middle row, with the 1883–84 Ottawa Hockey Club.

Frank Maurice Stinson Jenkins (July 6, 1859 – December 5, 1930) was an early amateur ice hockey player. He was a founder, and the first captain of the Ottawa Hockey Club (Ottawa HC) of 1883. He was also the founder in 1894 of Ottawa's first full-size orchestra, the Ottawa Amateur Orchestral Society.

== Family ==
Born in Kingston, United Province of Canada, Jenkins moved to Ottawa as a boy and resided in Ottawa ever since. He was a son of Charles W. Jenkins and Carolyn Counter Jenkins. He was the grandson of Kingston mayor John Counter. In 1892, Frank married Annie Lampman, a concert pianist and sister of Archibald Lampman. Frank and Anne had one son, Frank T. and three daughters, Dorothy, Ruth and Marjorie. Their daughter Dorothy Jenkins McCurry was a noted vocal soloist and teacher in Ottawa.

== Ice hockey ==
In 1883, after viewing the ice hockey tournament at the Montreal Winter Carnival, Halder Kirby and Jack Kerr returned to Ottawa, with a plan to form a hockey club. The Ottawa Hockey Club was formed, and Frank Jenkins was its first captain.

The club played in the Montreal tournaments in 1884 and 1885. In 1886, the Amateur Hockey Association of Canada (AHAC) league was formed with Ottawa one of the founding members. The Ottawa HC would play in the inaugural season of 1887, a season of challenges between teams, allowing the winner to be the current champion, with the final winner of the season considered Canadian champion. The club would not play in the AHAC again until 1891, and was dormant in 1888, restarting in 1889 after the opening of the Rideau Skating Rink. Jenkins would again be the captain.

The club would help found the Ontario Hockey Association in 1890, and was its first champion in the years 1890 to 1893. In 1891, Jenkins would assume the president title for the Ottawa HC, and in 1892, would assume the president title of the AHAC.

== Career ==
Jenkins is listed as a clerk for the Post Office, Main Ottawa Branch in the 1889–90 Ottawa Directory. He retired from the Post Office in 1928.

== Music ==
Jenkins was also a talented musician. In December 1885, he played in an organ recital at Christ Church of Ottawa where he opened the program with a "meritorious and well-received playing" of Mendelssohn's First Sonata. He was an organist at several churches in Ottawa: Knox Church in 1886 and 1887, Dominion Methodist from 1887 until 1895, St. Andrew's from 1895 to 1909, St. John's Anglican from 1910.

Jenkins, along with his wife Anne, founded Ottawa's first full-size orchestra, the Ottawa Amateur Orchestral Society in 1894. The Society's first performance was in December 1894. Jenkins would conduct the orchestra until 1900.

He also was an organizer of the Ottawa Schubert Club Choral Society, which became the Ottawa Choral Society, from 1897 to 1914. The Society, a group of 175 amateurs, gave its first performance, with Jenkins conducting of Messiah on December 29, 1896, in the Grand Opera House.

== Later years ==
In later years, Jenkins was a member of the Ottawa Canoe Club, Ottawa Lawn Bowling Club and the Rideau Curling Club and he also played golf and tennis. He died at his home at 216 Cooper Street in Ottawa after a short illness on December 5, 1930, and was interred on December 8, 1930, at Beechwood Cemetery.

== See also ==
- Ottawa Hockey Club
- Amateur Hockey Association of Canada

== References and notes ==
- Kitchen, Paul (April 13, 1998). "It's true: Hockey players can be artistic". Ottawa Citizen. pp. C3.

Preceded by New creation	Ottawa Senators captain (Original Era); 1883–86	Succeeded by Thomas D. Green
Preceded by Thomas D. Green	Ottawa Senators captain (Original Era); 1889–90	Succeeded by P. D. Ross
