= Weldy Young =

Canadian businessman and athlete

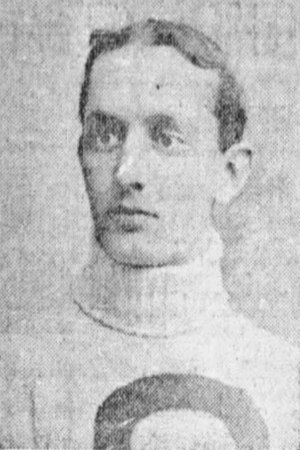
- Young in 1900–01 with the Ottawa Football Club
- Born: October 4, 1871 Ottawa, Ontario, Canada
- Died: October 27, 1944 (aged 73) Collingwood, Ontario, Canada
- Position: Defence (coverpoint)
- Played for: Ottawa Hockey Club; Dawson City Nuggets
- Playing career: 1890–1905

Weldon "Weldy" Champness Young (October 4, 1871 – October 27, 1944) was a Canadian businessman and athlete. Young was an ice hockey player for the Ottawa Hockey Club, playing in its founding years in the 1880s and in the 1890s. Young later became a member of the Dawson City Nuggets which played against Ottawa in the 1905 Stanley Cup challenge. His older brother George Young (1865–1926) was one of the original Ottawa players and the two played together for Ottawa from 1889 to 1891. Young later became an investor and executive in mining in the Cobalt, Ontario area.

== Playing career ==
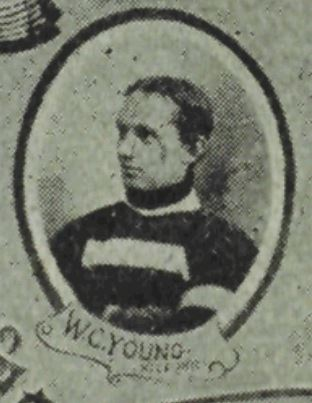
Young in 1896–97

Young, a defenceman, first played for Ottawa Hockey Club in 1889, as a 19-year-old, playing with his brother George. The team won the Ontario championship from 1891 through 1893. The team also held the AHAC title for most of the 1891–92 season. Young was present at the dinner where Lord Stanley announced the Stanley Cup. Young would play in the Stanley Cup title game in 1894 versus the Montreal Hockey Club.

"Chalk" as he was nicknamed, played for both the Ottawa Hockey Club and Ottawa Football Club. He lived at the fire station in Ottawa where his father was the chief superintendent. Young was active on the organizational side, being on the executive committee, served as team captain and was a vice-president of the AHAC from 1893 to 1897. He played on defence, the position of coverpoint, teamed with Harvey Pulford "The Slugger" on point. The two complemented each other, Chalk often leading the rush, while Pulford would be the steady player backing up the team. His final season with Ottawa was 1899.

In the early 1900s, Young moved out west, finding work in Dawson City, Yukon Territory during the Klondike Gold Rush. He was recruited by the Dawson City Nuggets which challenged Ottawa for the Stanley Cup in the 1904–05 season, although he was unable to participate in the series due to his duties as a federal civil servant during a federal election at the time. He also found work as a referee in the Timiskaming League after retiring as a player.

When the National Hockey Association (NHA) was holding merger talks with the Canadian Hockey Association (CHA), Young was the representative of the Haileybury club, although the club was owned by Ambrose O'Brien.

== Mining career ==
After leaving Ottawa, Young joined the mining business in Dawson City, Yukon Territory. By 1911, he was back east in Haileybury, Ontario during the "silver rush" in the area and he became an investor in several mines. Young later became the president of Young-Davidson mines, Weldon Coal Mines and vice-president of Matachewan-Hub Pioneer Mines Limited.

Young died at his home in Collingwood, Ontario on October 27, 1944. He was survived by his wife Jessie Williams. Young was buried in the Trinity United Church cemetery in Collingwood.

== Career statistics ==
			Regular season					Playoffs
Season	Team	League	GP	G	A	Pts	PIM	GP	G	A	Pts	PIM
1890-91	Ottawa HC	AHAC	1	0	0	0	0	—	—	—	—	—
1890-91	Ottawa HC	OCHL	4	0	0	0	0	-	-	-	-	-
1890-91	Ottawa HC	OHA Sr.	-	-	-	-	-	2	1	0	1	0
1891-92	Ottawa HC	Rideau	1	0	0	0	0	-	-	-	-	-
1891-92	Ottawa HC	AHAC	7	1	0	1	0	-	-	-	-	-
1891-92	Ottawa HC	OHA Sr.	-	-	-	-	-	2	1	0	1	0
1892-93	Ottawa HC	AHAC	8	3	2	5	0	-	-	-	-	-
1892-93	Ottawa HC	OHA Sr.	-	-	-	-	-	1	0	0	0	0
1892-93	Ottawa HC	Exhibition	1	0	0	0	0	-	-	-	-	-
1893-94	Ottawa HC	AHAC	8	1	5	6	3	1	0	0	0	0
1893-94	Ottawa HC	OHA Sr.	-	-	-	-	-	1	0	0	0	0
1894-95	Ottawa HC	AHAC	8	3	3	6	5	-	-	-	-	-
1894-95	Ottawa HC	Exhibition	1	0	0	0	0	-	-	-	-	-
1895-96	Ottawa HC	AHAC	8	0	2	2	0	-	-	-	-	-
1896-97	Ottawa HC	AHAC	8	0	1	1	0	-	-	-	-	-
1897-98	Ottawa HC	AHAC	8	2	4	6	10	-	-	-	-	-
1897-98	Ottawa HC	Exhibition	1	0	0	0	0	-	-	-	-	-
1898-99	Ottawa HC	CAHL	7	1	3	4	14	-	-	-	-	-
1898-99	Ottawa Aberdeens	CAHL Int.	statistics not available
1898-99	Ottawa Rough Riders	OHA Int.	2	0	1	1	0	-	-	-	-	-

Source: Society for International Hockey Research

Preceded by Bert Russel	Ottawa Senators captain (original era); 1893–1895	Succeeded by Chauncey Kirby
