= Halder Kirby =

Canadian ice hockey player

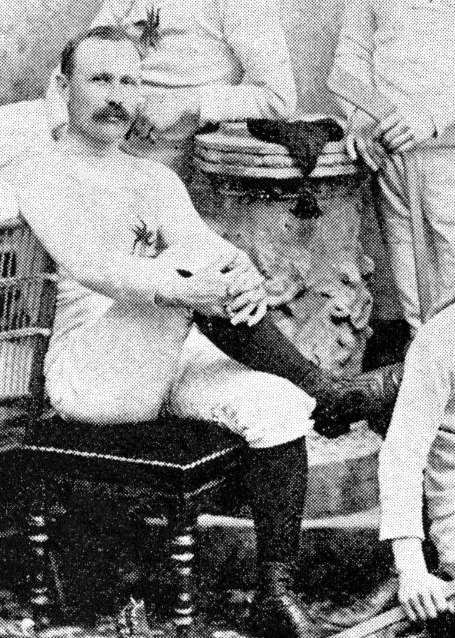
- Halder Kirby in the 1892 Ottawa Hockey Club photo
- Born: October 3, 1863 Ottawa, Canada West
- Died: July 12, 1924 (aged 60) Winnipeg, Manitoba, Canada
- Position: Forward
- Played for: Ottawa Hockey Club
- Playing career: 1883–1894

Halder Smith Kirby (October 3, 1863 – July 12, 1924) was a Canadian ice hockey player, doctor and druggist. He was a co-founder of the Ottawa Hockey Club, later to become the Ottawa Senators. He played with the team from 1883 until 1894. His brother Chauncey Kirby also played for Ottawa.

== Personal life ==
Kirby was born in Ottawa in 1863, the third of six children born to Thomas H. and Mary Kirby. There were three boys, Chauncey, Halder and Richmond and three girls, Elizabeth, Emma and Laura. Thomas is listed in the 1872 census as a bank manager, and in the 1881 census as a city foreman. Halder Kirby is listed in the Ottawa Directory of 1889–90 as a 'druggist' with 'Kirby Brothers' along with Richard Kirby.

== Playing career ==
Halder Kirby helped found the Ottawa HC in 1883. He played for Ottawa in the inaugural Amateur Hockey Association of Canada (AHAC) season of 1886–87. When the club returned to the AHAC in 1890–91 he played one game for the team before playing two full seasons from 1891 until 1893. He played one final game in 1894. He later was the team doctor during the Stanley Cup victories of 1903, 1904, 1905, 1906.

== See also ==
- List of Ottawa Senators (Original) players
