= Gilmour (surname) =

Gilmour is a surname of Scottish or Irish origin, derived from an anglicisation of the Gaelic name Mac Gille Mhoire (meaning "Son of the Follower of the Virgin Mary"), the same origin as the name McLemore. Notable people with this surname include:

- Alan Gilmour (disambiguation)
- Andrew Gilmour (cricketer)
- Bill Gilmour (disambiguation), various, including:
  - Bill Gilmour (director) (born 1939), Scottish television director
  - Bill Gilmour (politician) (born 1942), Canadian politician
- Billy Gilmour (ice hockey) (1885–1959), Canadian ice hockey player
- Billy Gilmour (born 2001), Scottish footballer
- Clyde Gilmour (1912–1997), Canadian broadcaster and print journalist
- David Gilmour (disambiguation), various, including:
  - Dave Gilmour (ice hockey, born 1881) (1881–1932), Canadian hockey player (Ottawa Silver Seven)
  - Dave Gilmour (ice hockey, born 1950), major league ice hockey player (Calgary Cowboys)
  - David Gilmour (writer), Canadian writer and television journalist
  - David Gilmour, English guitarist and member of Pink Floyd
  - Sir David Gilmour, 4th Baronet
- Doug Gilmour (born 1963), Canadian ice hockey player
- Ginger Gilmour, American artist, model and sculptor
- Graham Gilmour, (1885–1912) was a British pioneer aviator.
- Ian Gilmour, Baron Gilmour of Craigmillar (1926–2007), British politician
- James Gilmour (disambiguation), various
- John Gilmour (disambiguation), various, including:
  - Sir John Gilmour of Craigmillar (1605–1671), Lord President of the Court of Session 1661–1671
  - Sir John Gilmour, 1st Baronet (1845–1920), Scottish Unionist politician
  - Sir John Gilmour, 2nd Baronet (1876–1940), Scottish Unionist politician, Home Secretary, Secretary of State for Scotland
  - Sir John Gilmour, 3rd Baronet (1912–2007), Scottish Conservative Party politician, Member of Parliament for East Fife 1961–1979
  - John Gilmour (ice hockey), (born 1993), Canadian ice hockey player
- Kirsty Gilmour (born 1993), Scottish badminton player
- Lee Gilmour (born 1978), English former professional rugby league footballer
- Leon Gilmour (1907–1996), American printmaker
- Léonie Gilmour (1873–1933), American educator, editor, and journalist
- Mhairi Gilmour (born 1980), Scottish footballer
- Peggy Gilmour, American politician
- Raymond Gilmour (1959–2016), Northern Irish republican paramilitary who later became a double agent, reporting to British security
- Robert Gilmour Leckie (1833–1914), Canadian mining engineer

== See also ==
- Gillmor
- Gilmor
- Gilmore (surname)
- Gilmour (disambiguation)
