= Gilmore =

Gilmore or Gillmore may refer to:

- Gilmore (surname)

== Places ==
=== Australia ===
- Gilmore, Australian Capital Territory, a suburb in the Canberra district of Tuggeranong
- Gilmore Avenue, a road in southern Perth, Western Australia
- Division of Gilmore, an Australian Electoral Division in New South Wales

=== Canada ===
- Gilmore station (SkyTrain), a SkyTrain station in Burnaby, British Columbia

=== Philippines ===
- Gilmore Avenue, Quezon City
- Gilmore station (Line 2), a railway station on the Manila Line 2 in Quezon City, Philippines

=== United States ===
- Gilmore, Arkansas
- Gilmore, Idaho
- Gilmore, Effingham County, Illinois
- Gilmore, Maryland
- Gilmore, Missouri
- Gilmore, Nebraska
- Gilmore, Ohio
- Gilmore, Oklahoma
- Gilmore City, Iowa
- Gilmore Township, Benzie County, Michigan
- Gilmore Township, Isabella County, Michigan
- Gilmore Township, Greene County, Pennsylvania
- Gilmore Creek, a river in Kansas
- Gilmore Field, a minor league baseball park in Los Angeles, California
- Gilmore Lake, a backcountry lake in the Sierra Nevada of California
- Gilmore Stadium, a former stadium in Los Angeles, California

== Schools and museums ==
- Gilmore Car Museum, a museum located in Hickory Corners, Michigan, United States
- Gilmore Community School, an elementary school in Burnaby, British Columbia, Canada
- Gilmore Elementary School, an elementary school in Richmond, British Columbia, Canada

== Other ==
- Gilmore Commission, U.S. Congressional Advisory Panel to Assess Domestic Response Capabilities for Terrorism Involving Weapons of Mass Destruction
- Gilmore (1824 ship), transported settlers and convicts from England to Australia
- USS Gilmore (DE-18), an Evarts-class short-hull destroyer escort
- Gillmore Medal, a military decoration of the United States Army
- Gilmore Girls, an American television series that ran from 2000 to 2007
- Gilmore the lion, a flying lion
- 2537 Gilmore, an asteroid

== See also ==
- Gillmor
- Gilmor
- Gilmour (disambiguation)
