= Andrew Gilmour =

Andrew Gilmour may refer to:

- Andrew Gilmour (politician) (1875–1938), Canadian politician
- Andrew Gilmour (UN official) (born 1964), British diplomat
- Andrew Gilmour (cricketer) (born 1970), Zimbabwean first-class cricketer
