= McLemore =

McLemore is a Scottish surname, possibly derived from an anglicisation of the Gaelic name Mac Gille Mhoire (meaning "Son of the Follower of the Virgin Mary"), the same origin as the name Gilmour. Notable people with this surname include:

- A. Jeff McLemore (1857–1929), American newspaper publisher, State Representative and United States Representative from Texas
- Albert S. McLemore (1869–1921), American officer serving in the United States Marine Corps during the Spanish–American War
- Amos McLemore (1823–1863) Jones County, Mississippi anti-secessionist who became commander of a Confederate company, the Rosin Heels
- Anna-Marie McLemore, Mexican-American author of young adult fiction
- Ben McLemore (born 1993), American basketball player
- Chris McLemore (born 1963), former American football running back
- Clinton W. McLemore, American psychologist and author
- Dana McLemore (born 1960), former professional American football cornerback in the National Football League
- David McLemore (born 1987), American tubist and Instructor of tuba and euphonium
- Doris McLemore (1927–2016), the last fluent speaker of the Wichita language of the Great Plains of North America
- Dorothy McElmore Priesing (1910-1999), American composer
- Elle McLemore (born 1991), American actress
- Emmett McLemore, professional football player who played in the National Football League
- Henry McLemore, sports columnist for the Hearst Newspapers organization
- James McLemore, Alabama preacher and co-founder of the Alabama Baptist Association
- John B. McLemore (died 2015), American antiquary horologist and polymath and central figure of the podcast S-Town
- Lamonte McLemore (1935–2026) American vocalist and founding member of The 5th Dimension
- Leslie B. McLemore (born 1940), civil rights activist and political leader in Jackson, Mississippi
- Malik McLemore (born 1997), German professional footballer
- Mark McLemore (born 1964), former second baseman and utility player in Major League Baseball
- Mark McLemore (pitcher) (born 1980), Major League Baseball pitcher
- McCoy McLemore (1942–2009), American former college and professional basketball star of the 1960s and 1970s
- Monica McLemore (born 1969), American nurse and academic
- Shawn McLemore (1967–2021), American gospel musician and leader of New Image
- Thomas Henry McLemore, American politician
- Thomas McLemore (born 1970), American football player
- William Sugars McLemore (1830–1908), circuit judge for Tennessee, colonel in the Confederate States Army during the American Civil War

== See also ==
- Macklemore, American rapper and musician
