= William Gilmour =

William Gilmour may refer to:

- William Gilmour (musician) (fl. 2010s), British musician and artist
- William Gilmour (writer) (fl. 1980s), writer of lost race fantasy short stories and novels
- William Weir Gilmour (1905–1998), Scottish politician

== See also ==
- William Gilmer (1863–1955), U.S. Navy Captain and Naval Governor of Guam
- Bill Gilmour (disambiguation)
- Billy Gilmour (disambiguation)
