= Alexander Gilmour =

Alexander Gilmour may refer to:

- Sir Alexander Gilmour, 1st Baronet (1657–1731), Scottish MP
- Sir Alexander Gilmour, 3rd Baronet (c. 1737–1792), Scottish MP

== See also ==
- Gilmour (surname)
