= Ottawa Aberdeens =

- City: Ottawa, Ontario; Canada
- League: OSCHL (1915–1919)
- Colours: Orange, Black
- Captain: Charles T. Moffat (1892–93)

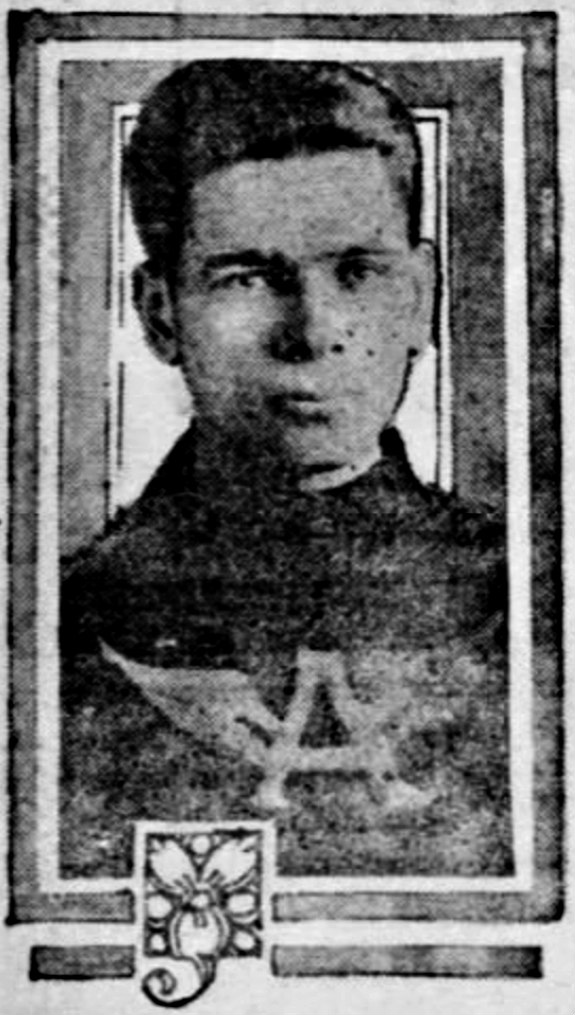
Morley Bruce with the Aberdeens.

The Ottawa Aberdeens (or Aberdeen Hockey Club) were an amateur ice hockey team from Ottawa that played in various junior, intermediate and senior amateur leagues from the 1890s to the 1910s. Between 1915–1919 the club figured in the Ottawa City Senior League.

For the 1892–93 season the Aberdeens played in the Ottawa Junior City Hockey League against the Rebels, Rideaus, Ottawa Jr., Electrics, and Ottawa College teams, and were captained by Charles T. Moffat.

Several prominent early era hockey players in Ottawa came up through the Aberdeen ranks, such as Harry Westwick, "One-Eyed" Frank McGee and the three Gilmour brothers Dave, Suddy and Billy.

== Notable players ==
- Harry Westwick
- Frank McGee
- Dave Gilmour
- Suddy Gilmour
- Billy Gilmour
- Dave Finnie
- Harry Smith
- Aurèle Joliat
