= David Gilmour (disambiguation) =

David Gilmour (born 1946) is an English guitarist and member of Pink Floyd.

Dave Gilmour or David Gilmour may also refer to:

- Dave Gilmour (ice hockey, born 1881) (1881–1932), Canadian hockey player for the Ottawa Silver Seven
- Dave Gilmour (ice hockey, born 1950), major league ice hockey player for the Calgary Cowboys
- David Gilmour (businessman) (1931–2023), founder of Fiji Water
- David Gilmour (trade unionist) (died 1926), British trade unionist and politician
- David Gilmour (writer) (born 1949), Canadian writer and television journalist
- David Gilmour (historian) (born 1952), Scottish author
- David R. Gilmour (born 1958), American diplomat
- David Gilmour (album), the first solo album by David Gilmour (1978)
- David Gilmour (badminton) (born 1971), Scottish badminton player

== See also ==
- David Gilmore (born 1964), jazz guitarist
- David Gilmour Blythe (1815–1865), American artist
- David Gillmore, Baron Gillmore of Thamesfield (1934–1999), British diplomat
