= Suddy Gilmour =

Canadian ice hockey player

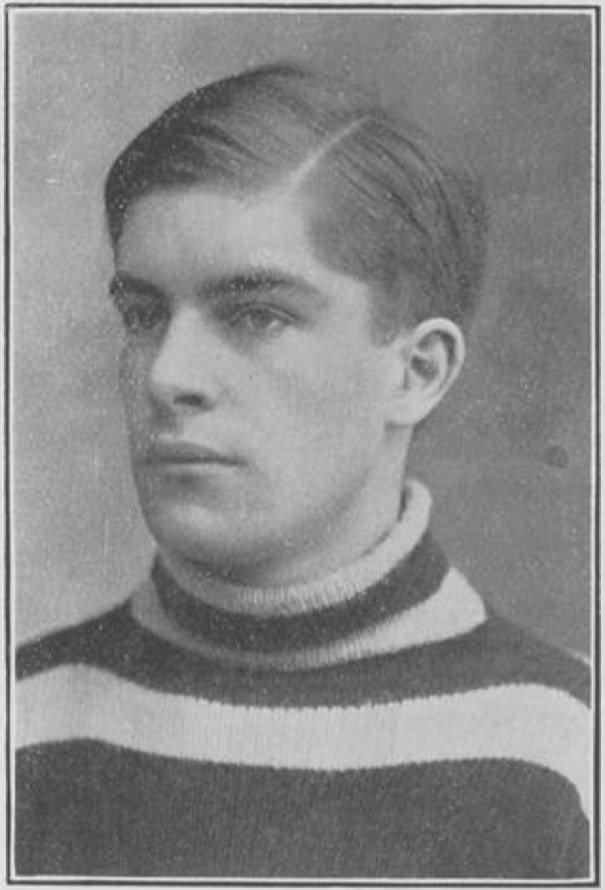
- Gilmour with Ottawa HC (1902–03)
- Born: August 7, 1883 Ottawa, Ontario, Canada
- Died: February 14, 1932 (aged 48)
- Position: Left wing
- Played for: Ottawa Aberdeens; Ottawa Hockey Club
- Playing career: 1901–1904

Sutherland Campbell "Suddy" Gilmour (August 7, 1883 – February 14, 1932) was a Canadian amateur athlete. He was a championship ice hockey player for the Ottawa Silver Seven of the 1900s. His brothers Billy Gilmour and Dave Gilmour also played for Ottawa at the same time. He won the Stanley Cup in 1903, 1904 with Ottawa.

== Sports career ==
Gilmour played several sports, including rugby football with the Ottawa Rough Riders, ice hockey and lacrosse. He also boxed. He participated in all sports as an amateur. He joined the Silver Seven in 1903, and played only two years of ice hockey, both championship years for Ottawa. Suddy scored the series-winning goal in the 1903 play-off against Montreal to win the Stanley Cup for Ottawa. According to Llewelyn Bate, one-time manager of the Ottawa Club, Suddie played "clean", unlike the rest of the team, which was known for its rough play.

== Personal ==
Gilmour was the second son of five children. The other children were Dave, Bill, Ward and his sister Gilbert. Gilmour married Marjorie Louise Blair and they had one son Blair and one daughter Audrey. He had several business interests, primarily construction contracting. He had retired from contracting several years before his death, which occurred after a six-month-long illness.

Gilmour is buried at Beechwood Cemetery.
