= Gilmor =

Gilmor may refer to:

- Harry Gilmor (1838–1883), Baltimore City Police Commissioner
- Jane Gilmor (born 1947), American intermedia artist and educator
- Robert Gilmor Jr. (1774–1848), American merchant, shipowner, East-India importer, and art collector. Spouse of Sarah
- Sarah Gilmor, née Sarah Reeve Ladson (1790–1866), American socialite, arts patron, and style icon. Spouse of Robert
- Gilmor's Raid, a raid that was part of an overall campaign against Union railroads during the American Civil War. Named for Harry.

== See also ==
- Gillmor
- Gilmore (disambiguation)
- Gilmore (surname)
- Gilmour (disambiguation)
- Gilmour (surname)
