= Alan Gilmour =

Alan or Allan Gilmour may refer to:

- Alan Gilmour (playwright), Scottish-born playwright and librettist
- Allan Gilmour Sr. (1775–1849), Scottish-born businessman in the shipping and timber industries
- Allan Gilmour (businessman, born 1805) (1805–1884), Scottish-born businessman in the shipping and timber industries, nephew of the above
- Alan Gilmour (footballer) (1911–1962), Australian rules footballer
- Sir Allan Gilmour (British Army officer) (1916–2003), Scottish soldier and politician.
- Allan Gilmour (university administrator), American president of Wayne State University

== See also ==
- Alan C. Gilmore (born 1944), New Zealand astronomer
