= Gilmour =

Gilmour may refer to:

- Gilmour (surname), people with the surname Gilmour
- Gilmour, Indiana, a small town in the United States
- Gilmour (brand) owned by Fiskars (watering products, garden hoses, faucets and connectors)
- Gilmour Academy, a K-12 college preparatory school in Gates Mills, Ohio, USA
- Gilmour Space Technologies, Australian spacelaunch company

== See also ==
- Gillmor
- Gilmor
- Gilmore (disambiguation)
