= Gillmor =

Gillmor may refer to:

== People ==
- Arthur Hill Gillmor (1824–1903), Canadian farmer, lumberman and politician
- Dan Gillmor, American technology writer
- Daniel Gillmor (1849–1918), Canadian merchant and politician
- Helen W. Gillmor (born 1942), United States federal judge
- Paul Gillmor (1939–2007), American politician
- Robert Gillmor (born 1936), English ornithologist, artist, and author
- Samuel Gillmor Haughton (1889–1959), British politician

== Other ==
- Mount Gillmor, a mountain of Oates Land, the United States

== See also ==
- Gilmor
- Gilmore (disambiguation)
- Gilmore (surname)
- Gilmour (disambiguation)
- Gilmour (surname)
