= James Gilmore (disambiguation) =

Jim Gilmore (James Stuart Gilmore III, born 1949) is an American politician, diplomat and former attorney.

James Gilmore may also refer to:

- Jim Gilmore (baseball) (1853–1928), American baseball player
- James Gilmore (Wisconsin politician) (1786–1848), member of the Wisconsin State Assembly
- James A. Gilmore (1876–1947), American president of the Federal League
- James Gilmore Elementary School, school in Richmond, British Columbia, Canada

== See also ==
- James Gilmour (disambiguation)
