= Gilmore Creek =

Stream in Morris County, Kansas, U.S.

Coordinates: 38.717784°N 96.557782°W

Gilmore Creek is a stream in Morris County, Kansas, in the United States.

Gilmore Creek was named for a pioneer settler.

== See also ==
- List of rivers of Kansas
