= Alan Gilmour (footballer) =

Australian rules footballer

Personal information
- Full name: Alan Gilmour
- Born: 18 November 1911; South Melbourne, Victoria
- Died: 1 September 1962 (aged 50); Brighton East, Victoria
- Original team: Elsternwick (MAFA)
- Height: 178 cm (5 ft 10 in)
- Weight: 80 kg (176 lb)

Playing career^{1}
Years	Club	Games (Goals)
1932–1933	South Melbourne	10 (0)
- ^{1} Playing statistics correct to the end of 1933.

Alan Gilmour (18 November 1911 – 1 September 1962) was an Australian rules footballer who played for the South Melbourne Football Club in the Victorian Football League (VFL).

== Family ==
The son of William Harold Gilmour (1876–1957), and Annie Elizabeth Gilmour (1879–1958), née Jewell, Alan Gilmour was born in South Melbourne on 18 November 1911.

He married Joan Lytton Reed (1913–2007) on 17 July 1937.

== Football ==
=== Elsternwick (MAFA) ===
While playing with the Elsternwick Football Club in the Metropolitan Amateur Football Association (MAFA) he was selected in the Victorian (MAFA) 1931 representative side to play against the South Australian (SAAFL) side, at the M.C.G., on 8 June 1931, and in the MAFA 1932 representative side to play against the SAAFL side, at the Norwood Oval, on 6 June 1932.

=== South Melbourne (VFL) ===
On the training list at South Melbourne for the 1932 season, he played several games in the Second XVIII, and played his first senior game, on the half-back flank, against Melbourne, at the MCG, on 23 July 1932, as a last-minute replacement for the injured Hugh McLaughlin.

Gilmour, a printer/compositor by trade, retired from VFL football in 1934, having served his apprenticeship at The Emerald Hill Record, and having gained employment with The Argus newspaper.

== Death ==
He died at Brighton East, Victoria on 1 September 1962.
