= Bill Gilmour =

Bill Gilmour or Billy Gilmour may refer to:

- Bill Gilmour (director) (born 1939), Scottish television director
- Bill Gilmour (politician) (born 1942), Canadian politician
- Billy Gilmour (born 2001), Scottish footballer
- Billy Gilmour (ice hockey) (1885–1959), Canadian ice hockey player
- Bill Gilmour Sr. (born 1934), Australian tennis player
- Bill Gilmour Jr. (born 1960), Australian tennis player

== See also ==
- Billy Gilmore (died 1978), American musician
