= Clinton W. McLemore =

American psychologist and author

- Education: Admiral Farragut Academy; Adelphi University (BA); University of Southern California (PhD)
- Occupations: Psychologist; author

Clinton W. McLemore is an American psychologist and author.

== Education ==
For high school, McLemore attended Admiral Farragut Academy. He earned his Ph.D. in Clinical Psychology from the University of Southern California.

== Career ==
McLemore began his teaching career at Mount St. Mary's College, after which he joined the faculty of the Graduate School of Psychology at Fuller Theological Seminary, where he taught for ten years.

In 1983, he founded Clinician's Research Digest. It was later acquired and is now operated by the American Psychological Association, which also runs a continuing education program based on it. CRD has since been divided into two journals: Clinician’s Research Digest: Adult Populations, and Clinician’s Research Digest: Child and Adolescent Populations; both continue to be published by the APA.

In a study funded by the National Institute of Mental Health (NIMH), McLemore was designated as one of thirty master therapists in the United States. Shortly thereafter, McLemore began working as a management psychologist. He continued this work for over thirty years, and his clients included both Fortune 500 corporations and nonprofit institutions.

McLemore has reviewed for American Psychologist and Journal of Clinical and Consulting Psychology. In his writing, McLemore's focus is most often on the subjects of interpersonal and organizational dynamics, ethics, pastoral counseling, marriage, philosophy of religion, theology of relationships, and the psychology of effective leadership.

In 2019, Dr. McLemore was given the American Psychological Association's award for Outstanding Contributions to Continuing Professional Development in Psychology.

== Chapters and articles ==
McLemore has written chapters in four books, including Handbook of Interpersonal Psychotherapy and Personality, Social Skills, and Psychopathology.

He has been the author of over thirty articles, which have appeared in journals such as Behaviour Research & Therapy, Journal of Consulting and Clinical Psychology, Journal of Counseling Psychology, Journal of Personality and Social Psychology, Journal of Personality Disorders, Professional Psychology, Psychiatry, and The Clinical Psychologist. His longest article to date appeared in the American Psychologist; the piece was also one of the longest published in the American Psychologist’s history up to that point, and was on the subject of interpersonal diagnosis.

== Books ==
Christianity for Seekers and Skeptics: Critical Thinking and Passionate Faith (Eugene: Wipf & Stock, 2024).

Staying One: How to Avoid a Make-Believe Marriage (Eugene: Cascade, 2017). Co-authored with Anna M. McLemore.

Inspiring Trust: Strategies for Effective Leadership (Santa Barbara: Praeger, 2014).

Toxic Relationships and How to Change Them: Health and Holiness in Everyday Life (San Francisco: Wiley/Jossey-Bass, 2003).

Street-Smart Ethics: Succeeding in Business without Selling Your Soul (Louisville: Westminster John Knox, 2003).

Honest Christianity: Psychological Strategies for Spiritual Growth (Philadelphia: Westminster, 1984).

Good Guys Finish First (Philadelphia: Westminster, 1983).

The Scandal of Psychotherapy: A Guide for Resolving the Tensions between Faith and Counseling (Wheaton: Tyndale House, 1982).

Clergyman’s Psychological Handbook: Clinical Information for Pastoral Counseling (Grand Rapids: Eerdmans, 1974).
