= James Gilmour =

James Gilmour may refer to:

- Jim Gilmour (boxer), British Olympic boxer
- James Gilmour (Miramichi lumber baron) (1782–1858), entrepreneur
- James Gilmour (missionary) (1843–1891), Scottish Protestant Christian missionary in China and Mongolia
- James Gilmour (politician) (1842–1908), politician in Ontario Canada
- Jim Gilmour (1881–1918), rugby league footballer of the 1910s for New Zealand and Wellington
- Jim Gilmour (RNZN officer), Commander Joint Forces New Zealand
- Jimmy Gilmour (born 1961), Scottish footballer

== See also ==
- James Gilmore (disambiguation)
