= Dave Gilmour (ice hockey, born 1881) =

Canadian ice hockey player

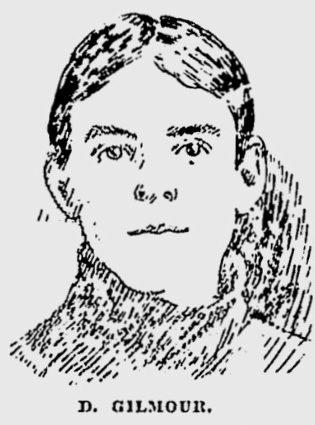
- Sketch while a member of the Ottawa Aberdeens, 1899.
- Born: December 11, 1881 Ottawa, Ontario, Canada
- Died: September 27, 1932 (aged 50)
- Position: Center
- Played for: Ottawa Aberdeens; Ottawa Hockey Club
- Playing career: 1898–1903

David Gordon Gilmour (December 11, 1881 – September 27, 1932) was a Canadian amateur ice hockey player for the Ottawa Silver Seven in the pre-NHL years. He was a member of the Silver Seven era, winning the Stanley Cup in 1903. His brothers Suddy Gilmour and Billy Gilmour also played for Ottawa at the same time. He later became a prominent Ottawa businessman in the lumber industry.

== Career ==
As a youth, Gilmour played several sports. He played ice hockey for the junior Ottawa Aberdeens before joining the senior Ottawa Hockey Club in 1897. He did not become a regular player until several years later, and even then, being a centre had to share ice time with Frank McGee.

== Personal life ==
Born on December 11, 1881, in Ottawa, Gilmour was one of four sons of five children born to Mr. and Mrs. John Gilmour. The other children were Bill, Sutherland (Suddy), Ward, and his sister, Gilbert. Gilmour attended Ashbury College. The family business was lumber, and Gilmour owned a retail and wholesale lumber firm, D.G. Gilmour and Company. His father was a partner in Gilmour and Highson Lumber. Gilmour married Roma King, daughter of Supreme Court justice George Edwin King. They had three children: daughters Hope and Vale and son John. Gilmour died of natural causes while on a hunting trip near Mullin's Lake north of Ottawa in Quebec.

Gilmour is buried at Beechwood Cemetery.
