= Andrew Gilmour (cricketer) =

Zimbabwean cricketer (born 1970)

Personal information
- Full name: Andrew Richard Graham Gilmour
- Born: 4 July 1970 (age 56); Salisbury, Rhodesia
- Batting: Right-handed
- Role: Wicket-keeper

Domestic team information
- Years: Team
- 1994/95–1995/96: Mashonaland
- Source: CricketArchive, 2 May 2016

Andrew Richard Graham Gilmour (born 4 August 1970) is a Zimbabwean first-class cricketer who played for Mashonaland cricket team, Mashonaland Under-24s cricket team in 1994 to 1996 as left-handed wicket-keeper batsman for six first-class match scored 109 runs with 19 catches and 2 stampings. He was born at Salisbury in 1970.
