= Billy Gilmour (ice hockey) =

Canadian ice hockey player (1885–1959)

- Hockey Hall of Fame, 1962
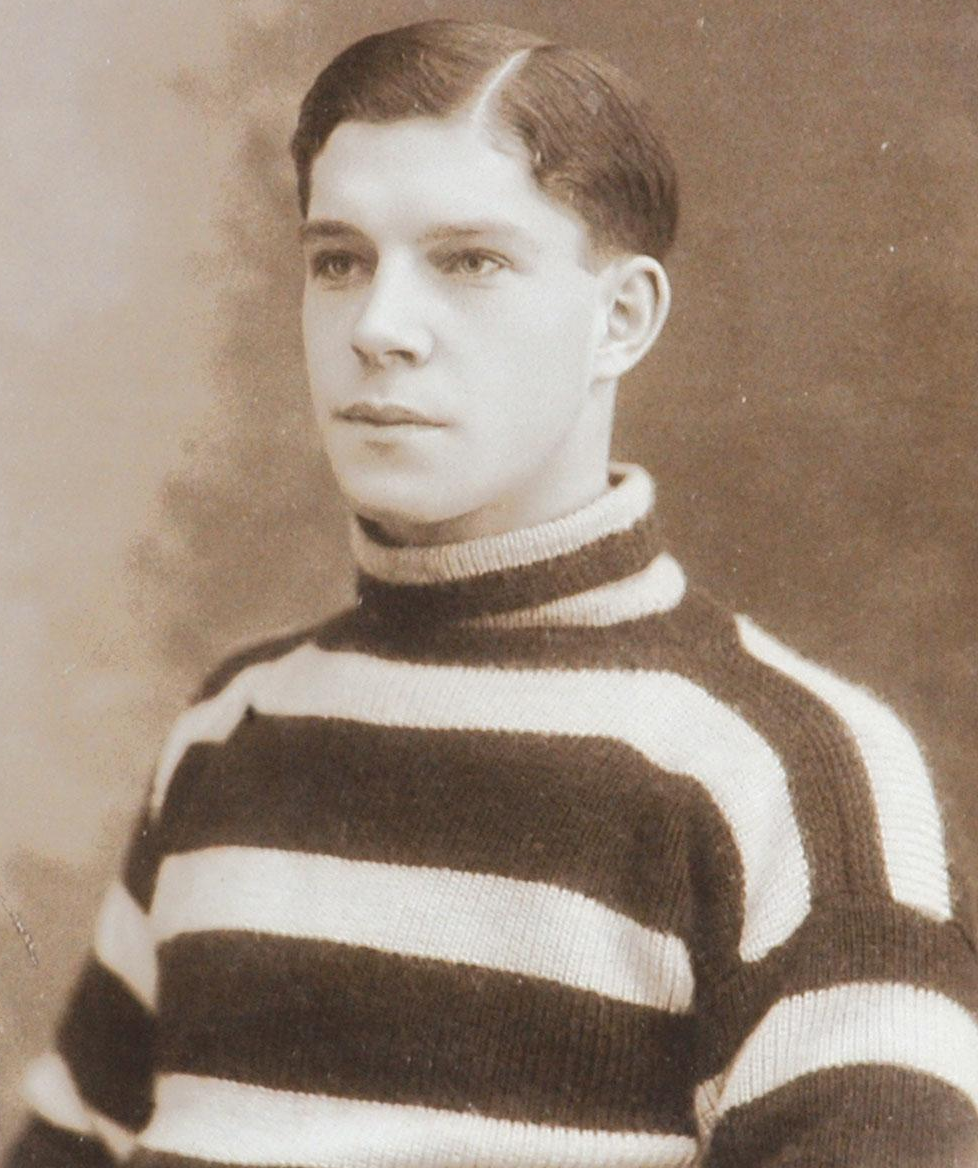
- Billy Gilmour as a member of the Ottawa Hockey Club
- Born: March 21, 1885 Ottawa, Ontario, Canada
- Died: March 13, 1959 (aged 73) Mount Royal, Quebec, Canada
- Position: Right wing
- Played for: Ottawa Hockey Club; Montreal Victorias
- Playing career: 1903–1916

Hamilton Livingstone "Billy" Gilmour (March 21, 1885 – March 13, 1959) was a Canadian professional ice hockey player. A winger, Gilmour played for the Ottawa Hockey Club in the Canadian Amateur Hockey League. Two of his brothers, Suddy Gilmour and Dave Gilmour, also played with Ottawa. He was a member of five Ottawa Stanley Cup championship teams in 1903, 1904, 1905, 1906 and 1909. He also played competitively for the McGill Redmen and Montreal Victorias. He retired from competitive ice hockey in 1909, but returned to play two games for Ottawa in the 1915–16 season.

== Playing career ==
At 15, Gilmour played for the Ottawa Aberdeens in the Canadian Amateur Hockey League intermediate division. He played two seasons with the club and joined the Ottawa Hockey Club for the 1903 season, where he played with his brothers Suddy and Dave. He scored seven goals in six games and was a member of the Stanley Cup championship team that was nicknamed the "Silver Seven", after the silver nuggets the players were given after the Stanley Cup win by team manager Robert Taylor Shillington, who was a part-owner of a silver mine.

Later in 1903, Gilmour moved to Montreal to attend McGill University, where he played college hockey, and joined Ottawa for some Stanley Cup challenge games, in the 1904 and 1905 seasons and a league game in 1906. After finishing McGill in 1907, Gilmour played one season with the Montreal Victorias, scoring five goals in ten games. He returned to Ottawa to join the now-professional Ottawa Hockey Club for the 1908-09 season, scoring nine goals in eleven games as Ottawa won the league and another Stanley Cup championship. In 1909, Gilmour moved to Montreal, married and stopped playing competitive hockey. Gilmour did play some exhibition games for the Ottawa New Edinburghs in 1911, and played two games with the Ottawa Senators of the National Hockey Association (NHA) in 1916.

Gilmour was inducted into the Hockey Hall of Fame in 1962.

== Personal ==
Born in 1885 in Ottawa, Gilmour was one of four sons of five children born to Mr. and Mrs. John Gilmour. The other children were Dave, Sutherland (Suddy), Ward and his sister Gilbert. The family business was lumber, and Gilmour's father was a partner in Gilmour and Highson Lumber. While playing ice hockey for Ottawa, Gilmour was studying engineering at McGill University of Montreal, and later worked as an engineer. At the start of the First World War Gilmour enlisted in the Canadian Expeditionary Force and was commissioned as a lieutenant in the 1st Construction Battalion. He returned to Canada in 1919.

Gilmour married Merle Woods of Montreal and moved to Paris, France before returning to Canada in 1942 to reside in Mount Royal, Quebec, where he lived for the rest of his life.

Gilmour is buried at Beechwood Cemetery in Ottawa.

== Career statistics ==
=== Regular season and playoffs ===
			Regular season					Playoffs
Season	Team	League	GP	G	A	Pts	PIM	GP	G	A	Pts	PIM
1902–03	Ottawa Silver Seven	CAHL	7	10	0	10	3	2	1	0	1	—
1902–03	Ottawa Silver Seven	St-Cup	—	—	—	—	—	2	4	0	4	3
1903–04	McGill College	MCHL	4	5	0	5	12	—	—	—	—	—
1903–04	Ottawa Silver Seven	St-Cup	—	—	—	—	—	3	1	0	1	0
1904–05	McGill College	MCHL	4	5	0	5	12	—	—	—	—	—
1904–05	Ottawa Silver Seven	FAHL	1	0	0	0	0	—	—	—	—	—
1904–05	Ottawa Silver Seven	St-Cup	—	—	—	—	—	2	1	0	1	8
1905–06	Ottawa Silver Seven	ECAHA	1	0	0	0	0	—	—	—	—	—
1905–06	McGill College	MCHL	4	5	0	5	21	—	—	—	—	—
1906–07	McGill College	MCHL	3	2	0	2	8	—	—	—	—	—
1907–08	Montreal Victorias	ECAHA	10	5	0	5	33	—	—	—	—	—
1908–09	Ottawa Senators	ECHA	11	9	0	9	74	—	—	—	—	—
1911–12	Ottawa Senators	NHA	2	1	0	1	0	—	—	—	—	—
ECAHA/ECHA totals			22	14	0	14	107	—	—	—	—	—
St-Cup totals			—	—	—	—	—	7	6	0	6	11
