= Beechwood Cemetery =

National Cemetery of Canada

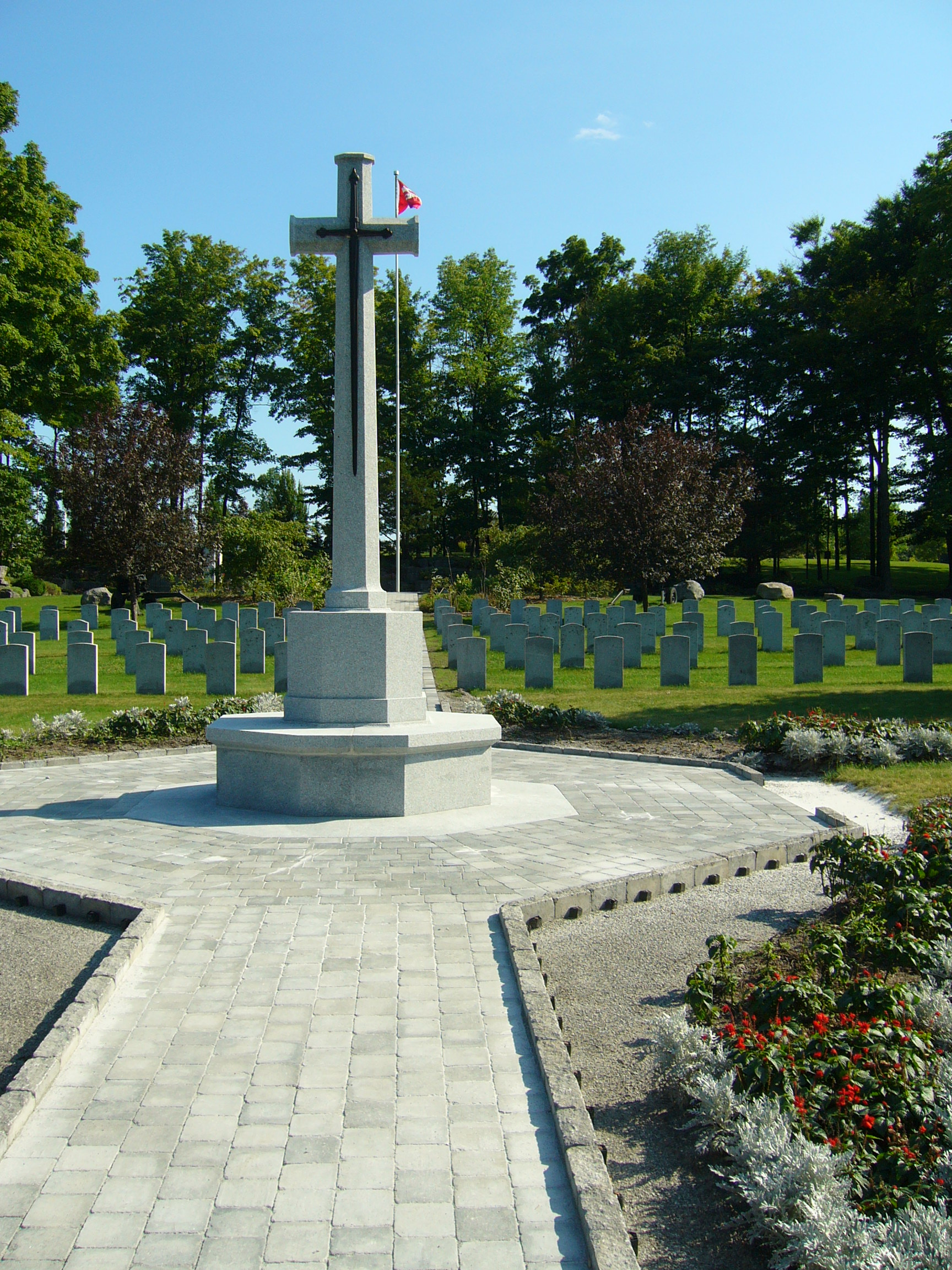
- Cross of Sacrifice erected in honour and memory of all war veterans in 1959
- Interactive map of Beechwood Cemetery
- Location: 280 Beechwood Avenue; Ottawa, Ontario; K1L 8A6

Site notes
- Area: 64.7 hectares (160 acres)
- Architect(s): Moses Chamberlain Edey; Robertson Martin Architects
- Architectural style: Neo-Gothic
- Governing body: The Beechwood Cemetery Foundation; The Beechwood Cemetery Company
- Website: Beechwood Cemetery website

National Historic Site of Canada
- Designated: 2001
Beechwood Cemetery
- Interactive map of Beechwood Cemetery
Details
- Coordinates: 45°26′49.2″N 75°39′36″W
- Type: National cemetery
- No. of graves: Over 82,000

Beechwood Cemetery is the national cemetery of Canada, located in the east end of Ottawa, Ontario. Over 82,000 people are buried in the cemetery, including Governor General Ramon Hnatyshyn, Prime Minister Robert Borden, and several members of Parliament, premiers, Canadian Armed Forces personnel and veterans, Royal Canadian Mounted Police personnel, Canadian Security Intelligence Service intelligence officers, and Hockey Hall of Famers, alongside other notable Canadians. In addition to being Canada's national cemetery, it contains the National Military Cemetery of the Canadian Armed Forces and the National Memorial Cemetery of the RCMP.

== Honours and designations ==
Beechwood has received various honours and designations because it is recognized as an example of 19th-century rural cemeteries and as a place of national significance and importance as a depository of Canadian history. It was designated as a National Historic Site of Canada in 2001. The cemetery has served as the National Military Cemetery of Canada since 2001 and has served since 2004 as the RCMP National Memorial Cemetery. Governor General Michaëlle Jean opened the Beechwood National Memorial Centre on 7 April 2008. In 2017, the Canadian Security Intelligence Service's National Memorial Cemetery was established at Beechwood.

Pipe Major Sergeant Tom Brown is the "on call" piper of the National Military Cemetery at Beechwood, where he can perform up to a dozen outdoor funerals a year.

=== Hall of Colours ===
When new military colours are received or a unit is disbanded, colours are treated with utmost respect to military service and are never destroyed. After being carried on parade for the last time, the colour party presents the colours prior to the ceremony in which they are laid up for safekeeping in the Hall of Colours. Designed by Robertson Martin Architects, the Hall of Colours features a memorial stained glass window featuring an oak tree in leaf honouring Canadian military chaplains. The Hall of Colours was supported by a donation of $50,000 from Dominion Command of the Royal Canadian Legion.

The retired colours of Canada's army, air force, and naval regiments are mounted at ceiling level in the Hall of Colours in the National Memorial Centre. They include:

- Royal Canadian Navy's 30-year-old Queen's Colour (2008)
- 2nd Battalion Royal 22^{e} Régiment Queen's Colour and Regimental Colour
- 2nd Battalion, The Royal Canadian Regiment Queen's Colour and Regimental Colour
- 412 Squadron's retired Standard (2011)
- Royal Canadian Dragoons' 2nd. Guidon (2012)
- Les Fusiliers du S^{t}-Laurent Queen's Colour and Regimental Colour (2012)
- 436 Transport Squadron's retired Standard (2012)
- 400 Tactical Helicopter Squadron's Standard (2013)
- 411 Tactical Helicopter Squadron's Standard (2013)
- 3rd Battalion, The Royal Canadian Regiment's Regimental Colour (2014)

== History ==
In the 1870s, smallpox and other infectious diseases were very prevalent in Ottawa. In an attempt to prevent the spread of these diseases, the City of Ottawa passed a bylaw in January 1872 which prohibited the burial of human remains within the city's limits after December 31, 1872. As a result, the Sandy Hill Cemetery, located within the city limits, was closed. The city's Protestant churches opened Beechwood Cemetery, while the Catholics established Notre-Dame Cemetery.

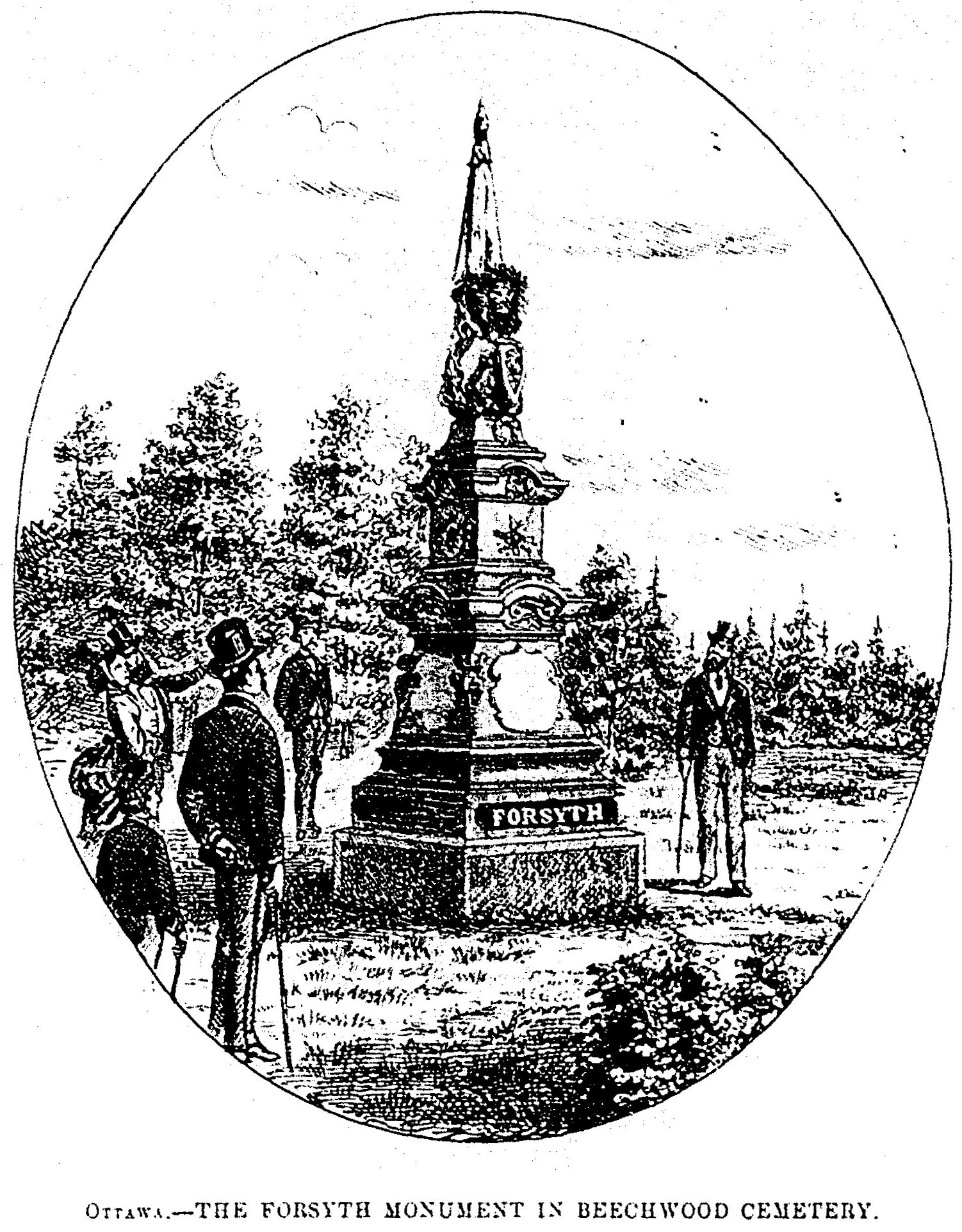
An illustration of the monument to Captain James Forsyth in Beechwood Cemetery

Many of the early burials at Beechwood were remains moved from Sandy Hill, which had been used by the Anglican, Presbyterian, Wesleyan Methodist, and Catholic Churches since the 1840s.

The first monument in the cemetery was erected by members and friends of the 2nd Ottawa Field Battery and unveiled on September 13, 1873. The sculptured monument of granite, sandstone, and Italian marble was dedicated to the memory of their former commander, Captain James Forsyth.

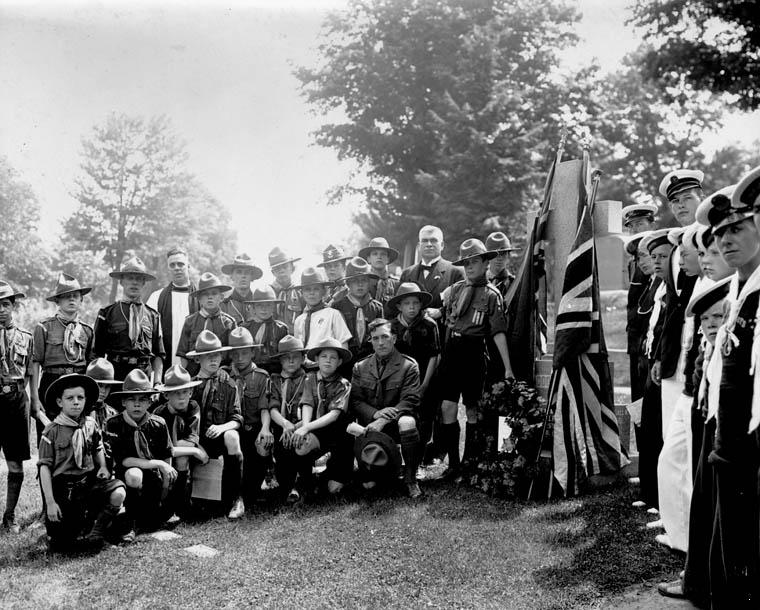
Boy Scouts placing wreaths on the graves of William McDougall and Hewitt Bernard, Fathers of Confederation, in Beechwood Cemetery in 1927 in commemoration of the golden jubilee of Canadian Confederation

Canadian soldiers who were killed in the line of duty and war veterans have been buried in Beechwood Cemetery since the North-West Rebellion of 1885. The cemetery contains the National Military Cemetery which consists of two sections managed by the Commonwealth War Graves Commission, a Veterans Section owned by Veterans Affairs Canada, and the National Military Cemetery of the Canadian Forces, created in 2001 and owned and managed by the federal Department of National Defence.

The cemetery inspired a classic Canadian poem "In Beechwood Cemetery" by Archibald Lampman with its memorable final line, "They know no season but the end of time."

Moses Chamberlain Edey designed the cemetery entrance gates in 1891.

The Commonwealth War Graves Commission is responsible for the graves of 98 Commonwealth (mainly Canadian) service personnel of World War I and 113 of World War II. The commission also maintains the Ottawa Cremation Memorial, in a shelter adjoining the newer of the veterans' plots, which lists 26 personnel who were cremated in Canada and the US in World War II.

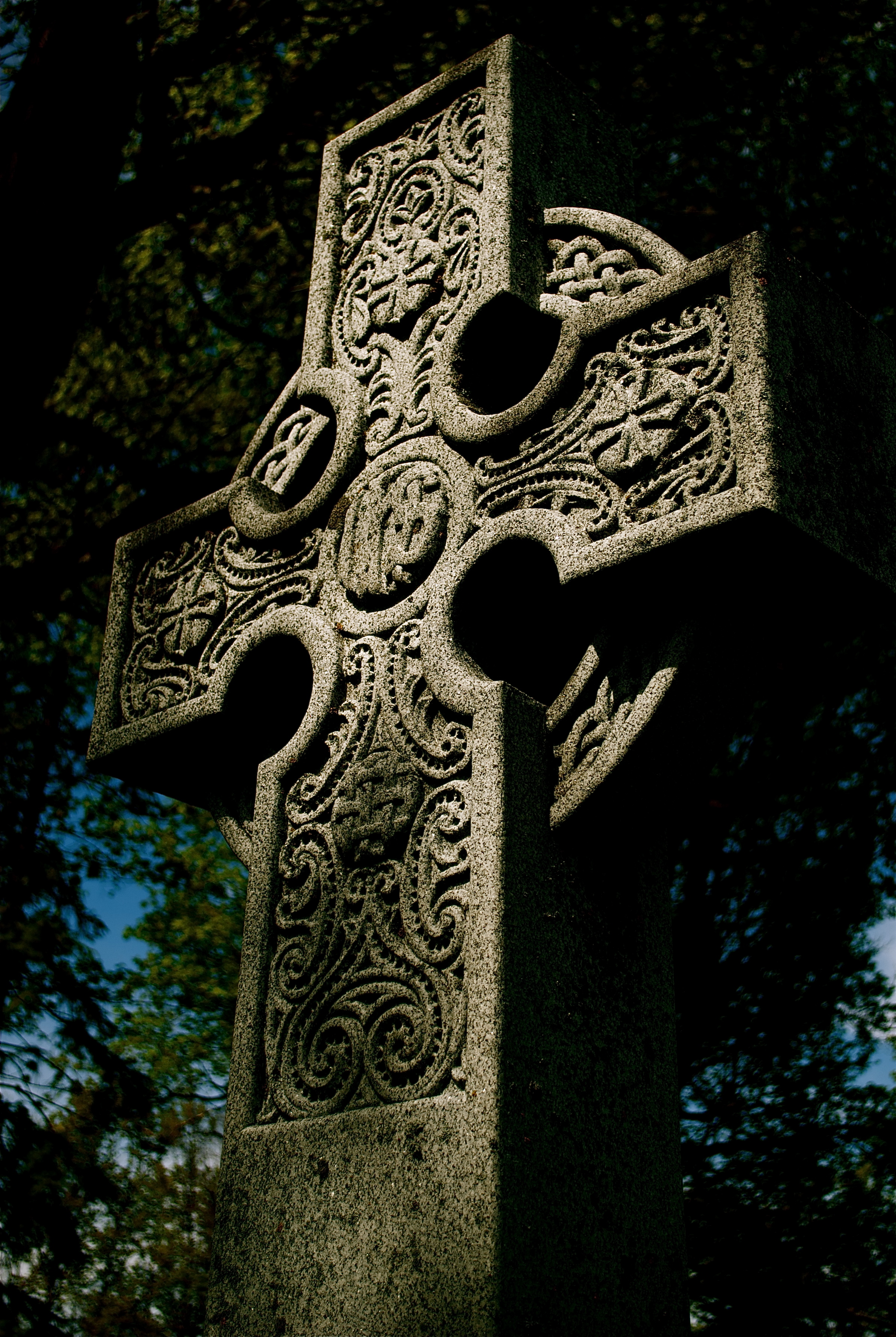
Celtic cross at Beechwood Cemetery

Noted for its Neo-Gothic architecture, the mausoleum at Beechwood was built by Canada Mausoleums Ltd. in the early 1930s. After a few years of operation, in a time of depression and financial difficulties, the mausoleum became the property of the cemetery. The building features stained glass windows designed by noted stained glass artist James Blomfield.

The Commonwealth War Graves Commission erected a memorial, known as a Cross of Sacrifice, incorporating a bronze sword inlayed in a granite cross in memory of the war dead buried in the cemetery's field of honour.

On 5 March 2009 Environment Minister Jim Prentice introduced legislation to designate Beechwood as the National Cemetery of Canada due to "its location here in our national capital, Beechwood serves as a focal point for our national memorial events, including Remembrance Day, and it is an appropriate place to conduct state burials." This was done to "serve as an important symbol of Canadian unity and pride and a means of preserving and promoting Canada's rich history and our diversity." The bill was passed on March 6. The bill received royal assent on April 23, 2009.

The multi-faith aspects include a monument to Our Lady of Fatima, Élisabeth Bruyère, St. Marie-Marguerite d'Youville, St. Charbel (for the Lebanese community) and a pagoda in the Chinese section of the cemetery and an Aboriginal Tribute Garden.

== Interments ==
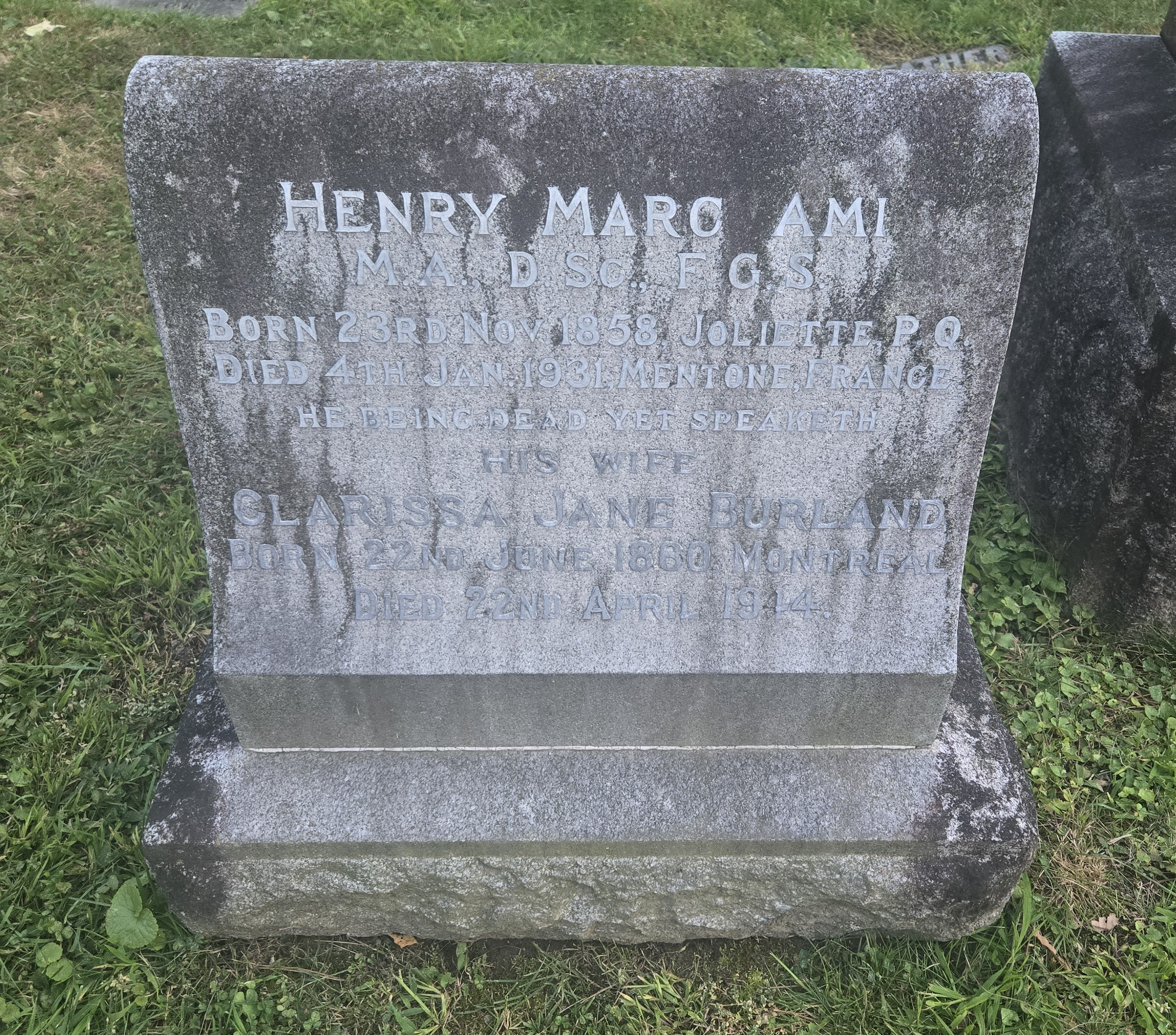
Grave site of Henri-Marc Ami (inscribed as Henry Marc), and his wife Clarissa Jane Burland.

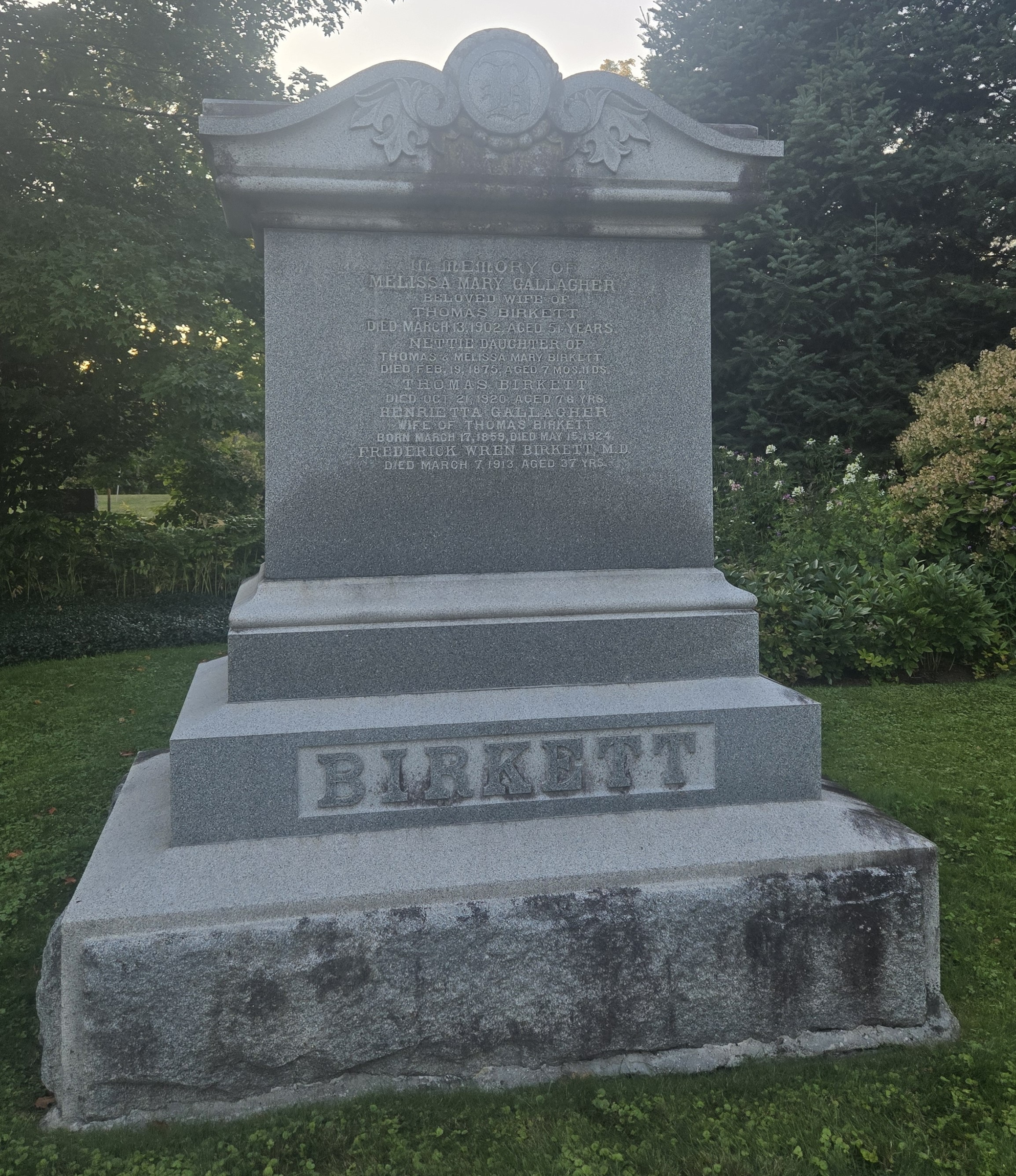
Grave site of Thomas Birkett, his wives Mary and Henrietta Gallagher, daughter Nettie, and son Frederick.

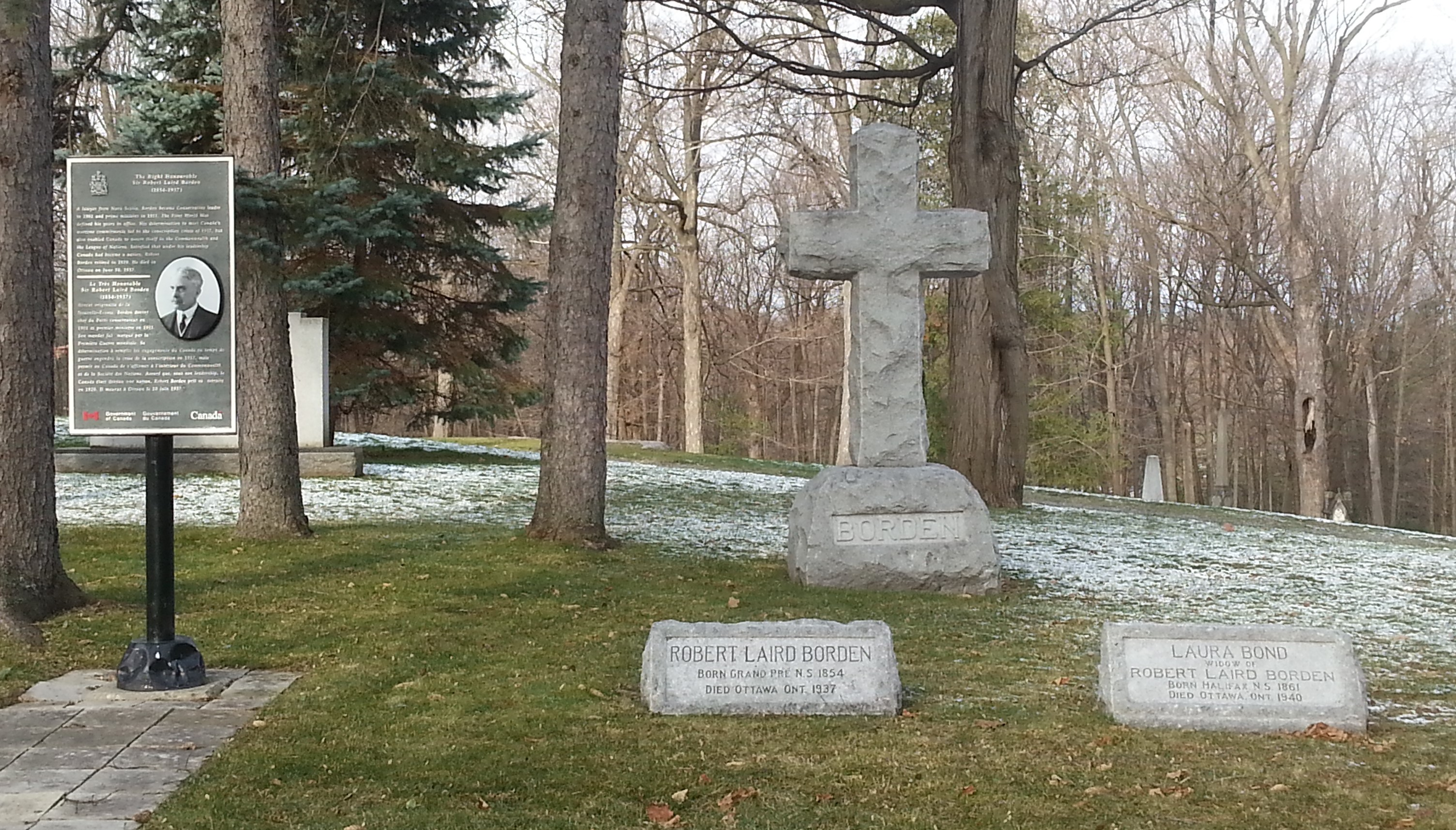
Grave site of Prime Minister Sir Robert Borden.

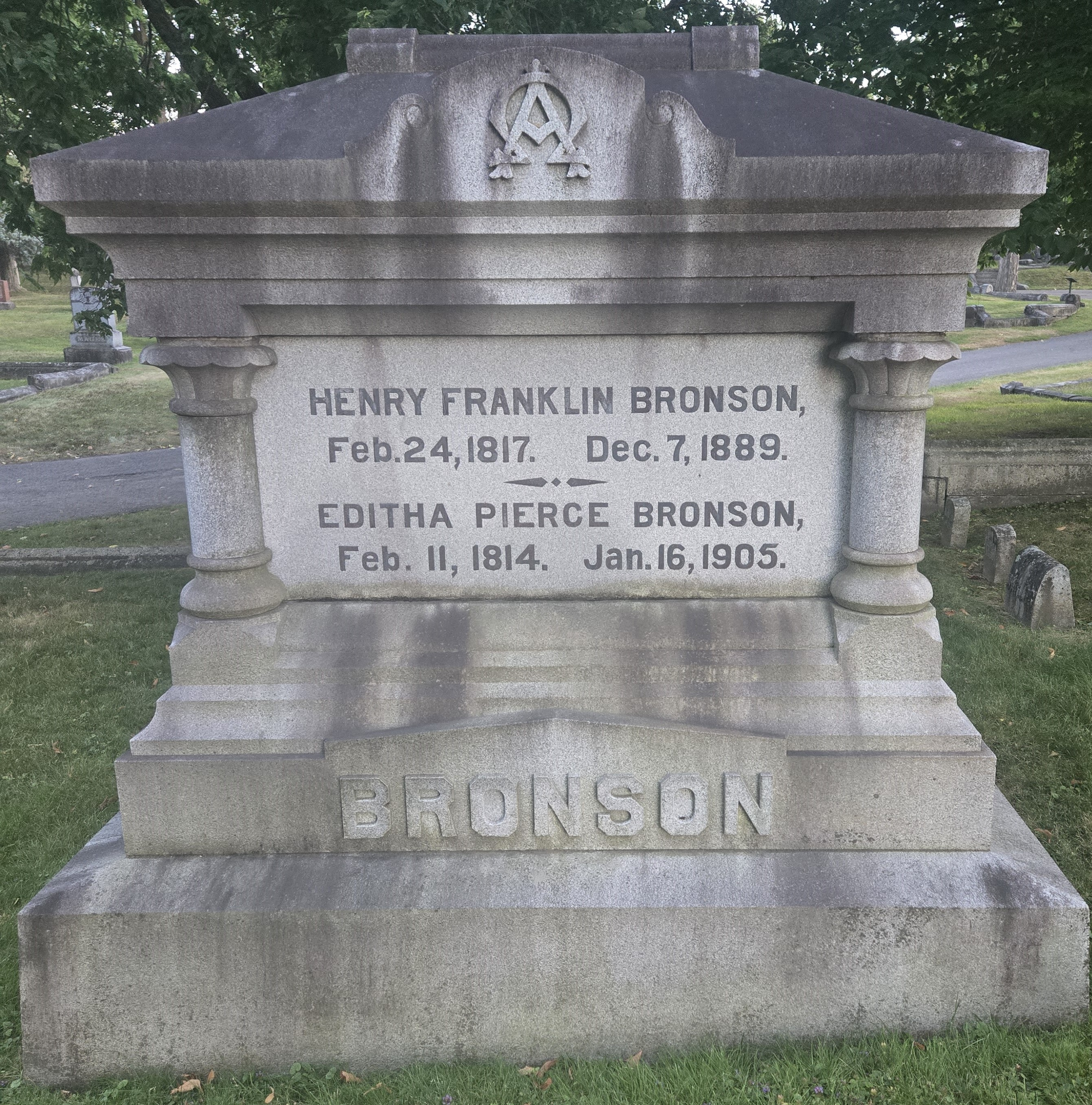
Grave site of Henry Franklin Bronson, and his wife Editha.

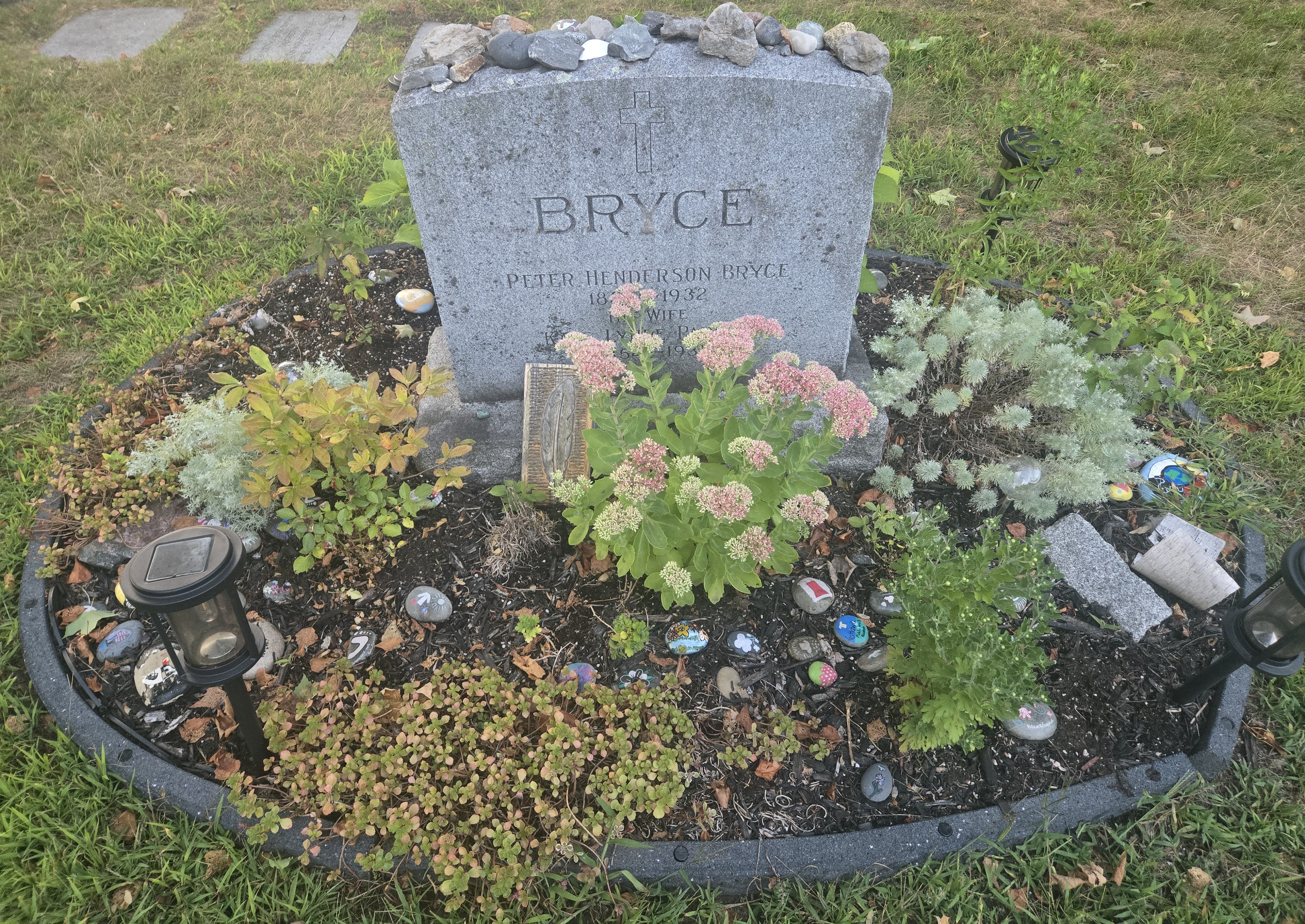
Grave site of Peter Bryce.

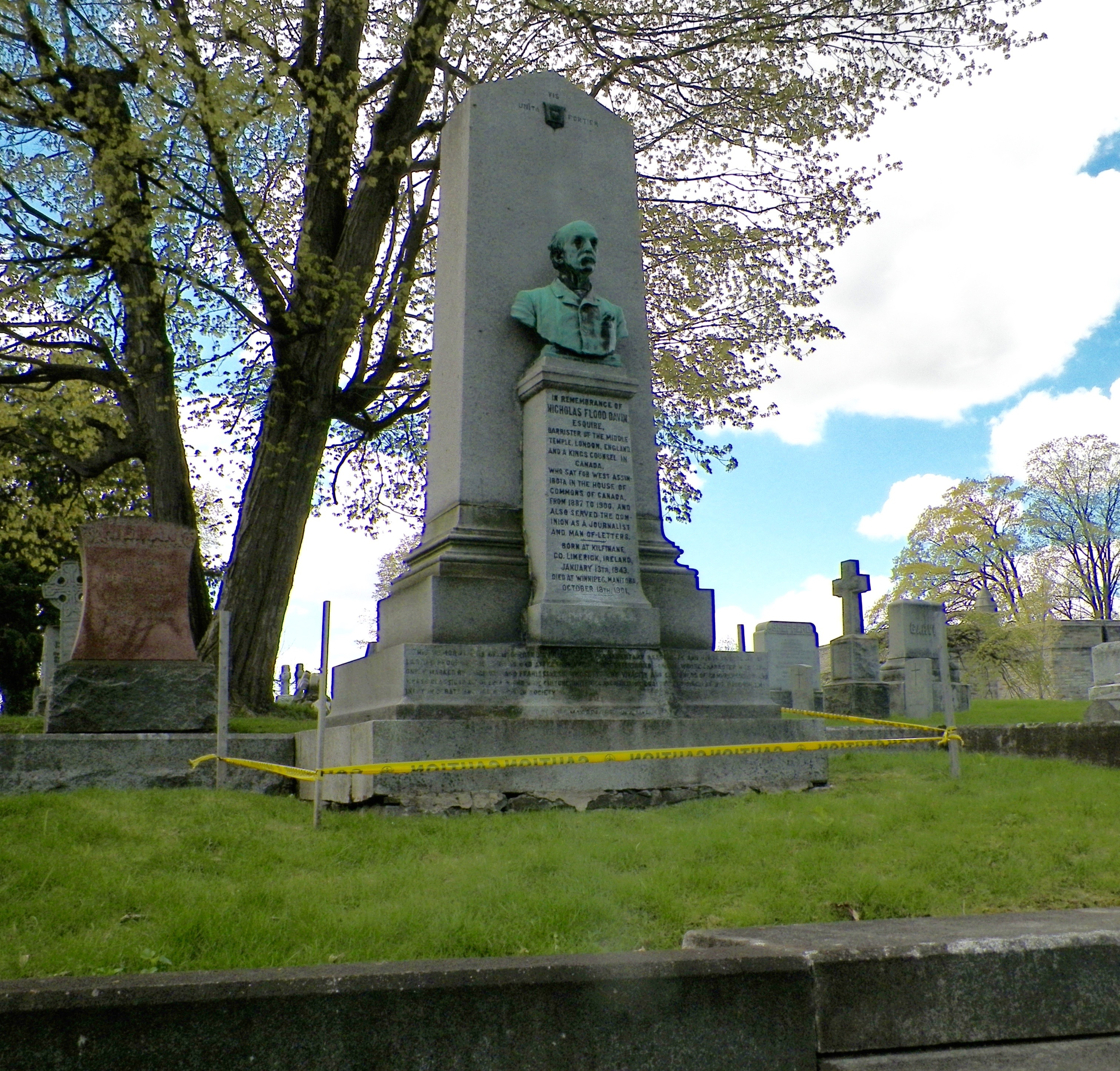
Grave site of Nicholas Flood Davin.

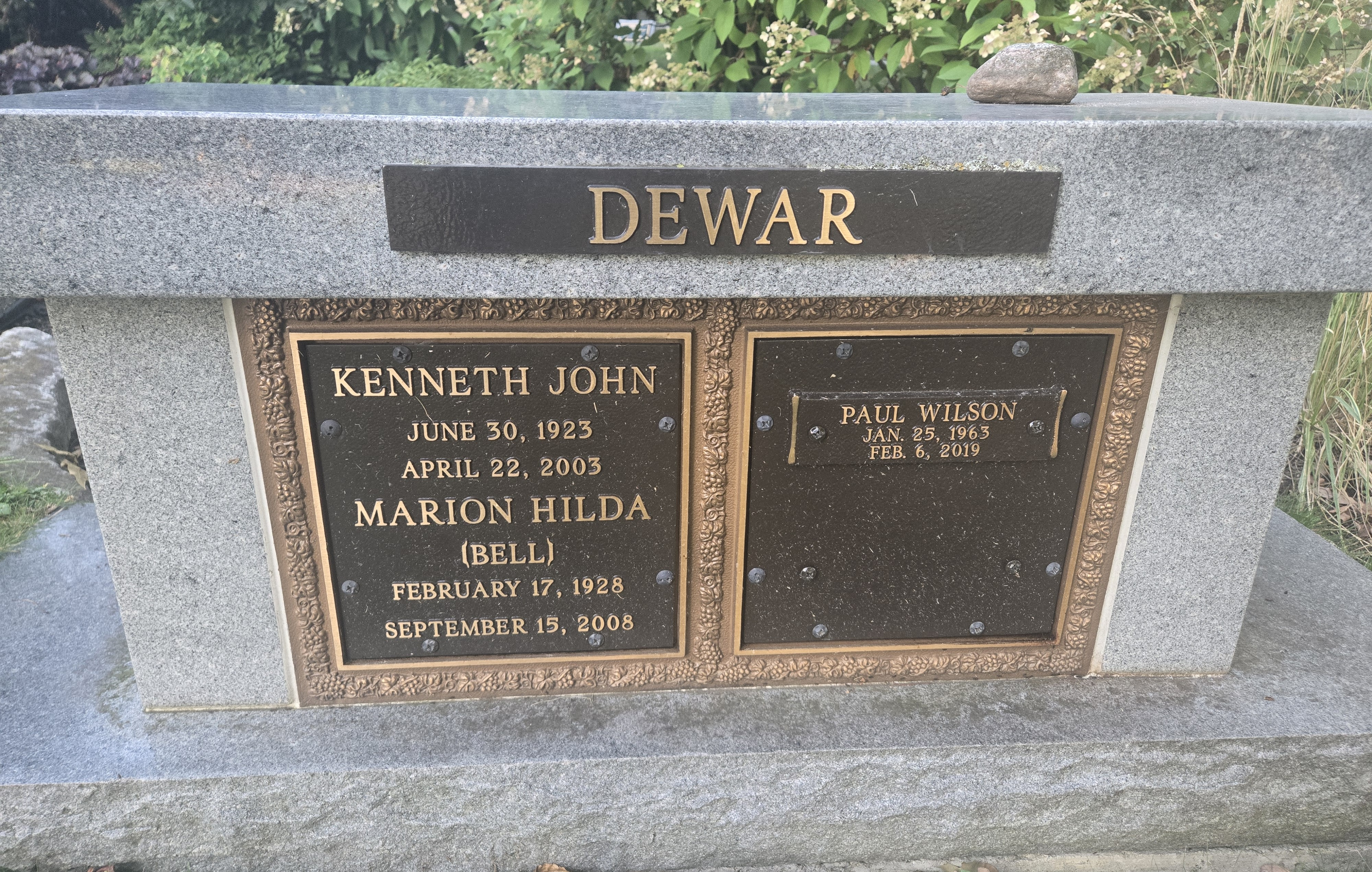
Grave site of Marion Dewar, her husband Kenneth, and son Paul.

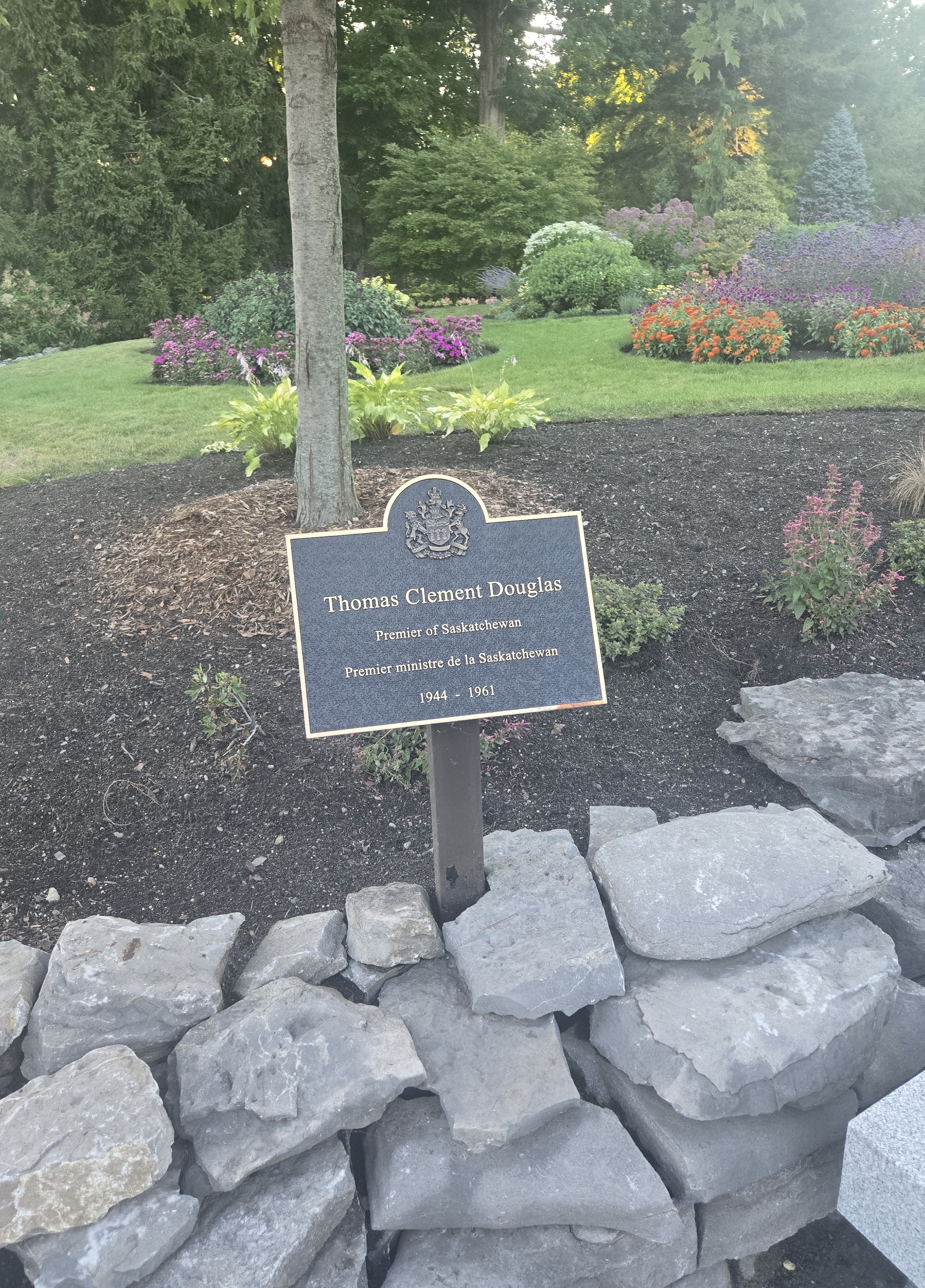
Grave site of Tommy Douglas.

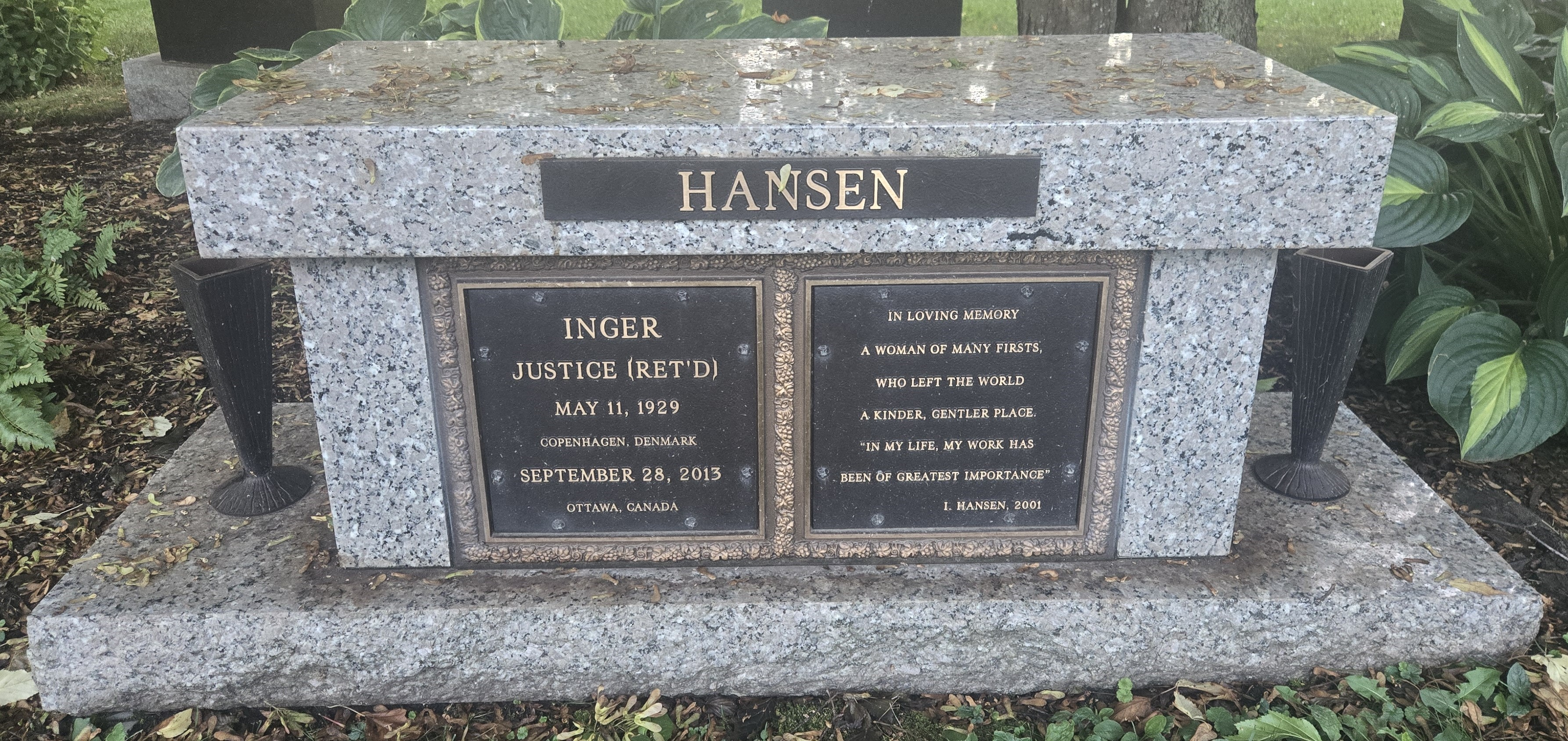
Grave site of Inger Hansen.

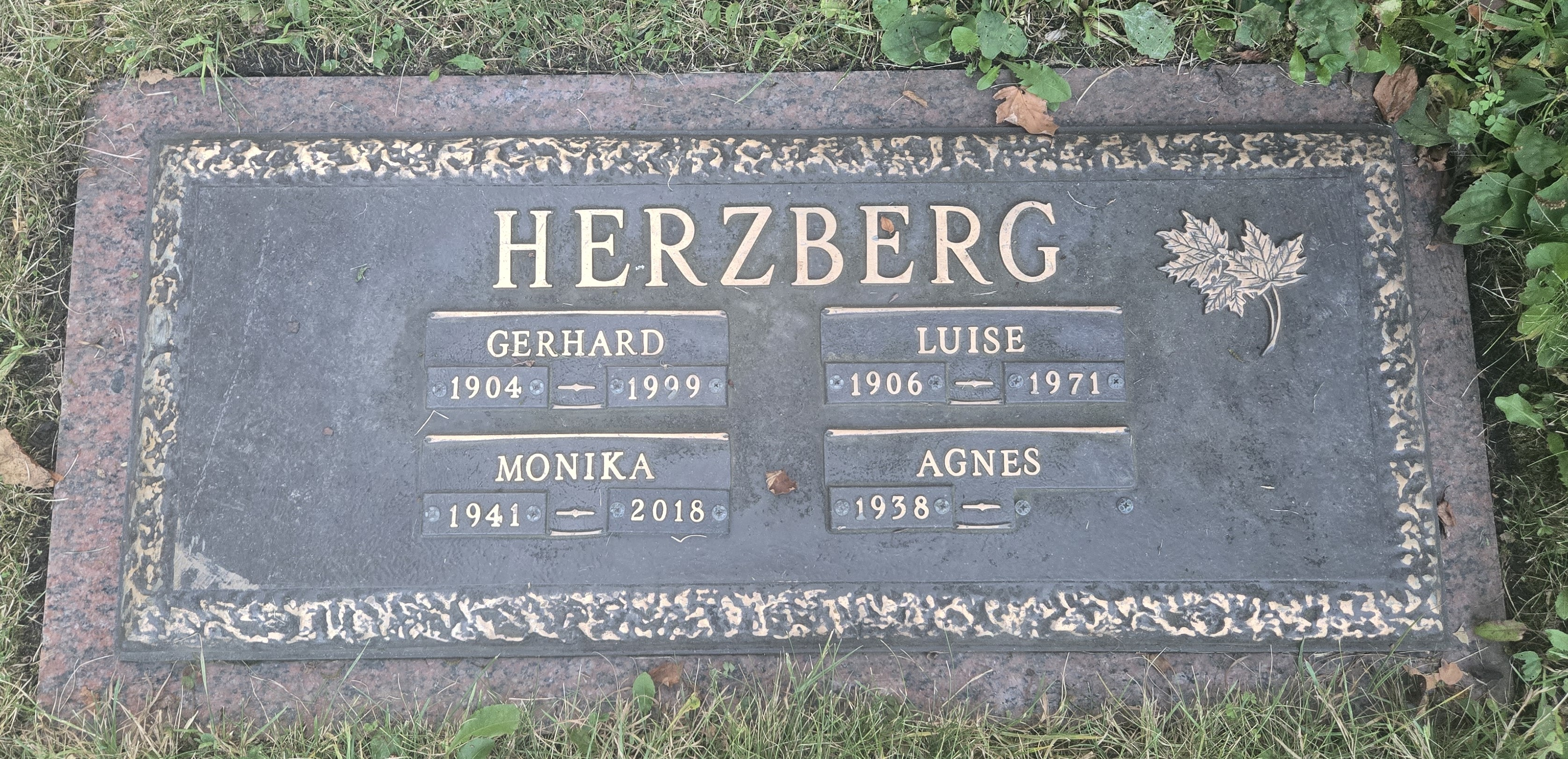
Grave site of Gerhard Herzberg, and wives Luise and Monika.

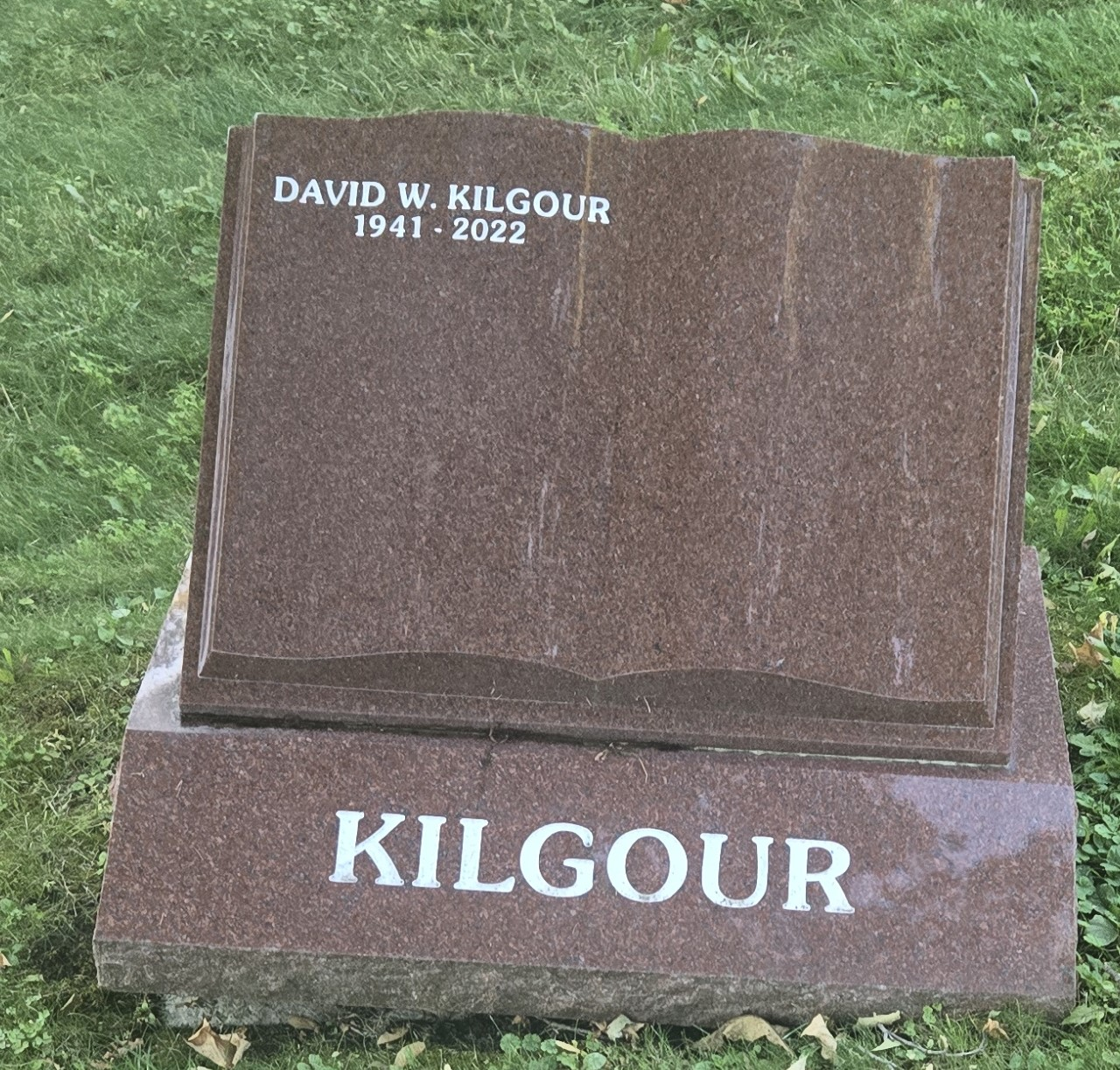
Grave site of David Kilgour.

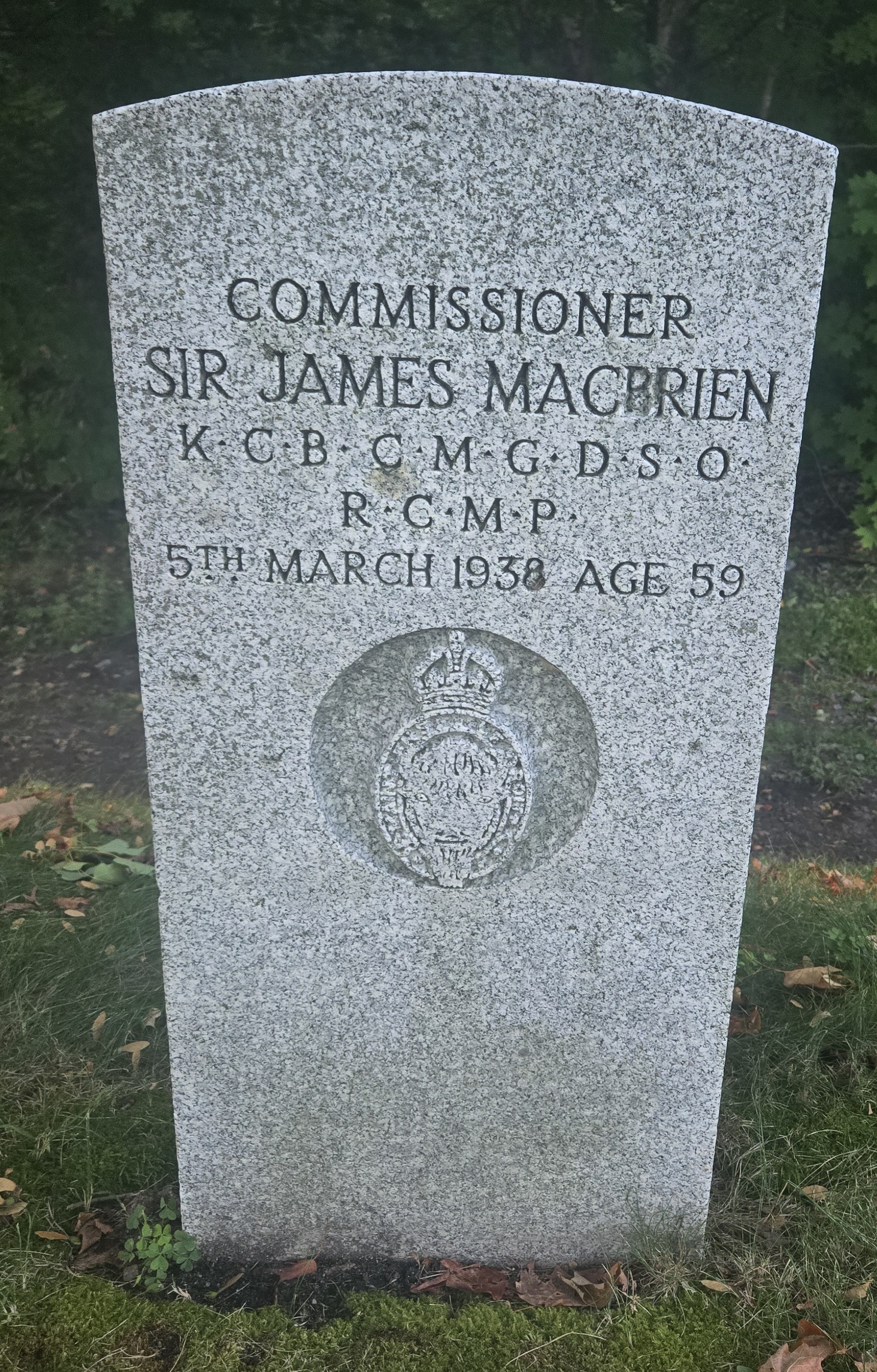
Grave site of Sir James Howden MacBrien.

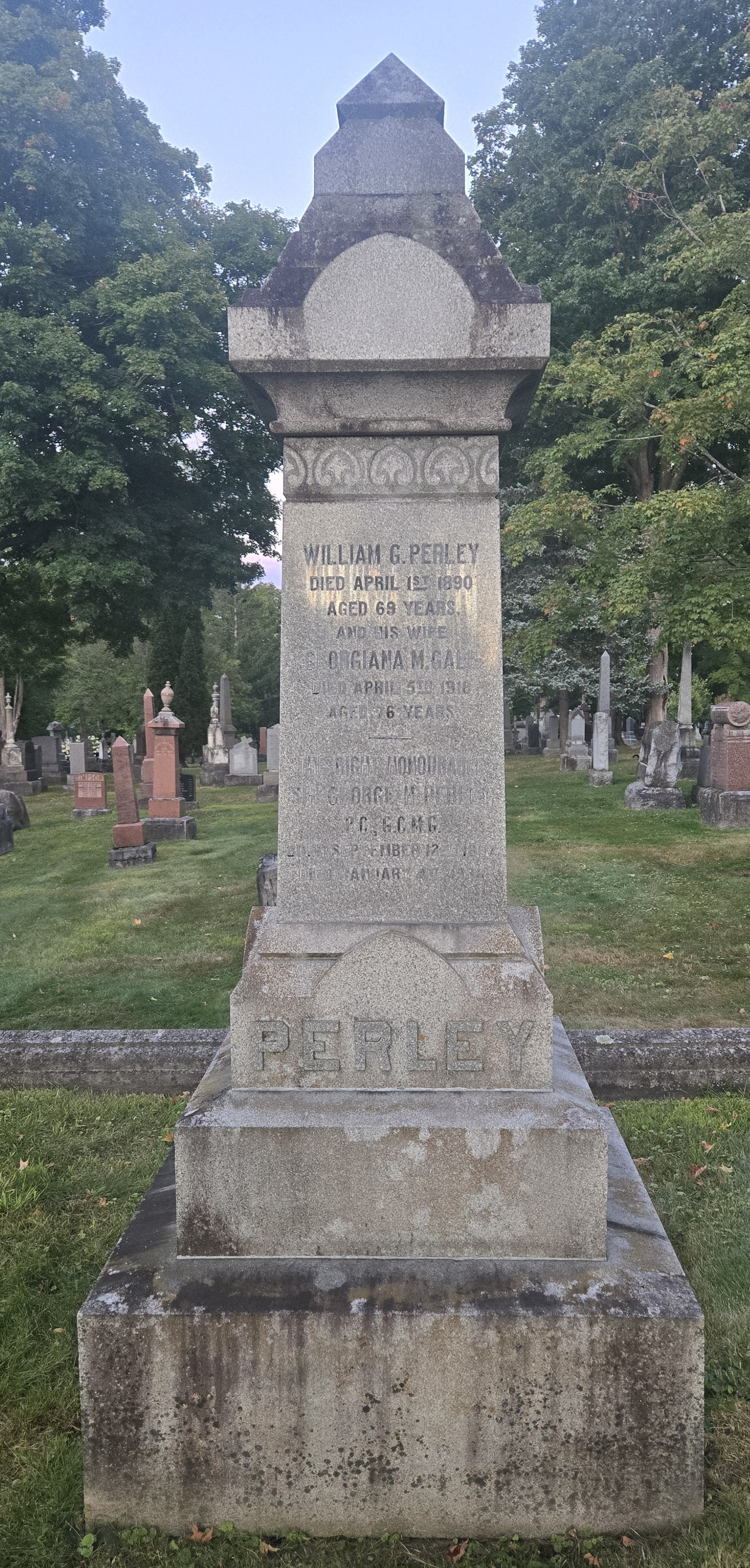
Grave site of William Goodhue Perley, his wife Georgina Gale, and son Sir George Halsey.

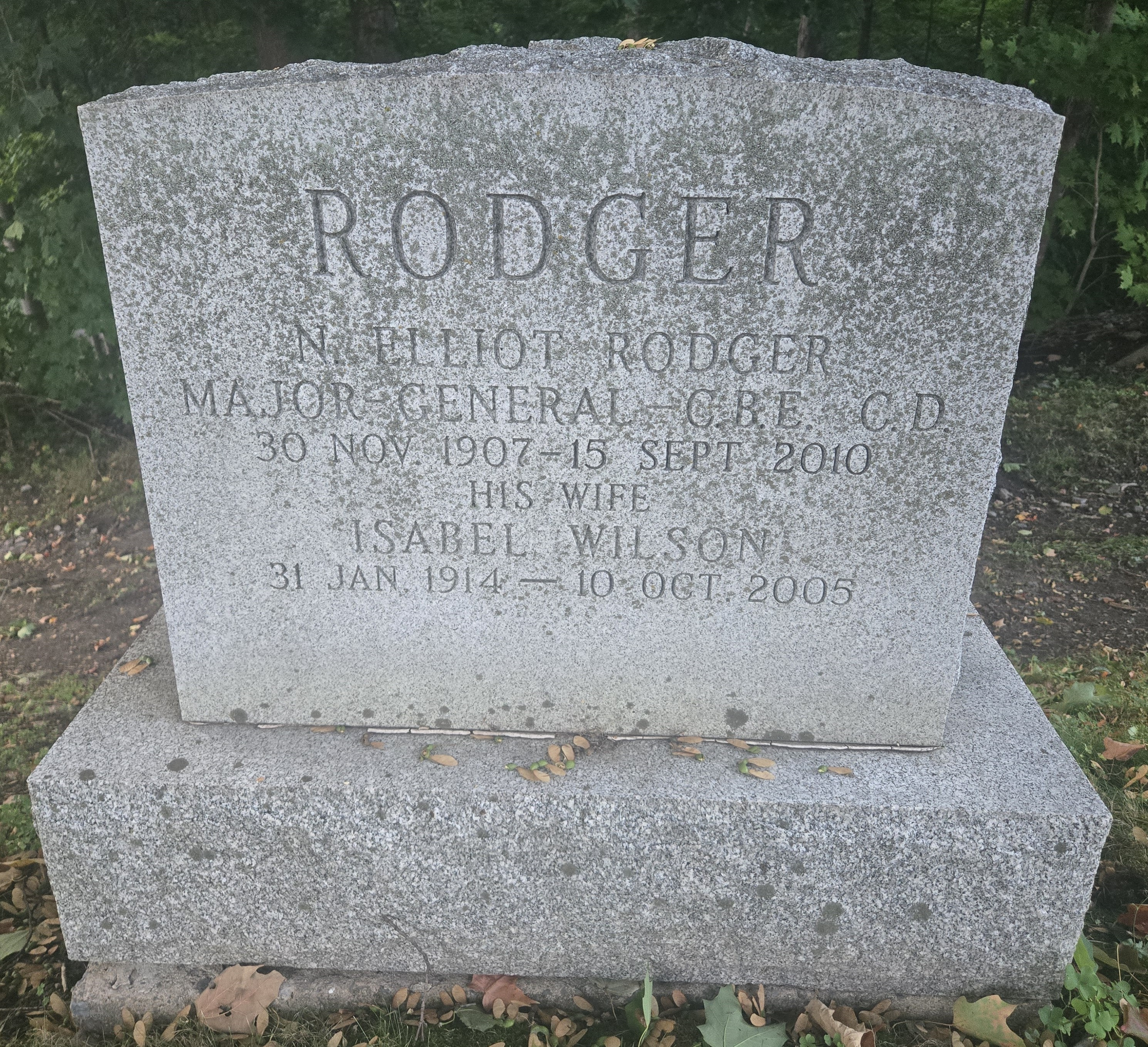
Grave site of Norman Elliot Rodger, and his wife Isabel Wilson.

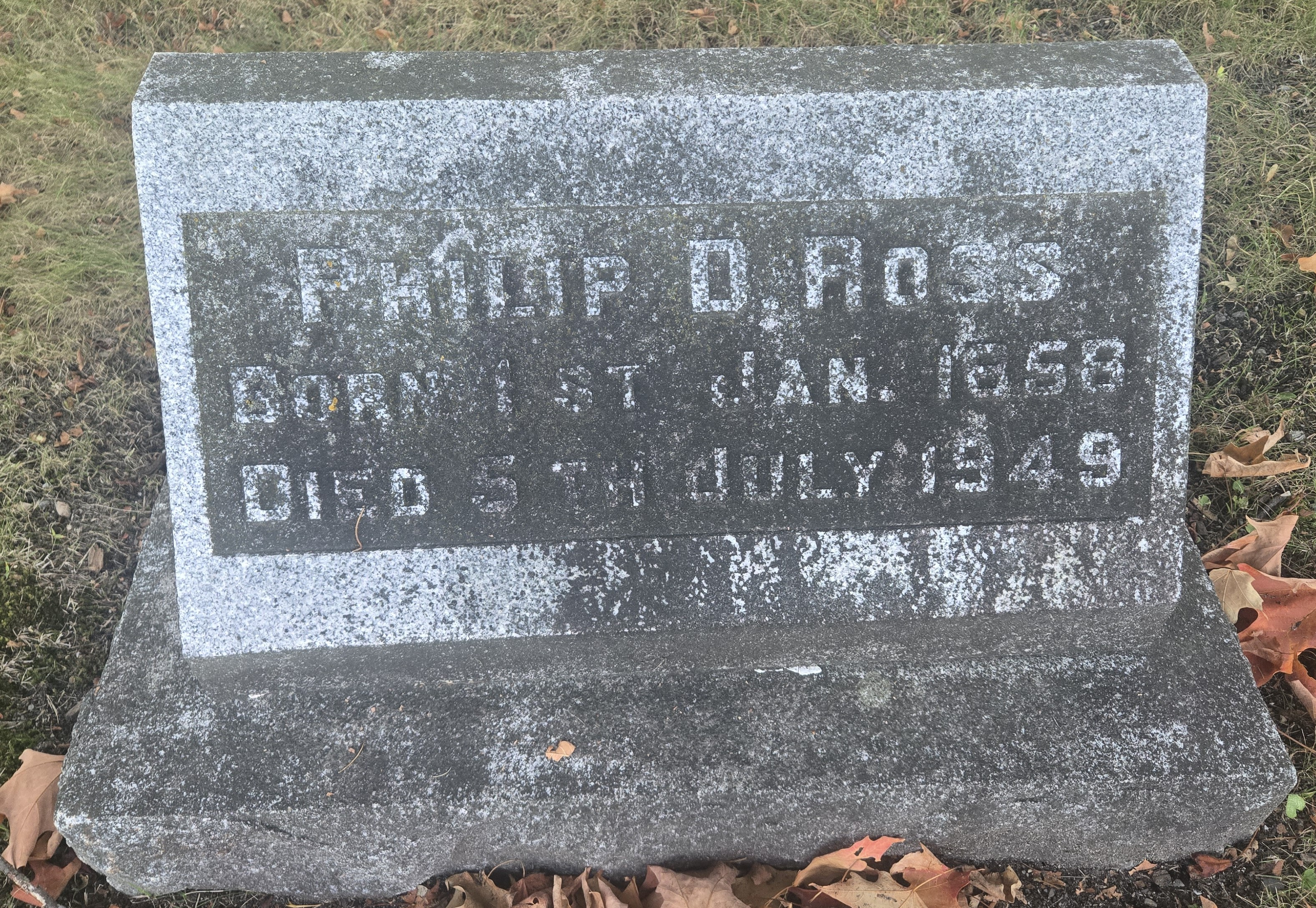
Grave site of Philip Ross.

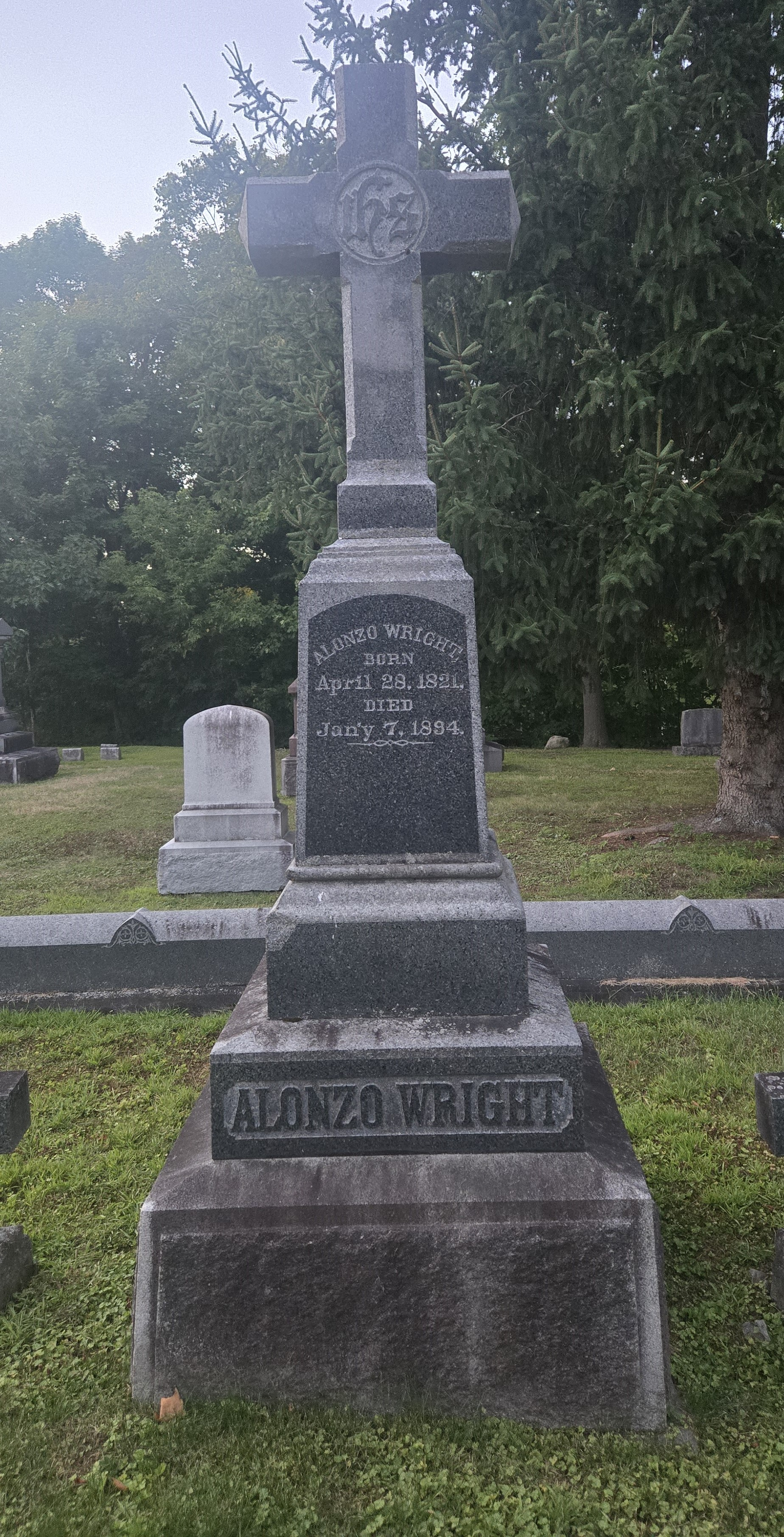
Grave site of Alonzo Wright.

A full list of notable individuals buried at Beechwood can be found on the cemetery's website.

List by death year:

- Thomas McKay (1792–1855), businessman, a founder of the city of Ottawa
- Louis-Théodore Besserer (1785–1861), businessman, notary, politician
- John Bower Lewis (1817–1874), mayor of Bytown (1848–1849), mayor of Ottawa (1855–1857)
- William Henry Lee (1799–1878), civil servant, first Clerk of the Privy Council (1867–1872)
- Maria Hill (1791–1881), surgeon's assistant, heroine of the War of 1812
- Joseph Merrill Currier (1820–1884), politician, businessman
- James Skead (1817–1884), businessman, politician
- Edward McGillivray (1815–1885), mayor of Ottawa (1858–1859)
- Robert Lyon (1829–1888), mayor of Ottawa (1867)
- Henry Franklin Bronson (1817–1889), lumber baron
- William Goodhue Perley (1820–1890), businessman, politician
- Alexander Workman (1798–1891), mayor of Ottawa (1860–1862)
- C. W. Bangs (1814–1892), mayor of Ottawa (1878)
- William Pittman Lett (1819–1892), journalist, bureaucrat, poet
- Sir William Johnstone Ritchie (1813–1892), second Chief Justice of Canada
- Hewitt Bernard (1825–1893), lawyer, Father of Confederation
- Alfred Edmonds (1821–1893), artist, draughtsman, cartographer
- Alonzo Wright (1821–1894), businessman, politician
- John Rochester (1822–1894), industrialist, mayor of Ottawa (1870–1871)
- Henry Wentworth Monk (1827–1896), Canadian Christian Zionist
- Moss Kent Dickinson (1822–1897), mayor of Ottawa (1864–1866)
- Thomas Fuller (1823–1898), architect, designer of the Parliament Buildings of Canada
- William Kingsford (1819–1898), historian, civil engineer
- Archibald Lampman (1861–1899), poet
- William H. Hurdman (1818–1901), entrepreneur, community leader
- Nicholas Flood Davin (1840–1901), lawyer, journalist, politician
- Douglas Brymner (1823–1902), journalist, civil servant, archivist
- Sir John George Bourinot (1837–1902), historian, political scientist, newspaper publisher
- William McDougall (1822–1905), lawyer, politician, Father of Confederation
- Sir Henry Newell Bate (1833–1906), Canadian industrialist, first Chairman of the National Improvement Commission (National Capital Commission), founder of Beechwood Cemetery, Founder of All Saints Anglican Church (Ottawa)
- Andrew George Blair (1844–1907), statesman, Premier of New Brunswick
- John Mather (1827–1907), businessman, millwright, machinist
- Hod Stuart (1879–1907), ice hockey player, member of Hockey Hall of Fame
- James Fletcher (1852–1908), entomologist, botanist, writer
- Sir Samuel Henry Strong (1825–1909), 3rd Chief Justice of Canada (1892–1902)
- George Cox (1834–1909), mayor of Ottawa (1894)
- James Davidson (1856–1913), mayor of Ottawa (1901)
- Henry James Morgan (1842–1913), civil servant, lawyer, editor
- Archibald Blue (1840–1914), teacher, journalist, civil servant
- Thomas Keefer (1821–1915), civil engineer
- Walker Powell (1828–1915), businessman, militia officer, politician
- Sir Sandford Fleming (1827–1915), engineer, inventor
- Thomas Willson (1860–1915), inventor
- Henry Newell Bate (1828–1917), industrialist, first chairman of the Ottawa Improvement Commission
- J. P. Featherston (1830–1917), mayor of Ottawa (1874–1875)
- William Dawson LeSueur (1840–1917), civil servant, author
- Wilfred Campbell (1858–1918), poet
- Sir Cecil Spring Rice (1859–1918), British Ambassador to the United States
- Sir Collingwood Schreiber (1831–1918), surveyor, engineer, civil servant
- Harris Harding Bligh (1842–1918), lawyer and librarian
- Hamby Shore (1886–1916), ice hockey player
- Moses Chamberlain Edey (1845–1919), architect
- Lawrence Lambe (1863–1919), geologist, palaeontologist, ecologist
- James Grant (1831–1920), physician, politician
- Sir Donald Alexander Macdonald (1845–1920), militia officer
- John Macoun (1831–1920), noted naturalist after which the Macoun marsh wild life area in the cemetery is named
- John Mortimer Courtney (1838–1920), civil servant
- Erskine Henry Bronson (1844–1920), businessman, politician
- Thomas Birkett (1844–1920), mayor of Ottawa (1891)
- Arthur L. Sifton (1858–1921), statesman, Premier of Alberta
- David Ewart (1841–1921), Chief Dominion Architect (1896–1914)
- William Cameron Edwards (1844–1921), businessman, politician
- John Gunion Rutherford (1857–1923), veterinarian, civil servant, politician
- Otto Julius Klotz (1852–1923), astronomer, surveyor
- Louis Henry Davies (1845–1924), 3rd Premier of Prince Edward Island (1876–1879), 6th Chief Justice of Canada (1901–1918)
- Henry Watters (1853–1924), mayor of Ottawa (1924)
- Jack Darragh (1890–1924), ice hockey player, member of the Hockey Hall of Fame
- Roberta Elizabeth Odell Tilton (1837–1925), social reformer, co-founder of the National Council of Women of Canada
- Sir Edward Morrison (1867–1925), journalist, Canadian Army officer
- John Rudolphus Booth (1827–1925), lumber tycoon
- McLeod Stewart (1847–1926), mayor of Ottawa (1887–1888)
- William P. Anderson (1851–1927), civil engineer
- James White (1863–1928), geographer, chief draftsman for the Geological Survey of Canada
- William Borthwick (1848–1928), mayor of Ottawa (1895–1896)
- Harold Fisher (1877–1928), mayor of Ottawa (1917–1920)
- James Colebrooke Patterson (1839–1929), federal cabinet minister, 6th Lieutenant Governor of Manitoba (1895–1900)
- William Stevens Fielding (1848–1929), 7th Premier of Nova Scotia (1884–1896)
- Frederick Montizambert (1843–1929), physician, public servant, member of the Canadian Medical Hall of Fame
- Henry Joseph Woodside (1858–1929), businessman, journalist, photographer
- James Wilson Robertson (1857–1930), educator, cheese producer
- James Creighton or J.G.A. Creighton (1850–1930), 'father' of organized ice hockey, law clerk of the Senate
- William James Topley (1845–1930), photographer
- Robert A. Hastey (1847–1930), mayor of Ottawa (1906)
- Frank Maurice Stinson Jenkins (1859–1930), founder, and the first captain of the Ottawa Hockey Club, orchestra conductor
- Henri-Marc Ami (1858–1931), archaeologist
- Charles Spittal (1874–1931), ice hockey player, soldier
- Charles Hopewell (1861–1931), mayor of Ottawa (1909–1912)
- Marian Osborne (1871–1931), writer
- Edmund Leslie Newcombe (1851–1931), lawyer, civil servant, member of the Supreme Court of Canada (1924–1931)
- Charles H. Mackintosh (1843–1931), Lieutenant Governor of the Northwest Territories, 1893–1898, Member of Parliament, 13th Mayor of Ottawa, (1879–1881), owner/editor of the Ottawa Citizen (1874–1892)
- Sir George Eulas Foster (1847–1931), politician
- Peter Bryce (1853–1932), public health physician
- Suddy Gilmour (1883–1932), ice hockey player
- Charles Keefer (1852–1932), engineer
- Andrew Haydon (1867–1932), lawyer, senator
- Dave Gilmour (1881–1932), ice hockey player
- Laurance Lyon (1875–1932), Member of the UK Parliament
- J. S. Ewart (1849–1933), advocate for Canadian independence
- James A. Ellis (1864–1934), mayor of Ottawa (1904–1906, 1913)
- Arthur A. C. Moore (1880–1935), ice hockey player and rugby football player
- John J. Allen (1871–1935), mayor of Ottawa (1931–1933)
- Edward H. Hinchey (1872–1936), mayor of Ottawa (1912)
- Sir Robert Borden (1854–1937), 8th Prime Minister of Canada
- Eddie Gerard (1890–1937), Hall of Fame ice hockey player
- William James Roche (1859–1937), politician
- Sir George Halsey Perley (1857–1938), federal cabinet minister, Canadian High Commissioner to the United Kingdom (1914–1922)
- Sir James Howden MacBrien (1878–1938), Chief of the General Staff of the Canadian Militia (1920–1927), Commissioner of the Royal Canadian Mounted Police (1931–1938)
- Martin Burrell (1858–1938), politician, federal cabinet minister
- Thomas Ahearn (1855–1938), inventor and businessman
- Eric Brown (1877–1939), first director of the National Gallery of Canada
- Ernest Alexander Cruikshank (1853–1939), military historian, first chairman of the Historic Sites and Monuments Board of Canada
- Hamilton MacCarthy (1846–1939), sculptor
- Laura Borden (1861–1940), wife of Sir Robert Borden, 8th Prime Minister of Canada
- Sir Percy Sherwood (1854–1940), Chief Commissioner of the Dominion Police Force (1885–1919)
- Harvey Pulford (1875–1940), Hall of Fame ice hockey player
- Edgar Nelson Rhodes (1877–1942), Speaker of the House of Commons (1917–1922), 10th Premier of Nova Scotia (1925–1930)
- Albert Peter Low (1861–1942), geologist, explorer, athlete
- Ted Dey (1864–1943), owner of the Ottawa Senators (1917–1923)
- Fred Cook (1858–1943), mayor of Ottawa (1902–1903)
- Sedley Cudmore (1878–1945), economist, academic, Dominion Statistician (1942–1945)
- Kenneth Stuart (1891–1945), Canadian Army officer
- Franklin Brownell (1857–1946), landscape painter, draughtsman, teacher
- Gordon Cameron Edwards (1866–1946), politician, lumber merchant
- Charles Stewart (1868–1946), politician, Premier of Alberta
- Henry Marshall Tory (1864–1947), academic, first president of the National Research Council (1928–1935)
- Percy Algernon Taverner (1875–1947), ornithologist
- Duncan Campbell Scott (1862–1947), civil servant, poet, pose writer
- John Duncan MacLean (1873–1948), teacher, physician, politician and the 20th Premier of British Columbia
- Philip Ross (1858–1949), journalist, newspaper publisher, ice hockey administrator, member of the Hockey Hall of Fame
- Rockliffe Fellowes (1884–1950), actor
- Humphrey Mitchell (1894–1950), politician, trade unionist, Minister of Labour (1941–1950)
- Taylor McVeity (1857–1951), mayor of Ottawa (1914)
- Thomas W. Fuller (1865–1951), architect
- Harold Edwards (1892–1952), Royal Canadian Air Force officer, member of Canada's Aviation Hall of Fame
- Frank H. Plant (1883–1952), businessman, mayor of Ottawa (1921–1923, 1930)
- Guy Owen (1913–1952), figure skater
- Harry Puddicombe (1870–1953), composer, pianist, music educator, founder of the Canadian Conservatory of Music
- George P. MacKenzie (1873–1954), educator, politician, Gold Commissioner of Yukon (1918–1924)
- Daniel McCann (1887–1954), politician, Deputy Mayor of Ottawa (1953–1954)
- James Bernard Harkin (1875–1955), 1st Commissioner of the Dominion Parks Branch (1911–1936)
- Lyman Duff (1865–1955), Chief Justice of Canada (1933–1944)
- Rat Westwick (1876–1957), ice hockey player, lacrosse player, member of the Hockey Hall of Fame
- Charles Camsell (1876–1958), geologist, Commissioner of the Northwest Territories (1936–1946)
- Horace Merrill (1884–1958), ice hockey player, canoeist
- Billy Gilmour (1885–1959), ice hockey player
- Dave McCann (1889–1959), Canadian football player, coach, official, member of the Canadian Football Hall of Fame
- Robert H. Coats (1874–1960), first Dominion Statistician
- Georges Boucher (1895–1960), ice hockey player
- Nelson D. Porter (1863–1961), mayor of Ottawa (1915–1916)
- Rudolph Martin Anderson (1876–1961), zoologist and explorer
- Faith Fyles (1875–1961), pioneering Canadian government female botanist and artist
- Bruce Stuart (1881–1961), ice hockey player, member of the Hockey Hall of Fame
- Bouse Hutton (1877–1962), ice hockey player, lacrosse player, Canadian football player, member of the Hockey Hall of Fame
- T. Franklin Ahearn (1886–1962), politician and businessman. Owner of the Ottawa Senators in the 1920s.
- W.E. Noffke (1878–1964), architect
- Henry Crerar (1888–1965), Canadian Army General and diplomat
- Madge Macbeth (1878–1965), writer
- Andrew McNaughton (1887–1966), Commander-in-Chief Canadian 1st Army in WW II, statesman
- Edgar Archibald (1885–1968), agricultural scientist
- William Arthur Steel (1890–1968), Canadian radio pioneer
- Arthur Bourinot (1893–1969), lawyer, scholar, poet
- Diamond Jenness (1886–1969), anthropologist
- Charles Foulkes (1903–1969), Canadian Army General, Chairman of the Chiefs of Staff, negotiated the WWII Nazi surrender in the Netherlands
- Eddie Emerson (1892–1970), Canadian football player, member of the Canadian Football Hall of Fame
- Ernest Reed (1909–1970), Anglican Bishop of Ottawa (1954–1970)
- J. E. Stanley Lewis (1888–1970), mayor of Ottawa (1936–1948)
- Harry L. 'Punch' Broadbent (1892–1971), Hall of Fame ice hockey player
- Harry Helman (1894–1971), ice hockey player
- Melville Rogers (1899–1973), Olympic figure skater, figure skating judge
- Alan Beddoe (1893–1975), artist, first president of the Heraldry Society of Canada
- Clint Benedict (1894–1976), Hall of Fame ice hockey player
- Cecil Duncan (1893–1979), Canadian Amateur Hockey Association president
- Johnny Fauquier (1909–1981), Hall of Fame aviator, WWII hero, DFC, DSO
- Howard Clark (1901–1983), Primate of the Anglican Church of Canada (1959–1971)
- Maurice Lamontagne (1917–1983), economist, politician, federal cabinet minister
- Tommy Douglas (1904–1986), politician, voted "The Greatest Canadian"
- Horatio Nelson Lay (1903–1988), naval officer with the Royal Canadian Navy
- Kenneth Fogarty (1923–1989), mayor of Ottawa (1970–1972)
- Daniel Spry (1913–1989), Canadian Army officer
- Milt Halliday (1906–1989), ice hockey player
- John Currie (1910–1989), Olympic cross-country skier
- Desmond Smith (1911–1991), Canadian Army officer
- George Klein (1904–1992), inventor
- Gordon F. Henderson (1912–1993), lawyer, Chancellor of the University of Ottawa
- Thomas G. Fuller (1908–1994), Royal Canadian Navy officer
- Bill Beveridge (1909–1995), ice hockey goaltender
- Denis Coolican (1913–1995), businessman, Regional Chair of Ottawa–Carleton (1968–1978)
- Michael Dare (1917–1996), Vice Chief of the Defence Staff (1969–1972)
- Halvor Heggtveit (1907–1996), cross-country skier
- Hardial Bains (1939–1997), founder of the Marxist Leninist Party of Canada
- Marion Adams Macpherson (1924–1998), diplomat
- Gerhard Herzberg (1904–1999), physicist, physical chemist, Nobel Prize in Chemistry winner (1971)
- Ruth Wildgen (1921–1999), politician, activist
- George H. Nelms (1905–1999), mayor of Ottawa (1957–1960)
- Violet Archer (1913–2000), composer, teacher, musician
- Fulgence Charpentier (1897–2001), journalist, politician, diplomat
- Ivan Rival (1947–2002), mathematician, computer scientist, academic
- Ray Hnatyshyn (1934–2002), statesman, Governor General of Canada
- Lou Lefaive (1928–2002), Canadian sports administrator and civil servant
- John Newlove (1938–2003), poet
- Nichola Goddard (1980–2006), CAPT, Royal Canadian Horse Artillery. First Canadian female soldier killed in action
- Bertha Wilson (1923–2007), first female member of the Supreme Court of Canada (1982–1991)
- Marion Dewar (1928–2008), mayor of Ottawa (1978–1985)
- John Ryerson Maybee (1918–2009), diplomat, Royal Canadian Navy officer
- Maurice Nadon (1920–2009), former Royal Canadian Mounted Police Commissioner
- Norman Elliot Rodger (1907–2010), senior Canadian Army officer
- Olive Dickason (1920–2011), historian, journalist
- Jean Pigott (1924–2012), politician, chair of the National Capital Commission (1985–1992)
- Thomas Delworth (1929–2012), diplomat, academic
- Inger Hansen (1929–2013), first Privacy Commissioner of Canada (1977–1983), Information Commissioner of Canada (1983–1990)
- Clifford Chadderton (1919–2013), World War II veteran, CEO of The War Amps
- Jim MacNeill (1928–2016), consultant, environmentalist, international public servant
- Mauril Bélanger (1955–2016), Member of Parliament for Ottawa—Vanier
- George Springate (1938–2018), Canadian football player, politician, judge
- Paul Dewar (1963–2019), educator, politician
- David Kilgour (1941–2022), human rights activist, author, politician

== See also ==
- List of national cemeteries by country
- National Memorial Ride
