= Canadian Field-Naturalist =

- Discipline: Natural history
- Language: English
- Edited by: Dwayne Lepitzki

Publication details
- Former names: Transactions of the Ottawa Field-Naturalists' Club; The Ottawa Naturalist
- History: 1880–present
- Frequency: Quarterly
- Open access: Delayed

Standard abbreviations
- ISO 4: Can. Field-Nat.

Indexing
- ISSN: 0008-3550

Links
- Journal homepage

The Canadian Field-Naturalist is a quarterly scientific journal publishing original scientific papers related to natural history in North America. It accepts submissions by both amateur and professional naturalists and field biologists. It is a delayed open access journal currently edited by Dwayne Lepitzki.

== History ==
The Canadian Field-Naturalist has been published continuously since 1880, under several names during its early years. For 7 years, beginning in 1880, the Ottawa Field-Naturalists' Club issued the Transactions of the Ottawa Field-Naturalists' Club annually. With volume 2 in 1887, the Transactions became a subtitle of volume 1 of The Ottawa Naturalist, a monthly publication. With volume 3 of The Ottawa Naturalist in 1889 the emphasis changed from local members' reports to national ones, and in 1919 the journal was renamed The Canadian Field-Naturalist (starting with volume 33 which was volume 35 of the Transactions, but this subtitle was subsequently dropped).

== Society ==
The Ottawa Field-Naturalists' Club was founded in 1879. It is the oldest natural history society in Canada. It has over 1000 members, with interests in all aspects of the natural world, from birds to botany and conservation.

Notable members have included:

- Henri-Marc Ami (1858–1931), president 1899–1901
- James Fletcher (1852–1908), founding member
- Charles Gordon Hewitt (1885–1920), president
- John Macoun (1831–1920), explorer and naturalist
- Irwin M. Brodo (1935-), lichenologist
