= Ottawa Field-Naturalists' Club =

Ottawa Field Naturalists' Club
- Founded: 1863 and incorporated in 1879
- Purpose: Natural history, Wildlife conservation, Nature conservation, Environmentalism
- Location: Ottawa, Ontario
- Region served: 50 km radius of Centre Block of Parliament of Canada
- Method: Education, citizen science, field research, conservation
- Members: Approximately 900
- Revenue: $122,000 (2023-24)
- Volunteers: 250
- Website: ofnc.ca

The Ottawa Field Naturalists' Club was founded in 1863 and incorporated in 1879. It is the oldest natural history society in Canada. It has over 800 members, with interests in all aspects of the natural world, from birds, to insects, to botany, and conservation.

The club offers funding to researchers conducting local field research, about $15,000 per year and a maximum of $5,000 per grant.

== Canadian Field-Naturalist ==
The Canadian Field-Naturalist is a quarterly scientific journal published by the Ottawa Field Naturalists' Club. The journal publishes original scientific papers related to natural history in North America. It accepts submissions by both amateur and professional naturalists and field biologists. The journal also publishes reviews of recently-published books relevant to the natural history of Canada.

The Canadian Field-Naturalist has been published continuously since 1880, under several names during its early years. For 7 years beginning in 1880, the Ottawa Field-Naturalists' Club issued the Transactions of the Ottawa Field-Naturalists' Club annually. With volume 2 in 1887, the Transactions became a subtitle of volume 1 of The Ottawa Naturalist, a monthly publication. With volume 3 of The Ottawa Naturalist in 1889 the emphasis changed from local members' reports to national ones, and in 1919 the journal was renamed The Canadian Field-Naturalist (starting with volume 33 which was volume 35 of the Transactions but this subtitle was subsequently dropped).

Notable members have included:

- Henri-Marc Ami (1858–1931), president 1899–1901
- Irwin M. Brodo (1935–), lichenologist
- James Fletcher (1852–1908), founding member
- Charles Gordon Hewitt (1885–1920), president
- John Macoun (1831–1920), explorer and naturalist
