= Charles Gordon Hewitt =

Canadian entomologist

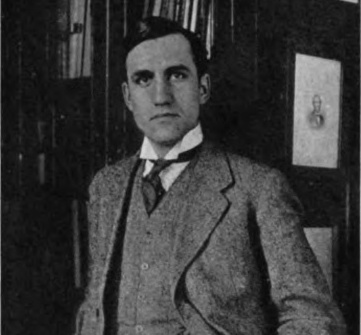
Charles Gordon Hewitt

Charles Gordon Hewitt (February 23, 1885 – February 29, 1920) was a Canadian economic entomologist and pioneer of conservation biology. He was appointed dominion entomologist of Canada in 1909. He helped in the development of the Destructive Insect and Pest Act of 1910, and implemented significant changes in the Department of Agriculture. He published several books on the subjects of biology and entomology, and helped to further the 1916 treaty between Canada and the United States for the protection of migratory birds.

== Early life and education ==
Hewitt was born in Macclesfield, England on February 23, 1885. His parents were Thomas Henry Hewitt and Rachel Frost. Hewitt studied at the King Edward VI Grammar School in Macclesfield, and subsequently attended the University of Manchester from 1902 to 1909. He received a BSc in 1902, an MSc in 1903 and a DSc in 1909 from that university, and was appointed assistant lecturer in zoology in 1902 and lecturer in economic zoology in 1909. He was also a Member of the Manchester Literary and Philosophical Society and served as Secretary (1908–9).

== Department of Agriculture ==
=== Expansion of entomology services ===
Hewitt was appointed dominion entomologist of Canada in May 1909, the second to hold that post, succeeding James Fletcher. He travelled to Canada in September of the same year to take up his position, and immediately began an overhaul of the entomology service in the Department of Agriculture. By 1915, Hewitt had expanded the entomology service from a small division of the experimental-farms branch into its own branch of the Department with four divisions, each headed by an entomologist. These divisions included systemic entomology, field-crop and garden insects, forest insects, and foreign-pest suppression. Hewitt had a talent for attracting the top entomologists of the time, including Reginald Charles Treherne and Norman Criddle. In 1916, Hewitt became consulting zoologist to the dominion as well as dominion entomologist.

=== Destructive Insect and Pest Act 1910 ===
Hewitt was instrumental in the initiation and implementation of the Destructive Insect and Pest Act 1910. Hewitt helped draft the act, and established twelve field laboratories, which sought to investigate insect problems and outbreaks regionally through the central federal government. Hewitt structured entomological issues as a central issue, which resulted in a vast number of insect-pest problems in the agricultural industry being solved.

=== Conservation biology ===
Hewitt was also very involved with the parks and forestry branches of the Department of the Interior, working closely with James Bernard Harkin on the subjects of bird sanctuaries, game preserves, and the general protection of wildlife. He helped to further negotiations in the 1916 Convention on the Protection of Migratory Birds in Canada and the United States, which provides regulations on the hunting of migratory game birds. Hewitt was also instrumental in the negotiation of the Northwest Game Act of 1917, which set regulations for the hunting of birds and animals in the north of Canada.

== Publications and scientific legacy ==
He published over 130 articles, monographs and reports on subjects ranging from conservation biology to the control of pest insects, compiled in the bibliography The Writings of the Late C. Gordon Hewitt After His Death by the entomological branch. He published several notable books, including The Conservation of Wild Life in Canada and Miscellaneous Papers on Insects. He was a fellow of the Entomological Society of London, a member of the Zoological Society of London, a fellow of the Royal Society for the Protection of Birds (RSPB), a fellow of the Entomological Society of America, president of the Entomological Society of Ontario, a fellow and treasurer of the Royal Society of Canada, president of the American Association of Economic Entomologists, and president of the Ottawa Field-Naturalists' Club. The C. Gordon Hewitt Award is awarded annually by the Entomological Society of Canada to persons under the age of 40 who have made an outstanding contribution in the field of entomology.

== Awards ==
Hewitt was awarded the gold medal of the RSPB in 1918 for his role in negotiating the Convention on the Protection of Migratory Birds of 1916 and for his role in negotiating the Northwest Game Act of 1917.

== Other activities ==
In addition to his entomological and conservation activities, Hewitt was president of the Ottawa Boys' Home, a councilor of the Ottawa Humane Society, and founding president of the Professional Institute of the Civil Service of Canada in 1920, which was renamed as the Professional Institute of the Public Service of Canada in 1950. Hewitt also had interests in home-gardening, literature, art, and music.

== Death ==
He contracted influenza after returning from the Federal Commission of Conservation in Montreal in February 1920. Several days later his influenza developed into pleural pneumonia, and he died at the age of 35 on February 29, 1920.

Professional and academic associations
Preceded by Frederick William Gamble	Secretary of the Manchester Literary and Philosophical Society; 1908–09	Succeeded by Henry George Albert Hickling
