= Henry Wentworth Monk =

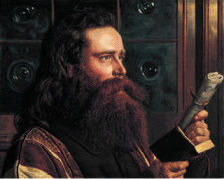
Portrait of Monk by William Holman Hunt

Henry Wentworth Monk (April 6, 1827 – August 24, 1896) was a Canadian Christian Zionist, mystic, Messianist, and millenarian. Some have credited him with predicting the formation of the United Nations and both World Wars, although these claims are of questionable scholarly merit.

== Biography ==
Monk was born on April 6, 1827, in March Township, Ontario a tiny and remote agricultural community along the Ottawa River. He showed an inclination towards reading and writing at a young age, and when he was seven years old, his father scraped together enough funds to send him to Christ's Hospital in England to be formally educated. Monk found life there unbearable, and would often take refuge in escapist fantasies as a means of coping with reality. After leaving Christ's Hospital, he studied divinity for a while in London, but returned to Canada in the 1840s.

It was in London that Monk was first exposed to Zionist thought. An early incident that had tremendous impact on his young mind was when he heard a speech by Lord Shaftesbury in 1839 or 1840. Shaftesbury, at the time, showed great interest in establishing a British protectorate in Palestine, and restoring the Jews to their "rightful home." Monk was apparently very moved by the speech and began reading whatever he could find on the subject of proto-Zionism and the Jewish diaspora. He would later come into contact with Edward Cazalet, a British Jew, who wanted to establish a Jewish state in Palestine as a safe haven for the oppressed Jews of the world. He was also profoundly affected by the Damascus affair of 1840, and wrote that the anti-Jewish violence perpetrated there deeply disturbed and saddened him.

Upon returning to Canada, he began corresponding with Christian proto-Zionists in the United States (mostly mystics and millenarians). A pivotal moment would come, when, in 1852, he decided he had discovered the "correct" interpretation of the Book of Revelation, after which he took a vow of poverty and left for Palestine as soon as his meager funds would allow. It was during this first stay in Palestine (which lasted just under two years) that he finished his interpretation of Revelation, formed the majority of the ideas he would stand by for the remainder of his life, and formed some friendships that would last that duration as well, most notably with the painter William Holman Hunt. Hunt painted his portrait, in which he is posed holding a copy of the New Testament and a recent issue of The Times newspaper, referring to his attempt to link Revelation to recent events. Behind him is an opaque glass window, referring to St. Paul's words that believers can only see the truth "through a glass, darkly". Hunt was also to help secure the funding of Monk's book on Revelation, thanks to a donation from John Ruskin.

For the next two decades, he split his time between Canada, the United States, Palestine, and Europe, trying to raise funds and lobbying for his cause. He proposed marriage to a woman from March Settlement named Anna Greene, but was rejected (prompting his second extended trip to Palestine). Eventually, in the 1870s, Monk settled in Ottawa, where he would become something of a public figure. He would lobby Parliament, stand for the House of Commons once (in 1887), produce most of his surviving written works, and launch the Palestine Restoration Fund (in 1875), which he would work on until his death. He died on August 24, 1896. His passing was mentioned in newspapers in Ottawa and Montreal, and he was eulogized as a philosopher, a moralist, and a crusader for justice.

== Thought and work ==
Monk's solution to the troubles of the world was derived from his interpretation of Revelation. He argued that Revelation predicted that a "great light" would "very . . . suddenly and unexpectedly overwhelm Christendom." He also cited Revelation's mention of Michael, the man-child. Michael would supposedly stand alone in the Kingdom of God for a time, only to be suddenly recognized by the world, which he would then rule with his "rod of iron." Monk was convinced that what Revelation was foretelling was the establishment of Palestine as a sort of global capital, which would serve two functions: firstly, a neutral ground where nations could settle their disputes via a permanent international tribunal, and secondly, a safe haven for the beleaguered Jews of the world. He believed that the "rod of iron" mentioned was the international tribunal, and the "great light" that would "overwhelm Christendom" was the return of the Jews to Palestine, and its establishment as a world capital. He fleshed out this idea with several very disparate philosophies.

=== Mystic, Messianic, and millenarian aspects ===
Monk's rooting in Christian mysticism came at an early age, at Christ's Hospital. As previously mentioned, he would often escape his harsh daily reality with fantasy. At the school, this type of behavior was supposedly not uncommon and, combined with the heavily religious curriculum, it produced many boys that harbored mystic Christian beliefs. Monk was definitely one of them, and it would influence him throughout his life, most prominently in his belief in a divine event that brings an end to global suffering: the coming of the Kingdom of God.

Aside from the Christian mysticist and millenarian elements, Monk's beliefs also bear resemblances to Jewish Messianism. He wrote that the Kingdom of God's coming would "immediately have the effect of arousing the millions of poverty-stricken Jews in Russia, and elsewhere, so that they would realize that the time has now arrived at last for the fulfillment of Divinely inspired prophecies in reference to the ultimate restoration of their own country." It would seem that the coming of the Great Redeemer, the Messiah, was what he had in mind.

=== Industrialist and modernist aspects ===
During his stay in London, Monk had been greatly impressed with the results of the Industrial Revolution, particularly in the fields of transportation and communication (he would later claim that the Bible had predicted the railroad and the telegraph). He viewed the machine as a liberating force, a means with which to end the poverty-stricken and backwards state of so many of the world's people (in particular, Russian Jewry). In The People and the Policy he wrote that it is not enough for Christians to pray for the coming of the Kingdom of God as they have always done: to realize the Kingdom, there must be prayer, and concrete steps of action on the part of all of Christendom. This emphasis on action, and by extension the human will, as a necessity of creating a better world is of considered to be of a modern nature.

Monk kept this modernism rooted in religion though. According to his calculations, he claimed, the Books Daniel and Revelation predicted the "Dark Ages" would last until around 1935. He believed this was an indication that the science of the day would be the shining light of the world, bringing about the "new dawn."

Monk also proposed some extremely idiosyncratic theories of planetary motion in several books written during the 1880s.

=== Political aspects ===
Despite believing that the Kingdom of God, as he envisioned it, was divinely preordained, Monk had few or no reservations about using political will and power to achieve his vision. For example, in 1872, a Board of Arbitration was convened in Switzerland to settle a dispute between the United States and Britain over losses of merchant ships during the American Civil War. During the deliberations, Monk wrote to U.S. President Ulysses S. Grant, urging that this board be made permanent and set up in Jerusalem.

Monk also thought that a powerful sponsor nation could unilaterally achieve his goals, and he placed his greatest hopes for such a sponsor nation in Great Britain. He believed that Anglophone nations were the most advanced in the world, and, as the leading nation of the leading group of nations, Great Britain was best suited to aid in the coming of the Kingdom of God on earth.

=== Moralist aspects ===
A good number of the pleas Monk made on behalf of world Jewry were on strictly moral and humanitarian grounds. In some cases, he merely pointed out the poverty so many European Jews lived in, the antisemitism they had to endure on a daily basis, and the general injustices visited upon them in their countries of residence. He came to the conclusion that the only way to alleviate their suffering was to return them to the Holy Land.

He also invoked moral responsibility, suggesting many times that in restoring the Jews to Palestine, the nations of Europe and North America would be atoning for all the injustices they had perpetrated on the Jewish people over the centuries.

Since Monk believed the international tribunal he envisioned would end war and conflict, the moralist element of such an idea hardly needs explanation. Similar to some of his Zionist arguments, he emphasized that the world's leading nations needed to take the responsibility of creating such a body, to save mankind from itself.

=== Notable achievements ===
Monk was never particularly successful in his life's work. He received scant attention from the politicians he lobbied, and had little impact on the growing Zionist movement in Europe and North America. His writings were not widely distributed, though some were translated into Hebrew and printed in the periodical Hamagid, based in Lyck, in what was then Prussia.

As early as the 1870s, Monk wrote of the need for a modern port in Haifa and large-scale land reclamation if Palestine were to be settled by large numbers of Jews. Both these assertions proved true, and were fulfilled in time.

The closest he came to any sort of practical success was on March 23, 1896, when one George Moffat, an MP from Dalhousie, New Brunswick, put forth a motion (in response to Monk's copious letter to him and his colleagues) in Parliament to discuss Canadian sponsorship of an international tribunal, convened in Jerusalem. Though it was the first time such a proposition had been discussed in a legislative body of the English-speaking world, the motion was sidelined, and Parliament adjourned soon afterward.

Also, Abraham Lincoln, not long after signing the Emancipation Proclamation, showed sympathy for Monk's pleas to end the suffering of Russian and Turkish Jews by "restoring" them to Palestine. Lincoln did not pursue the matter any further, and his assassination soon after made his interest inconsequential.

=== Psychological and emotional factors ===
It is important to consider Monk's psychological and emotional makeup when looking at his writings.

As previously mentioned, Monk often escaped the miserable life he led at Christ's Hospital through fantasy and daydreams. His second trip to Palestine may have been an adult episode of this, escaping the dejection he felt after Anna Greene declined his offer of marriage.

His stay at Christ's Hospital affected him in other ways too. He was taken from his home at a very young age and placed suddenly amidst the grime and squalor of 1830s and 1840s London. As an old man, he expressed a tremendous amount of resentment at this event in his young life. It seems to have influenced the development of his Zionist ideas, with London being the Babylon of his youth. This is most evident in a map he drew of his proposed plan for Jewish resettlement in Palestine: it closely resembles the original plan of March Settlement, perhaps the Zion to London's Babylon.

In adult life, Monk demonstrated a general lack of perspective, never really abandoned his rather blind idealism, and, at times, had ideas that bordered on the insane. He once described his interpretation of Revelation as the "most important work of the present time." He sometimes remarked that he himself might be the Michael mentioned in Revelation. Like the proponents of British Israelism, he believed that European peoples were the descendants of the Ten Lost Tribes of Israel.

=== Gravesite ===
Henry Wentworth Monk was buried in the Beechwood Cemetery in Ottawa, Ontario
