= National Memorial Ride =

Canadian motorcycle procession

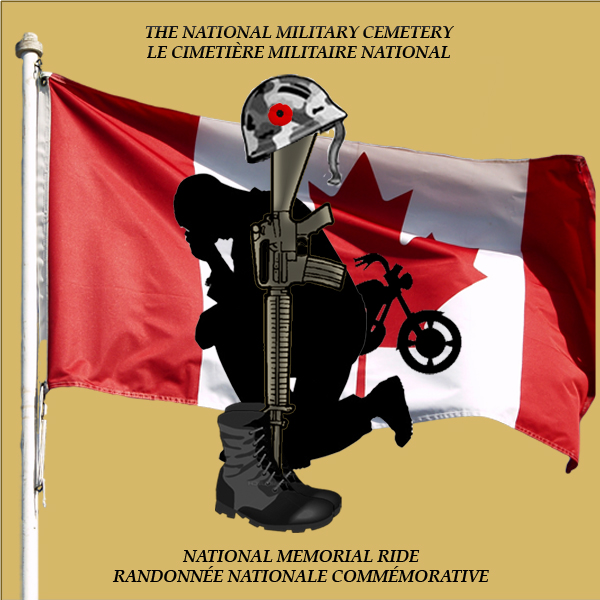
NMR Crest

The National Memorial Ride is a motorcycle procession by Canadian military veterans, families, friends and supporters on motorcycles to the newly created Canadian National Military Cemetery located at Beechwood Cemetery in Ottawa.

The National Memorial Ride Corporation (NMRC) was established to organize this event. It is a Canadian federally registered non-profit corporation staffed by volunteers.

The National Memorial Ride is planned and co-ordinated with the Department of National Defence, the Canadian Forces, Veterans Affairs Canada, The National Capital Commission, the City of Ottawa, Ottawa Police Services, the Legion and the Beechwood Cemetery Foundation.

== History ==
The first National Memorial Ride took place on June 6, 2009, at the National Military Cemetery located at the Beechwood Cemetery in Ottawa, Canada. The ride was attended by 328 registered motorcycle riders.

The second National Memorial Ride took place on June 5, 2010, at the National Military Cemetery and attended by 150 riders who braved the very wet weather to attend.

NMRC is not affiliated with any riding club, but members from many Canadian clubs have taken part in the ride.

The National Memorial Ride is conducted every year in conjunction with the anniversary of the Canadian D-Day landings on Juno Beach and elsewhere in Normandy, France, that took place on June 6, 1944.

== Sources ==
- Ottawa Citizen Life Section
- Ottawa Valley Ride Schedule
- Canadian Legion Magazine
- Bikers Database
- Industry Canada
