= William H. Hurdman =

Canadian entrepreneur

William H. Hurdman (October 9, 1818-February 20, 1901) was a Canadian entrepreneur and community leader.

The son of Charles Hurdman and Margaret Graham, he was born in Hull Township, Quebec in 1818. His family came from Ireland and his father had worked with Philemon Wright. In 1841, William Hurdman and his brothers started a lumber business under the name Hurdman Brothers. In 1873, he and his brother Robert moved to Gloucester Township, Ontario. He was reeve there from 1877 to 1879. The brothers built their own bridge, Hurdman's Bridge, across the Rideau River. The Hurdmans also established large farms in Gloucester, known for their livestock. In 1861, he married Sarah Sophia Smyth. The 1900 Hull–Ottawa fire wiped out the Hurdman Brothers operations in the LeBreton Flats area. Hurdman was buried in Beechwood Cemetery.

The family name is preserved in the Hurdman Bridge and Hurdman Transitway Station.
