= Roberta Elizabeth Odell Tilton =

American-born Canadian social reformer

Roberta Elizabeth Odell Tilton (September 20, 1837 – May 28, 1925) was an American-born Canadian social reformer. She helped found the National Council of Women of Canada.

The daughter of Daniel Ingalls Odell and Hannah Elizabeth Peavey, she was born Roberta Elizabeth Odell in Whiting, Maine.

In 1858, she married John Tilton. Originally a businessperson in Saint John, New Brunswick, he came to Ottawa to join the federal civil service. Born a Unitarian, Tilton became an Anglican like her husband.

In 1878, she was named first vice-president for the Ontario Woman's Christian Temperance Union (WCTU). Tilton became a founding member of the Ottawa WCTU in 1881; she also was president and chair of the Sunday school department. At the national level of the WCTU, she served as treasurer from 1892 to 1895, as superintendent of soldiers and volunteer camps/militia from 1895 to 1897 and as official auditor from 1898 to 1901.

Tilton was the main founder of the women's auxiliary to the Missionary Society of the Church of England in Canada, later known as the Anglican Church Women (ACW). She was secretary for the auxiliary in the diocese of Ontario. In 1886, she became corresponding secretary for the auxiliary at the provincial level and later served as provincial president. From 1902 to 1908, she was president of the dominion (national) auxiliary. In 1889, Tilton reorganized the Ottawa chapter of the Girls' Friendly Society. She was also founder and president of the Protestant Orphans' Home in Ottawa.

Tilton died in Ottawa at the age of 87 and was buried in Beechwood Cemetery. The Anglican Church of Canada commemorates her life every May 30.

The Church of the Ascension in Hamilton has a stained-glass window depicting Tilton.
