= Norman Elliot Rodger =

Canadian Military Officer

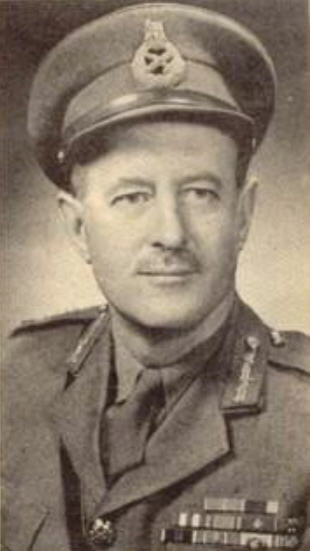
Undated photograph of Rodger

Major General Norman Elliot Rodger, CBE, CD (1907 – 15 September 2010) was a senior Canadian Army officer.

== Early life ==
Born in Amherst, Nova Scotia in 1907, Rodger was educated at the Royal Military College of Canada and McGill University. He was commissioned into the Royal Canadian Engineers in 1928.

== Military career ==
In 1942 he was appointed commander of the 10th Canadian Infantry Brigade.

From 1965 to 1970 he was Colonel Commandant of the Cadet Services of Canada.

== Later career ==
In retirement he served as the chairman of the Manitoba Liquor Commission from 1959 to 1969. Rodger passed away in September 2010.
