= Donald Alexander Macdonald (general) =

Canadian military officer (1845–1920)

Sir Donald Alexander Macdonald
- Born: October 31, 1845; Cornwall, Canada West
- Died: May 4, 1920 (aged 74); Ottawa, Ontario
- Military career
- Allegiance: Canada
- Branch: Canadian Militia
- Service years: 1863-1918
- Rank: Captain; Major-General
- Units: 2nd Cornwall Rifle Company; 59th Stormont & Glengarry Battalion
- Conflicts: Fenian Raids; Red River expedition First World War
- Awards: Imperial Service Order; Order of St Michael and St George; Canada General Service Medal

Sir Donald Alexander Macdonald CMG ISO (October 31, 1845 – May 4, 1920) was a Canadian Militia officer.

== Biography ==
Born in Cornwall, Canada West, the son of Alexander Eugene Macdonald and Grace Mackay Taylor, Macdonald was educated in the schools of Cornwall before joining the 2nd Cornwall Volunteer Militia Rifle Company as an ensign in 1863. He was promoted to lieutenant in 1865 and captain in 1866. After the 2nd Cornwall Rifle Company was incorporated into the newly formed 59th Stormont and Glengarry Battalion of Infantry, Macdonald was appointed as adjutant in 1869, promoted to major in 1871 and lieutenant-colonel in 1877.

Macdonald would see active service with the militia during the Fenian raids of 1866, the Red River expedition of 1870, and the North-West Rebellion of 1885.

In 1874, he joined the stores branch of the Department of Militia and Defence. In 1896, he was appointed chief superintendent of stores. He was promoted to colonel in 1900 and was made Director-General of Ordnance for Canada in 1903. In 1904, he was appointed Quartermaster-General of the Canadian Militia. He was promoted to brigadier-general in 1908 and major-general in 1912. He was responsible for equipping the first Canadian formations raised in World War I.

He retired in 1918 and was knighted by King George V. He died in Ottawa in 1920.
