= Cadet Services of Canada =

Former Canadian Army Corps

The Cadet Services of Canada was a corps of the Canadian Army that existed between 1924 and the unification of the Canadian Armed Forces in 1968, made up of instructors responsible for training youths of the Royal Canadian Army Cadets. It was preceded by the Corps of School Cadet Instructors (1909–1921) and succeeded by the Cadet Instructors Cadre (1968–present). Its officers were members of the Canadian Militia and most were also employed as teachers, whose influence helped to establish and standardize physical education programs in Canadian schools.
