= Otto Julius Klotz =

Canadian astronomer

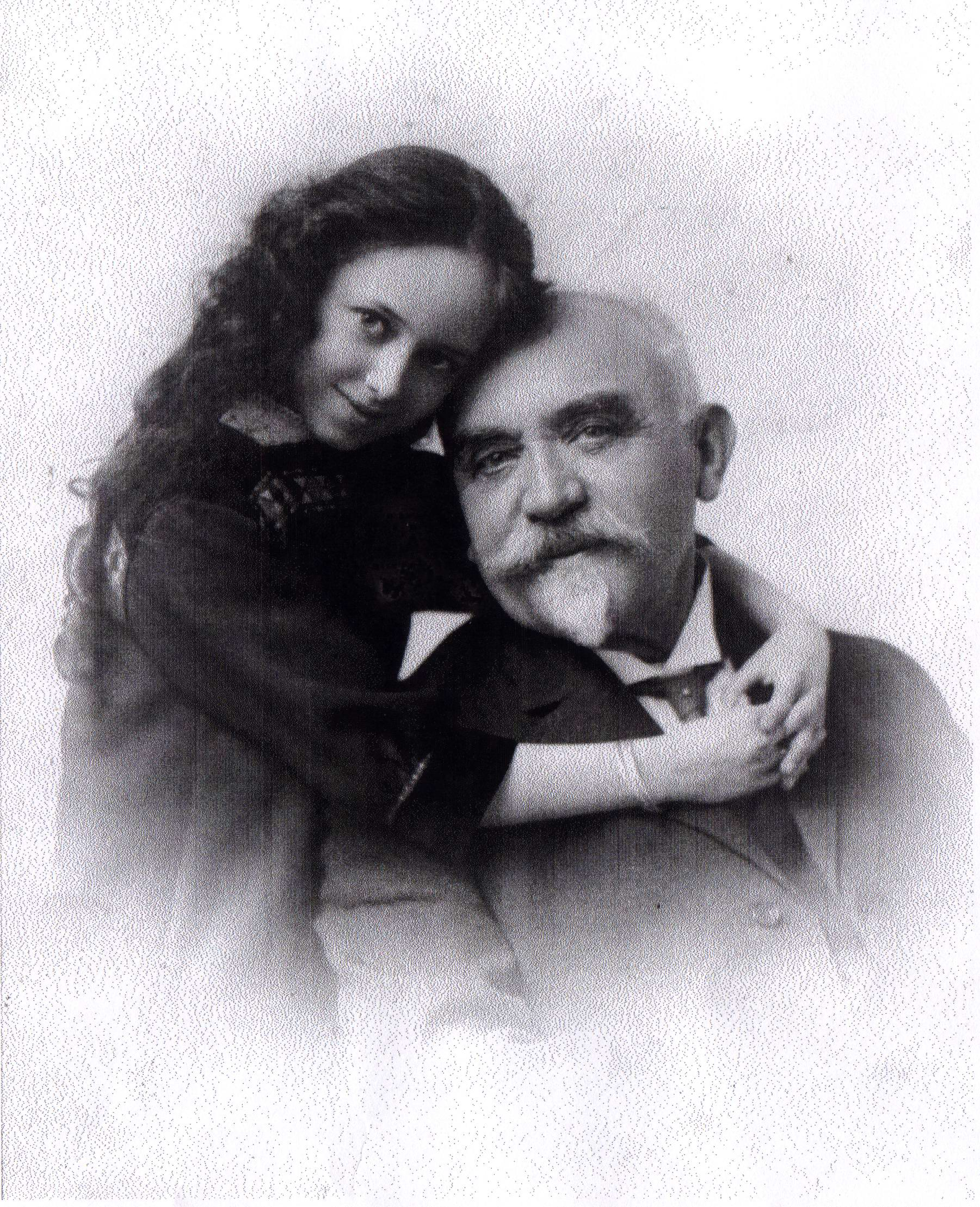
- Dr. Otto Julius Klotz with granddaughter
- Born: March 31, 1852; Preston, Canada West
- Died: December 28, 1923 (aged 71); Ottawa, Ontario
- Education: University of Michigan

Otto Julius Klotz OLS, DLS, DTS (March 31, 1852 – December 28, 1923) was a Canadian astronomer and Dominion Surveyor.

He was born in Preston (Cambridge), Canada West, the son of Otto Klotz and Elise (Elizabeth) Wilhelm. Klotz was educated at Galt Grammar School, and later headed to University of Toronto, and finished his degree in 1872 in Civil Engineering at the University of Michigan in Ann Arbor, Michigan.

At 14, Klotz received a foolscap diary in which he recorded every day of his life, except for two days when he crossed the date line. The personal and professional records are entered into the National Archives of Canada.

In 1885, Klotz was the first to be officially designated astronomer in the Dominion of Canada. He had been assigned chief of astronomical observations in British Columbia and the North West. He worked on the British Columbia Railway Belt Survey from 1885 to 1890 and was assigned the task of resolving the United States and Canada boundary dispute during the 1890s. Klotz also worked on the Alaska boundary survey in 1893–1894. While in London, England, 1898, he discovered a significant cache of Foreign Office correspondence, much of which pertained to the North American Boundary Commission, some of whose Royal Engineer members were photographers.

Klotz was appointed one (1908 as Assistant Chief Astronomer) of two employees of the Dominion Observatory, the nation's first astronomical observatory. In 1916, he was appointed Dominion Astronomer.

His other claims to fame include overseeing the All Red Cable Route connecting Australia and Canada in 1902, and he has been called the father of the Public Library in Ottawa University Club. He was also a member of the Astronomical Association of Mexico and the New Zealand Institute. During his work in British Columbia, he was the first to determine the heights of principal mountain peaks along the railway and named many of them.

He died in Ottawa on December 28, 1923.
