= Henri-Marc Ami =

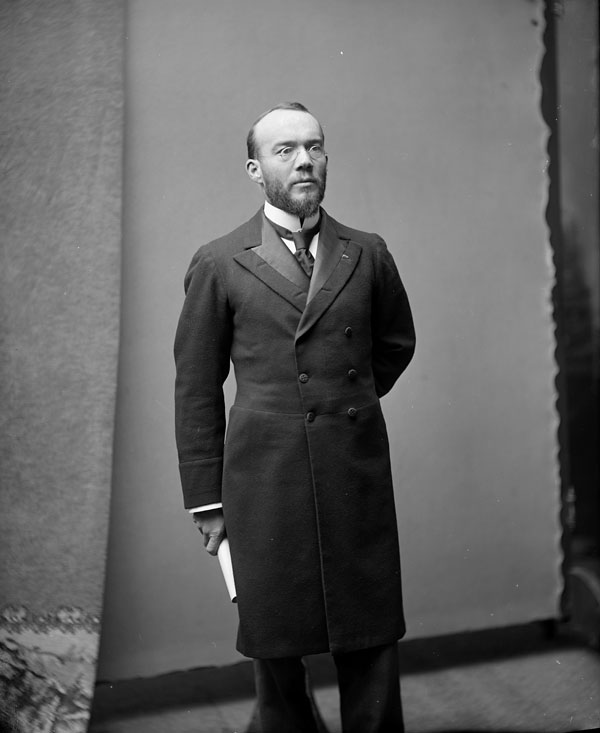
- Born: November 23, 1858; Belle-Rivière, Canada East
- Died: January 4, 1931 (aged 72); Menton, France
- Education: McGill University
- Awards: Bigsby Medal (1903)
- Scientific career
- Fields: Paleontology
- Workplaces: Geological Survey of Canada

Henri-Marc Ami (November 23, 1858 – January 4, 1931), also known as Henry Marc Ami, was a French Canadian archaeologist responsible for the initial excavation of Combe-Capelle from the years of 1926 until his death in 1931.

In 1899–1901 he was president of the Ottawa Field-Naturalists' Club. In 1900 he was elected to the Royal Society of Canada.

He received the 1903 Bigsby Medal from the Geological Society of London.

Dr. Ami is buried at Beechwood Cemetery.

== Early life ==
Born in 1858 in Belle-Rivière, the son of a Swiss pastor, he studied science at McGill University under Professor John William Dawson.
