= Harris Harding Bligh =

Canadian lawyer & librarian (1842–1918)

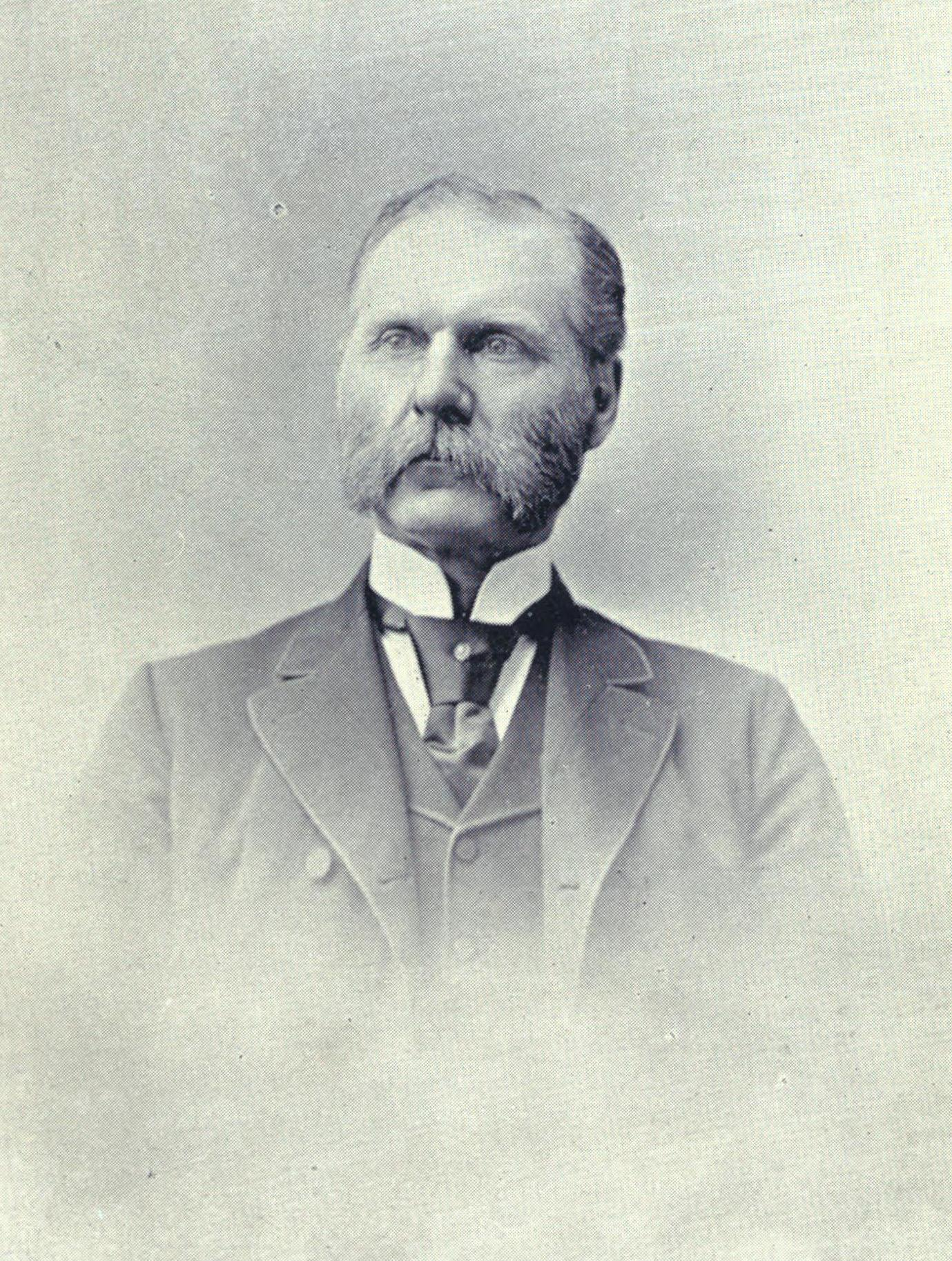
- Harris Harding Bligh circa 1895
- Born: April 14, 1842; Cornwallis Park
- Died: August 22, 1918 (aged 76); Ottawa
- Education: Acadia University (BA, MA, DCL)

Harris Harding Bligh (April 14, 1842 – August 22, 1918) was a Canadian lawyer and librarian.

== Biography ==
Harris Harding Bligh was born on April 14, 1842, in Cornwallis, Nova Scotia (now known as Cornwallis Park). He received a BA in 1864, an MA in 1867, and a doctorate of civil law in 1897, all from Acadia University. He was called to the bar of Nova Scotia in 1868 and practised law in Halifax and Antigonish County. He was created a queen's counsel in 1884.

Bligh became the librarian of the Supreme Court of Canada in March 1892. Before and during his appointment as the court's librarian, he prepared several reference works and indexes on federal and provincial statutes.

== Death ==
He died on August 22, 1918, in Ottawa.
