= James Fletcher (entomologist) =

Canadian entomologist (1852–1908)

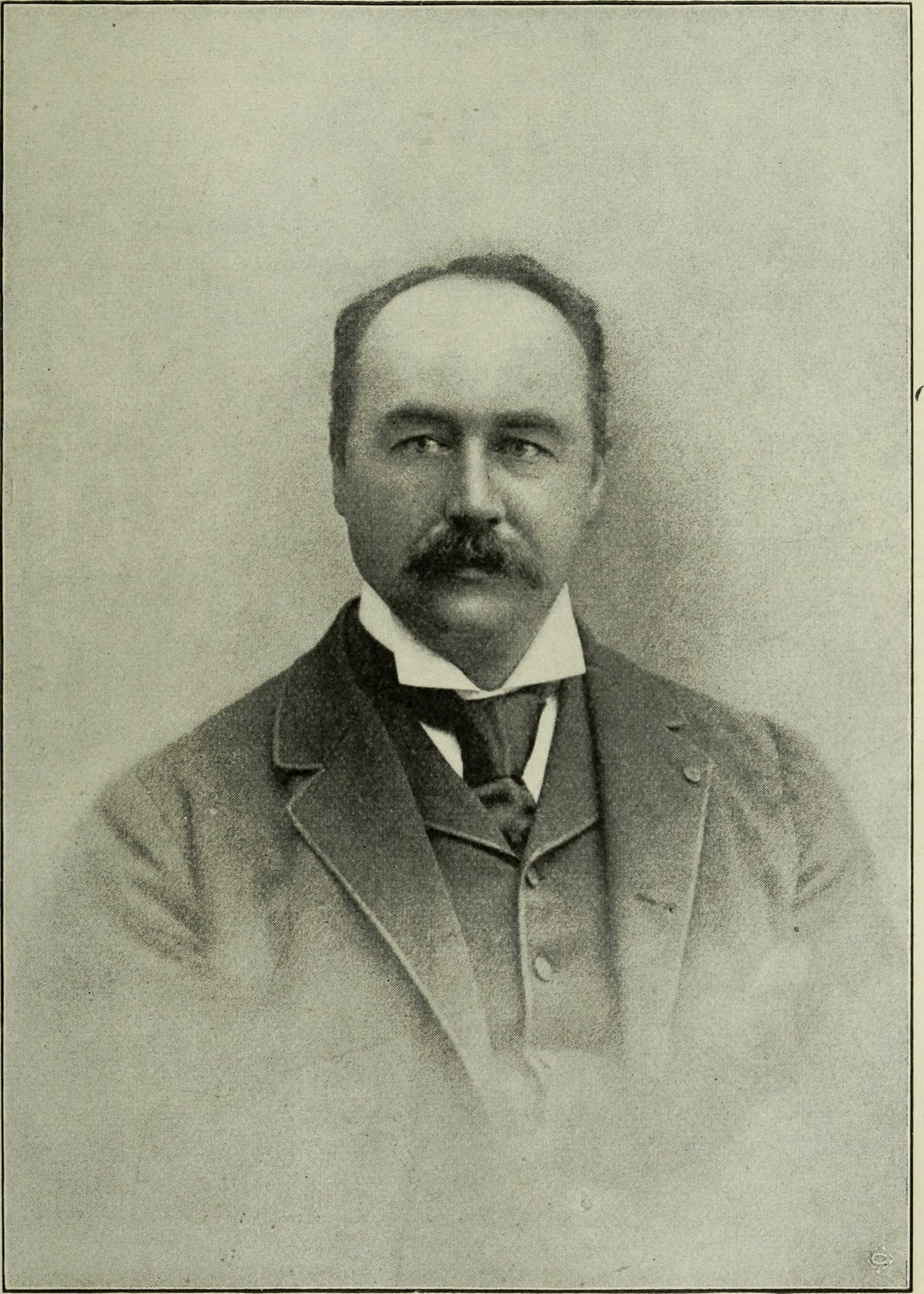
- Born: March 28, 1852; Ash, near Rochester, Kent, England
- Died: November 8, 1908 (aged 56); Montreal, Quebec, Canada
- Known for: "Father of Economic Entomology in Canada"
- Relatives: Collingwood Schreiber, father-in-law

James Fletcher (March 28, 1852–November 8, 1908) was a Canadian entomologist, botanist, and writer.

He was born near Rochester, Kent, England, in 1852. He began work as a clerk at the Bank of British North America in London, and was transferred to the Montreal branch in 1874 and the Ottawa branch in 1875. In 1876, he began work as an assistant in the Library of Parliament and discovered an interest in botany and entomology. He was one of the founding members of the Ottawa Field-Naturalists' Club and a president of the Ottawa Horticultural Society. He was elected to the Royal Society of Canada in 1885.

Fletcher established a national reporting system to help identify and control the spread of insects and weeds harmful to agriculture. In 1887, he became the first Dominion Entomologist and Botanist attached to the Central Experimental Farm. He helped set up measures to control the spread of plant diseases and harmful insects from both within and outside Canada. He was a founder of the American Association of Economic Entomologists, now the Entomological Society of America, and a fellow of the Linnean Society of London. Fletcher also initiated the Canadian National Collection of Insects, Arachnids, and Nematodes (CNC).

Besides his contributions to scientific journals and bulletins published by the Department of Agriculture and Agri-Food, he published with George H. Clark, The Farm Weeds of Canada in 1906.

He died in Montreal in 1908.

The Fletcher Wildlife Garden at the Central Experimental Farm, Ottawa, was named after him. On February 15, 2016, Fletcher was designated a National Historic Person. A federal historical marker reflecting that status was unveiled on November 9, 2017, at the Experimental Farm.

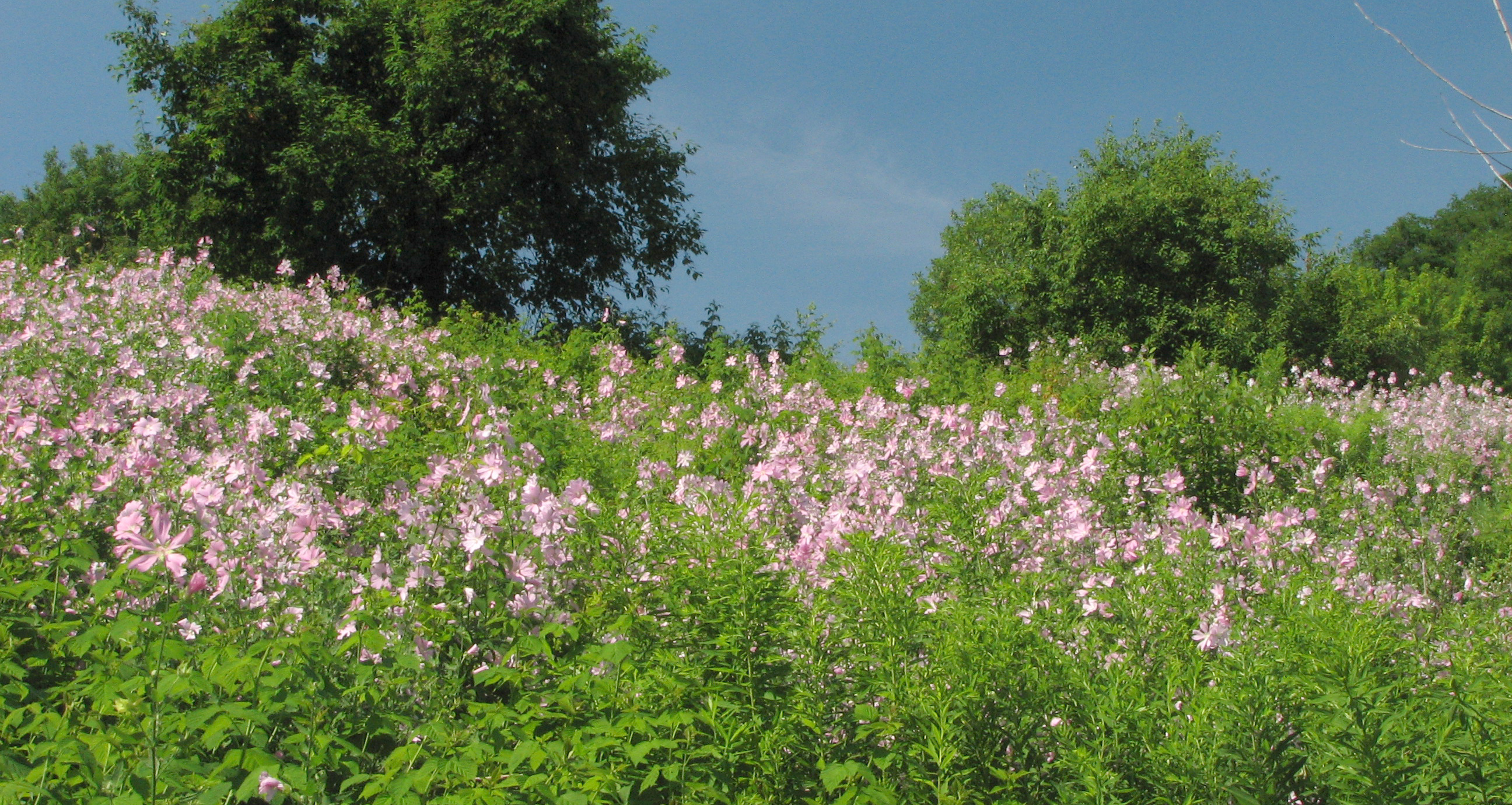
Fletcher Wildlife Garden at the Central Experimental Farm

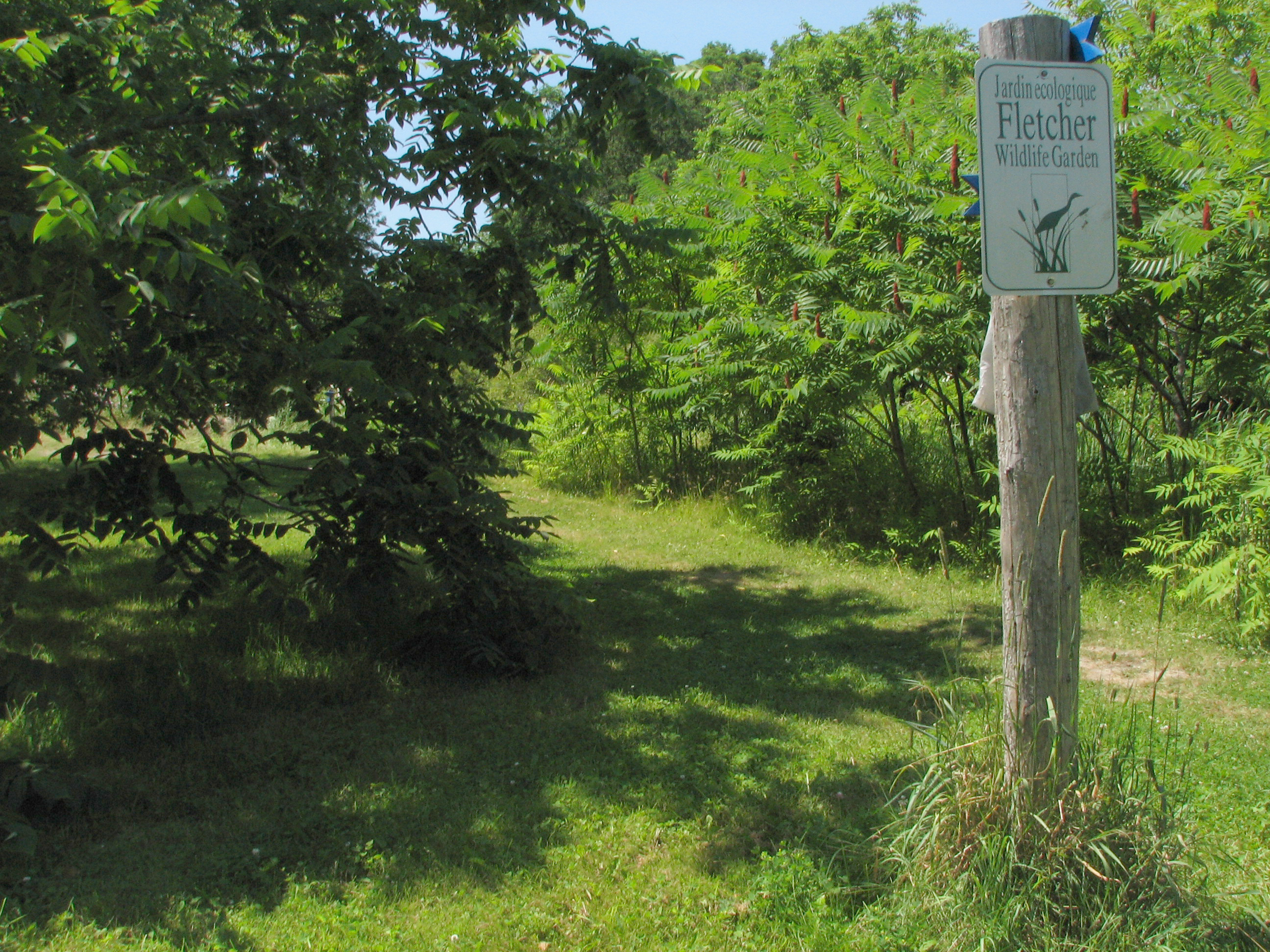
One of the many trails at Fletcher Wildlife Garden

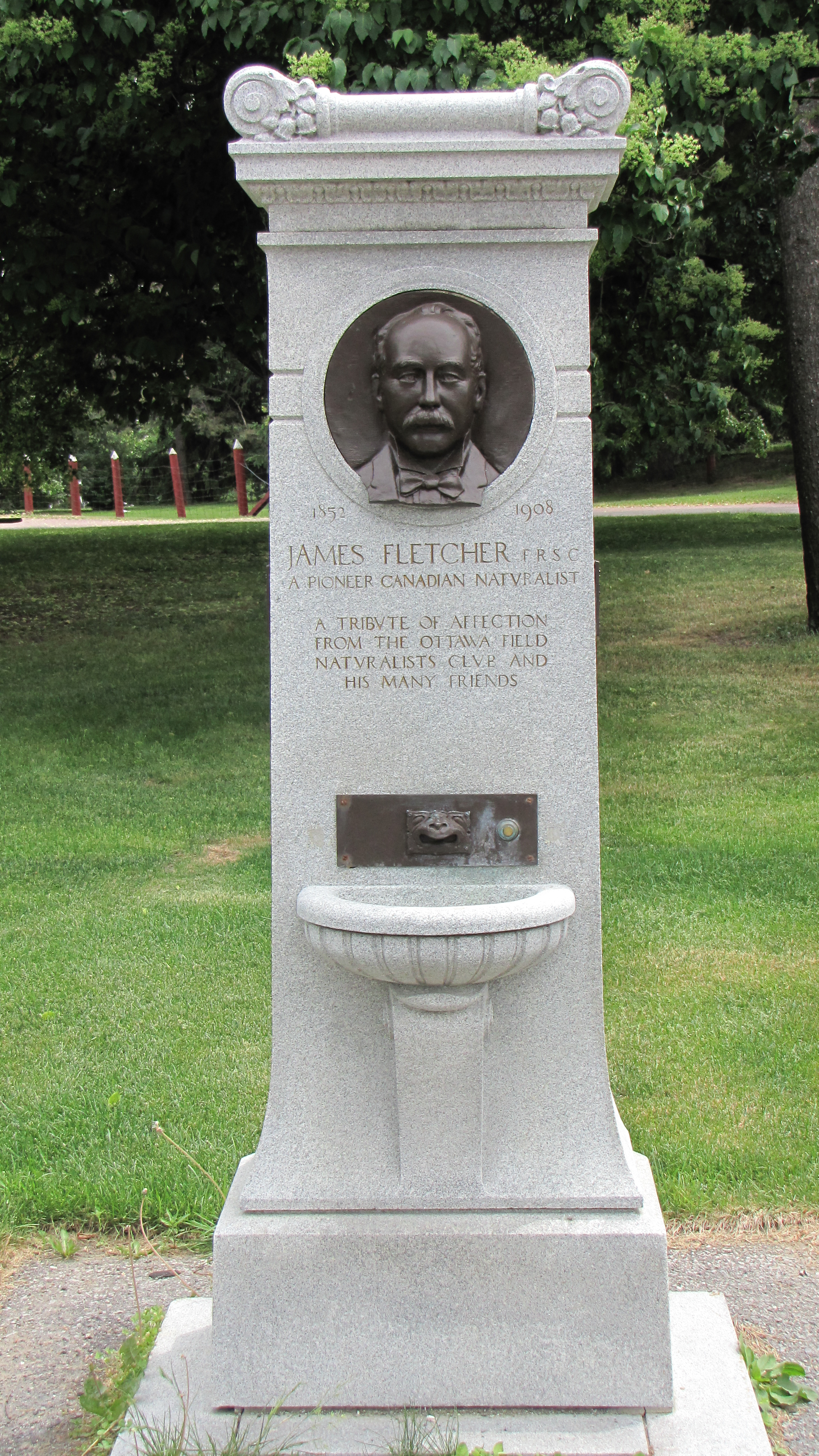
Monument to Fletcher at the Central Experimental Farm, Ottawa
