= 1892–93 Ottawa Hockey Club season =

Canadian ice hockey club season

1892–93 Ottawa Hockey Club
- League: 2nd AHAC
- 1892–93 record: 7–2–0
- Arena: Rideau Skating Rink

Team leaders
- Goals: Reginald Bradley (11)
- Goals against average: Albert Morel (2.8)

The 1892–93 Ottawa Hockey Club season was the club's eighth season of play. The Club played in the Amateur Hockey Association of Canada (AHAC) and the Ontario Hockey Association (OHA) leagues. Ottawa placed second in the AHAC championship, and won the OHA championship for the third year in a row after the Toronto Granites defaulted.

== OHA season ==
=== Results ===
Month	Day	Visitor	Score	Home	Score	
Mar.	1	Ottawa	6	Queen's University	4	OHA semi-final

The Toronto Granite Club, scheduled to play the final in Ottawa, defaulted, giving the championship to Ottawa. The Granites suggested putting together a team composed of players from all Toronto teams. However, the Granites failed to organize the team and the game did not take place.

== AHAC season ==
The AHAC adopted a new round-robin format for the regular season, with the league winner to be the inaugural winner of the Stanley Cup. Each team played two games against other opponents.

Ottawa lost to the Montreal Victorias in the opening game of the schedule on January 7. It would be the Victorias only win of the season and was the margin between Ottawa in second and the Montreal Hockey Club in first place. Ottawa split its series with Montreal, handing Montreal its only loss. After the season, Ottawa challenged Montreal to a final playoff, but this was refused.

=== Final standings ===
Team	Games Played	Wins	Losses	Ties	Goals For	Goals Against
Montreal Hockey Club	8	7	1	0	38	18
Ottawa Hockey Club	8	6	2	0	49	22
Montreal Crystals	8	3	5	0	25	34
Quebec Hockey Club	8	2	5	1	23	46
Montreal Victorias	8	1	6	1	20	35

=== Results ===
Month	Day	Visitor	Score	Home	Score
Jan.	7	Ottawa	3	Victorias	4
Jan.	14	Montreal	2	Ottawa	4
Jan.	21	Ottawa	5	Quebec	3
Jan.	28	Victorias	2	Ottawa	7
Feb.	3	Ottawa	4	Crystals	3
Feb.	11	Crystals	1	Ottawa	11
Feb.	18	Ottawa	1	Montreal	7
Mar.	17	Quebec	0	Ottawa	14

== Player statistics ==
=== Goaltending averages ===
Name	GP	GA	SO	Avg.
Albert Morel	8	22	1	2.8

=== Scoring leaders ===
Name	GP	G
Reginald Bradley	8	11
Chauncey Kirby	8	10
Jack Kerr	7	5
Halder Kirby	8	4
Weldy Young	8	3

== Roster ==
- Albert Morel (goal)
- Reginald Bradley
- William Dey
- Chauncy Kirby
- Halder Kirby
- Jack Kerr
- Bert Russel
- Weldy Young

Source: Coleman, pp. 9–10

== See also ==
- 1893 AHAC season

== References and notes ==
- Coleman, Charles L. (1966) [1964]. The Trail of the Stanley Cup, Vol. 1, 1893–1926 inc. pp. 8–12.
- Diamond, Dan, ed. (1992). The Official National Hockey League Stanley Cup centennial book. Toronto, Ontario: McClelland & Stewart. ISBN 0-7710-2803-2.
