= Ted Dey =

Canadian ice hockey player, arena builder, team owner

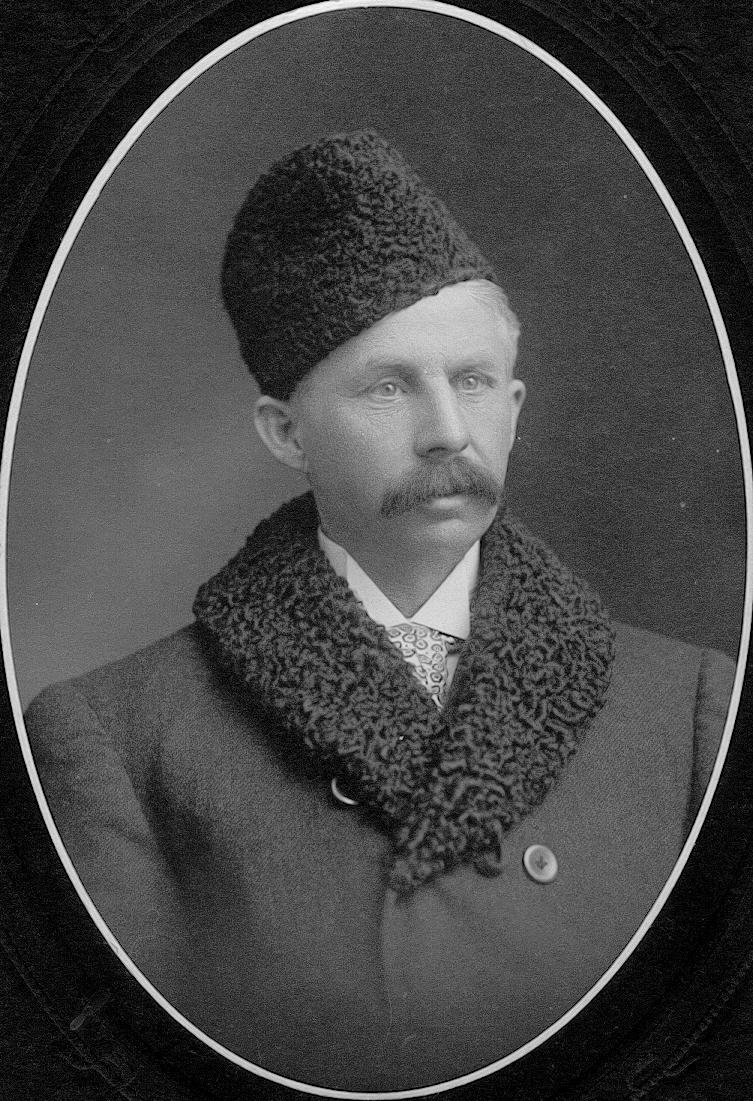
- Ted Dey, circa 1900
- Born: Edwin Peter Dey; April 21, 1864; Hull, Quebec, Canada
- Died: April 15, 1943 (aged 78); New Westminster, British Columbia, Canada
- Known for: Owner of the Ottawa Senators (1917-1923); Owner of Dey's Arenas
- Spouse: Edith Fairbanks Hunt
- Relatives: William Dey (brother); Edgar Dey (nephew)
Ice hockey career
- Played for: Ottawa Hockey Club (1887, 1889, 1890)

Edwin Peter Dey (April 21, 1864 – April 15, 1943) was a boat-builder, ice arena owner, and hockey team owner. He was an owner of the Ottawa Senators men's ice hockey club from 1917 until 1923. He and his brothers Frank Edgar Dey and William Ernest Dey built the various Dey's Arenas where the Senators played until 1922–23.

== Career ==
Born in Hull, Quebec, Ted Dey was one of three brothers and two sisters born to Joseph Dey and Annie Buckley. His father was a boat-builder in Ottawa. The brothers, William, Frank and Ted followed their father into the boat-building business. The business, now named "Dey Brothers", had a boat works on the Rideau Canal at Theodore Street (today's Laurier Avenue), where they built small boats and canoes for racing. The Dey brothers built their first indoor skating rink next to the boat works in 1884. The brothers would also become involved in the new sport of ice hockey at their rink. Ted Dey himself played games for the Ottawa Hockey Club (as the Senators were then known) in 1887, 1889 and 1890. The rink would also become home to its own team the 'Dey's Rink Pirates', founding members of the Ottawa City Hockey League in 1890.

The building of the Canada Atlantic Railway tracks along the Rideau Canal as far north as Rideau Street meant the demolition of the boat works in 1895. The brothers built a new boat works at Patterson Creek and Bank Street, and a new skating rink at Bay Street and Gladstone Avenue. The Dey's Skating Rink was the location of the first Stanley Cup win for the Ottawa Hockey Club. A third arena was built near the original skating rink, on the opposite bank of the Rideau Canal, and was known as The Arena, opening in 1907. The second skating rink was eventually demolished in 1920 after a fire, and the third rink in 1927 after its lease for the land expired.

In 1916, Dey first became involved in the management of the club, which had lost money during World War I. He imposed cost-cutting measures and fired the coach Alf Smith and gave the coaching duties to player Eddie Gerard. In 1917, he bought a share of the hockey club, along with Martin Rosenthal and Tommy Gorman, the total purchase price being $15,000. In 1919, he forced Rosenthal out and became majority owner. During his ownership, the Senators won three Stanley Cups, in 1920, 1921 and 1923. Dey could not bear to watch the games of the 1923 Final, and he paced in the dressing room while the game was played. After the 1923 championship, Dey sold his ownership of the club and retired. He went to live in New York City, and eventually moved in 1932 to New Westminster, British Columbia, where he later died.

His father died in 1904 and his mother in 1920. His brother William died in 1920. His older brother Frank survived him by a few months, dying in July 1943. His older sister Annie also died in 1943, his younger sister Beatrice in 1967. His wife Edith Fairbanks Hunt survived until 1956. They had no children.

Dey is credited with the use of the red light to indicate a goal, ending the practice of the goal judge waving a handkerchief. At The Arena in Ottawa during World War I, he and Stanley Lewis attached red flashlights at the ends of the rinks. This was later electrified with a switch for the goal judge to turn on red lamps.

== See also ==
- 1918–19 NHL season
- Ice hockey in Ottawa
- Ottawa Senators (original)
