= William James Topley =

Canadian photographer

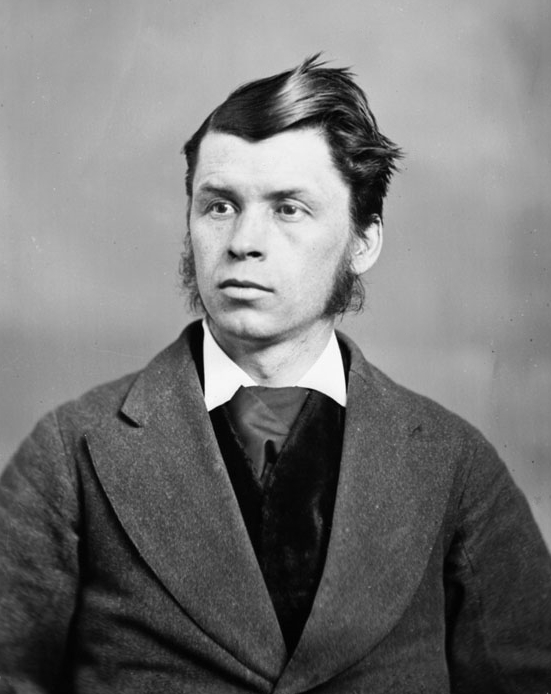
- Topley in 1875
- Born: 13 February 1845; Montreal, Canada East
- Died: 16 November 1930 (aged 85); Vancouver, British Columbia
- Occupation: Photographer
- Spouse: Helena de Courcy McDonagh (m. 1872; died 1927)

William James Topley (13 February 1845 – 16 November 1930) was a Canadian photographer based in Ottawa, Ontario. He was the best known of Ottawa’s nineteenth-century photographers and the most socially prominent one. Topley was noted for his portraiture of Canadian politicians and was a business partner of William Notman, having taken over Notman's Ottawa studio in 1872. A large number of photographs by Topley are now in the collection of Library and Archives Canada, including approximately 150,000 glass plates negatives and a set of 66 index albums covering the entire history of his Ottawa studios from 1868 until 1923.

== Early life ==
William James Topley was born in 1845 in Montreal, Canada East to John Topley, a saddler and harness maker, and Anna Delia Harrison. He was raised in Aylmer, a town outside of Ottawa in the modern-day province of Quebec. His first exposure to photography was from his mother, who had purchased a camera in Montreal in the late 1850s and brought it back with her to Aylmer. By 1863, Topley was working in Upper Canada as an itinerant photographer specializing in tintypes. That same year, he moved to Montreal with his family following the death of his father.

== Career ==
In 1864, Topley was employed as an apprentice to William Notman in Montreal. In 1868, the year following Canadian Confederation, Topley was placed in charge of a new portrait studio opened by Notman (his first outside of Montreal) on Wellington Street in Ottawa. The studio occupied a purpose-built structure across from the new Parliament buildings, and would specialize in portrait photography. Topley became the proprietor of this studio in 1872, which attracted over 2,300 sitters each year. By 1875, Topley had ended his business relationship with Notman and opened a studio of his own in Ottawa at the corner of Metcalfe Street and Queen Street. This studio was designed by the architect King McCord Arnoldi in the Italianate style and also served as a residence for Topley, however financial difficulties would see his studio moved to several locations throughout Ottawa until 1888 when it was permanently established at 132 Sparks Street.

An innovation that Topley learned from William Notman was the composite photograph. In 1876, Topley created one to commemorate the costume ball thrown by Governor General Lord Dufferin and his wife in February of that year—the first of several such balls thrown over the next two decades. By combining many separate photographs of individual participants within a single, large-scale frame, Topley captured the scale of the event along with the details of each person’s costume. He also produced similar images of attendees at skating carnivals, which were more accessible social events popular in the late 19th century.

By the late 1870s, Topley had become the official photographer to John Campbell, 9th Duke of Argyll during his time as Governor General of Canada. This position attracted the attention of many politicians and other prominent figures who visited his studio to have their portraits taken. Over the span of his career, Topley photographed every prime minister of Canada from John A. Macdonald to William Lyon Mackenzie King. Furthermore, his studio also attracted the wives and daughters of nobility, political and business figures including Princess Louise, Lady Aberdeen and Laura Borden. Topley admittedly catered to the well-to-do crowd, once writing that "If I can see beauty in the human face, and reproduce it, I can command three times the reward for my work than he who simply shoots a plate at his patron. True, in a small city, such a course limits trade, but one-half of the business with three times the prices is much better for mind and body and pocketbook."

Nonetheless, Topley is also known for his photographs of immigrants arriving at Quebec City commissioned by the Department of the Interior in the early twentieth century. Another atypical series for him was his 1895 series featuring female prisoners in Ottawa. His studio also produced and sold landscape photos from across the country. In 1907, Topley's son William DeCourcy took over his studio. By this time, business had declined significantly and the studio was closed in July 1926.

Throughout his long career as a photographer in Ottawa, Topley was involved with a variety of evangelical and philanthropic organizations. He was a member of the Ottawa Bible Society and served as president of the Young Men’s Christian Association in Ottawa in 1871 and 1881. Topley was also a founding member of the Camera Club of Ottawa (established in 1894), a Sunday school superintendent at the Dominion Methodist Church in Ottawa, and was involved in the Metropolitan Society for the Prevention of Cruelty to Animals. Following the closure of his studio, Topley spent much time with his daughter Helena in Edmonton. He died at Vancouver in 1930. The village of Topley in British Columbia is named in his honour.

== Gallery ==
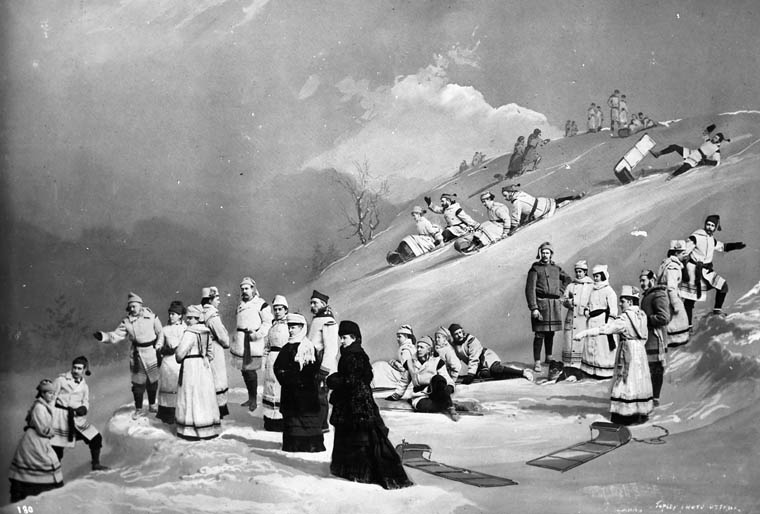
"The Toboggan Party" from the personal album of Lady Dufferin, c.1872-75

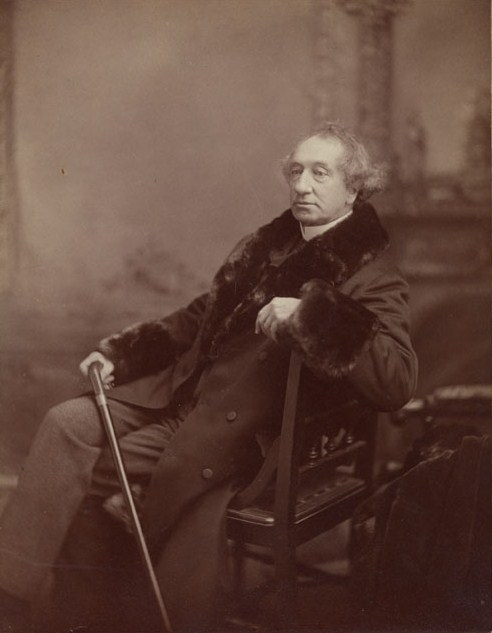
Sir John Alexander Macdonald, first prime minister of Canada taken in 1883

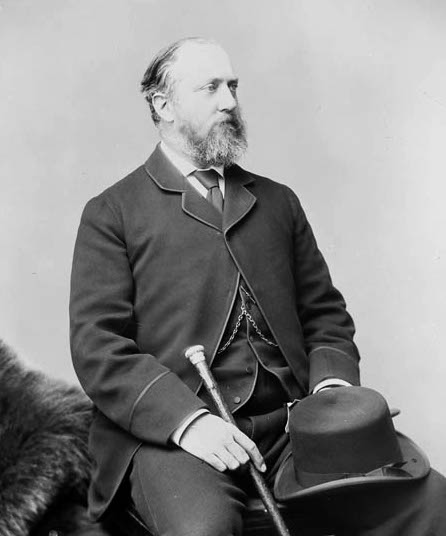
Lord Stanley of Preston, sixth Governor General of Canada photographed in 1889

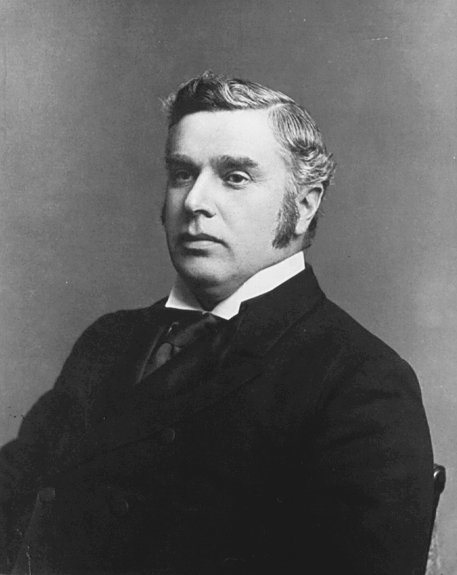
Sir John Sparrow David Thompson, fourth prime minister of Canada taken in 1891

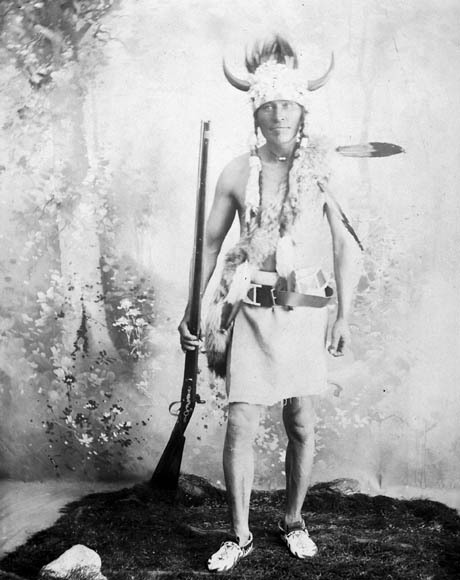
Cree war chief Fine-Day photographed by Topley in 1896

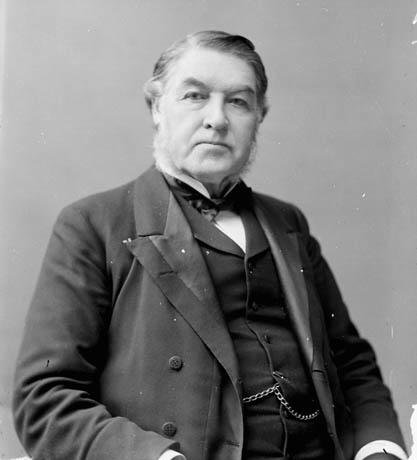
Sir Charles Tupper, sixth prime minister of Canada taken in 1896

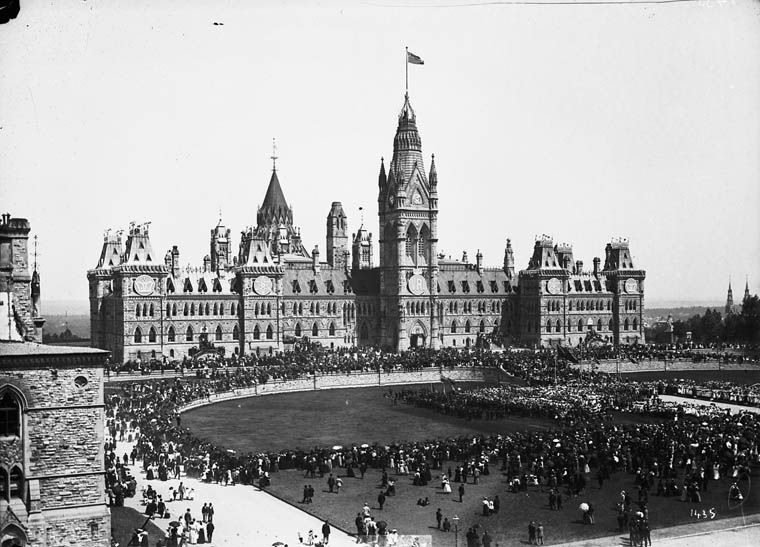
Queen Victoria's Diamond Jubilee on Parliament Hill, 1897

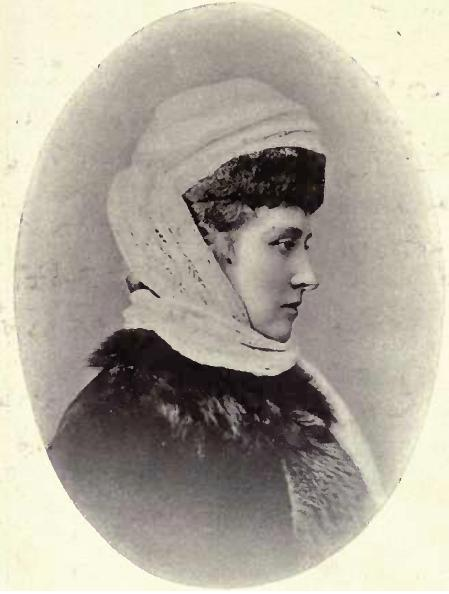
Princess Louise, Duchess of Argyll photographed in 1903

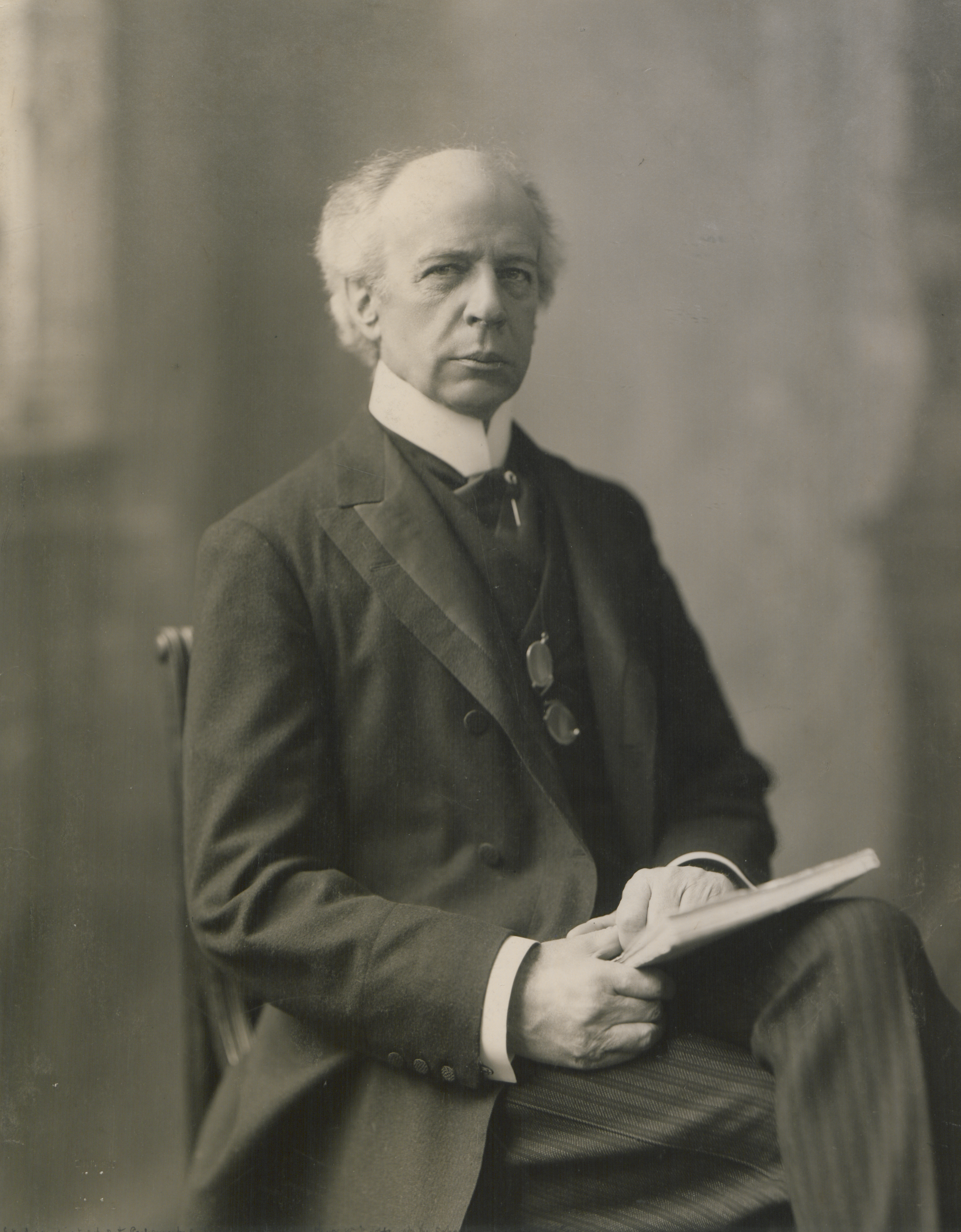
Sir Wilfrid Laurier, seventh prime minister of Canada taken in 1906

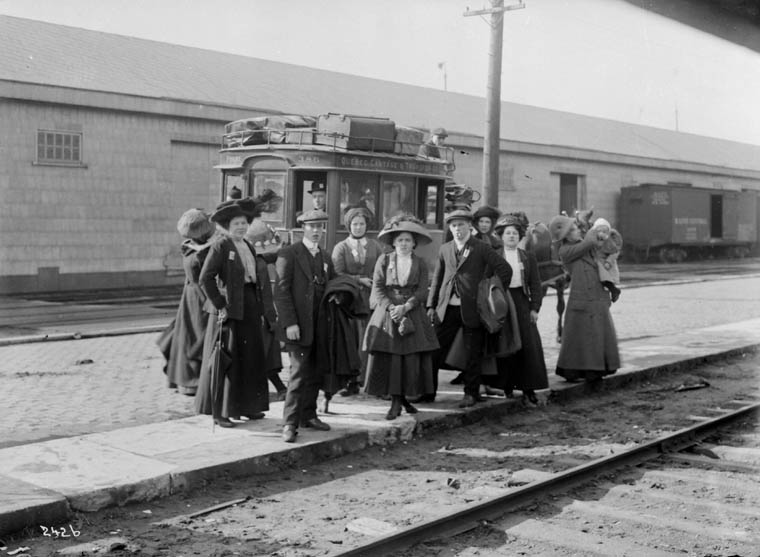
Photograph of immigrants arriving at Quebec done for the Department of the Interior, 1910

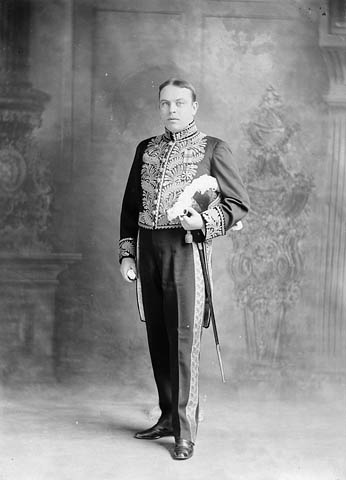
William Lyon Mackenzie King, wearing court dress as Minister of Labour, taken in 1910

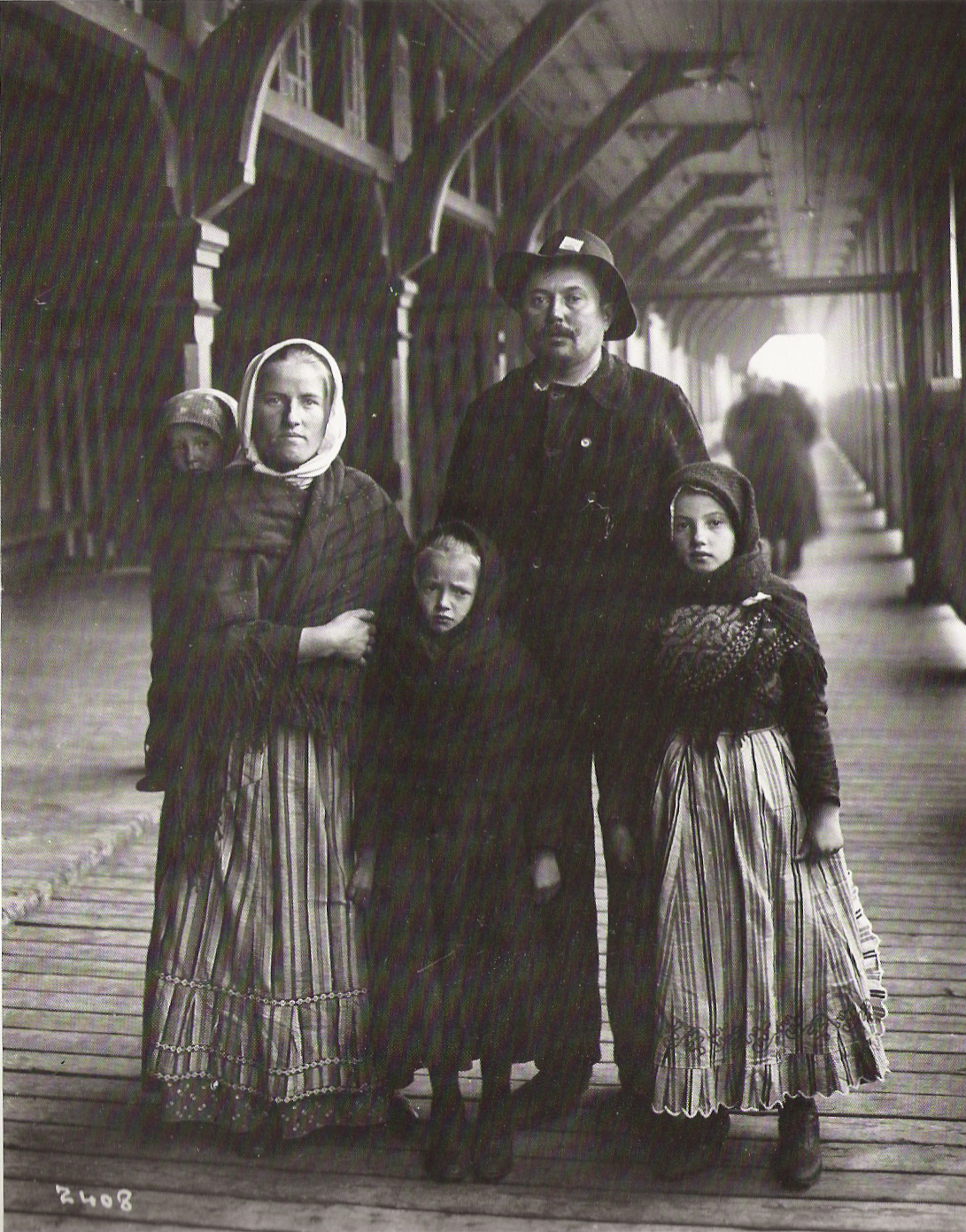
German immigrants, Quebec City, Canada, 1911

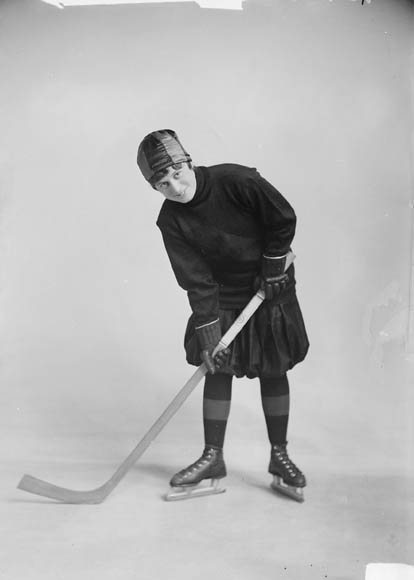
Female ice hockey player Eva Ault photographed in 1917
