= 1894–95 Ottawa Hockey Club season =

Canadian ice hockey club season

1894–95 Ottawa Hockey Club
- League: 3rd AHAC
- 1894–95 record: 4–4–0

Team information
- Captain: Weldy Young
- Arena: Rideau Skating Rink

Team leaders
- Goals: Bert Russel (10)
- Goals against average: Fred Chittick

The 1895 Ottawa Hockey Club season was the club's tenth season of play. After qualifying for the final championship match in 1894, the club placed second in the league.

== Team business ==
Former player and Stanley Cup trustee P. D. Ross was elected president of the Hockey Club for the season.

== Pre-season ==
Ottawa played four pre-season games, on December 27, 1894, at home against Montreal HC, winning 5–1. Chauncy Kirby would play goal for Ottawa. The clubs played a rematch exhibition in Montreal on December 30. In this game, spirits were high in the Victoria Skating Rink as the crowd rushed onto the ice after Ottawa tied the game 2–2. Captain Young would order Ottawa off the ice and the game did not resume.

A team composed of American collegiate players visited Ottawa for a two-game series at the start of January. The first game, on January 2, 1895, was played under American rules (with a ball, and the positions titled goal, quarterback and three forwards) and was won by the Americans 5–3. The second game was played under Canadian rules and was won by Ottawa 15–1.

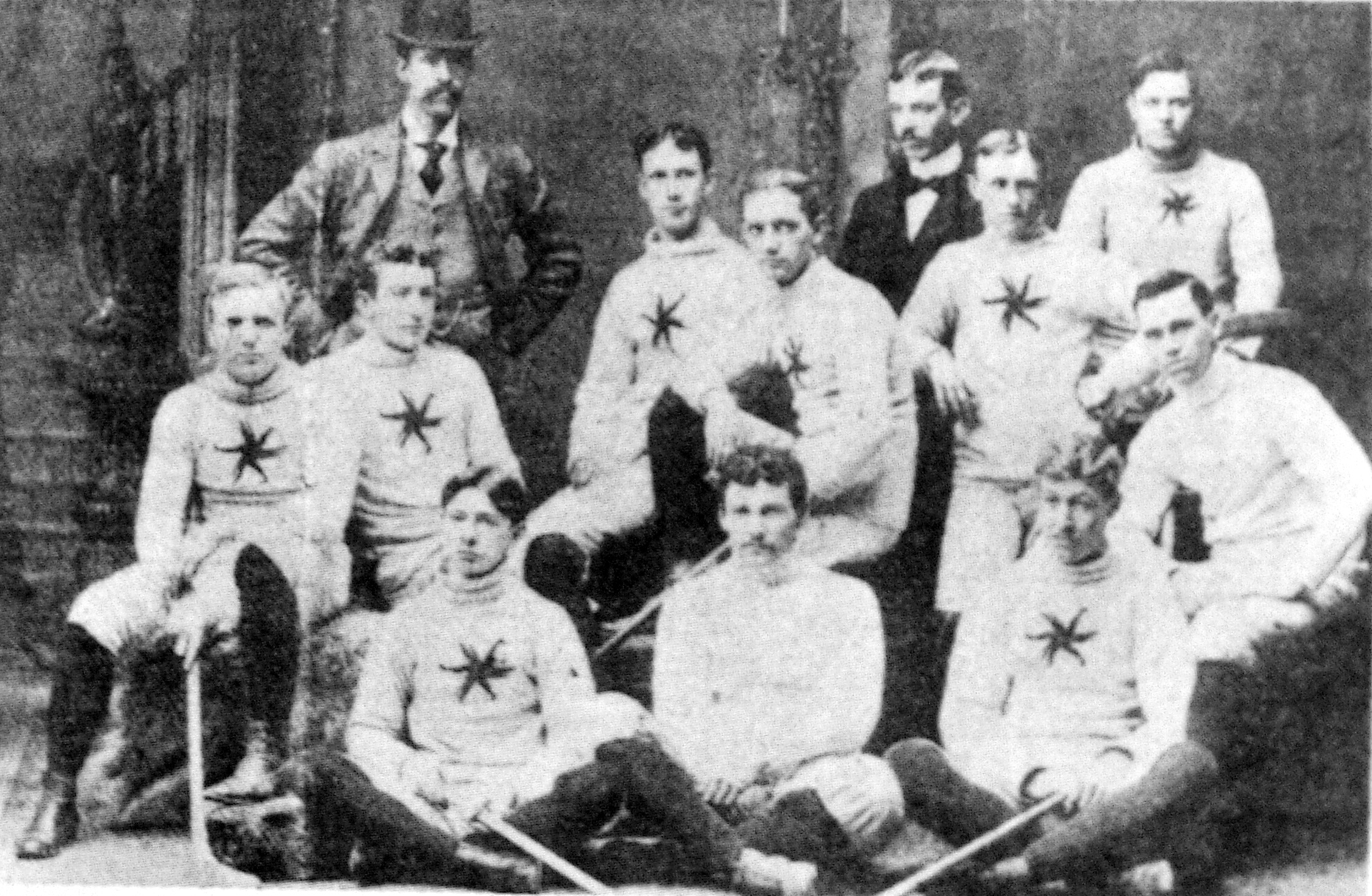
1895 team photo. Still using the triskellion insignia. Standing: P. D. Ross, G. P. Murphy, Chauncey Kirby, Don Watters. Seated: Jim Smellie, Alf Smith, Harvey Pulford, Weldy Young, Joe McDougal. Bottom row: Harry Westwick, Fred Chittick, H. Russel

== Season ==
Ottawa entered the season without a regular goalie as a replacement for Albert Morel was needed. New player Fred Chittick would win the job, but the club would not keep pace with Montreal Victorias and finished second.

=== Highlights ===
A game involving Quebec was noteworthy, on February 23 against Ottawa, won by Ottawa 3–2. The game, played at Quebec, was very rough and the crowd became hostile towards the visitors. At the end of the match, the crowd pursued referee Hamilton and Umpire Findlay as they left the arena, and dragged them back to force them to declare the game a draw. Police were called to break up the demonstration. Subsequent to the match, the AHAC decided to suspend the Quebec hockey club for the rest of the season.

=== Final Standing ===
Team	Games Played	Wins	Losses	Ties	Goals For	Goals Against
Montreal Victorias	8	6	2	0	35	20
Montreal Hockey Club	8	4	4	0	33	22
Ottawa	8	4	4	0	25	24
Montreal Crystals	8	3	4	0	21	39
Quebec††	8	0	8	0	18	27

†† Quebec team suspended after attack on officials after game of February 23.

=== Results ===
Month	Day	Visitor	Score	Home	Score
Jan.	5	Crystals	1	Ottawa	9
Jan.	12	Ottawa	1	Victorias	5
Jan.	19	Ottawa	2	Montreal	3
Jan.	26	Quebec	0	Ottawa	1
Feb.	16	Montreal	3	Ottawa	4 12' overtime
Feb.	23	Ottawa	3	Quebec	2
Mar.	2	Victorias	3	Ottawa	2
Mar.	6	Ottawa	3	Crystals	7

=== Goaltending averages ===
Name	Club	GP	GA	SO	Avg.
Chittick, Fred	Ottawa	6	18	1	3.0
Westwick, Harry	Ottawa	2	6		3.0

=== Leading scorers ===
Name	Club	GP	G
Russel, Bert	Ottawa	8	10
Kirby, Chauncey	Ottawa	7	5
Smith, Alf	Ottawa	8	5

=== Roster ===
- Fred Chittick
- Chauncey Kirby
- Joe McDougal
- Harvey Pulford
- Bert Russel
- James Smellie
- Alf Smith
- Dan Waters
- Harry Westwick
- Weldy Young

== See also ==
- 1895 AHAC season
