= Ice hockey in Ottawa =

Overview of ice hockey practiced in Ottawa

In Ottawa, Canada, ice hockey clubs date back to the first decade of recorded organized ice hockey play. The men's senior-level Ottawa Hockey Club is known to have played in a Canadian championship in 1884. Today, Ottawa hockey clubs are represented in all age brackets, in both men's and women's, in amateur and professional.

== Early hockey ==
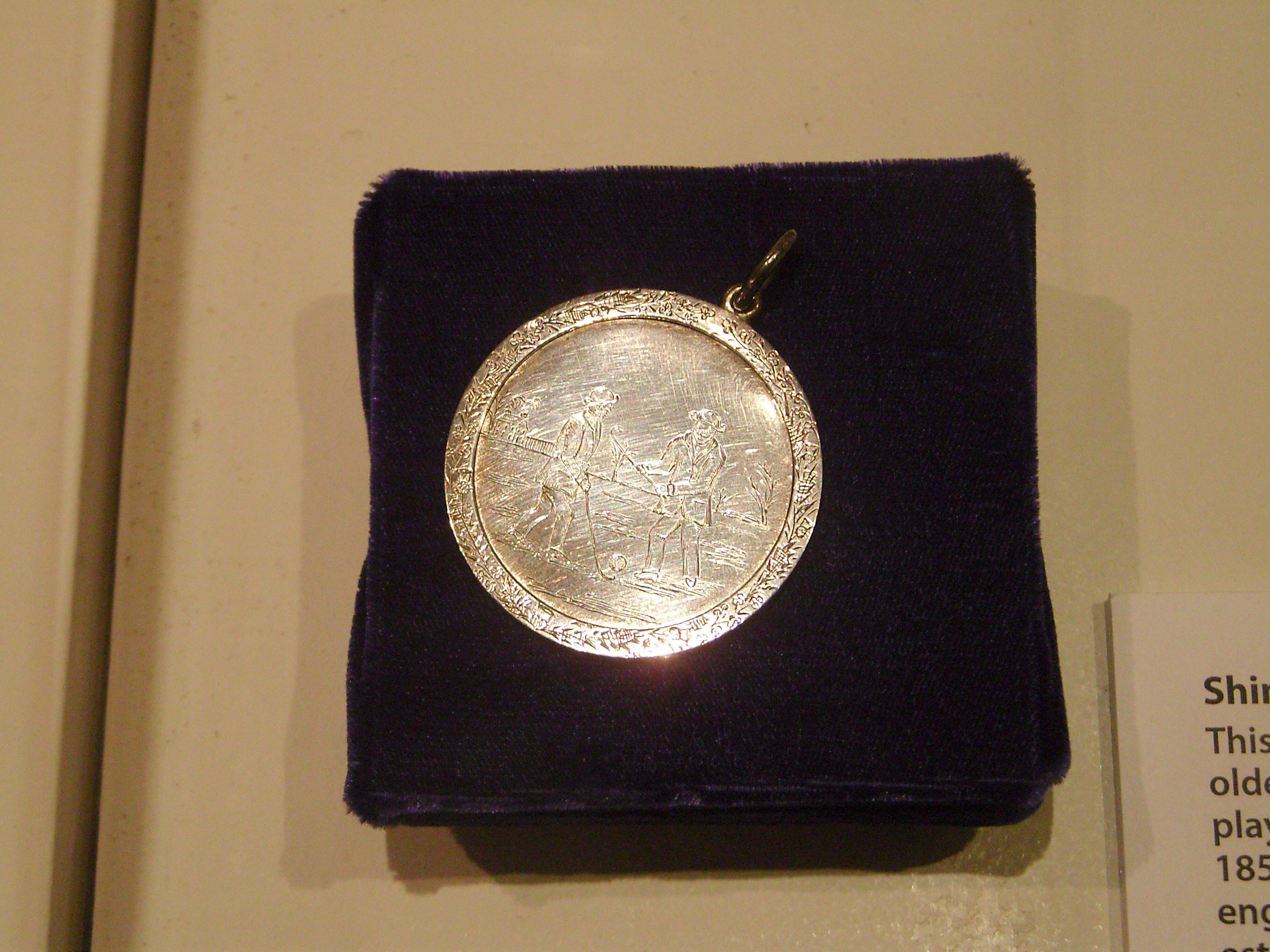
An 1850s shinny tournament medal.

Precursor games of ice hockey are known to have been played in Ottawa. The 1850s medal pictured was presented to a shinny tournament champion. The illustration on the medal depicts two players. The sticks are field hockey sticks and the game was played with a ball. The medal is in the collection of the City of Ottawa archives.

== Early amateur era ==
James Creighton, the organizer of the first indoor ice hockey game in 1875 moved to Ottawa and helped develop the game. He worked as a law clerk for the Senate chamber of the Parliament of Canada. Another important figure in the development of the game in Ottawa was P. D. Ross, the publisher of the Ottawa Journal, and later trustee of the Stanley Cup.

The Ottawa Hockey Club, formed in 1883. The club played its first competitive matches in the Montreal Winter Carnival tournament of 1884, and helped form the Amateur Hockey Association of Canada in 1886. The team went into hiatus from 1887 until 1889, when the new Rideau Skating Rink opened, and P. D. Ross helped to rebuild the hockey club. They would re-enter play in 1890, in the Ontario Hockey Association (OHA). Ottawa HC were the first winners in the OHA, from 1890 to 1893. They left the OHA after that season in a dispute over the location of playoffs for the Cosby Cup. This schism lead to today's organization of hockey in Ontario where the ODMHA is responsible for eastern Ontario rather than the OHA.

When Lord Stanley was named Governor-General to Canada, he and his sons and daughter developed a keen interest in hockey, and games were played on a natural rink at Rideau Hall. His sons played on a team called the "Rideau Hall Rebels".

On March 8, 1889, the first recorded organized women's ice hockey match took place at Rideau Skating Rink.

In 1892, at an end-of-season banquet at the Russell House honouring the OHA champion Ottawa Hockey Club, Lord Stanley announced his donation of the "Challenge Cup", later to be known simply as the Stanley Cup.

In 1894, Ottawa HC played in the first Stanley Cup playoffs against the Montreal Victorias, played in Montreal.

In 1897 Ottawa HC rival Ottawa Capitals would play in Stanley Cup challenge against Montreal Victorias.

In 1901, the Ottawa Hockey Club won its first Canadian championship in the Canadian Amateur Hockey League, but did not challenge for the Stanley Cup.

In 1902, the Ottawa Hockey Club first used the nickname 'Senators'.

In 1903, the Ottawa Senators won their first Stanley Cup at the Dey's Arena. The individual players each received a silver nugget, and the team picked up the nickname of the "Silver Seven".

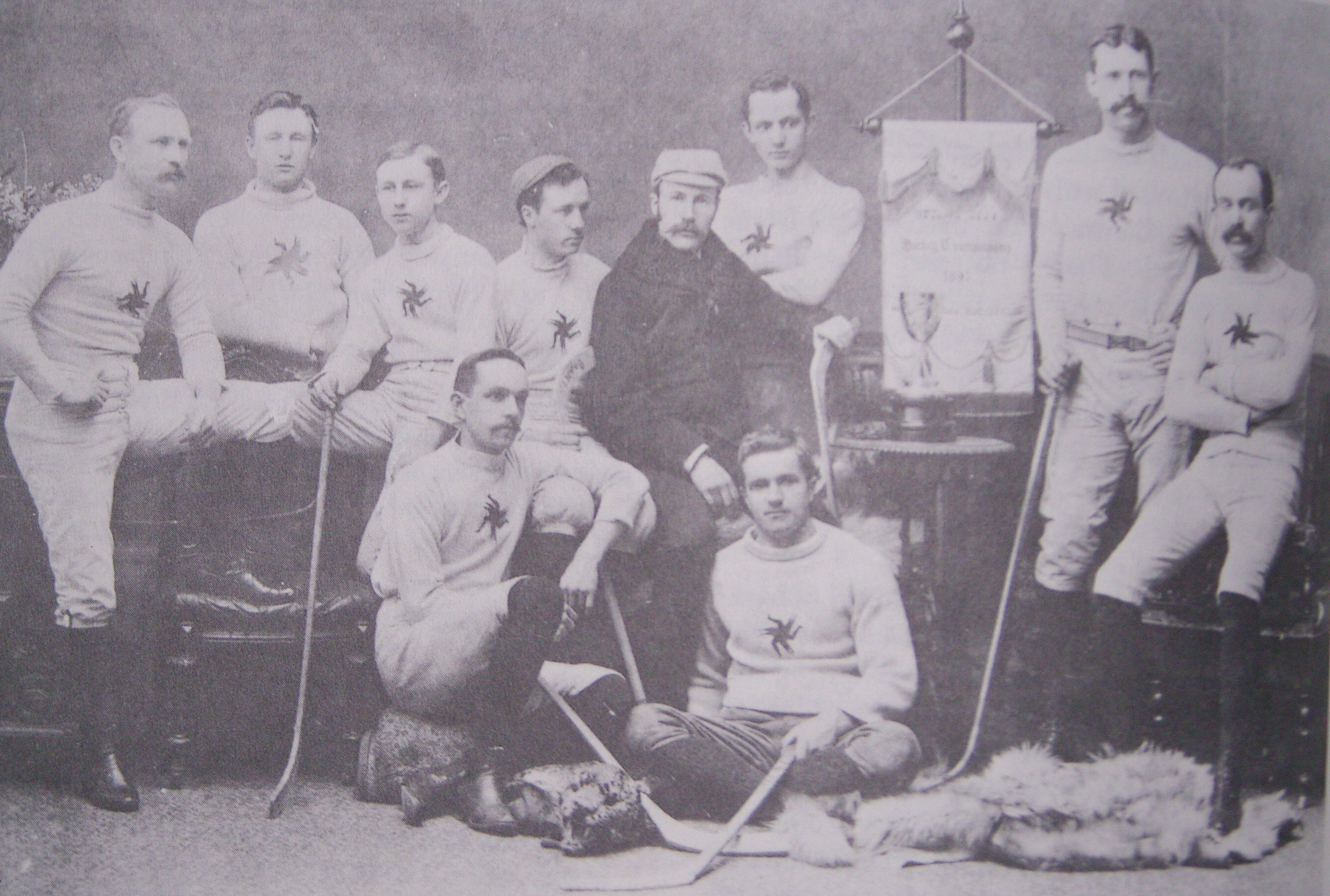
Ottawa Hockey Club, 1891 Ottawa City and OHA champions

From 1903 to 1906, the Silver Seven would defeat all challengers in Stanley Cup play, losing in March 1906 to rival Montreal Wanderers in the 1906 ECAHA championship.

In 1908, the Ottawa Victorias would challenge the Montreal Wanderers for the Stanley Cup. Losing a two-game playoff, they were the last amateur team from Ottawa to challenge for the Cup.

In 1909, the Ottawa Cliffsides were the first champions of the Allan Cup, by virtue of winning the Inter-provincial Hockey League. The Allan Cup was a new trophy given to the senior amateur champions of Canada, after the Stanley Cup was to be only contested by professional teams.

=== Ottawa City Hockey League ===
The Ottawa City Hockey League was one of the first developmental competitive leagues. Teams played in junior and senior age groups. The league was formed in 1890 by the Ottawa Hockey Club, with senior teams only in the first season. Ottawa HC continued to operate a team in the OCHL, called the 'Seconds' after concentrating its first team effort in the AHAC. The league operated until 1945 and its teams dispersed between Quebec and Ottawa leagues.

== Early professional era ==
The Ottawa HC/Senators helped found or were inaugural season members of several professional leagues in Canada:

- Eastern Canada Hockey Association (1909)
- Canadian Hockey Association (1910)
- National Hockey Association (1910)
- National Hockey League (1917)

The Ottawa HC also played in the Federal Amateur Hockey League, which became professional in 1908. Ottawa HC played in the league before it became professional, but a second Senators professional team composed of former Silver Seven players, played in the then Federal Hockey League along with future NHA founders, the Renfrew Creamery Kings during the 1909 season.

In 1934, the Ottawa Hockey Association, the Senators NHL club owners, would split its hockey operations. The NHL club would relocate to St. Louis, Missouri and become the Eagles. The Eagles would play one season in St. Louis before the NHL bought out the Association and disperse the players. Separately, the Ottawa Senators were continued as a senior amateur team, the 'Senior Senators', taking the NHL club's place in the Ottawa Auditorium, using the same striped sweaters and 'O' logo, but play senior amateur clubs in Quebec, including those the original Ottawa HC played before the rise of professionalism in hockey. The club would continue until 1954, dissolving after crowds dwindled, citing the rise of hockey on television. The club would win the Allan Cup in 1949.

== Women's teams ==
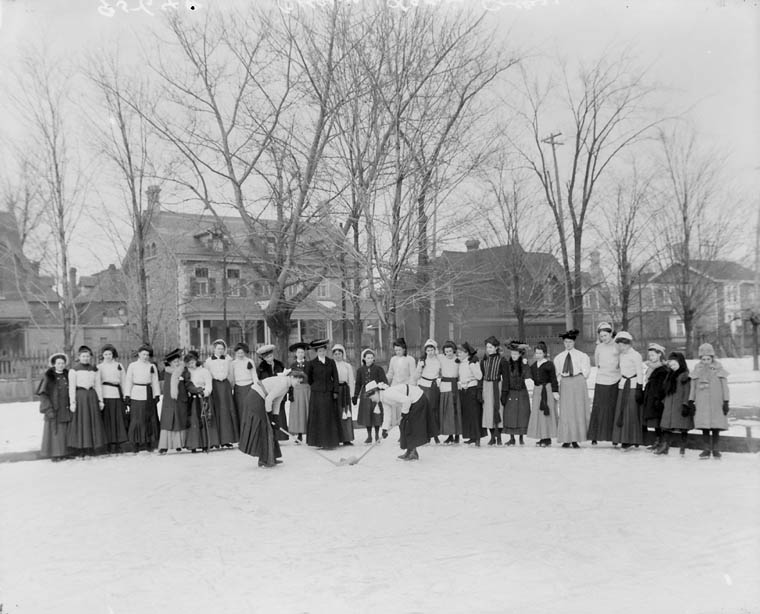
Ottawa Ladies' College group playing hockey, 1906

Teams were formed prior to 1915 at Ottawa Ladies' College and the Young Women's Christian Association, but they did not play outside teams. In 1915, the Ottawa Alerts were organized, featuring the best women's players in Ottawa. The team were immediately champions. In 1916, the club defeated the Pittsburgh Ladies Club three times in one day, then defeated Toronto the following day. The team, based at Dey's Arena was not in a league, but played exhibitions in a circuit from Montreal to Renfrew. Their first coach was Hamby Shore. In 1922–23, the Alerts won the Canadian championship. The club then passed under the sponsorship of the Ottawa Rowing Club. The team would win one more Canadian championship before it was folded in 1929. Eva Ault of the Ottawa Alerts is crediting with helping to popularize women's hockey during the early 20th century.

== World War II years ==
During the World War II years, NHL players enlisted in the war effort. A large number of them were posted to Ottawa base. This included the complete Boston Bruins 'Kraut Line'. The clubs played in the Quebec Senior Hockey League, and the Ottawa Commandos (war-time name for the Senators) and the Ottawa RCAF Flyers won the Allan Cup senior men's Canadian ice hockey championship.

== Postwar teams ==
After World War II, Ottawa's RCAF Flyers, a senior amateur team, played in the 1948 Winter Olympics, representing Canada and winning the gold medal. The club had won the Allan Cup in 1942.

The Senior Senators continued to play in the Quebec Senior Hockey League after the war. While unaffiliated with any NHL team, Senators players were often the property of the Montreal Canadiens, Toronto Maple Leafs or former Ottawa-born NHLers reinstated as amateurs. Larry Regan, future GM of the Los Angeles Kings played for the Senators before moving to the American Hockey League. The QSHL became the QHL professional league in 1953. By then, Tommy Gorman, who had owned the club when it was a member of the NHL, was back as owner of the team and the Ottawa Auditorium. In the face of national broadcasts on Saturday nights of the Canadiens and the Toronto Maple Leafs, he suspended the club in December 1954.

After the Senior Senators dissolved in 1954, the senior Hull-Ottawa Canadiens were formed, an affiliate of the Montreal Canadiens, managed by future hall of famers Scotty Bowman and Sam Pollock. The club started play in the Ontario Hockey Association, and moved to the Eastern Professional Hockey League in 1959, playing four seasons before disbanding in 1963.

== Major junior hockey ==
The first Ottawa junior-age team to qualify for the Memorial Cup was the Ottawa Gunners of 1928, followed by the Ottawa Primroses of 1931. No teams qualified for the final until the 1950s.

When the Hull-Ottawa Canadiens were formed in 1956, a junior-age team was also formed, the Ottawa Junior Canadiens. Playing as an independent team, the team played senior-level teams and other junior-age team. The team qualified twice for the Memorial Cup, in 1957 and 1958, playing for the title both times against other Montreal Canadiens-sponsored junior teams. The Junior Canadiens won the 1958 Cup to become the first Ottawa team to win the Cup. In 1959, the junior team was suspended, and some of its players joined the senior squad.

The 1960s saw the return of top-level junior hockey to the city. The Ottawa 67s of the OHA began play in December 1967 at the new Ottawa Civic Centre. The Civic Centre, a Centennial project, had to open during 1967 or lose its federal funding. The 67s, which had been playing in Hull, narrowly accomplished the scheduled date, playing their first game in a partially finished Civic Centre on December 29, 1967.

The club has remained in the Civic Centre ever since, and as of 2009, is considered one of the most successful junior franchises in Canada. The club has won the Memorial Cup and hosted the Memorial Cup tournament.

== World Hockey Association ==
The Ottawa Nationals played in the WHA's inaugural season 1972–73. The team qualified for the 1973 WHA playoffs, losing in the first round. The team was not successful at the gate and left Ottawa when they could not come to terms with the City of Ottawa over the lease of the Civic Centre. They relocated the following season to Toronto, Ontario, to become the Toronto Toros; which in turn, would relocate in 1976–77 to Birmingham, Alabama, as the Birmingham Bulls. A second try in the WHA was attempted in 1976, when the Denver Spurs relocated to Ottawa to become the Ottawa Civics. The team folded after a handful of games, the final game against Gordie Howe and the Houston Aeros, played in Ottawa.

== Return of the NHL ==
The Senators were revived in 1990 after Bruce Firestone and Terrace Investments were granted an expansion franchise by the NHL. The Senators began play in the 1992–93 NHL season, playing their first three seasons in the Ottawa Civic Centre, while their new arena, the "Palladium" (now called the Canadian Tire Centre), was constructed, moving in January 1996. For their first four seasons, they were unsuccessful, finishing last in the league. In 1996, the team first qualified for the playoffs and qualified for the playoffs in eleven-straight seasons, peaking with a Stanley Cup Finals appearance in 2007, losing to the Anaheim Ducks. It had been 80 years since an Ottawa team had appeared in the Finals.

Firestone, while ambitious, did not have the finances to support the team. The team struggled financially from the start, financing the arena and its infrastructure. A recession in the early 1990s and a low Canadian dollar put pressure on the club's finances also. When one of the club's bankers failed in the early 2000s, the Senators were forced into bankruptcy themselves. The club did not fold or relocate, instead re-emerging under the new ownership of Eugene Melnyk a multi-millionaire Canadian businessman with enough personal wealth to own the club outright. Since Melnyk took over, the club has been successful financially, bolstered by the strong play of the on-ice product and strong attendance. The club expanded the seating capacity of Scotiabank Place and built the nearby Bell Sensplex arena facility.

== Adult recreational hockey ==
Ottawa plays host to nine organized adult hockey leagues throughout the city. Also known as Senior hockey leagues or Beer hockey leagues. These leagues are composed of amateur men and women starting from the age of twenty and upwards, with no restrictive age ceiling. Their target audience are adults who have a continued interest to play hockey at a recreational level following their minor hockey league careers or adults who have developed an appetite to learn a new sport. All skill levels are invited to join as most leagues have categorized divisions breaking down various competition level based on skill, age, experience and sex. (Younger players below the age of twenty are still eligible to play in minor league associations and if interested in playing organized hockey they can join leagues such as the Hockey East Ottawa Minor hockey league). All adult recreational hockey leagues in Ottawa are either privately run or run by the city and they are operated out of local arenas.

The costs associated to joining adult hockey leagues in Ottawa vary from league to league and they are based on the following factors: quality of ice surface, the age of the arena, time of play (peak or non-peak hours), level of arena maintenance, the services provided by organizers (referees, time keepers, live statistics tracking and prizes awarded following each game). League fees are used to pay for the ice rental and all other services described above.

Each league has their own set of rules governing the games and enforced by the referees on the ice, but in general they are roughly based on the National hockey league rules. The various league have different requirements relating to equipment warn while playing, however most require CSA approved equipment. The main goal of these leagues is to have fun, get some exercise and spend time with friends therefore they encourage safe play and mutual respect between players and referees.

The majority of leagues will run two season, running leagues in the summer and winter. The summer seasons run between late Spring until mid Summer for an approximate total of 14 games. The winter seasons run between late August until mid April for a minimum of 24 games. In addition to the season games, playoffs are held at the end of the regular season and the number of games played are based on elimination and the number of games played will depend on how far you can make it through, in the end crowning a champion for each division. Winning your division championship comes with a photo with the house trophy, bragging rights and a team prize of some kind.

Registration to an adult recreational hockey leagues is a month before the start of the season and done through each league's unique website and it is preferable to register a full team of ten players or more plus one goalie. However most senior hockey leagues offer the option of signing up as an individual player and the league organizers will help place individuals on teams with open roster spots.

== List of current teams ==
=== Professional teams ===
- Ottawa Senators
- Ottawa Lady Senators
- Ottawa Charge

=== CHL ===
- Ottawa 67s, Gatineau Olympiques

=== Junior 'A' ===
- Cumberland Grads, Kanata Lasers, Nepean Raiders, Rockland Nationals, Ottawa Jr. Senators

Note: Seven other teams play in the Ottawa Valley and surrounding area: Brockville Braves, Carleton Place Canadians, Cornwall Colts, Hawkesbury Hawks, Kemptville 73's, Pembroke Lumber Kings, and Smiths Falls Bears.

=== Associations ===
- Ottawa District Minor Hockey Association

=== Adult recreational hockey leagues ===
- Adult Ray Friel Hockey League – This league is based out of the Ray Friel Arena and Community Centre (built in 1994) located in Orleans.
- Capital Recreation Hockey League Inc. - This league plays games out of six different arenas, games will change location from game to game. The arenas are the following (Bell Sensplex, Richcraft Sensplex, Napean Sportsplex, Fred Barrett Arena, Bob MacQuarrie arena, Goulbourn Recreation Complex)
- Carleton Adult Hockey League – This league is based out of the Carleton University Ice House (built in 2005) located on the Carleton University Campus in Ottawa South.
- Minto Adult Hockey League – Minto has multiple 5-on-5 league and a 3-on-3 league based out of the Minto Arena (built in 1986) located in the East-industrial neighbourhood off St-Laurent blvd.
- Ottawa Adult Hockey League (OAHL) - This CARHA sponsored league is based out of the Tom Brown arena (built in 1971) located in the Hintonburg-Mechanicsville neighbourhood.
- Ottawa Senators Adult Hockey League (OSAHL) East and West – The east league is based out of the Richcraft Sensplex arena (built in 2014) located in the Gloucester area. The west league is based out of the Bell Sensplex (built in 2004) located in the Kanata area.
- Ottawa Travellers – The longest established adult recreational hockey league in Ottawa based out of two arenas, the University of Ottawa arena, located in the Sandy-Hill neighbourhood and the TD Place arena (formally Civic Centre – home of the Ottawa 67s), located in the Glebe-DowsLake neighbourhood.
- RA Centre – This league is based out of the Ray Kinsella Arena located off Riverside dr. In the Billings Bridge/Alta-Vista neighbourhood
- St-Laurent Adult Hockey League – This league is based out of the St-Laurent Complex located in the Vanier South neighbourhood.
- Ottawa Rec Hockey – This is an organized pick up hockey league based out of various arenas throughout the city.

=== Facilities ===
==== Major ====
- Canadian Tire Centre
- Ottawa Civic Centre
- Robert Guertin Arena

==== Arenas ====
- Bell Sensplex
- Jim Durrell Arena
- Nepean Sportsplex
- Sandy Hill Arena
- Tom Brown Arena
- Fred G Barret Arena
- Earl Armstrong Arena
- Minto Skating Centre

== List of Hockey Hall of Fame players from Ottawa ==
- Clint Benedict
- Frank Boucher
- George Boucher
- Punch Broadbent
- King Clancy
- Alex Connell
- Jack Darragh
- Mike Gartner
- Eddie Gerard
- Billy Gilmour
- Ebbie Goodfellow
- Syd Howe
- Aurel Joliat
- Brian Kilrea
- Frank McGee
- Frank Patrick
- Harvey Pulford
- Gordon Roberts
- Alf Smith
- Tommy Smith
- Bruce Stuart
- Hod Stuart
- Cooney Weiland
- Harry Westwick

== See also ==
- Sport in Ottawa

== References and notes ==
- Kitchen, Paul (2008). Win, Tie or Wrangle. Manotick, Ontario: Penumbra Press. ISBN 978-1-897323-46-5.
