= The Arena (Ottawa) =

Ice hockey arena in Ontario, Canada

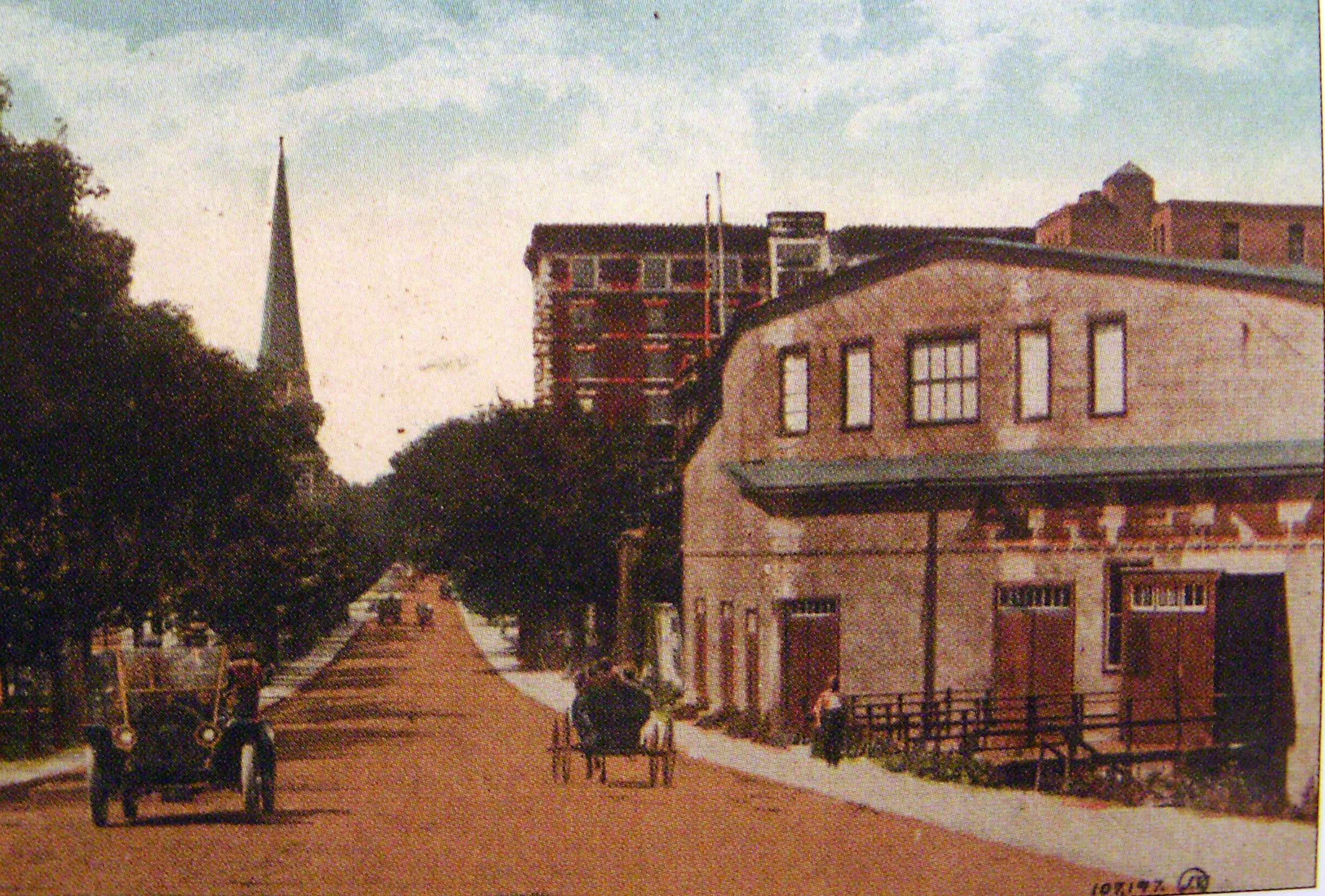
- Interactive map of The Arena
- Location: Laurier Avenue at the Canal, Ottawa, Ontario, Canada
- Coordinates: 45.422221°N 75.692024°W
- Capacity: 4,500, 7,000 (temporary)
- Surface: natural ice

Construction
- Groundbreaking: 1907
- Opened: January 11, 1908
- Closed: after 1923
- Demolished: 1927

Tenants
- Ottawa Hockey Club (ECAHA / NHA / NHL) (1908-1923)

The Arena, also known as Dey's Arena, or Ottawa Arena, was an arena for ice hockey located in Ottawa, Ontario, Canada. It was the home of the Ottawa Hockey Club from 1908 to 1923. It was the third in a series of ice hockey venues built by the Dey family of Ottawa. At the time of its construction, it was Canada's largest arena. It was one of the National Hockey League's original arenas.

== History ==
The arena was built in 1907 and was built because audiences for hockey matches had out-grown the previous arena, known as Dey's Rink or Dey's Arena. The spectator capacity was 7,000, of which 2,500 was standing room. 'The Arena', as it was called, was built on leased land at Laurier Avenue at the Rideau Canal, on the location of today's Confederation Park, near the current Ottawa city hall. This is very close to the location of the first Dey's Rink, which was located on the opposite bank of the Canal. It is also close to the location of the Royal Rink at 28 Slater, which was where the Ottawa Hockey Club first practised in 1883. The land for The Arena was leased from landowner Esther Sherwood for the rate of CA$166.66 per month, for twenty years.

The Arena opened on January 11, 1908, for a game between Ottawa and the Montreal Wanderers, the top rivalry of the day. The last Senators game at the arena was held on March 10, 1923, after which the team moved to the Ottawa Auditorium. The Ottawa Auditorium was also built by the Deys, who were part owners of the Ottawa Senators. This third rink was torn down by the federal government at the end of the lease in 1927 to make way for the ceremonial 'Driveway' improvement project along the Rideau Canal.

The Arena hosted the 1910 and 1911 Stanley Cup challenges, and the 1920 Stanley Cup Final, all won by the Senators. (The 1921 and 1923 Ottawa Stanley Cup wins were won out west.)

The Arena was used for other sports as well as ice hockey. The 1912 Canadian Figure Skating Championships were held in February 1912 at the Arena. Boxing matches were held there including Canadian heavyweight champion Tommy Burns versus Len Darcy, and Canadian lightweight champion Bobby Ebber versus Homer LeBlanc on October 16, 1925. The matches drew over two thousand fans.

== Building ==
The Arena was a large improvement internally from the previous Dey Arena. The dressing rooms, rest rooms, smoking rooms and lobby were steam-heated. The main doors were on Laurier Avenue, and a north entrance existed onto Slater Street, which at the time extended to the Canal. The exterior was simple, and did not meet Sherwood's lease criteria of a 'worthy architectural feature' of Ottawa. At its building, it was the largest ice arena in Canada.

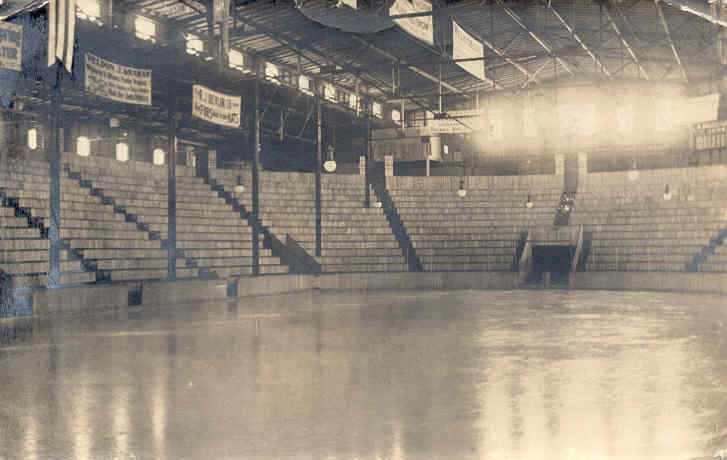
Interior of The Arena, c. 1920

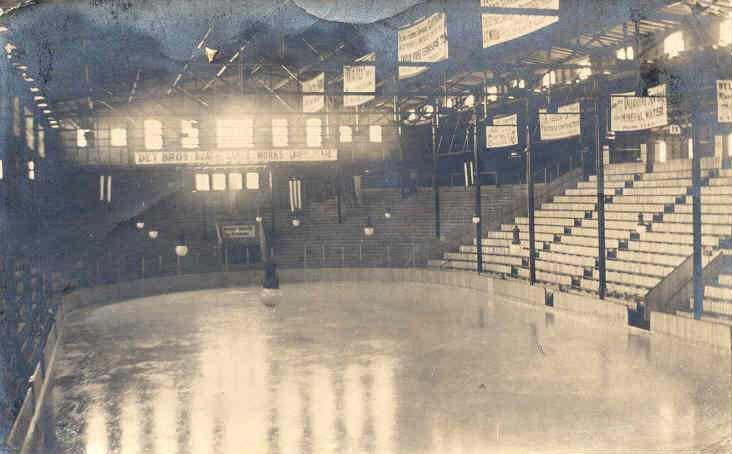
Interior of The Arena, c. 1920

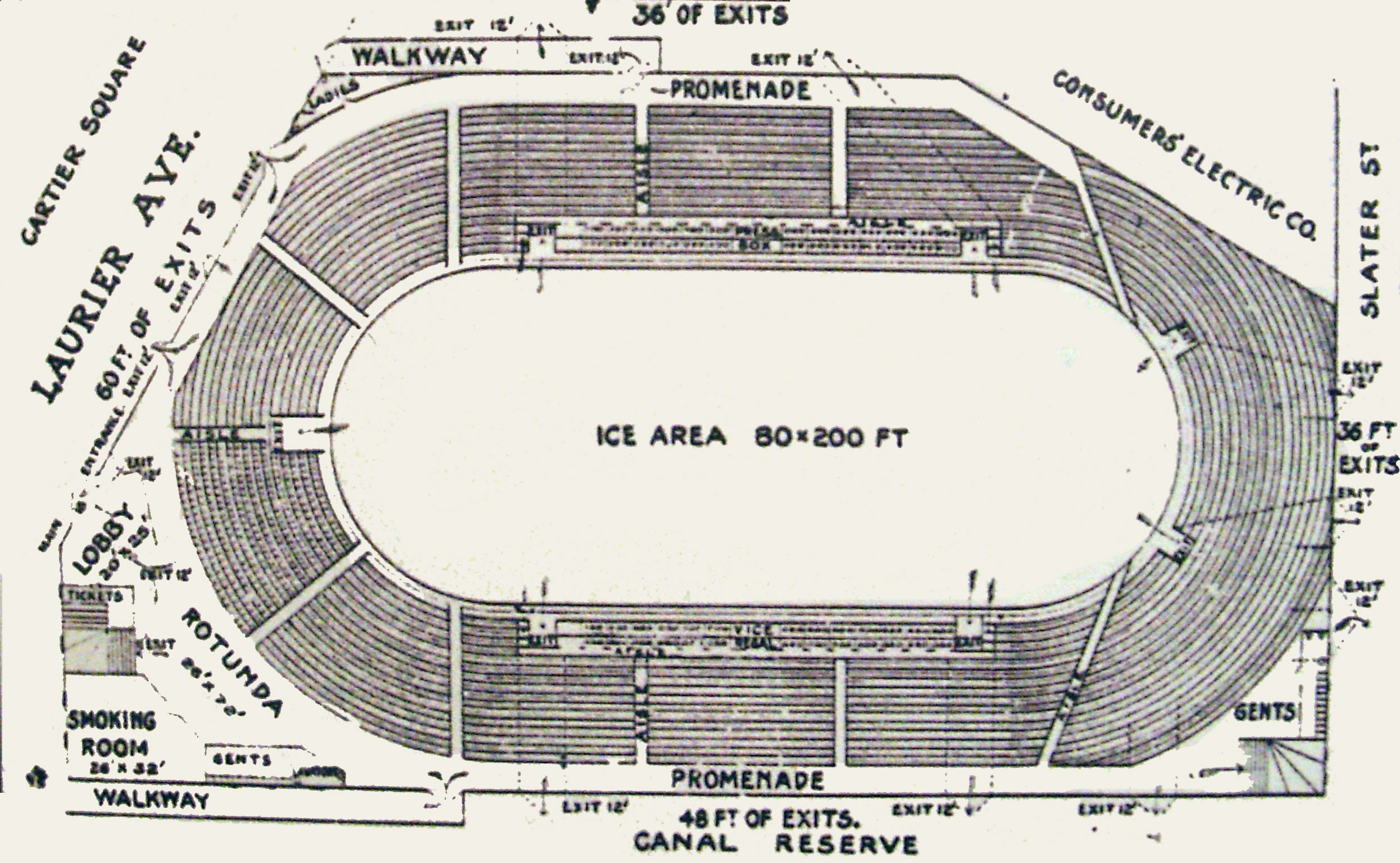
Plan of The Arena, c. 1907

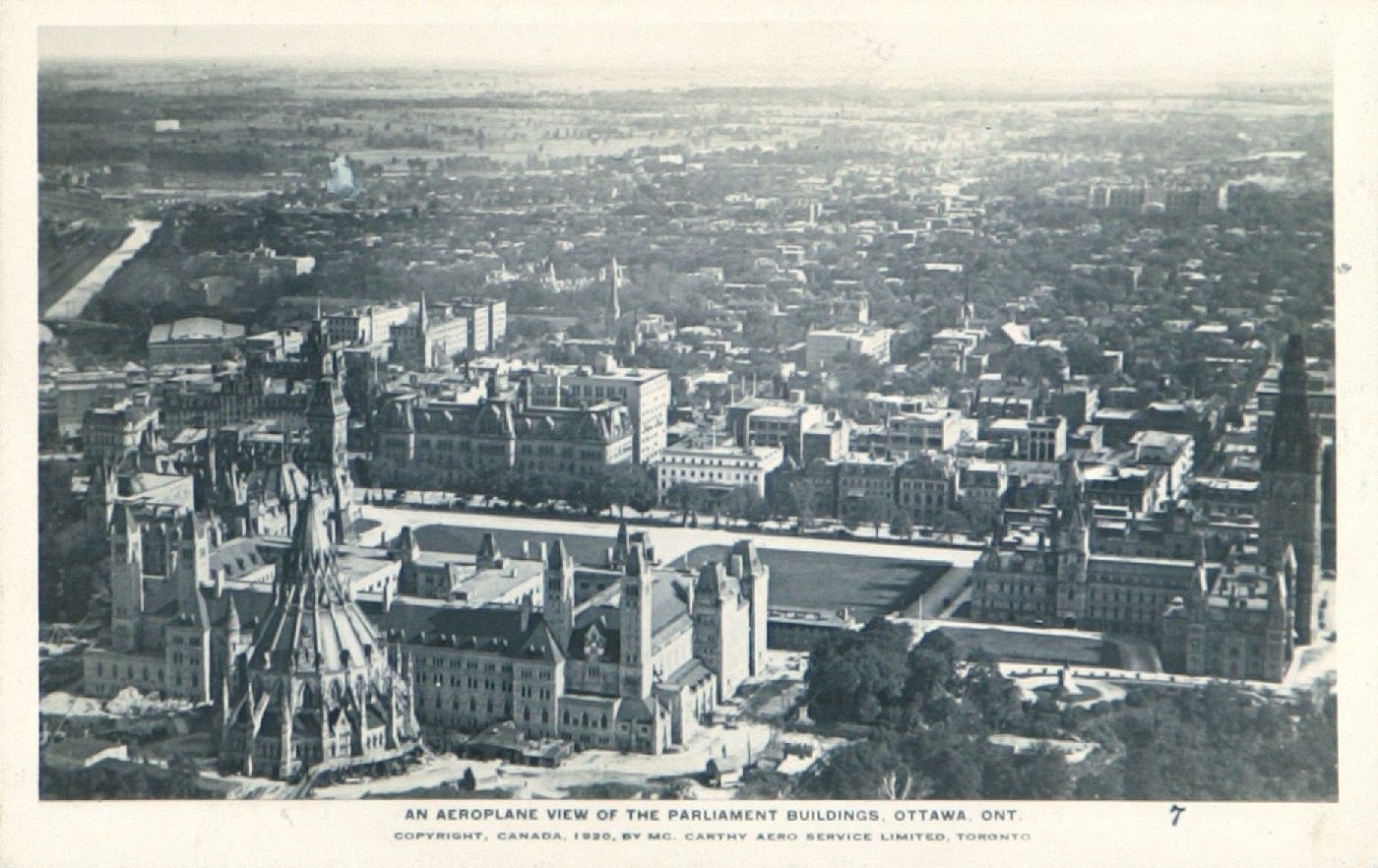
Aerial view of downtown Ottawa, c. 1920. Arena can be seen at middle left.

=== Ice surface ===
The Arena ice surface (natural) was unusually shaped. Both ends are curved, with no straight sections behind the net. This design was passed along to the successor Ottawa Auditorium ice surface design.

== See also ==
- Ted Dey

Preceded by Dey's Skating Rink	Home of the Ottawa Hockey Club; 1908–1923	Succeeded by Ottawa Auditorium
