= William Dey =

Canadian ice hockey player

- Born: June 4, 1870; Ottawa, Ontario, Canada
- Died: August 20, 1921 (aged 51); Ottawa, Ontario, Canada
- Known for: Owner of the Ottawa Senators (1917-1923); Owner of Dey's Arenas
- Relatives: Ted Dey (brother); Edgar Dey (nephew)
Ice hockey career
- Played for: Ottawa Hockey Club (1892-1897)

William Ernest Dey (June 4, 1870 – August 20, 1921) was an early amateur ice hockey player for the Ottawa Hockey Club. He was a member of the Dey family of Ottawa, Canada which was successful in boat-building, arenas and ice hockey businesses. He was born in Ottawa.

== Playing career ==
Dey first joined the senior Ottawa Hockey Club in 1892. He played six seasons with Ottawa HC, retiring after the 1897 season. He died in Ottawa in 1921 after an illness and is buried at Beechwood Cemetery.

== See also ==
- Ted Dey
- Edgar Dey
