= Ottawa Auditorium =

Arena for sports and entertainment

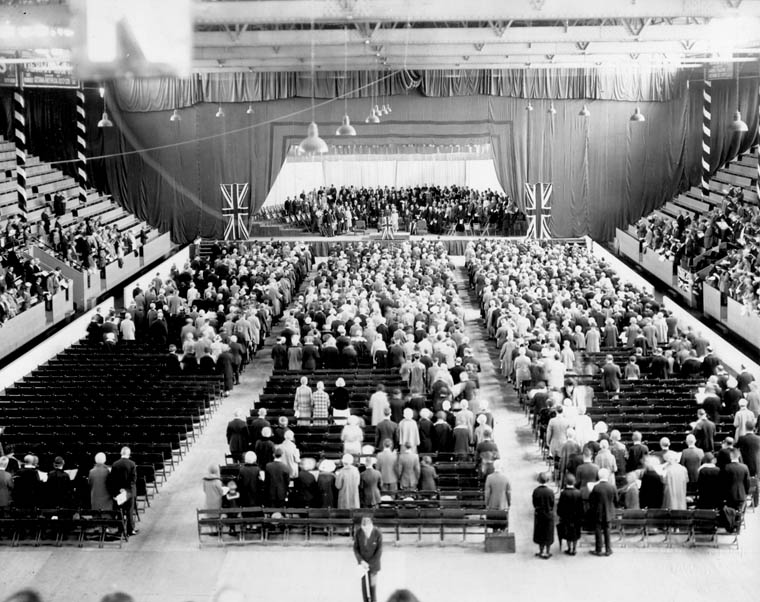
- A Thanksgiving Service in the Auditorium, 1927
- Interactive map of Ottawa Auditorium
- Location: Argyle at O'Connor Street, Ottawa, Ontario, Canada
- Coordinates: 45°24′41″N 75°41′23″W
- Owner: Ottawa Auditorium Ltd (1923–1944); Tommy Gorman
- Capacity: Main auditorium: 7,500, 10,000 (temporary); Concert hall: 800
- Surface: mechanically frozen ice
- Field size: 200 ft × 80 ft (surface), 200 ft × 360 ft (building)

Construction
- Groundbreaking: April 1923
- Opened: December 26, 1923
- Demolished: 1967
- Cost: $355,000 ($6.34 million in 2025 dollars)
- Architects: Richards and Abra

Tenants
- Ottawa Senators (NHL) (1923–1934); Ottawa Senators (QAHA / QSHL) (1934–1954); Hull-Ottawa Canadiens (EPHL) (1959–1963)

The Ottawa Auditorium was a 7,500-seat arena located in Ottawa, Ontario. It was located in Downtown Ottawa at the corner of O'Connor and Argyle Streets, today the site of the Taggart Family YMCA. Built primarily for ice hockey, the arena was also used for sports events, assemblies and musical concerts.

== History ==
It was built in 1923 with a 10,000-person capacity (seated and standing) to be the home arena of the NHL's Ottawa Senators by the Ottawa Auditorium Limited, a consortium controlled by T. Franklin Ahearn and Senators' owners Edgar Dey and Tommy Gorman. It replaced The Arena, built in 1907. The first NHL game held there was played on December 26, 1923, between Ottawa and the Montreal Canadiens, before 8,300 fans, in which Howie Morenz scored his first NHL goal.

The building was state-of-the-art for its time. For performances and assemblies, the arena had a concert stage that would be assembled at one end of the rink, facing the length of the rink. The shape of the ice was not quite orthogonal, it is described as being somewhat 'egg-shaped' with semi-circular end boards, rather than the straight end boards with rounded corners of today's ice rinks. This design matched the shape of the rink at The Arena.

At the time of construction, the consortium took over the ownership of the hockey club as well. In 1924, Dey sold his share of the consortium and exited the rink business ending the Dey family's ownership of ice rinks in Ottawa dating back to the 1870s. In 1925, Gorman exited hockey in Ottawa, moving to New York to manage the New York Americans. Gorman sold his share to Ahearn, picking up ownership of the Connaught race track in Aylmer, Quebec. By 1930, the Auditorium was losing money as the Ottawa Senators losses increased. The Auditorium Limited debts to the Ahearn family would lead to the Senators NHL team suspending operations, then starting up again when capital was raised in 1932. By 1934, the Senators split into two clubs. The NHL franchise was moved to St. Louis, Missouri, becoming the St. Louis Eagles. The Senators were continued as a senior amateur hockey team playing out of the Auditorium. The move to St. Louis was not a success. The franchise was still a drain on the Auditorium and was folded by the NHL in 1935. In 1936, the Auditorium went into receivership and was controlled by the Royal Securities Corporation until 1945, when Gorman returned and purchased the building and the Senators. Gorman would remain an owner until he died in 1962.

The arena was demolished in 1967 and replaced at that location by the YMCA-YWCA building (180 Argyle Avenue). Its replacement, the Ottawa Civic Centre (arena) opened in 1967. It is located on Bank Street in The Glebe in Lansdowne Park.

== Sports use ==
Auditorium in 1953. Senators game and Minto Follies upcoming events

=== Ice hockey ===
It was the home arena of the original NHL Senators from 1923 to 1934. In 1923, the Senators were the defending Stanley Cup champions and they opened the Auditorium on December 1, 1923, with an exhibition game against the Edmonton Eskimos, the team Ottawa had defeated to win the Stanley Cup. The game was attended by the Governor General Lord Byng and Lady Byng.

The Senators won the 1927 Stanley Cup in the Auditorium, the decisive game on April 13, 1927, against the Boston Bruins. The April 13 game at the Auditorium was the last Stanley Cup finals game in Ottawa until the June 2, 2007, game played at Scotiabank Place between the revived Senators NHL franchise and the Anaheim Ducks. It is known that one fan, Russell Williams, attended both games, both won by Ottawa. It also held the final game of the 1924 Stanley Cup Finals between Montreal and Calgary because the Canadiens' home rink, the Mount Royal Arena, did not have proper ice. The Auditorium was only the second arena east of Manitoba with artificial ice-making capability, which was state of the art at the time.

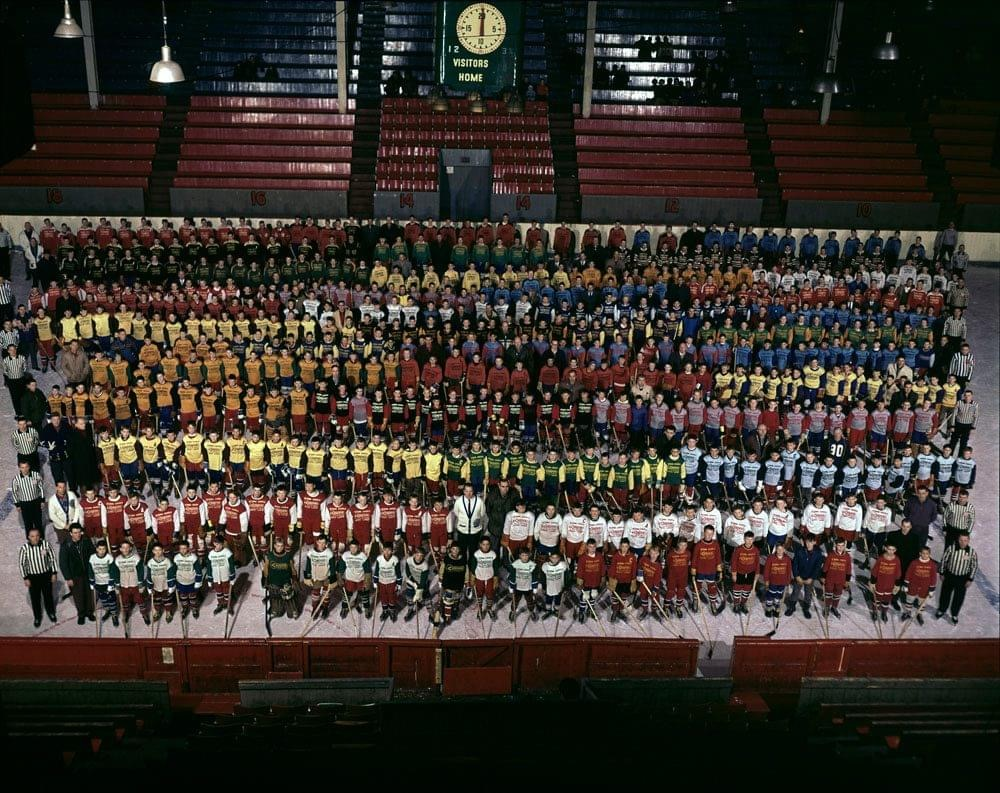
Ice hockey players in the Cradle League, ages eight to seventeen, at the Ottawa Auditorium in 1964

After 1934, the NHL franchise relocated to St. Louis, Missouri, and the Ottawa Senators became a senior amateur team, first playing in the Quebec Amateur Hockey Association's 'Montreal Group.' The club won the Allan Cup Canadian amateur championship in 1949. From 1945 until 1954 the team played in the Quebec Senior Hockey League, becoming a professional team again in 1952. After the Senators folded in 1954, attributed to the rise of televised ice hockey matches, the professional Hull-Ottawa Canadiens played in the Auditorium.

The arena hosted games of the 1931 and 1958 Memorial Cup Canadian men's junior ice hockey championship finals. The Ottawa Junior Canadiens were the victors of the 1958 series against the Regina Pats.

The last hockey game ever played at the Auditorium was a Junior "B" playoff game in which the Hawkesbury Combines defeated the Ottawa Astros 6–5 in overtime to take a 2–1 lead in games. The ice came out the very next day on April 3, 1967.

=== Skating ===
The arena hosted the annual "Minto Follies" displays of figure skating by Ottawa's Minto Skating Club, and in later years, performances of the Ice Follies. Sonja Henie and her show both in her amateur and professional days performed at the Auditorium. The Auditorium hosted the 1923, 1931 and 1947 North American Figure Skating Championships.

=== Other sports ===
In boxing:

- Jim Corbett, Jack Sharkey, Max Baer, Joe Louis, Joe Walcott and Rocky Marciano appeared in exhibitions at the Auditorium.

In basketball:

- Harlem Globetrotters played annual games

And:

- wrestling
- indoor track meets
- indoor tennis matches, including Bill Tilden, Don Budge, Pancho Gonzales, Pancho Segura and Bobby Riggs.

== Non-sports use ==
It was also the site of many of the city's major events and concerts. Among the performers known to have performed there:

- Boston Symphony Orchestra
- Chicago Symphony Orchestra
- Gracie Fields
- John McCormack
- Moscow Circus
- Philadelphia Symphony Orchestra
- Ezio Pinza
- Lily Pons
- Elvis Presley
- Red Army Chorus
- The Rolling Stones
- Frank Sinatra
- John Philip Sousa
- Bob Dylan

=== Notable concerts ===
Ottawa radio station CFRA's first broadcast was from the auditorium on May 3, 1947, with a concert by Percy Faith and his 40 piece Orchestra, and a 60-voice choir to an audience of more than 10,000 people. Ottawa Mayor J. E. Stanley Lewis proclaimed the station "officially on the air".

On April 3, 1957 Elvis Presley performed two shows. Along with a pair of performances in Toronto the previous day, this marked the first time he performed outside the U.S. More than 200 members of Parliament failed to turn up for an evening session in the House of Commons that day: most went to see Elvis instead.

On April 24, 1965, The Rolling Stones performed one show at the Auditorium, by then owned by the YM-YWCA, attended by "3,400 screaming teenagers." The band did not perform again in Ottawa until 40 years later on August 28, 2005, at Frank Clair Stadium.

The Auditorium was also the site of dance performances. On April 23, 1924, actress Louise Brooks appeared as one of the dancers of the Denishawn Dance Company at the Auditorium.

Other rock stars who appeared at the Auditorium included Buddy Holly, Bob Dylan, Brenda Lee, Ray Charles, Fats Domino, The Everly Brothers and Paul Anka.

=== Other ===
The Auditorium was also the site of political conventions and election campaign rallies.

The Auditorium contained a shop run by Hermes A. Proulx who hand-made hockey sticks to order. The sticks would be used by NHL players, and one exists from the 1934 All-Star Game. Proulx, who had first made sticks in 1912 for the Hurd Company sports shop, went into business for himself in 1920. In 1925–26, he worked with the expansion New York Americans, before setting up his shop in the Auditorium in 1926. He hand-made sticks and sharpened skates at the shop until he retired in 1944. While he primarily worked for the Senators; the Bruins, Maple Leafs and Red Wings all used his sticks.

== Closing ==
The Auditorium held its final event on October 1, 1967; a concert by Guy Lombardo and his Royal Canadians. The building was demolished and a YMCA complex took over the location. The Ottawa Civic Centre opened in December 1967.

== See also ==
- Ice hockey in Ottawa

Preceded by The Arena, Ottawa	Home of the Ottawa Senators (NHL); 1923 – 1934	Succeeded by last arena
Preceded by None	Ottawa Senators (QAHA/QSHL); 1934 – 1954	Succeeded by None
Preceded by None	Hull-Ottawa Canadiens; 1956 – 1963	Succeeded by None
