= Reginald Bradley =

Canadian ice hockey and football player

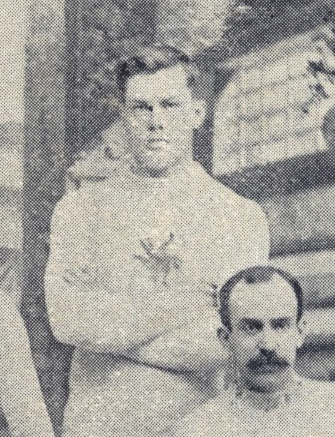
- Bradley pictured in the 1892 Ottawa Hockey club photo
- Born: November 27, 1873 Ottawa, Ontario, Canada
- Died: July 27, 1922 (aged 48) Montreal, Quebec, Canada
- Position: Forward
- Played for: Ottawa Hockey Club
- Playing career: 1890–1894

Reginald Richard Bradley (November 27, 1873 – July 27, 1922) was a Canadian ice hockey and football player. Bradley played for the Ontario champion Ottawa Hockey Club from 1890 to 1894. During the 1892–93 Ottawa Hockey Club season, he led the club with 11 goals in 8 games.

== Personal information ==
Bradley attended Ottawa Collegiate Institute in Ottawa, captaining the football team. He attended law school at Toronto University and Osgoode Hall Law School and worked for a well-known law firm in Ottawa. He died of a short illness in July 1922.
