= Minto Follies =

There was a time when belonging to the Minto Skating Club gave skaters a chance to sparkle as performers in an annual show called the Minto Follies, inaugurated in 1926 and going strong well into the 1970s. The Minto Follies were produced every year for 41 years, from 1926 to 1967, and thereafter intermittently until a final glorious performance in 1997. In its heyday, in 1952, Mayfair Magazine praised the Minto Follies as "the first and best chorus on ice."

== History ==
The inspiration for the Minto Follies came from the winter carnivals that were once part of the wintertime life in Canada. In 1926 at the inspiration of Melville Rogers, Minto distilled many of those earlier elements into the format of a show and christened it the "Minto Follies." The idea was to showcase talented club members, along with Canadian, North American and World Champions. "The spectacle of the Follies is plans as a whole with nine to ten courts," Charlotte Whitton (Ottawa mayor in the 1950s and 1960s) wrote in 1950, "separated by singles, doubles and feature skating items. Each Court is an undertaking in itself, requiring extensive charts and diagrams, locating each skater and moving him or her through the rhythmic grace and intricacy of the act."

The Minto Follies were a big draw in their day. Peter Chance (Canadian Junior Men's Champion, 1937) began a lifelong association with skating as a spectator at one of the performances. "It all began for me in the winter of 1932, when I was taken to see the ‘Minto Follies,’ which that year, had a special attraction - the Olympic Champions who had only weeks before won there gold medals at a Lake Placid, New York." Before the days of television, it was the Minto Follies that brought the World and Olympic champions to Ottawa and gave local audiences a chance to see skaters like Sonja Henie, the Norwegian champion who dominated world skating from 1927 to 1936. She was ten times World and three times Olympic champion after retiring in 1936, she was the world's first great professionals skating star. Peter Chance remembers seeing Henie skating in the Minto Follies. In later years, Chance performed in the Minto Follies himself:

To prepare for this Show, starting in November, the Club professional and choreographer would set about the composition of an overall theme and a program of the very young children to the elderly but still able. It was a club policy to involve as many as possible so that we could all say we had a part to play.

In the old days, the Minto Follies played to sell-out crowds, with people lining up to get advance tickets at a shop on Sparks street, and there were usually stars in the audience as well as on ice. The Auditorium featured a "Royal" box to accommodate special quests, who regularly included the Governor General Lord Athlone and his wife Princess Alice (the grand daughter of Queen Victoria) attended, along with her exiled cousin, Princess Juliana of the Netherlands. Prime Minister Mackenzie King was also in the audience that night, along with various members of Parliament and the mayor of Ottawa. The Follies had some royal glitter of its own in the 1940s, when little Elizabeth Abel-Smith, Princess Alice’s granddaughter, joined the club and skated a sweet little number called " Bisque Dolls." In 1976, during one of the revivals, King Hussein of Jordan and his queen attended a performance and after the show were almost certainly impressed to encounter[Wingate Snaith (Canadian Junior Champion, 1935) grandly garbed à l’arbe for his part in the production.

Every year the Minto Follies took a different theme. In 1932, it was the Aurora Borealis. In the 1936, the club launched the SS Minto "Cruise Around the World on Skates." In 1937 Coronation Year, Minto presented "Rule Britannia," with skaters all dressed in purple to celebrate the accession of King George VI to the throne. For every production grand and colourful design were painted on the ice, then flooded and frozen in. Costumes were designed to reflect the chosen theme, and many a team of mother and friends occupied the sewing room (originally next to the ladies’ dressing room at the old Minto rink), where they cut a sewed and fitted costumes for a troupe that could number as many as 400 skaters in the heyday of the Follies. There were times, however, when the skaters also benefited from the talents of a team of professional seamstresses such as Mesdemoiselles Rainville and Pelletier, who set virtual factory in the room underneath the bleachers at the Minto rink (this room was a late addition). there, they produced costumes and transformed young skaters into Can Can girls, flowers, raindrops and powder puffs.

The Minto Follies were slick. The Sparkled. For decades, they were an Ottawa tradition.
