= Rideau Skating Rink =

Skating and curling facility in Ontario, Canada

Rideau Rink
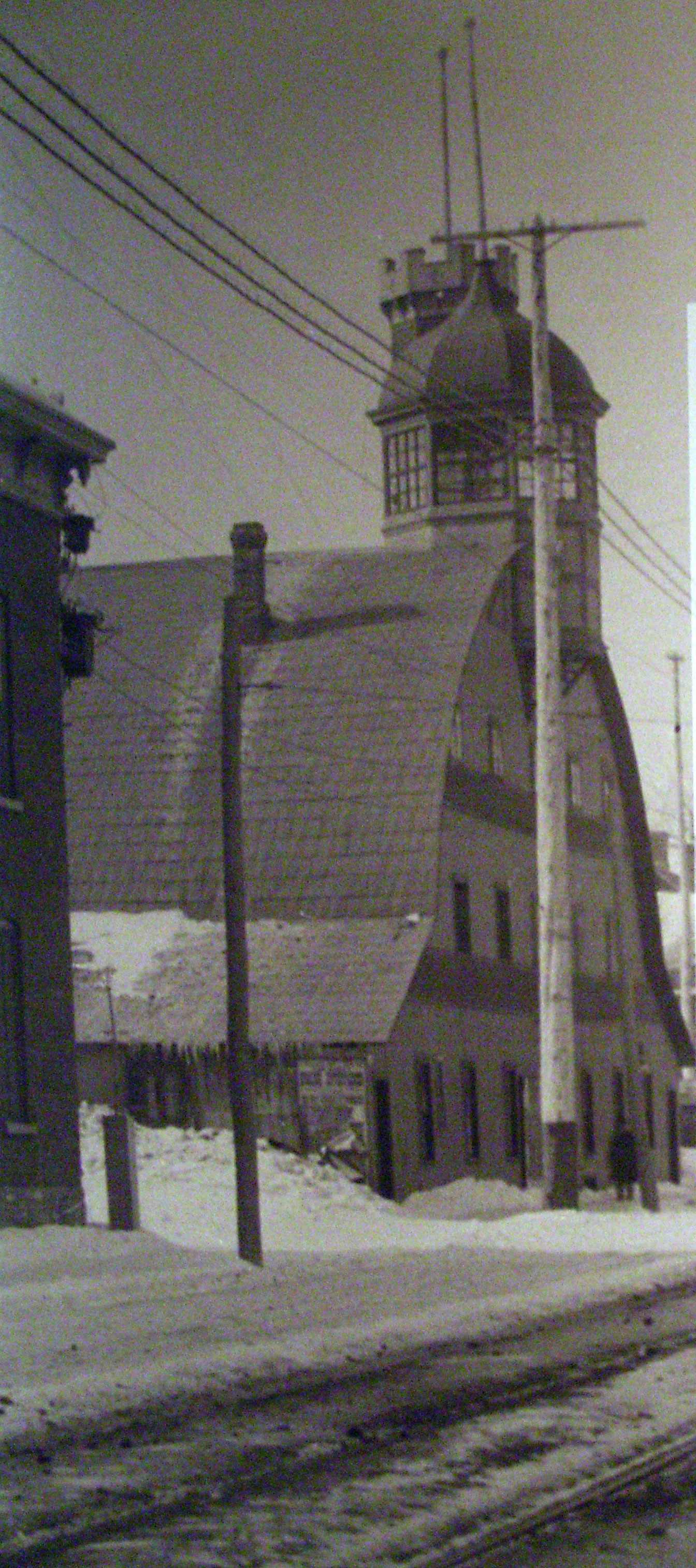
- Interactive map of Rideau Rink
- Location: Corner of Theodore (now Laurier) and Waller
- Coordinates: 45°25′25″N 75°41′09″W
- Owner: Rideau Skating and Curling Club
- Operator: Rideau Skating and Curling Club
- Surface: Multi-surface (one curling, one hockey and figure skating)

Construction
- Groundbreaking: 1887
- Opened: February 1st 1889
- Renovated: 1919

Tenants
- Ottawa Hockey Club, several local hockey leagues, skating and curling clubs

The Rideau Skating Rink was an indoor skating and curling facility located in Ottawa, Ontario, Canada. Consisting of a curling rink and a skating rink, it was one of the first indoor rinks in Canada. The Rideau Rink was scheduled to open on January 10, 1889, but unseasonably mild weather postponed the grand opening to February 1. It opened on January 25, 1889 for select V.I.P.s although this was a misunderstanding and should not have denied entry to season ticket holders. It was located on Theodore Street, (now Laurier Avenue) at Waller Street, at the present location of the Arts Hall of the University of Ottawa, near the Rideau Canal.

Besides curling and recreational skating, the rink was also used for ice hockey and figure skating. It was the site of the first recorded organized women's ice hockey game on March 8, 1889. It was also the site of the first Ontario men's ice hockey championship game on March 7, 1891.

== History ==
Skating was popular in the 1880s in Ottawa. Ottawans would skate on the Rideau and Ottawa rivers and the Rideau Canal, and at covered rinks such as the Royal and Dey's Rink. As in Montreal, costume skating carnivals were highlights of the social scene.

By 1887, the Royal Rink had been converted into a roller rink and the demand for ice time on the Dey's Rink was greater than the rink could supply. Due to the lack of ice time available, the Ottawa Hockey Club became dormant. Local investors, together with the Capital Skating Club decided to build a new rink, finer than Montreal's Victoria Skating Rink. The new rink was also to be used for curling, so the enterprise became known as the Rideau Skating and Curling Club. The project was sponsored by Lord Stanley, the Governor-General, who took shares in the project.

Advertisement for sale of land where the Rideau Skating Rink was to be built.

The rink had separate skating and curling surfaces, and was laid out in an 'L' plan, with one entrance on Theodore and one on Waller. The entrance on Theodore had a cupola. The roof was supported by 42-foot (13 m) high arches. The construction was not without incident and the incomplete building collapsed in a windstorm on November 16, 1888, but the building was ready for skating in January 1889. Lord Stanley participated in its formal opening festivities on February 1, 1889. The Rideau Rink hosted a small version of a Winter Carnival on its opening night which was a huge success. The 43rd band under the direction of James Carter, band master, gave an excellent programme.

Winter Carnival Programme
Orchestral style	Orchestral number
Grand March; Lancers; Maypole Waltz; Grand March; Maypole Waltz; Lancers; Waltz; Grand March; Waltz; Waltz	Scottish Beauties; Mikado; All the Rage; Daring; The Pretty Skaters; Dorothy; Dreamsong; Patience; Happy Memories; Anon

Organized ice hockey activities began with a game on February 14, 1889, played between members of the Ottawa and Rideau social clubs. James Creighton captained the Rideau team and P. D. Ross captained the Ottawa team. The next day Ross and Creighton would officiate at a match between civilian and military teams.

In 1894, the rink was "improved and repaired" in time for an exhibition game on December 27, 1894 between the Montreal Hockey Club and the Ottawa Hockey Club, won by Ottawa 5–1.

Starting in 1904, the rink was used by the Minto Skating Club. Several Canadian figure skating championships were held there by the Minto Club, although the first official Canadian championship took place in 1914 in Montreal. In 1907, a fire occurred at the rink, causing the cancellation of a planned Canadian figure skating championship.

In 1916, the rink was taken over by the federal government for World War I purposes. The curling club moved to Victoria Street, on the approximate location of today's Supreme Court of Canada building. In 1922, a new Rideau rink was built nearby on Waller Street, to the east of today's 'Rideau Centre' shopping centre. The new rink was eventually taken over by the Minto club exclusively and renamed the Minto Rink. The Minto Rink was destroyed by fire in 1949. The club would build a new rink on Henderson Avenue.

The original Rideau Rink was demolished to build the Fine Arts Building of the University of Ottawa. The Rideau Curling Club eventually moved to a facility on Cooper Street, where it continues today and celebrated its 125th anniversary in November 2013.

== Ice hockey ==
=== First recorded women's games ===
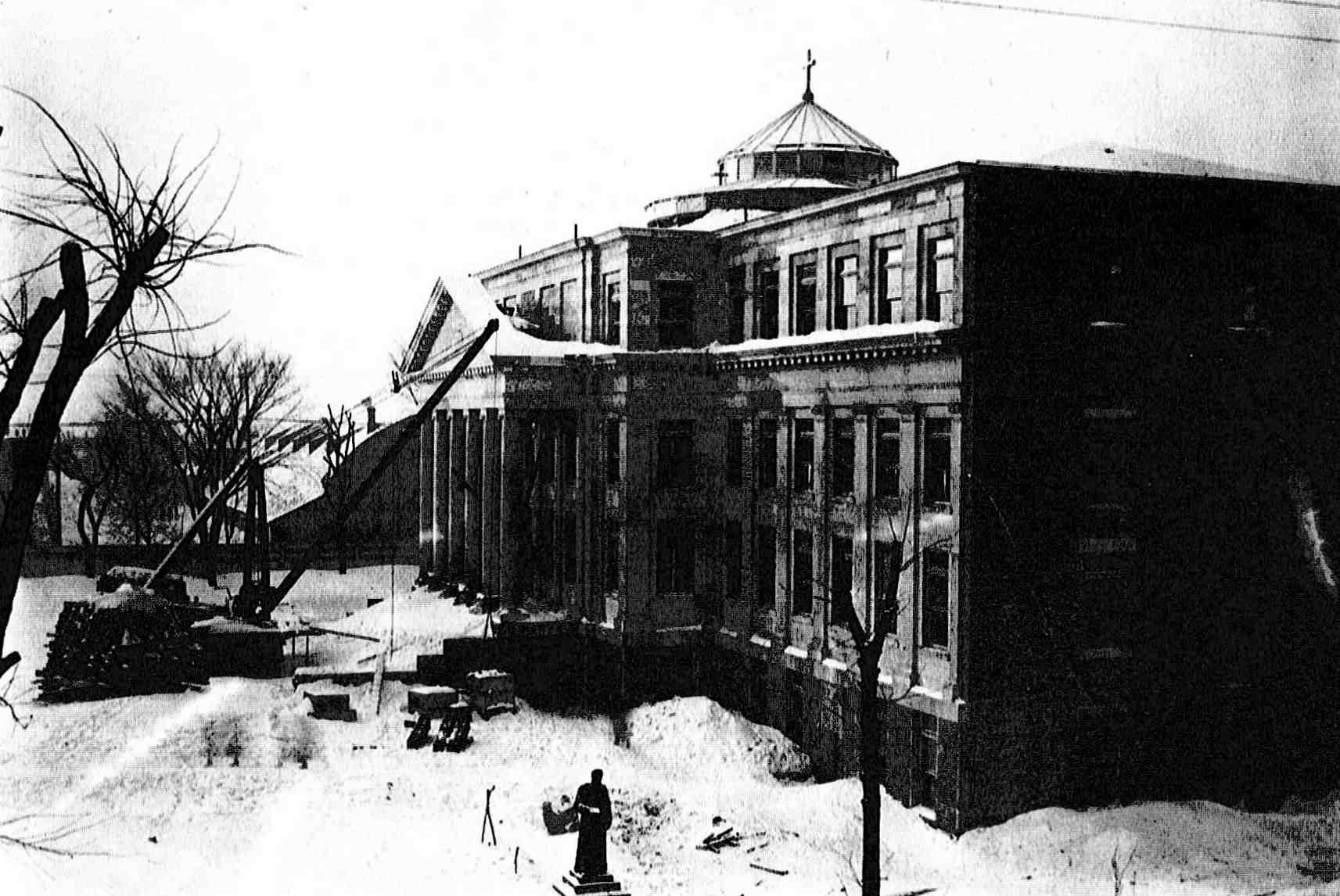
Tabaret Hall and Rideau Rink, 1903. Rink building can be seen behind the construction cranes

Played on March 8, 1889, Ottawa Evening Journal reported that the lineups were:

- Government House—Miss Lister (captain), Mrs. Bagot, Hon. Isobel Stanley and Miss Kingsford
- Rideau Skating club—Mrs. Jones (captain), Mrs. Crombie and the two Miss Scotts

The Government House team won. The score was not reported.

A seven-a-side game was recorded in the Ottawa Citizen on February 11, 1891 at the rink:

A ladies' hockey match was played at the Rideau Rink yesterday between teams as follows:
No. 1: Miss M. Mackintosh, captain; Miss L. Wise, Miss Munro, Miss A. Ritchie, Miss Cambie, Miss Jones, Miss White.
No. 2: Miss H. Wise, captain; Miss A. Mackintosh, Miss M. Ritchie, Miss McClymont, Miss Burrows and the Misses Gordon.
Number two team won by two goals to 0.

=== First Ontario championship ===
The first championship game of the new Ontario Hockey Association was held on March 7, 1891 between the Ottawa Hockey Club and Toronto St. George's. Ottawa won the game 5–0. The game was attended by 1,000 fans.

Ottawa	Toronto St. George's
Albert Morel - goal; Jack Kerr - point, Weldy Young - cover point, P. D. Ross - forward, Halder Kirby - forward, Chauncey Kirby - forward, J. Smith - forward	Hurst, -goal; Henderson, - point; Hargraft, - cover point; Lucas, - forward; Thompson, - forward; Pemberton, - forward; F. W. Jackson - forward
Referee - A. Z. Palmer

The teams would play an exhibition two weeks later in Toronto, which Ottawa won 4–0 at the Mutual Street Rink. Ottawa would play the same day against Osgoode Hall at the Toronto Victoria Rink, winning 6–2.

=== Other hockey ===
The rink is known to have been used in Amateur Hockey Association of Canada men's play by the Ottawa Hockey Club from 1889 until 1895. The club also returned to it for one season in 1898. The Ottawa City Hockey League held matches at the rink. The Ottawa College also used the rink.

== See also ==
- Ice hockey in Ottawa
- Rideau Curling Club

== Notes ==
Preceded by Dey's Arena (first)	Home of the Ottawa Hockey Club; 1889 – 1896, 1898	Succeeded by Dey's Arena (second)
