= Eva Ault =

Canadian ice hockey player

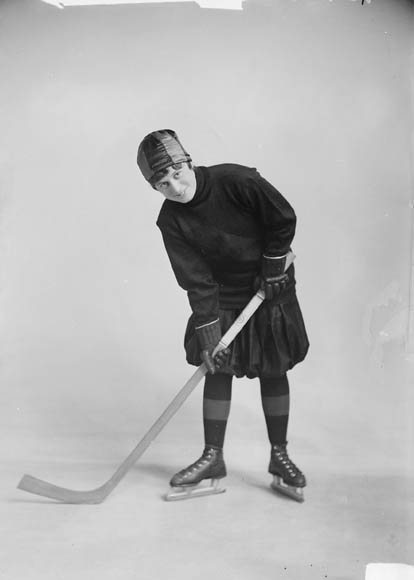
- Born: 11 October 1891 Aultsville, Ontario, Canada
- Died: 1984
- Playing career: 1915–1924?

Eva Catherine Ault (11 October 1891 – 1984) was a Canadian ice hockey player. Known as "Queen of the Ice", she is credited with helping to popularize women's ice hockey during the early 20th century.

== Biography ==
Eva Ault was born in Aultsville, Ontario, grew up in Finch, Ontario and later moved to Ottawa with her family.

She joined the Ottawa Alerts, a team formed in 1915; its members came from the Ottawa Ladies' College and the local YWCA. In 1916, the Alerts defeated the Pittsburgh Ladies Club three times in one day and then defeated the Toronto club the following day. The Alerts were defeated in the Canadian championship later that year, losing to the Cornwall Victorias. The Alerts defeated the Pittsburgh Polar Maids in 1917 to become world champions. The team also won the Canadian championship in the 1922/1923 season.

Ault served as vice-president of the Ladies Ontario Hockey Association in 1924 and 1925.

After retiring from hockey, she volunteered with the Minto Skating Club.

She married James Buels, who played for the Ottawa Rough Riders football team.

Ault died in 1984 at the age of 93 and was buried in Beechwood Cemetery.

Her story was featured in an episode of the CBC television documentary Hockey: A People's History.
