= Royal Military College of Canada Bands =

Band program

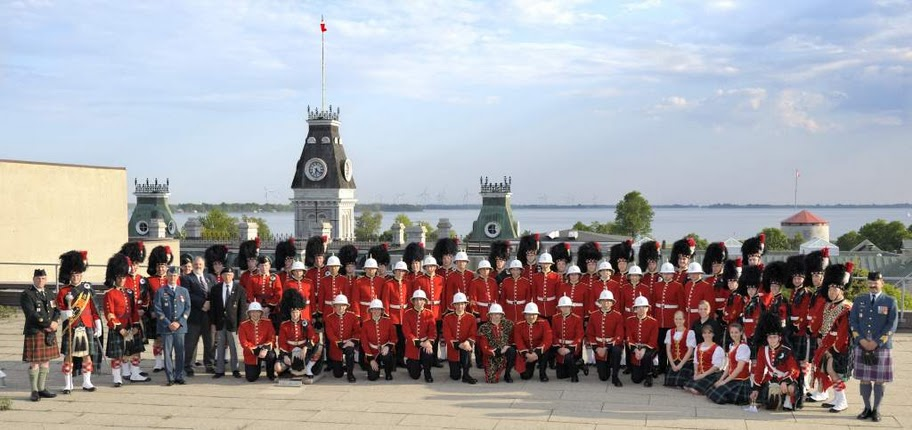
- School: Royal Military College of Canada
- Location: Kingston, Ontario
- Conference: Ontario University Athletics
- Founded: 1953
- Director: WO Aldwin Albino (Band Officer)
- Members: 105
- Fight song: "Precision (march)"
- Website: RMC Bands

The Royal Military College of Canada Bands (also known as the RMC Band) is the official group of bands of the Royal Military College of Canada. The group is composed of four sections: the brass and reed, the pipes and drums, highland dancers, and choristers. Total band membership consists of 105 Officer Cadets from the college. Officer Cadets in the band practice three days a week in the morning on top of attending their individual full-time university programs.

The RMC Band plays an active role in the college by providing the music for all parades and military functions, as well as athletic games and student events on the campus. In addition, the band has played provincially and nationally including the Oktoberfest celebration and parade in Kitchener-Waterloo and the Vanier Cup at Toronto's Skydome.

The Band has also played in venues across North America including the United States Military Academy, the United States Naval Academy, the United States Air Force Academy, Disney World, and the Canadian Embassy in Washington D.C.

As the largest volunteer band in the Canadian Forces, the RMC Band receives its instruction from professional military musicians. The current director of the RMC Band is Warrant Officer Aldwin Albino.

Notable alumni include John de Chastelain.

== History ==
=== Early years ===
The RMC Band was first established in 1953 as a pipe and drum band with the addition of trumpets and bugles. While a band with full brass and woodwind instrumentation was initially desired, there was an insufficient number of cadet musicians and so it was decided to pursue a smaller ensemble. Staff member Sgt. Paquin was added to help the formation of the early band.

In December 1952, the necessary equipment arrived at the college and the first public appearance of the Royal Military College of Canada Pipes and Drums took place in both RMC gymnasiums at the Sports Night in January 1953. Notable events this year include the band playing music in the Stone Frigate at reveille, leading the Cadet Wing during the college's annual Church parade, playing at sporting events and playing at the final ceremonial parade of the year.

In 1954, the band was devoted mainly to reorganization, rebuilding and practice in the drafting room and Kingston Armouries under the direction of C.F.L. Hewitt. Through the Staff Advisor, Captain Botting, the band was permitted sufficient time for practices. Since the experience and talent of the founding cadets was lost to the band through graduation, half of this year's band were playing for the first time.

More musicians were added this year to help increase the band size. Royal Roads Military College provided RMC with four pipers and a drummer while Royal Military College Saint-Jean provided a piper. Following Hewitt's policy of "a good band, or no band at all", the band's first public performance was not made until a high degree of proficiency had been reached when they provided half-time entertainment at a sports night in January 1955. The band played relatively simple tunes such as 'Scotland the Brave'. The band continued to lead for the college's church parades.

In 1956, the Pipe Band was authorized for the college and was under process of formation and training being guided by the padre, Major Jack Armstrong. Sgt. Mackenzie and Sgt. Blackely. Major-This year marked the return of the pillbox hats and the first appearance of the RMC pipe band on a ceremonial parade. The band performed at three ceremonial parades in the first term and at many of the football games, several hockey games and the West Point hockey game.

=== 1960s ===
The band performed for the first time at the Graduation Parade in 1961, albeit in a secondary role to the Royal Canadian Signals Band. The following year, the RMC Glee Club, the University of Toronto Glee Club and Syracuse University Glee Club performed a joint concert at Hart House.

In 1963, the band established its Robbie Burns dinner as an annual event in honour of the Scottish poet Robert Burns. This year the Pipes and Drums travelled to Ottawa with the football team to perform during the half time show.

In 1964, the RMC band performed at Sunday morning church parades and performed during the halftime at the Carleton University football weekend in Ottawa. During the winter term, the band performed the Tattoo Ceremony for West Point Weekend. The RMC band and the Royal Canadian Corps of Signals Band performed music for the graduation parade.

Under Jim Taylor's leadership, the cadet dance bands were recognized as official College organizations under the Recreation Club. Before 1965, the band uniform consisted of scarlet tunic with RMC pants, gaitors and pillbox hat.

During this time, the RMC Pipes and Drums played at the 52nd Grey Cup and 53rd Grey Cup, at Exhibition Stadium in Toronto.

=== 1970s ===
The bands were fully recognized by the Canadian Forces in 1970. Thanks to the efforts of Leonard Birchall and George F.G. Stanley, the RMC pipes and drums began wearing the Mackenzie tartan but continued to wear the pillbox hat. The feather bonnet came in 1970.

The Pipes and Drums competed for the first time in 1971. RMC came in 3rd at the Niagara Wine and Grape Festival Band Competition. John de Chastelain joined in playing the pipes when the Band performed at the US Air Force Academy in Colorado Springs and at USMA in West Point.

=== 1980s to present day ===
In 1979 and 1988, the RMC Pipes and Drums performed at Royal Agricultural Winter Fair, at Exhibition Place, Toronto. The Pipes and Drums performed at the Air Canada Silver Broom International Curling Championships. The entire band first played in the KW Oktoberfest Parade in October 1983, staying the weekend in Ayr, Ontario.

The Pipes and Drums performed during the Olympic torch lighting ceremony in 1988 for the XV Olympic Winter Games held in Calgary, Alberta. That same year, the RMC Pipes and Drums played at the 76th Grey Cup at Frank Claire Stadium in Ottawa.

== Organization ==
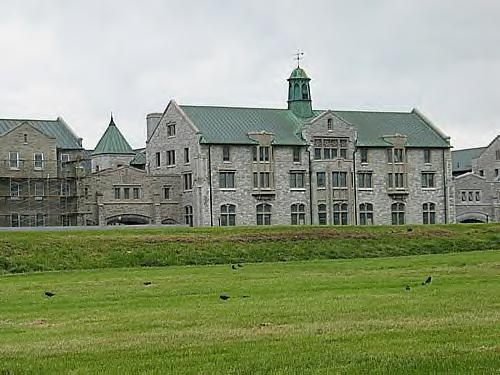
Royal Military College of Canada, Yeo Hall

The groups that make up the RMC Band, is based out of Yeo Hall on the RMC campus. The band is led by a cadet drum major and pipe major.

The Pipe and Drum sections and Brass and Reed section are both authorized Canadian Regular Force voluntary bands.

=== Composition and membership ===
The band membership is broken up into distinct sections:

- Brass and Reeds (40 musicians)
- Pipes and Drums (25 pipers and 25 drummers)
- Highland dance (20 dancers)
- Choir (20 singers)
- Stage band (15-20)

The bands also include the RMC mascot, a Paladin.

The band is a volunteer organization, which consists of undergraduate students and graduate students. RMC Band alumni are allowed to play with the current ensembles and will occasionally join at practices, performances and competitions.

Band members typically come from a wide range of musical backgrounds, some with very little musical training before joining. Students are provided musical instruction in bagpiping, highland drumming (snare, tenor and bass), and highland dance.

== Performances ==
Notable RMC Band performances include:

- Toronto Santa Claus Parade
- Kitchener-Waterloo Oktoberfest Thanksgiving Day Parade.
- Various St. Patrick's Day parades
- Annual exchanges with United States Military Academy and United States Naval Academy
- Concert in Scarlets

The primary role for the bands was to play music during all formal parades throughout the year, as well as support performances at mess dinners (for each squadron each year, which eventually transitioned to Element mess dinners for Army, Navy, Air Force instead. Some of the best remembered performances for the Pipes and Drums was a show put on at the Christmas Ball and Grad Ball each year.

Starting in 1997, The RMC band conducted annual concerts in a different city in Canada, increasing public awareness of RMC and its talented musicians. This series of concerts continued until at least 2001 but eventually ceased as an annual event.

- 1998 – Victoria, British Columbia
- 1999 – St Johns, Newfoundland
- 2000 – Winnipeg, Manitoba
- 2001 – Quebec City, Quebec

While sports teams enjoyed hosting or visiting West Point and USNA, the band was always present, organizing exchange visits where often the RMC band members conducted workshops to help develop the bands from those schools as well as perform at the annual Westpoint/RMC hockey game.

They are also active during Royal Military College of Canada Start of Year weekend, playing while officer cadets march through the Memorial Arch. The bands performs at military ceremonies such as the Battle of Britain and Remembrance Day at the college and in local churches. During parade inspections, the Pipe circle, the Drumline and the Brass and Reeds perform separately.

=== Athletic events ===
For home games, the Bands lead a parade of Royal Military College of Canada fans from the main campus to the football stadium at Queen's University.

==== Cheer Band ====
The Cheer Band is a subsidiary of the Brass and Reed section, and performs music indoor RMC sporting events, such as the Carr-Harris Cup against Queen's University and the Westpoint Weekend. Wearing Paladins jerseys, the band entertained a record 3,122 fans during the annual RMC vs Queens Carr-Harris Cup at the K-Rock Centre in January 2012.

=== Television and media events ===
The Glee Club performed on television on the CBC's Timmy Parade of Stars show, sponsored annually by the Easter Seals campaign; This program originated from Toronto's Maple Leaf Gardens on 26 March, and was telecast on the nationwide network.

The bands performed Trooper's "Raise A Little Hell" when Rick Mercer Report filmed a segment called "Learning the ropes at the Royal Military College" which appeared in January 2005 on the CBC.

The Aboriginal Leadership Opportunity Year cadets at the Royal Military College of Canada performed on the drums at the opening of the annual Canadian Aboriginal Music Awards in 2010.

Various RMC Band performances

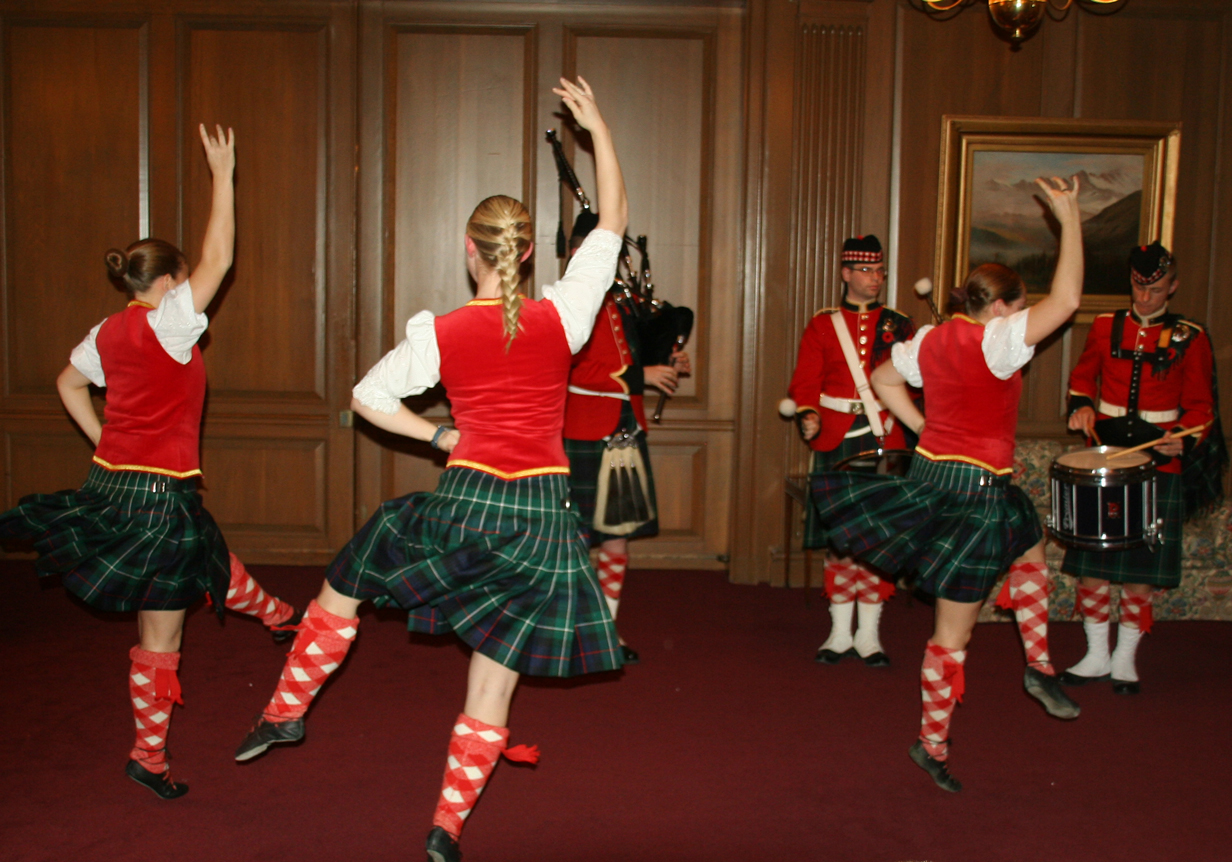
Royal Military College of Canada Scottish Highland Dancers, piper, drummers

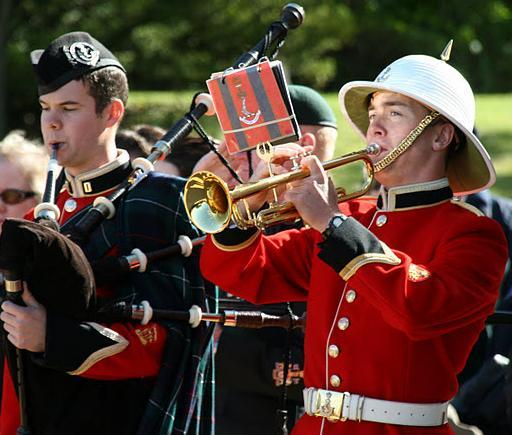
Royal Military College of Canada bag piper and bugler.

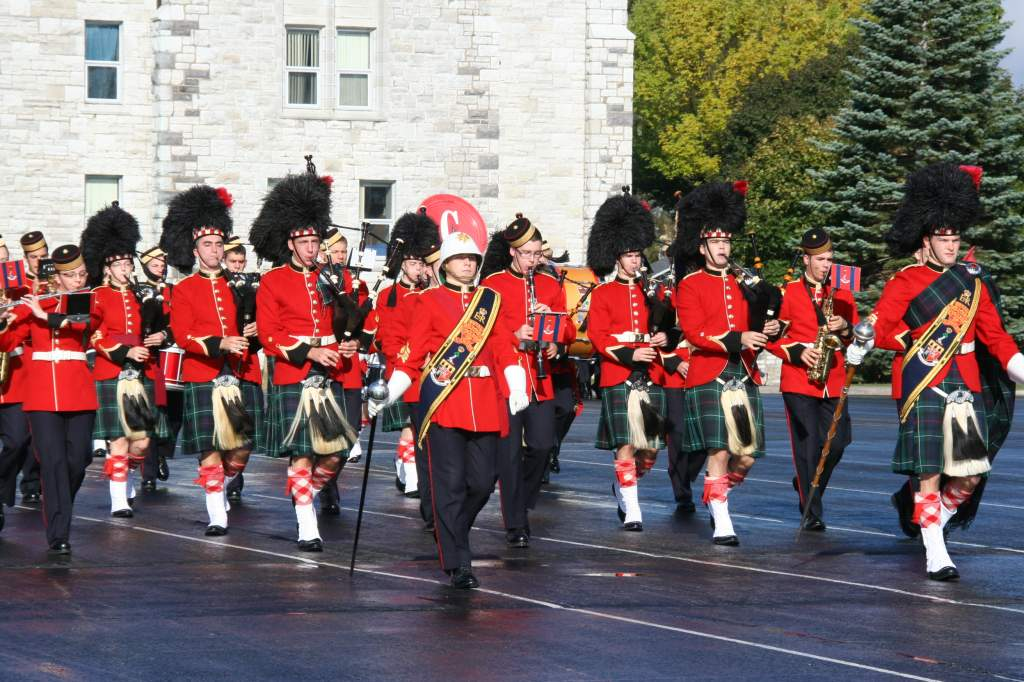
Massed band, Royal Military College of Canada

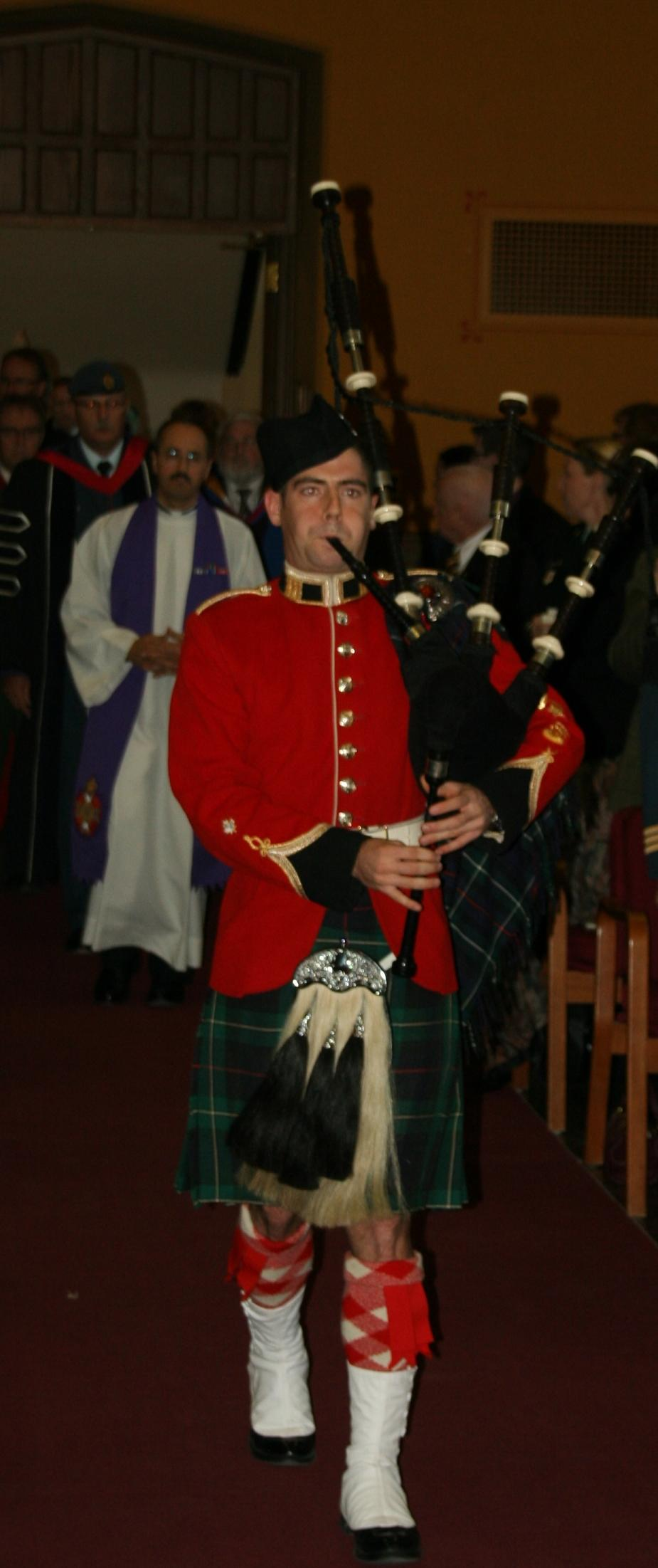
Bag piper

== Traditions ==
During the RMC Reunion Week-End, the bands perform at the Badging parade in honour of new cadets and the Old brigade parade held at the Arch in honour of RMC ex-cadets who died while in the service.

The bands play "funny" music and wear costumes during the annual gash parade, which is a practice for annual Sunset Ceremony in May. The musicians are known for playing skylarks (practical jokes) on each other.

The Bands perform pre-game and half-time shows at Royal Military College of Canada games, such as the Carr-Harris Cup annual challenge match varsity hockey game held at Kingston Memorial Centre and lead the crowd in singing the RMC cheer: "Call: Gimme a beer! Response: Beer! Esses! Emma! T-D-V! Who can stop old RMC! Shrapnel, Cordite, NCT! R-M-C Hooah!"

To celebrate the 60th anniversary for the RMC Band, the band was presented in 2013 with artwork displaying a lone RMC piper and a RMC bugler (he's actually playing a trumpet) playing last post, kilt pins featuring the RMC logo, and a drum skin featuring the RMC logo.

== Uniform ==
The female highland dancers wear Scottish dress consisting of a velvet jacket with gold or silver braid edging and gold or silver buttons, over a white shirt with lace ruffles at the neck. They wear a kilt and tartan hose, and black laced ghillies, or dancing shoes. The male highland dancers wear the kilt, sporran, or pouch, jacket, bonnet, tartan hose and a sgian dubh, or ceremonial knife. The members of the pipes and drums wear scarlet tunics, trousers or a kilt, shoes and a feather bonnet or Glengarry cap. The members of the brass and reed ear scarlet tunics, trousers, shoes, Wolseley helmet or pillbox hat on parade. Attached to the bass drone of the Scottish Highland bagpipes, the pipe banner is a two-sided, swallow-tailed flag with the RMC badge on the obverse side and the CMR de St-Jean badge and the donor's college number on the reverse. The Banner is fringed along the outer edges with gold wire and both badges are embroidered in gold and silver wire and coloured threads.

=== Badges ===
The brass or gold thread lyre is awarded as a proficiency badge for brass and reed by the Band Officer when a student is considered capable of participating in parades. A brass or gold treble clef is awarded by the Band Officer as a proficiency badge for choir when a student is considered to be ready for concerts. A brass or gold thread pipe is awarded by the Band Officer as a proficiency badge for pipes when a student is considered capable of participating in parades. A brass or gold thread drum is awarded as a proficiency badge for drums by the Band Officer when a student is considered capable of participating in parades. The brass or gold thread thistle is awarded by the Band Officer as a proficiency badge for highland dance when a student is considered capable of participating in parades.

RMC Band uniform pieces

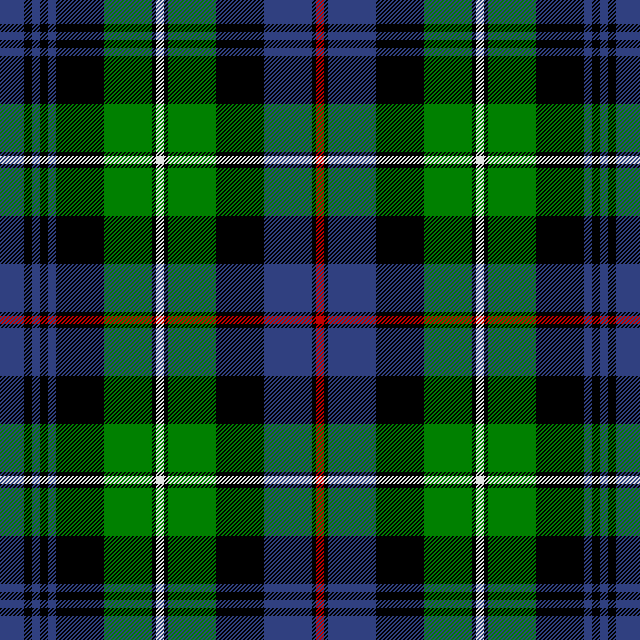
RMC Pipes and Drums and Highland dancers wear the Mackenzie (and Seaforth Highlander) tartan.

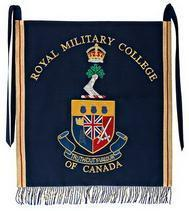
Royal Military College of Canada trumpet banner.

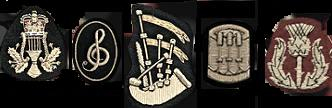
Various RMC Band badges.

== Repertoire ==
=== Music written about RMC ===
The bands currently play many songs written about the school. This includes the official march of the college, "Precision". As well, the Pipes and Drums play "Alexander Mackenzie", the official slow pipe march of the Royal Military College of Canada.

Other music written about the school that the bands play are "RMC cheer", "Fight the Good Fight (college hymn)" by John Monsell and William Boyd, "The RMC march & two step" and "The R.M.C. waltzes".

=== Highland dance music ===
The Highland Dancers perform Scottish highland dance and Irish stepdance to various standard songs such as "Wilt thou go to the barracks, Johnny?", "Highland Laddie", "The Irish Washerwoman", "Flora MacDonald's Fancy" and "The Sailor's Hornpipe".

=== Popular music and jazz ===
During the annual Christmas and spring concerts, the band played diverse pieces of classical, jazz, film scores, pop music and traditional music.

== Recordings and albums ==
Various recordings of the RMC Band exist. These include:

- Royal Military College of Canada Glee Club (1955) The RMC Glee Club is accompanied on the album by the Central Royal Canadian Air Force Training Command Band.
- Royal Military College of Canada Pipe Band (1961) 12" LP disc
- The Sound of Scarlet: Royal Military College of Canada (c.1969) 12" LP disc
- Royal Military College of Canada 1876-Centennial-1976 (1976) A 12" LP disc
- The Royal Military College Pipes and Drums, Brass and Chorus
- The RMC Band La musique du CMR (1996) [CD]

== See also ==
- Military history of Canada
- History of the Canadian Army
- Canadian Forces
- Royal Roads Military College Band
- West Point Band
- The Band of the Royal Military College, Duntroon
