= Mark Potter (sportscaster) =

Canadian sports broadcaster (born 1960)

Mark Potter is a Canadian sports broadcaster. Potter has worked on both hockey and baseball broadcasts on TV and radio, spanning four decades.

Potter began his career as a radio announcer at CKWS/CFMK radio in the late 1970s after graduating from Loyalist College in Belleville, Ontario from the Broadcast Journalism program. He anchored TV sports in Kingston starting at the age of twenty; the youngest anchor in the history of CKWS-TV, a station that goes back to the mid-1950s. His sports broadcasting career began in 1981 when he replaced Chris Cuthbert (who moved on to TSN) as the colour man for Jim Gilchrist on Kingston Canadians Ontario Hockey League radio broadcasts for seven seasons. Potter began his television career in 1981 at CKWS-TV in Kingston, Ontario, working alongside the legendary Max Jackson (member of the Kingston & District Sports Hall of Fame). Max retired in 1982, and Potter became Sports Director at CKWS TV & Radio. He anchored the nightly sports reports on the six o'clock and 11 o'clock evening newscasts on CKWS-TV for eleven years. He built a reputation as a colourful, outspoken commentator, and his favourite target was the hapless Toronto Maple Leafs teams of that era.

Potter left CKWS in 1992 to start a new career as an Investment Advisor, but has continued working as a freelance broadcaster with TVCogeco in Kingston. He hosted a weekly one-hour local sports interview show called 'SportsMark'. It ran for five years, and after a brief hiatus, he returned hosting a weekly 30-minute sports interview program called 'Sports Profiles'.

Potter has been the TV play-by-play voice of the Kingston Ponies Senior baseball team on TVCogeco since the late 1980s, and for the past ten years has hosted Kingston Frontenacs OHL broadcasts on TVCogeco. In addition, he hosts a weekly OHL intermission feature called 'The OHL Roundtable" that is shown in several OHL cities. Potter also does radio work as the occasional co-host of the 'Big G & Mathews' morning drive show on KIX Country 93.5fm in Kingston. In 2005, he won a prestigious TVCogeco STAR Award for being named the top broadcaster in Ontario for Cogeco stations.

A dedicated longtime community volunteer, Potter has been a finalist for Kingston's Citizen of the Year award and a recipient of the Paul Harris Fellow, the highest honour given by Rotary International for community service. He is in his tenth year as President of the International Hockey Hall of Fame in Kingston, Ontario, Canada, and has been on the Board of Directors since the early 1980s. In 2003, he co-authored a book with Bill Fitsell titled "Hockey's Hub-Three Centuries of Hockey in Kingston" (published by Quarry Press) that chronicles Kingston's rich hockey heritage.

Potter has done the play by play for Kingston's annual Historic Hockey Series for over 25-years, has been a regular featured commentator at Kingston's annual Feb Fest Limestone NHL Classic, was for several years the race announcer for the annual Kingston Triathlon, ring announcer for the Kingston Youth Boxing Club and has served on the board of directors of the Kingston And District Sports Hall of Fame.
