= James T. Sutherland =

Canadian ice hockey executive (1870–1955)

Captain James T. Sutherland
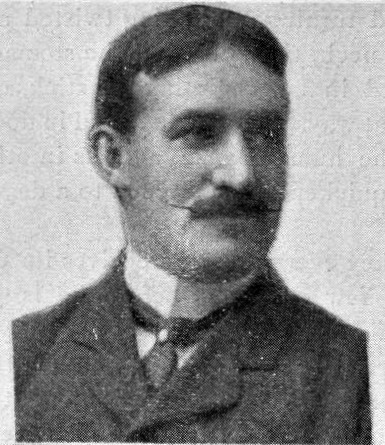
- Born: October 10, 1870; Kingston, Ontario, Canada
- Died: September 16, 1955 (aged 84); Kingston, Ontario, Canada
- Resting place: Cataraqui Cemetery
- Occupations: Soldier & salesman
- Organization(s): OHA & CAHA
- Known for: Ice hockey executive; Memorial Cup; Sutherland Cup; Hockey Hall of Fame; International HHOF
- Military career
- Allegiance: Canada
- Branch: Canadian Expeditionary Force
- Service years: 1887–1904, 1916–1918
- Rank: Captain
- Conflicts: World War I

James Thomas Sutherland (October 10, 1870 – September 16, 1955) was a Canadian ice hockey administrator, and founding father of the game in Canada. Sutherland was a pioneer of hockey's early years, helping to develop amateur hockey, and spread the game's popularity throughout the country, and into the United States. He played in the inaugural season of the Ontario Hockey Association, and later coached and refereed the game. He founded the original Kingston Frontenacs, and later became president of the Ontario Hockey Association, and then the Canadian Amateur Hockey Association. He was instrumental in founding the Memorial Cup in 1919, and was at the forefront of the discussion on the origins of hockey.

Sutherland was born into a military family, and was a travelling shoe salesman by trade. He served overseas in the Canadian Expeditionary Force during World War I, reaching the rank of Captain. Sutherland was the driving force behind the creation of the Hall of Fame, and later the International Hockey Hall of Fame. His many writings helped preserve the history of ice hockey in Canada, and his arguments for Kingston being the birthplace of hockey were a major reason why the National Hockey League and the Canadian Amateur Hockey Association selected Kingston as the original home of the Hockey Hall of Fame. He was one of the original inductees into the Hockey Hall of Fame, and often referred to as the "Father of Hockey".

== Early life ==
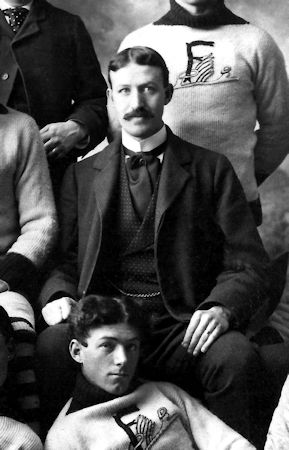
Sutherland coached the Kingston Frontenacs team in 1899, that won the J. Ross Robertson Cup as champions of the OHA's intermediate division.

James Thomas Sutherland was born on October 10, 1870, in Kingston, Ontario, as the youngest of eight children, to Alexander and Margaret Sutherland, who had Scottish and Irish roots. The family owned a custom shoemaking business at the lower end of Princess Street, that made boots for troops at Fort Henry. At age 15, Sutherland attempted to follow his father's military footsteps, and volunteered for service with the Midand Regiment for the North-West Rebellion, but was rejected for being too young. Sutherland attended Kingston Collegiate and Vocational Institute, and later became a bookkeeper for a family-owned hardware store. He was accepted for military service into Kingston's 14th Regiment two years later in 1887. He was cast as chorus member in the opera, Leo, the Royal Cadet. at age 20, and his father died two years later, in 1892.

He grew up playing hockey on the frozen Cataraqui River in downtown Kingston. Sutherland witnessed the first recorded hockey game in Canada, on March 10, 1886, between Queen's University and the Royal Military College of Canada. Sutherland was one of hockey's first captains, and he played as a defenceman for the Athletic Club of Kingston in winter of 1890–91, during the inaugural season of the Ontario Hockey Association.

In 1897, Sutherland married Ethel Mary Metcalfe, and helped organize the Frontenac Hockey Club of Kingston. He no longer played, but was involved with the club as a referee, timekeeper, manager, and coach. Sutherland was first inspired to provide his own views on how hockey began, after reading the 1899 book Hockey: Canada's Royal Winter Game. In 1902–03, he was appointed a convenor for the eastern group of the Ontario Hockey Association. In 1904, he resigned as a commissioned lieutenant officer, then began refereeing ice hockey throughout Ontario, and travelled as a shoe salesman as far as Florida and Georgia.

Sutherland coached the Frontenac team which included future Hall of Famers Scotty Davidson, and George Richardson, that won OHA junior championships in 1910, and 1911. In 1911, he was appointed to the OHA executive, and passed a rule change where the positions of point, and cover-point were changed to right and left defence. Sutherland was also credited with further rule changes to allow substitutions, and to switch from two thirty-minute periods, to three twenty-minute periods. He became second vice president of the OHA in 1913, and then its first vice president in 1914.

== Wartime leadership ==
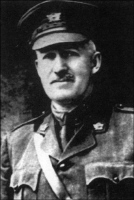
Captain Sutherland in military uniform with the Canadian Expeditionary Forces, circa World War I

Sutherland was elected president of the Ontario Hockey Association in 1915, and was later elected president of the Canadian Amateur Hockey Association on December 10, 1915, to succeed W. F. Taylor of Winnipeg. Sutherland then appointed OHA secretary W. A. Hewitt, as the CAHA secretary. In 1916, Sutherland enlisted for the World War I effort with the Canadian Army Service Corps, and later rejoined Kingston's 14th Regiment after a 12-year absence.

World War I — A call to arms

I feel that I have a greater responsibility and duty to perform at this time and that is to point out to the great army of hockey players and officials scattered throughout our beloved Canada, how great and urgent the need is for men to come forward and rally to the defence of our common cause and strike a blow for liberty and justice. It takes nerves and gameness to play the game of hockey. The same qualities are necessary in the greater game that is now being played in France and on the other fighting fronts." "With every man doing his bit, Canada will raise an army of brain and brawn from our hockey enthusiasts the likes of which the world has never seen. The whistle has sounded. Let every man play the greatest game of his life.

— Captain Sutherland, 1916

Sutherland encouraged Canadian hockey players to join the war effort, and used his position with the CAHA to issue a recruiting message across the nation. He promoted the teamwork of hockey, and compared it to war against a common enemy.

Sutherland deployed to Europe in 1916, as a captain in the 146th Battalion in the Canadian Expeditionary Force. His battalion was later absorbed into the 95th battalion, and he was reelected OHA president for another year, while serving overseas as quartermaster of the Casualty Training Battalion.

The OHA elected a new president in 1917, however the CAHA did not hold elections from 1916 to 1918 during the war. While overseas due to WW I, J. F. Paxton acted as CAHA president, until Sutherland's return in 1918. Sutherland was in Paris on Armistice Day, and made sure to visit the grave of George Richardson, before he returned to Canada, the CAHA, and the Frontenacs after the war.

== After the war ==
Sutherland's idea to remember fallen soldiers in World War I became the Memorial Cup.

Sutherland continued to serve as CAHA president until 1919, when succeeded by Frederick E. Betts. He was known as an authoritative source for information on the history of hockey, refereeing, and introduced preseason exercises, and a coaching system. He worked to create a trophy to honour all of the soldiers who died during World War I, many of whom played junior hockey, and responded to Sutherland's call to arms. The deaths of two former Frontenacs, Scotty Davidson, and George Richardson served as inspiration for the trophy. Sutherland, with the help of businessman Liam Carr purchased a trophy, which was donated by the Ontario Hockey Association. The Memorial Cup was originally known as the OHA Memorial Cup, and was first awarded in 1919 to the best junior hockey team in Canada each year.

Sutherland served as a long-time member of the OHA executive committee after being president. He recommended rule changes in the amateur levels to improve player safety, and spoke in support of the ban against bodychecking in junior ice hockey. He also spoke against having paid coaches, but rather to keep amateur status. Likewise he discouraged having players with future professional contracts in the OHA. He helped establish the annual West Point Weekend exhibition match between the Royal Military College of Canada at Kingston, and the United States Military Academy at West Point in 1923.

== Birthplace of hockey ==
The "Origin of Hockey" report

Historians are said to differ considerably on the place in which the great Caesar first saw "the light of day," and similarly in respect to the birthplace of Canada's national winter sport, Hockey. There may be some who will claim sundry and divers places as being the authentic spot or locality. Whatever measure of merit the claim of other places may have, I think it is generally admitted and has been substantially proven on many former occasions that the actual birthplace of organized hockey is the city of Kingston, in the year 1888 (actually 1886). The first actual game that we have any record of occurred in Capt. Dix's rink, which was located on the harbour in front of the city buildings, Kingston. This game was played between teams representing Queen's University and the Royal Military College.

— Captain Sutherland, 1942

Sutherland spent much of his retirement campaigning for Kingston to be recognized as the birthplace of hockey, and its rightful place in history as for the early development of the game. He published an article in the Canadian Hockey Yearbook in 1924, which first established the claim. He followed up with a full-page 1925 article in the Whig titled, "Hockey Heroes of Former Days Made Game Famous in Kingston". A 1926 article in Maclean's titled, "A six letter word meaning the best game in the word", cited Sutherland as the father of hockey. He published another full-page article in the Whig in 1928, entitled "Kingston–The Birthplace of Hockey". Sutherland's claims were disputed by other places in Canada, including Montreal, Quebec, two cities in Nova Scotia, and Deline, Northwest Territories. His claim for the birthplace of hockey was based on a report of a game played on Christmas Day, 1855, in Kingston Harbour, which predated the 1886 match between Queen's University and the Royal Military College. When the National Baseball Hall of Fame and Museum opened in 1939, the argument over the birthplace of hockey intensified to become a battle to create a similar institution for hockey where the game originated.

In 1941, the Canadian Amateur Hockey Association appointed a committee to write a history of hockey in Canada, led by Sutherland, including W. A. Hewitt and George Slater. In 1943, the committee concluded that hockey had been played in Canada since 1855, and that Kingston and Halifax had equal claims to be the birthplace of hockey, since both cities hosted games played by the Royal Canadian Rifle Regiment. The report also stated that Kingston had the first recognized hockey league in 1885, which merged into the Ontario Hockey Association in 1890.

In 1943, The Canadian Amateur Hockey Association accepted Sutherland's claim that Kingston was the birthplace of hockey. Despite the approval at the time, Sutherland's claim was later dismissed with further research. He had claimed that Kingston was home to Canada's first league, however Kingston did not have a league until the formation of the OHA in 1890–91, and the Amateur Hockey Association of Canada was formed earlier in Montreal, in December 1886. Scholars have agreed instead that Kingston, Sutherland, and the OHA, played an important role in developing hockey from Montreal, westward into Ontario, and southward into the United States.

== Hockey Hall of Fame ==
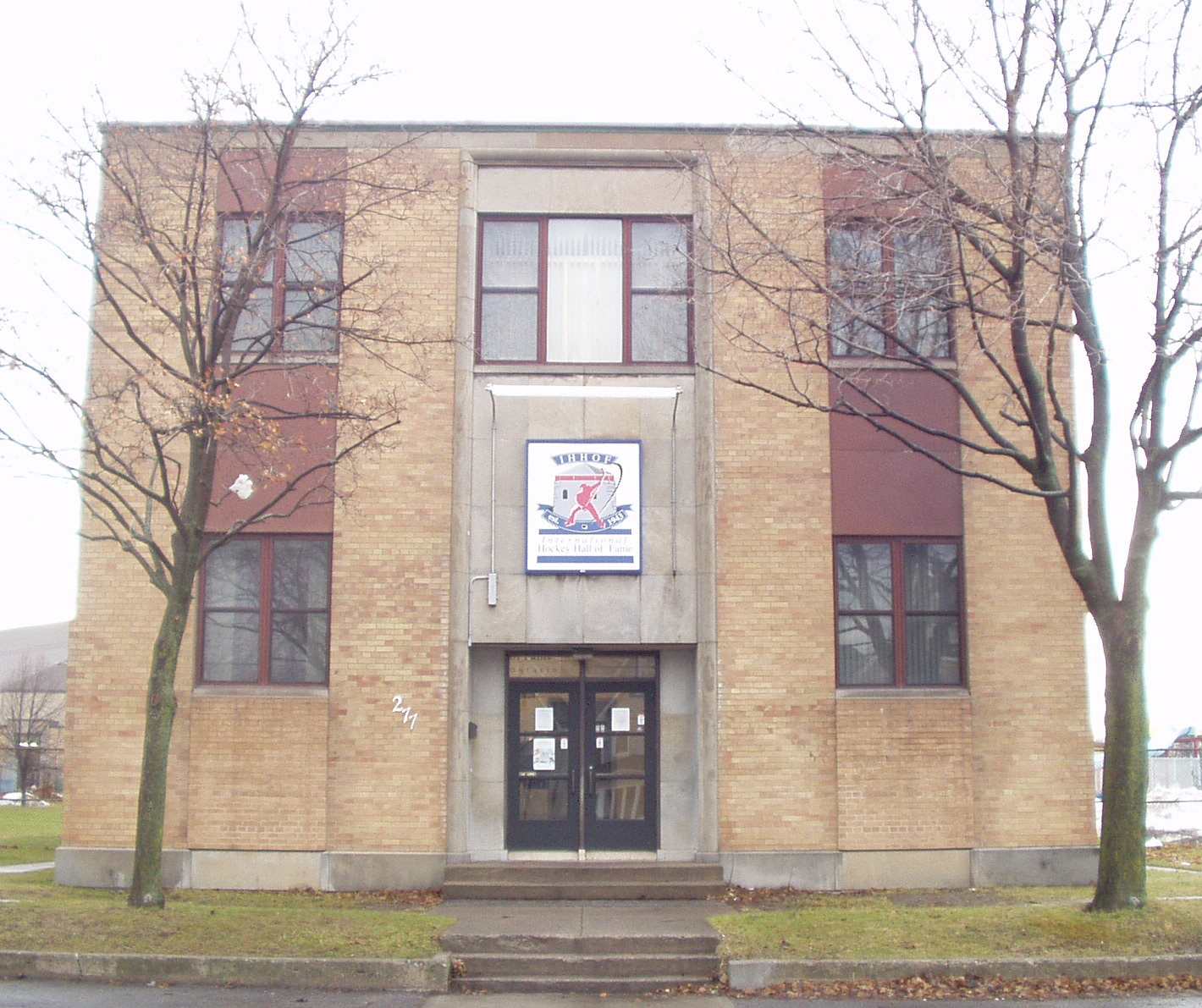
The International Hockey Hall of Fame in Kingston

The National Hockey League endorsed the establishment of a Hockey Hall of Fame in Kingston, on September 10, 1943. The CAHA followed suit on September 20, 1943. Sutherland began a local committee for planning the Hall of Fame, raised funds, and convinced the CAHA and the NHL to contribute money. The Hall of Fame inducted its first members 1945. Sutherland desired "to perpetuate the memories of the men who have done so much to develop nationally and internationally Canada's great winter sport." The Hall of Fame was originally planned to be located inside the Kingston City Hall, due to wartime restrictions on new buildings, and then later expected to be part of a new community arena, which became the Kingston Memorial Centre.

Sutherland donated $1,000 of his own, and raised more with the help of Kingston's Mayor Crawford, but due to World War II, fundraising was slow and difficult. The planning committee was beset by disagreements with the NHL over the proposed site for the hall, and the soaring construction costs. Other interests lobbied to relocate the Hall of Fame, and by 1955 the NHL withdrew financial support for Kingston's plans, and approved a site at the Canadian National Exhibition place in Toronto. Despite the loss of NHL backing, the Kingston committee went ahead with planning an International Hockey Hall of Fame, using the monies and memorabilia donated, since the funds collected by the incorporation could only be legally used to build a shrine in the Kingston vicinity.

== Death and legacy ==
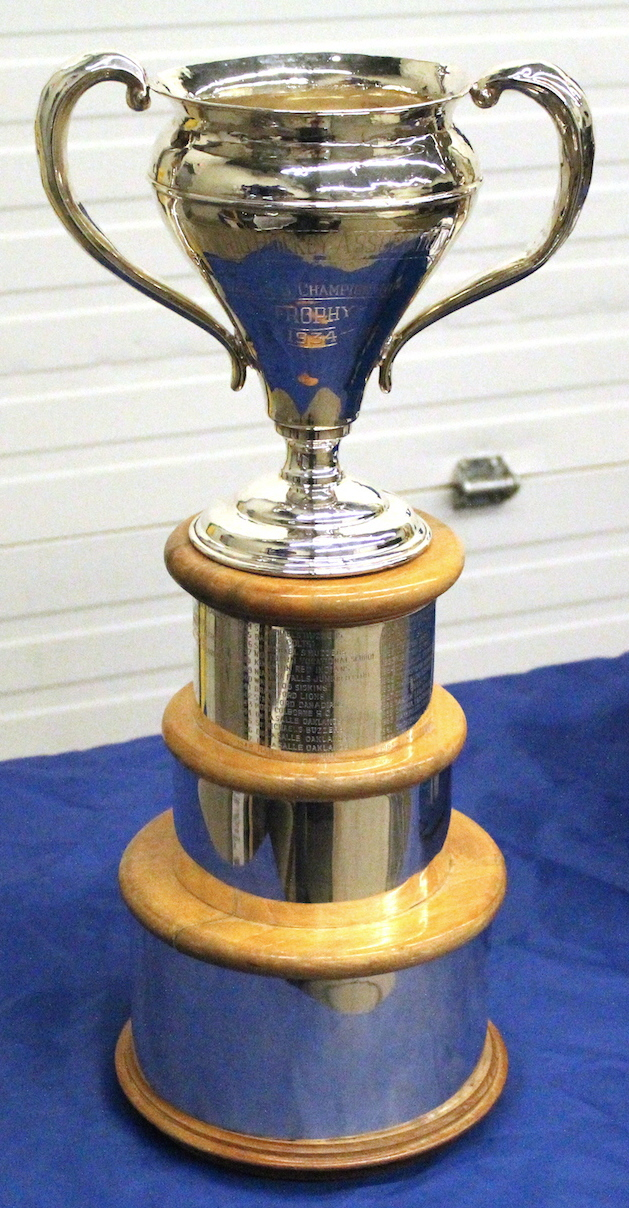
The Sutherland Cup

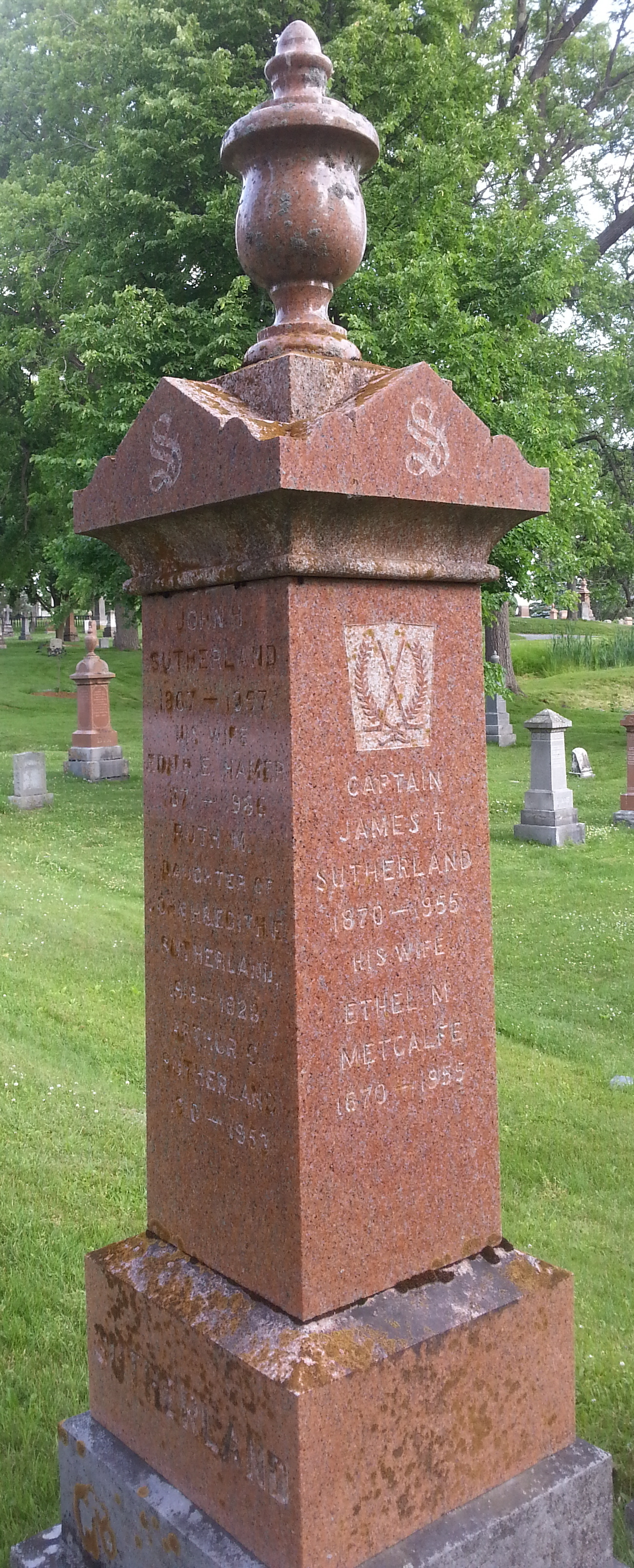
Sutherland's grave stone

Sutherland died on September 16, 1955, and his wife died nine days later. His funeral was eulogized by local authorities, and NHL officials. The Sutherlands were interred at Cataraqui Cemetery, about 50 feet from Canada's first prime minister, Sir John A. Macdonald. Their gravestone is inscribed with crossed hockey sticks, used as the original logo of Hockey Hall of Fame.

Sutherland was made a life member of the CAHA in 1928, the highest honour which may be bestowed by the organization. He was made a lifetime member of the OHA in 1931. The Sutherland Cup was dedicated in his honour in 1934, and awarded to the Junior B champions of the OHA. In 1943, he was presented with a Gordon Medal as a life member of the OHA and CAHA, and for 60 years of involvement in hockey. He was among the first group in 1947, to receive the OHA Gold Stick order of merit.

Sutherland was inducted into the Hockey Hall of Fame as builder, in the first class of 1945. He was also inducted into the International Hockey Hall of Fame in 1947. The Hall of Fame which he founded finally opened in Toronto on August 26, 1961, followed by the Kingston Hall of Fame which opened on July 29, 1965. Sutherland's extensive collection of hockey memorabilia was donated to the IHHOF, and displayed in a hall named for him.

Sutherland was the subject of the book, Captain James T. Sutherland: The Grand Old Man of Hockey & The Battle for the Original Hockey Hall of Fame by Bill Fitsell, in 2012, and was the subject of the biography, "The Father of Hockey" by WJP Media in 2013.

== Bibliography ==
- Fitsell, J.W. (Bill) (2012). Captain James T. Sutherland: The Grand Old Man of Hockey & The Battle for the Original Hockey Hall of Fame. Kingston, Ontario: Quarry Heritage Books. ISBN 978-1-55082-374-5.
- Henderson, Paul; Prime, Jim (2011). How Hockey Explains Canada: The Sport That Defines a Country. Chicago, Illinois: Triumph Books. ISBN 978-1-60078-575-7.
- Brignall, Richard (2011). Forgotten Heroes: Winnipeg's Hockey Heritage. Winnipeg, Manitoba: J. Gordon Shillingford Publishing Inc. ISBN 978-1-897289-65-5.
- McKinley, Michael (2014). It's Our Game: Celebrating 100 Years Of Hockey Canada. Toronto, Ontario: Viking Press. ISBN 978-0-670-06817-3.
- Annual Report: Constitution, Regulations and Rules of Competition. Cambridge, Ontario: Ontario Hockey Association. June 17, 2006.
- Young, Scott (1989). 100 Years of Dropping the Puck. Toronto, Ontario: McClelland & Stewart. ISBN 0-7710-9093-5.
- Constitution, By-laws, Regulations, History. Gloucester, Ontario: Canadian Amateur Hockey Association. May 1990.
