= Bill Fitsell =

Canadian journalist, writer, and historian (1923–2020)

- Born: John Walter Fitsell; July 25, 1923; Barrie, Ontario, Canada
- Died: December 3, 2020 (aged 97); Kingston, Ontario, Canada
- Occupations: Journalist and writer
- Employer: The Kingston Whig-Standard
- Known for: Society for International Hockey Research, International Hockey Hall of Fame

John Walter "Bill" Fitsell (July 25, 1923 – December 3, 2020) was a Canadian journalist, writer and historian. He was a columnist for The Kingston Whig-Standard from 1961 to 1993, and was the founding president of the Society for International Hockey Research in 1991. He was involved with the International Hockey Hall of Fame from 1969 to 2005, serving as its curator and historian. He published five books during his career including four on the history of ice hockey, and helped organize the Historic Hockey Series to commemorate early ice hockey games played in Kingston, Ontario. He was inducted into both the Kingston and District Sports Hall of Fame and the Lindsay District Sports Hall of Fame, and received the 125th Anniversary of the Confederation of Canada Medal.

== Early life ==
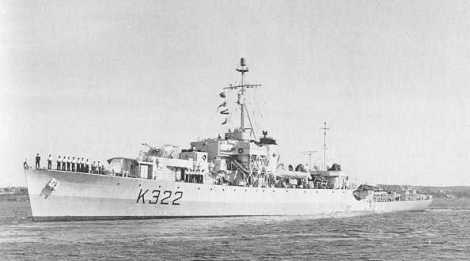
HMCS Outremont

John Walter Fitsell was born on July 25, 1923, in Barrie, Ontario, and moved with his family to Lindsay in 1927. He had three siblings, his father John Charles Fitsell was a baker, and his mother Beatrice Exell was a homemaker. The family home where he grew up included a large lot upon which an ice hockey rink was constructed each winter, where he and his friends played as youths.

Fitsell was a lifelong fan of the Toronto Maple Leafs and stated his favourite player was Charlie Conacher, since they both played as a right winger. The Maple Leafs played an exhibition game in Lindsay in 1935, and Fitsell introduced himself and his friends to the players as they exited the team's bus before the game. In the 1930s, Fitsell began a lifelong hobby of a scrapbook containing newspaper articles, photographs and other memorabilia related to the Maple Leafs. He attended his first National Hockey League game on January 18, 1936, watching the Maple Leafs play the Boston Bruins at Maple Leaf Gardens.

Fitsell attended high school at Lindsay Collegiate and Vocational Institute. At age 17, he joined the Navy Cadets and departed for Victoria, British Columbia. He later joined the Royal Canadian Naval Volunteer Reserve in 1942. He played hockey while stationed in Halifax with the navy during World War II. He initially served aboard HMCS St. Francis, then was transferred to HMCS Outremont. He was a ship's writer and assisted the captains with correspondence and paying the crews. During the Normandy landings in 1944, Outremont protected the western end of the English Channel from enemy submarines. He courted Barbara Robson on Cape Breton Island after the war, and they married in 1945. He was discharged from naval service in 1946 and they settled in Lindsay.

== Journalist and historian ==
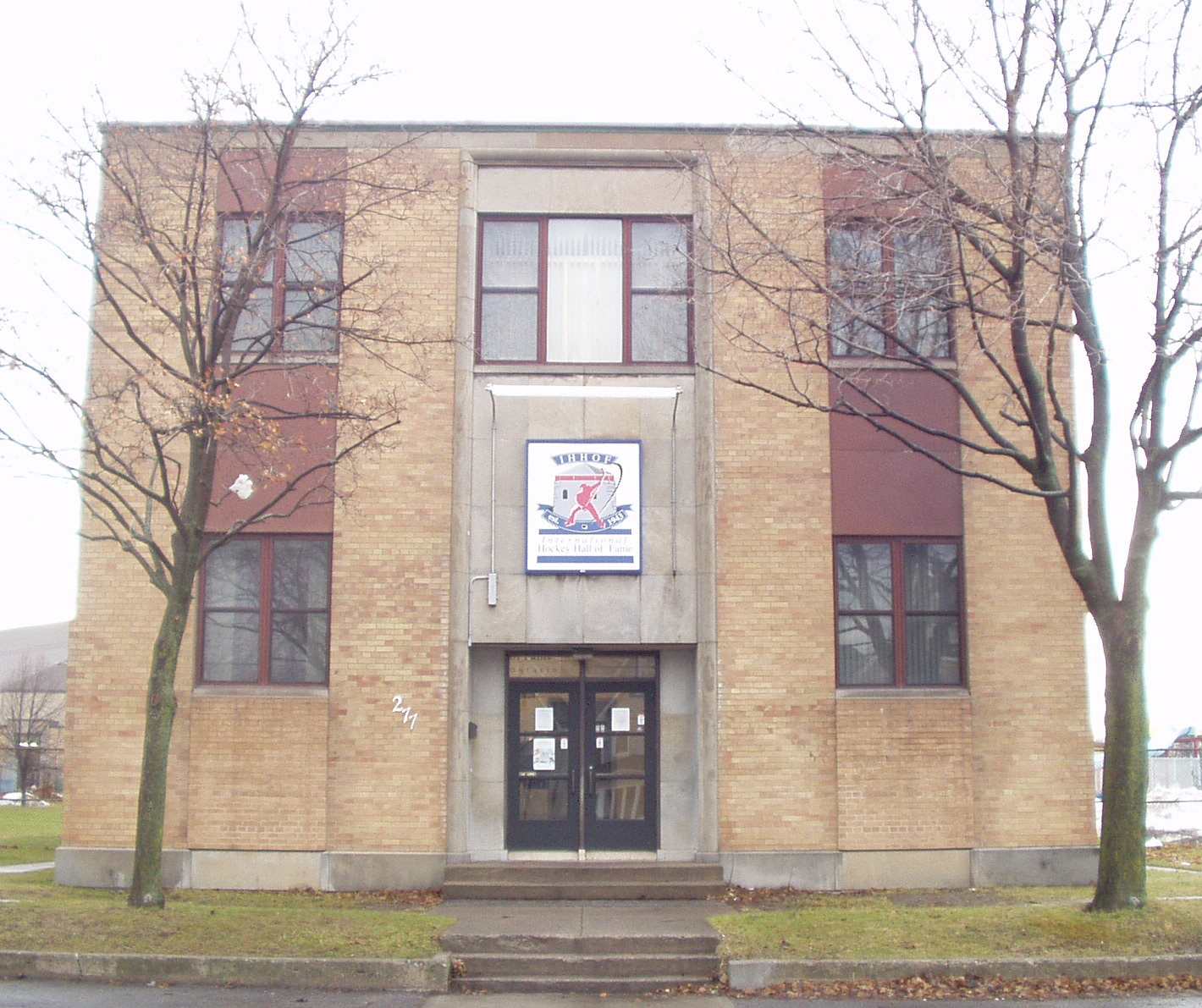
The International Hockey Hall of Fame's former home from 1965 to 2012.

Fitsell began his journalism career with The Lindsay Post in 1946, and then worked for the Lindsay Watchman Warder, the Woodstock Sentinel-Review, the Port Perry Star, and the Ontario Churchman. He moved to writing for the Gananoque Reporter in 1952. He joined The Kingston Whig-Standard in 1961 as the Gananoque Bureau Chief, then became the district editor. He began writing the column "People" in 1978. He worked full-time until 1988, then as a part-time contributor until 1993.

From the early 1950s, Fitsell was involved in the community as a minor ice hockey coach and convenor in Gananoque and Kingston, Ontario. In March 1961, Fitsell attended a game in Gananoque where a 13-year-old Bobby Orr was discovered by scouts from the Boston Bruins while playing on a team from Parry Sound during the provincial playoffs.

Fitsell was involved with the International Hockey Hall of Fame from 1969 to 2005, as its secretary, curator, vice-president, president and then historian. He was a driving force behind the Historic Hockey Series, an annual re-enactment by teams from Queen's University at Kingston, the Royal Military College of Canada, and the Royal Canadian Horse Artillery, to commemorate early games played on natural ice in the Kingston harbour during the 1880s. He also helped organize the annual Carr-Harris Cup competition, between the Royal Military College of Canada and the United States Military Academy.

Fitsell joined the Kingston Historical Society in 1977, was its vice-president in the early 1990s, and then became its president in January 1994. He was the founding president of the Society for International Hockey Research in 1991, was a regular contributor to the Hockey Research Journal and editor of the society's newsletter. The initial research group for the society began with 17 members in May 1991, and grew to include 500 members globally as of October 2020.

=== Publications ===
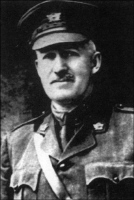
Captain James T. Sutherland

Fitsell wrote five books during his career, including a biography of Captain James T. Sutherland and the effort to establish the Hockey Hall of Fame in Kingston.

- Fitsell, J. W.; Hudson, Noel (1987). Hockey's Captains, Colonels and Kings. Erin, Ontario: Boston Mills Press. ISBN 9780919783683. OCLC 906497145.
- Fitsell, J. W.; Dawber, Michael (1994). Fitsell's Guide to the Old Ontario Strand: A Cultural and Historical Companion. Kingston, Ontario: Quarry Heritage Books. ISBN 9781550821215. OCLC 31169538.
- Fitsell, J. W.; Potter, Mark (2003). Hockey's Hub: Three Centuries of Hockey in Kingston. Kingston, Ontario: Quarry Heritage Books. ISBN 9781550823318. OCLC 1160346633.
- Fitsell, J. W. (2007). How Hockey Happened. Kingston, Ontario: Quarry Heritage Books. ISBN 9781550823479. OCLC 320876139.
- Fitsell, J. W. (2012). Captain James T. Sutherland: The Grand Old Man of Hockey & The Battle for the Original Hockey Hall of Fame. Kingston, Ontario: Quarry Heritage Books. ISBN 978-1-55082-374-5. OCLC 868354805.

== Personal life ==
Fitsell and his wife were married for 75 years and had five daughters. They resided in Kingston for more than fifty years. According to Fitsell's daughter, he did not have a car nor a driver's license until after aged 40, since he was scared of driving due to reporting on accidents for many years.

Fitsell was a member of the Royal Canadian Legion Branch 9, the Royal Canadian Horse Artillery Brigade Association, and the Kingston Jazz Society. His other interests included serving on the Kingston Buskers' Committee, the Kingston Heritage Tattoo Society, and the Queen's University Archives Committee.

Fitsell was hospitalized in October 2020, and died at the Kingston General Hospital on December 3, 2020.

== Honours and legacy ==
Fitsell received an honour award from the Ontario Minor Hockey Association in 1967 for distinguished service, and the 125th Anniversary of the Confederation of Canada Medal in 1993. He was inducted into the Lindsay District Sports Hall of Fame in 1995. He was made a Paul Harris Fellow by the Rotary Club in 2005, and was given the Brian McFarlane Award in 2006 from the Society for International Hockey Research in recognition of his research and writing. Fitsell was inducted into the builder category of the Kingston and District Sports Hall of Fame in 2009. The archives of Queen's University at Kingston keeps fonds of Fitsell's historical collections, research and writing on ice hockey.
