= Battle honour =

Combat award for a military unit

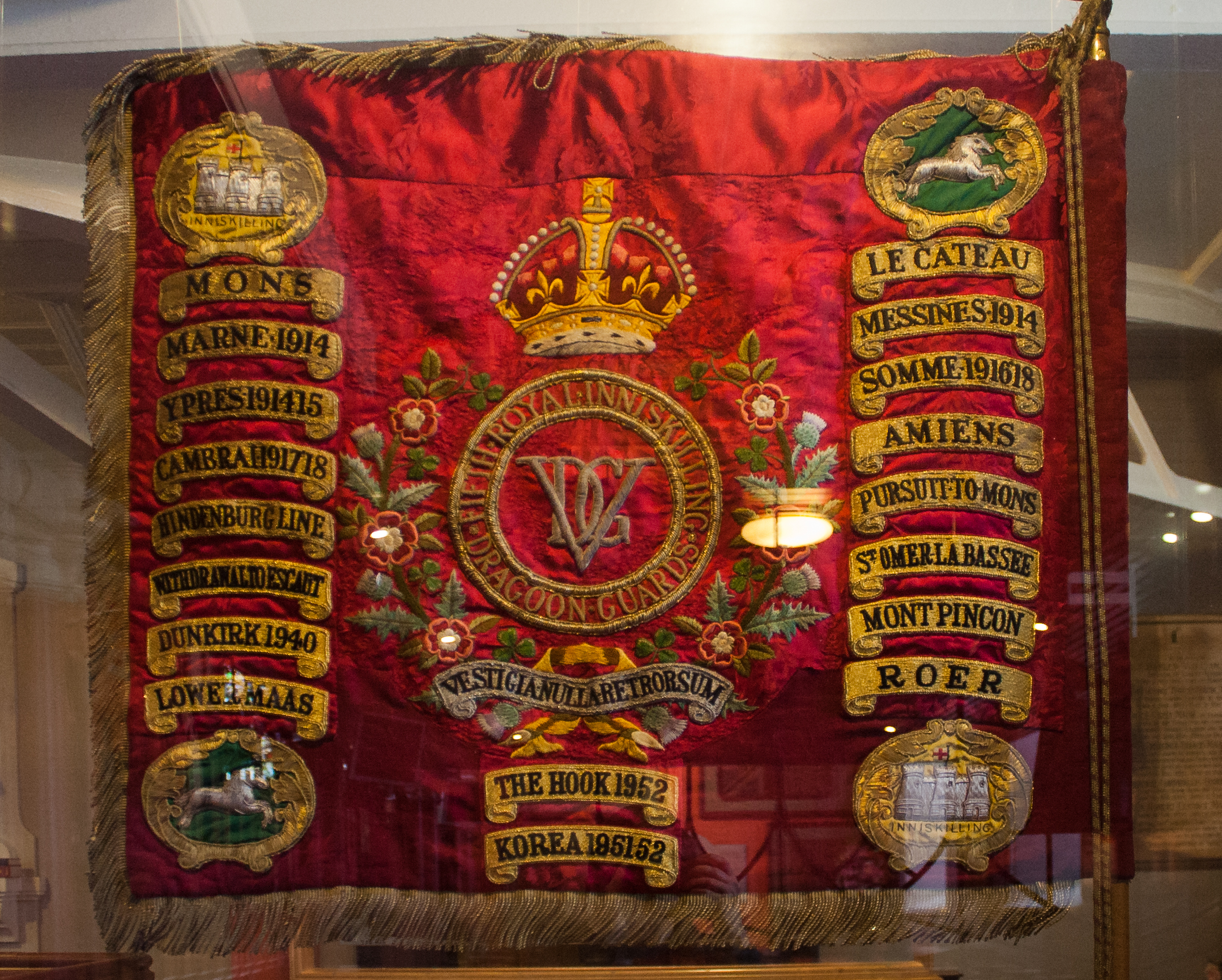
The regimental colours of the 5th Royal Inniskilling Dragoon Guards, displaying the battle honours awarded to the regiment.

A battle honour is an award of a right by a government or sovereign to a military unit to emblazon the name of a battle or operation on its flags ("colours"), uniforms or other accessories where ornamentation is possible.

In European military tradition, military units may be acknowledged for their achievements in specific wars or operations of a military campaign. In Great Britain and those countries of the Commonwealth which share a common military legacy with the British, battle honours are awarded to selected military units as official acknowledgement for their achievements in specific wars or operations of a military campaign. These honours usually take the form of a place and a date (e.g. "Cambrai 1917").

Theatre honours, a type of recognition in the British tradition closely allied to battle honours, were introduced to honour units which provided sterling service in a campaign but were not part of specific battles for which separate battle honours were awarded. Theatre honours could be listed and displayed on regimental property but not emblazoned on the colours.

Since battle honours are primarily emblazoned on colours, artillery units, which do not have colours in the British military tradition, were awarded honour titles instead. These honour titles were permitted to be used as part of their official nomenclature, for example 13 Field Regiment (Chushul).

Similar honours in the same tenor include unit citations.

Battle honours, theatre honours, honour titles and their ilk form a part of the wider variety of distinctions which serve to distinguish military units from each other.

== In the British military tradition ==
=== Origins ===
For the British Army, the need to adopt a system to recognise military units' battlefield accomplishments was apparent since its formation as a standing army in the later part of the 17th century. Although the granting of battle honours had already been in place at the time, it was not until 1784 that infantry units were authorised to bear battle honours on their colours. Before then, a regiment's colours were practical tools for rallying troops in the battlefield and not quite something for displaying the unit's past distinctions.

The first battle honour to be awarded in the British Army was granted to the 15th Hussars for the Battle of Emsdorf in 1760. Thereafter, other regiments received battle honours for some of their previous engagements.

The earliest battle honour in the British Army is Tangier 1662–80, granted to the Tangier Horse (later known as the 1st Royal Dragoons), the oldest line cavalry regiment of the British army, who in 1969 amalgamated with the Royal Horse Guards to become The Blues and Royals. Also awarded the honour was the 2nd Regiment of Foot, or the Tangier Regiment now The Princess of Wales's Royal Regiment, the senior English regiment in the Union (after the Royal Scots, the senior Scottish and British Regiment), for their protracted 23-year defence of the Colony of Tangier. The battle honour is still held by the successor regiment, the Princess of Wales's Royal Regiment. During these early years of the British standing army, a regiment needed only to engage the enemy with musketry before it was eligible for a battle honour. However, older battle honours are carried on the standards of the Yeomen of the Guard and the Honourable Corps of Gentlemen at Arms, neither of which are part of the army, but are instead the Sovereign's Bodyguard, in the personal service of the sovereign.

The need to develop a centralised system to oversee the selection and granting of battle honours arose in the 19th century following the increase of British military engagements during the expansion of the Empire. Thus in 1882, a committee was formed to adjudicate applications of battle honour claims. This committee, later called the Battles Nomenclature Committee, still maintains its function in the British Army today.

=== Entitlement ===
A battle honour may be granted to infantry/cavalry regiments or battalions, as well as ships (see Naval battle honours below) and squadrons; they are rarely granted to sub-units such as companies, platoons and sections in the army. Battle honours are usually presented in the form of a name of a country, region, or city where the unit's distinguished act took place, usually together with the year when it occurred.

Not every battle fought will automatically result in the granting of a battle honour. Conversely, a regiment or a battalion might obtain more than one battle honour over the course of a larger operation. For example, the 2nd Battalion of the Scots Guards were awarded two battle honours for their role in the Falklands War; "Tumbledown Mountain" specifically for the Battle of Mount Tumbledown, and "Falkland Islands 1982" for the overall conflict. Similarly, while in Korea, Princess Patricia's Canadian Light Infantry earned both "Kapyong" (for the Battle of Kapyong) and "Korea 1951–1953" (for the overall war). Victory is not required to earn a battle honour: the Hong Kong Volunteer Defence Corps received the battle honour "Hong Kong" despite the defeat and capture of most of the force during the Japanese invasion of Hong Kong, while the cruiser HMAS Sydney was awarded the naval engagement honour "Kormoran 1941" after being sunk with all aboard by the German raider Kormoran.

Supporting corps/branches such as medical, service, ordnance, or transport do not currently receive battle honours. However, and uniquely the Royal Logistic Corps has five battle honours inherited from its previous transport elements, such as the Royal Waggon Train. Commonwealth artillery does not maintain battle honours as they carry neither colours nor guidons—though their guns by tradition are afforded many of the same respects and courtesies. However, both the Royal Artillery and Royal Engineers were in 1832 granted by King William IV the right to use the Latin "Ubique", meaning everywhere, as a battle honour. This is worn on the cap badge of both the Corps of Royal Engineers and the Royal Regiment of Artillery (but not the Royal Horse Artillery). Likewise the Royal Marines, although a colours-carrying service, was granted, along with the conventional battle honour of "Gibraltar", the "Great Globe itself" by King George IV for its very numerous battle honours around the world.

The practice was later extended to these same regiments and corps in the successor Commonwealth armed forces.

=== Battle honours for the Second World War ===
The Battles Nomenclature Committee advised operational Army Headquarters on the granting of battle honours. At the end of the war, the army received a report from the committee containing:

- The definitions of war theatre, battle, action and engagement
- A detailed list of all theatres, battles, actions and engagements throughout the entire war for which regiments could be granted battle honours

The army ordered regiments to form honours committees comprising at least five regimental officers, including past and present commanding officers, and the honorary colonel and lieutenant colonel. The regimental committee reviewed the report to determine which battle honours were claimable based on the unit's wartime service. The regiment submitted an application of claims to the army with evidence showing that the unit was worthy of the battle honours. Claims could also be made for actions not listed in the report. In Britain, public announcements followed the final approval of claims. The ceremonial granting of new battle honours would be made in the form of the presentation of new Regimental and Sovereign's Colours to the regiment by the British monarch or an agent of the Crown, such as the Governor General of a commonwealth dominion.

=== Display ===
In British and Commonwealth armies a unit's battle honours can normally be found engraved, painted or embroidered on:

- The Queen's Colour/King's Colour and Regimental Colour (in regiments of Foot Guards and line infantry)
- The Regimental guidon (for cavalry regiments)
- The Queen's Truncheon of the Royal Gurkha Rifles
- Drums of the regimental band and the corps of drums/pipes and drums
- The baldric worn by the Drum Major of the regimental band/pipes and drums
- The Drum Major's mace
- A regimental pipes and drums' pipe banners

As there is no order of precedence for battle honours, they are listed in chronological order, either in a single list, or in multiple even numbers of columns, reading left to right, and top to bottom. On drums, the honours are listed on scrolls, usually with the cap badge central, and other unit devices present (such as a representation of a unit distinction or motto).

The honours for the First and Second World Wars were restricted in that only a certain number of honours (up to ten each for the First and Second World Wars) could be selected for emblazonment, that is appear on colours or drums. This was due to the large number of battle honours awarded. It is often the case that battle honours not carried on the colours (limited by space and design) will be emblazoned on the drum major's baldric.

=== Significance ===
While regimental colours and guidons are no longer carried on operations by British and Commonwealth military, as was their initial military function, the battle honours they carry are held in high esteem by military personnel. Regiments take pride in their battle honours, and the winning of further battle honours, as these are seen to enhance a unit's reputation.

It remains a tradition that whenever military personnel meet a colour or guidon, it must be saluted. This is not only because it is an object which represents the authority of the Crown, but also because the colours contain a regiment's battle honours, and thus represent the regiment's history and its deeds. Saluting a colour or guidon is thus a pivotal act in retaining an awareness of regimental history and traditions—key in the functioning of the regimental system. It remains common for army instructors to ensure that their recruits have memorised and are able to recite all of their regiment's battle honours. Such methods are meant to bring the new soldier into the regimental ethos and sub-culture by means of imprinting shared history.

In some cases where a battle honour was not granted, a special distinction has been substituted. For example, soldiers of The Rifles wear a cap badge on both the front and the rear of their hats. This so-called "back badge" is unique in the British Army and was awarded to the 28th Regiment of Foot for their actions at the Battle of Alexandria in 1801. Knowledge of that battle honour, represented by the back badge, is said to have encouraged the soldiers of the Gloucestershire Regiment in the defence of Gloster Hill during the Battle of the Imjin River in April 1951 during the Korean War.

Other uniform distinctions include:

- Oakleaf Shoulder Badge (The Calgary Highlanders (10th Canadians), The Canadian Scottish Regiment (Princess Mary's) and The Royal Winnipeg Rifles), awarded for "Kitcheners' Wood" in April 1915. No battle honour had been granted and the units petitioned for a special badge.
- Sphinx: Several British regiments have a sphinx on their regimental colour as well as cap badges and belt buckles to commemorate service in Egypt, specifically the Battle of Alexandria in 1801.
- Eagle: The Royal Scots Dragoon Guards have an eagle on their cap badge to commemorate the capture of a French Imperial Eagle at Waterloo by the Royal Scots Greys. The Blues and Royals similarly wear an eagle as a shoulder badge commemorating the Eagle captured at Waterloo by the Royal Dragoons.

=== Overseas awards to British military units ===
Subject to approval by the sovereign, awards made by other allied nations may be permitted to be worn or carried. For example, several units have been awarded the French Croix de guerre 1914–1918 and Croix de guerre 1939–1945, the ribbon of which can be worn on the uniform. The United States Presidential Unit Citation, as with other similar citations, is similarly worn on the uniform (usually on the arm), but is also carried on the colour or guidon of the unit it has been awarded to. In the Commonwealth, three units are permitted to carry this award on their Regimental Colour:

- 2nd Battalion, Princess Patricia's Canadian Light Infantry
- 3rd Battalion, Royal Australian Regiment
- D Company, 6th Battalion, Royal Australian Regiment (Awarded to D Company but carried by the battalion as a whole)

The 2nd Battalion, Princess Patricia's Canadian Light Infantry and the 3rd Battalion, Royal Australian Regiment received their awards for their actions at the Battle of Kapyong during the Korean War. Although their regiments carry the honour "Kapyong" as a whole, only these specific battalions are permitted to carry the PUC streamer that denotes the award by the United States and wear the ribbon on the uniform. D Company, 6th Battalion, Royal Australian Regiment were awarded their Presidential Unit Citation for their actions during the Battle of Long Tan in the Vietnam War. Although awarded to D Company, it is carried on the 6th Battalion's Colours and worn on the uniform of all members of the battalion. The PUC was awarded to the 1st Battalion, Gloucestershire Regiment for its actions at the Battle of Imjin River in 1951, with the tradition continued by its successor, the Royal Gloucestershire, Berkshire and Wiltshire Regiment, until its amalgamation into The Rifles.

=== Naval battle honours ===
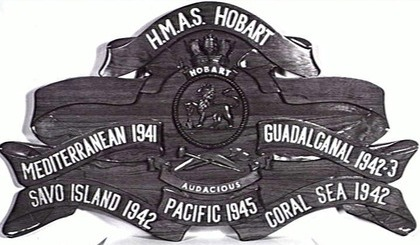
A carved board displaying the battle honours carried by the cruiser HMAS Hobart. The battle honours (and the campaigns they were earned for) are: • MEDITERRANEAN 1941 (Battle of the Mediterranean) • SAVO ISLAND 1942 (Battle of Savo Island) • PACIFIC 1945 (Pacific War) • GUADALCANAL 1942-3 (Guadalcanal Campaign) • CORAL SEA 1942 (Battle of the Coral Sea)

Naval battle honours are battle honours awarded to warships. There are two types of naval battle honours: those awarded to ships that participate in a battle or campaign, or those for single-ship actions. Honours for battles take their name from the location of the battle, while honours for actions are named for the opposing ship. These are rendered differently, in order to distinguish between the two types and to limit confusion between battle honours with the same name (for example, between the multi-ship Battle of the Chesapeake in 1781, and the capture of USS Chesapeake by HMS Shannon in 1813). In older sources and on battle honour boards, battles are written in all capitals, while actions are capitalised normally and surrounded by single quotation marks (CHESAPEAKE 1781 and 'Chesapeake' 1813). Newer sources display battles with normal capitalisation, and italicise actions in the same way ships' names are italicised; both may or may not be contained in double quotation marks ("Chesapeake 1781" and "Chesapeake 1813"). The battle honours awarded to a ship are inherited by all subsequent warships of the same name.

Battle honours for Commonwealth warships were initially awarded and controlled by the British Admiralty, under the "Commonwealth Battle Honours List". Warships of Commonwealth navies would also inherit the honours of any preceding British warship of the name. Commonwealth navies later moved to independent but parallel systems. Australia began moving away by instituting a battle honour for the ships that served in the Vietnam War, then moved to a completely independent system before 1993, to avoid HMAS Newcastle (named for the city of Newcastle, New South Wales) inheriting the battle honours of Royal Navy ships named Newcastle. The Royal Canadian Navy began displaying battle honours in the 1950s, but after the Unification of the Canadian Forces in 1968, new units entering service would only carry those honours earned by Canadian ships.

The earliest recorded naval battle honour is ARMADA 1588, the defeat of the Spanish Armada at Gravelines by a combined British-Dutch fleet. Because of the significant number of ships sunk during World War I and World War II, only three battle honours have been awarded for single-ship actions since the start of the 20th century: to the Town-class cruiser HMAS Sydney for sinking the German light cruiser SMS Emden during the Battle of Cocos in November 1914 ('Emden' 1914), to the Commonwealth warships involved in the pursuit and last battle of the German battleship Bismarck in May 1941 ('Bismarck' 1941), and to the Leander-class cruiser HMAS Sydney for the mutually destructive engagement with the German auxiliary cruiser Kormoran in November 1941 ('Kormoran' 1941).

==== Battle honour board ====
As warships do not carry regimental colours, battle honours are instead displayed on a battle honour board. This is usually a solid wooden board (traditionally teak) mounted on the ship's superstructure, carved with the ship's badge and scrolls naming the ship and the associated honours, and either left completely unpainted, or with the lettering painted gold. The size of the board and number of scrolls is dependent on the number of honours earned by a ship and her predecessors, although it is common for blank scrolls to be included in a design. Other designs are also in use: these include plaques for the ship and honours mounted on a backing board, or the details painted onto a flat board.

The British Admiralty set honour board sizes for various types of ship: 10 by 6 feet (3.0 by 1.8 m) for capital ships and shore bases, 6 by 5 feet (1.8 by 1.5 m) for cruisers and large auxiliary ships, 4 by 3 feet (1.22 by 0.91 m) for all other surface ships, and 21 by 17 inches (53 by 43 cm) for submarines (the size restriction is so the board can be moved through the submarine's hatches, as it is only displayed when the submarine is on the surface).

=== Unusual awards of battle honours ===
Two educational institutions have been awarded battle honours. La Martinere College in Lucknow, India was awarded a battle honour, Defence of Lucknow 1857, for the role played by its students and teachers during the mutiny of 1857. McGill University in Canada received the award for their contingent's bravery at Arras in 1917 during the First World War.

The Royal Canadian Mounted Police, although a civilian police force, was awarded the status of a dragoon regiment by King George V following the service of many of its members during the First World War. As a consequence, it then became entitled to display the many honours it had won dating back to 1885:

- North West Canada, 1885
- South Africa, 1900–2
- France and Flanders, 1918
- Siberia, 1918–19
- Second World War 1939–45 Seconde Guerre mondiale
- Afghanistan, 2003–14

In addition, the RCMP received the honorary distinction of the badge of the Canadian Provost Corps, in recognition of the fact that the first Canadian military police unit was formed from volunteers from the RCMP.

The Army Post Office Corps (APOC) was the first British Volunteer unit to be awarded a battle honour for their participation in the 1882 Anglo-Egyptian War. The honour (Egypt 1882) was displayed on the regimental flag of 24 Middlesex Rifle Volunteer Corps (Post Office Rifles).

The only cadet unit to receive a battle honour is 1st Cadet Battalion, King's Royal Rifle Corps (KRRC). Around 100 older cadets, principally non-commissioned officers, served in the South African War with the KRRC, the City Imperial Volunteers and the Royal Army Medical Corps (RAMC). Four cadets were killed in action. In recognition of this service, King Edward VII granted the battalion the Battle Honour "South Africa 1900-1902". They are permitted to wear a miniature KRRC cap badge with this single battle honour, and call their members "riflemen" rather than cadets.

== France ==
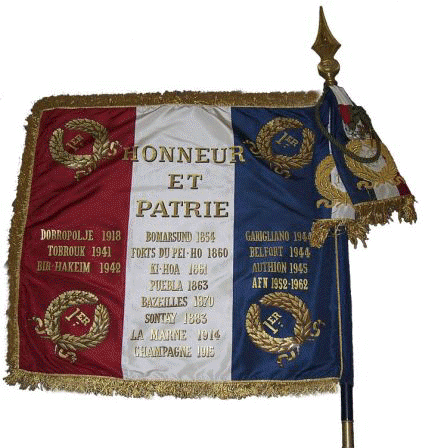
Flag of 1st Marine Infantry Regiment. The regiment has been awarded fifteen battle honours.

In France, battle honours, known officially as inscriptions des noms de batailles au drapeau (literally "inscriptions of names of battles on the flag"), were created during the Wars of the French Revolution. The first honour such awarded is Valmy, 1792, the last one to date is Koweït, 1991. The honours are sewn in gold letters on the regiment's flag or standard under the form battle name, date (such as Austerlitz, 1805). In some cases, the honour refers to a whole conflict and take the form geographical designation, date (such as AFN, 1952–1962) or simply war, date (such as Grande guerre, 1914–1918). Some military schools and academies have their motto sewn on their flags as a battle honour, such as École polytechnique's Pour la Patrie, les sciences et la gloire ('for Fatherland, sciences and glory') in addition to the "true" battle honour Paris, 1814.

During the 19th century, honours were limited to eight on a regiment's flag, leading to the removal of some honours to make room for newer ones. This limitation was upped to twelve honours after the Second World War. Some units, such as the 2nd Marine Infantry Regiment, have been awarded more than twelve honours, but their flag displays only the twelve considered the most important in the history of the regiment. Other units, such as the 1st Marine Infantry Regiment, have been granted a dispensation allowing them to emblazon all their battle honours, regardless of their number.

In addition to battle honours, military units can be awarded collective military decorations and collective mentions-in-dispatches, leading eventually to the fourragère award.

== Battle and theatre honours in India ==
Prior to independence, battle honours were awarded to British Indian Army as part of the British military tradition. Awards prior to the takeover of the Presidency Armies by the Crown in 1858 were done by the Governor General in India or the respective Presidency government that the units belonged to.

The practice of awarding battle honours and theatre honours to the Indian Army continued after independence in 1947 and these honours continue to be listed against a regiment's achievements. Battle honours, but not theatre honours, are permitted to be emblazoned on the President's Colours, which have replaced the King's colours after independence.

Battle honour days are celebrated by a few units or regiments. Present battle honour days however pertain to battles for which honours have been won post-independence.

Some battle honours, granted prior to independence to units for battles or campaigns in India against the local rulers or nationalist forces, have been declared as 'repugnant' and are not celebrated or held in esteem.

The earliest battle to be commemorated in the history of the British Indian Army was Plassey in 1757 which was awarded in 1829 vide Gazette of the Governor General No 43.

La Martinière is the only school in the world to have been awarded royal battle honours for its role in the defence of Lucknow during the Indian War of Independence of 1857. In the honour of this institution, The President of India also launched a stamp post in its name.

== See also ==
- Battle honours of the British Army
- Battle honours of the British and Imperial Armies
- Battle and theatre honours of the Australian Army
- Battle and theatre honours of the Indian Army
- Repugnant battle honours of the Indian Army
- Campaign streamer – a similar tradition of the U.S. military
- RAF battle honours
- List of South African Battle Honours
- List of Fleet Air Arm battle honours
