= Society for International Hockey Research =

Canadian hockey organization

- Abbreviation: SIHR
- Established: 1991; 35 years ago
- Founder: Bill Fitsell
- Founded at: Kingston, Ontario, Canada
- Purpose: History of ice hockey
- Headquarters: Toronto, Ontario, Canada
- Website: sihrhockey.org

The Society for International Hockey Research (SIHR) is a network of writers, statisticians, collectors, broadcasters, academics and ice hockey buffs. The society, based in Toronto, Ontario, has an international membership. The society cultivates and encourages the study of ice hockey. The society has been prominent in determining the origins of ice hockey.

== History ==
The society was formed in 1991. A group of 17 members attending the Canadian Association of Sports Heritage meeting at Kingston, Ontario, met in a special session with the aim of founding an organization dedicated to promoting, developing and encouraging the study of hockey, to establish an accurate historical account of the game, and to assist in the dissemination of the findings and studies derived from member research. Under the leadership of founding president Bill Fitsell, a retired journalist with the Kingston Whig-Standard, SIHR's general objectives were: "To encourage and cultivate the study of ice hockey as an important athletic and social institution in Canada and other countries in which it was played." A six-page, 25-article constitution was adopted at Montreal on May 22, 1993.

Among the charter members, also known as the "Kingston 17," were representatives from three provinces (New Brunswick, Quebec and Ontario) and two states (Illinois and New York). In its fledgling year, the society membership grew to 29 and in its second year the roster of 52 could be typed on one page. SIHR's membership list today stands at more than 550, with members in all ten Canadian provinces, 31 U.S. states and the District of Columbia, plus Australia, England, Finland, France, Germany, Italy, Japan, Russia, Scotland, Slovakia, Sweden, Switzerland and Wales. SIHR counts among its members a former Prime Minister of Canada, Stephen Harper.

At its 2001 annual meeting, SIHR struck a committee to examine the claim of Windsor, Nova Scotia, to be the birthplace of ice hockey. The committee's report, released in May 2002, that the Windsor proponents had not offered credible evidence that the town was the birthplace of hockey. The report expressed no opinion on when or where hockey originated.

The SIHR committee indicated that the March 3, 1875 game at the Victoria Skating Rink in Montreal was the earliest documented ice hockey game that it was aware of. "It is the earliest eyewitness account known, at least to this SIHR committee, of a specific game of hockey in a specific place at a specific time, and with a recorded score, between two identified teams."

In 2003, SIHR started developing its statistical database, available to members on its web site. Starting with the paper records, combined with the input of a 10,000 player database, SIHR's database has grown to include hundreds of thousands, coaches and officials. The database includes statistics dating back to the 1886–87 season for various professional, semi-professional and amateur male and female leagues. The player profiles include notes, bios and in some cases photos.

In 2008, the Society launched a campaign to raise funds to erect a monument to hockey pioneer James George Aylwin Creighton, whose grave in Ottawa's Beechwood Cemetery remained unmarked. On October 24, 2009, a grave marker was unveiled, as was a biographical plaque near the gravesite.

== Society activities ==
The society is managed by a board of directors. The board is elected by SIHR members at the Annual General Meeting (AGM). Terms for the positions of president and vice-president are valid for two years, while all other positions are voted on annually.

The organization holds two formal meetings a year. The society holds the AGM each spring in various locations around North America. The AGM serves to give attending members a summary of the actions of the past year, and features research presentations by members and guest speakers. The society also holds an annual fall meeting. The May 2016 AGM marked the organization's twenty-fifth anniversary and was held in Kingston, Ontario, at the Memorial Hall on the upper level of Kingston City Hall.
