= Royal Military College Paladins =

Royal Military College of Canada athletic teams

Coordinates: 44°13′44″N 76°28′07″W

RMC Paladins
- University: Royal Military College of Canada
- Nickname: Paladins
- Association: U Sports
- Conference: Ontario University Athletics
- Athletic director: Darren Cates
- Location: Kingston, Ontario
- Varsity teams: 8 (5 men's, 3 women's)
- Ice hockey arena: Constantine Arena
- Soccer stadium: Navy Bay Field
- Volleyball arena: SAM Gym
- Other venues: Inner Field (rugby)
- Colours: red and white
- Mascot: Paladin
- Fight song: "Precision"
- Website: gopaladinsgo.ca
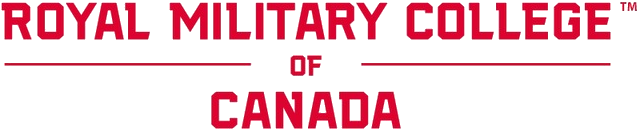

The RMC Paladins (French: Paladins du CMR) are the athletic teams that represent Royal Military College of Canada in Kingston, Ontario, Canada. Its facilities include the Kingston Military Community Sport Centre (KMCSC) with seating for 3,737, the Navy Bay fields with seating for 800 and Constantine Arena with seating for 1,500 and the Birchall Pavilion.

== Varsity teams ==
The Paladins currently compete in five sports in the Ontario University Athletics Association (OUA):

Men's sports	Women's sports
Fencing	Fencing
Ice hockey	Soccer
Rugby	Volleyball
Soccer	
Volleyball	

== Facilities ==
Venue	Sport(s)	Capacity	Ref.
SAM Gym	Volleyball	4,000	
Constantine Arena	Ice hockey	1,500	
Navy Bay Field	Soccer	n/a	
Inner Field	Rugby	n/a	
Anderson Field House	Fencing	n/a	

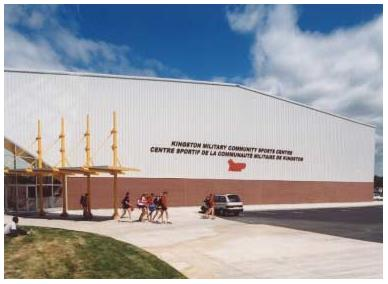
Kingston Military Community Sports Center used by Royal Military College of Canada

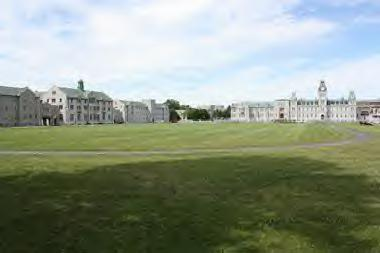
Royal Military College of Canada campus inner field

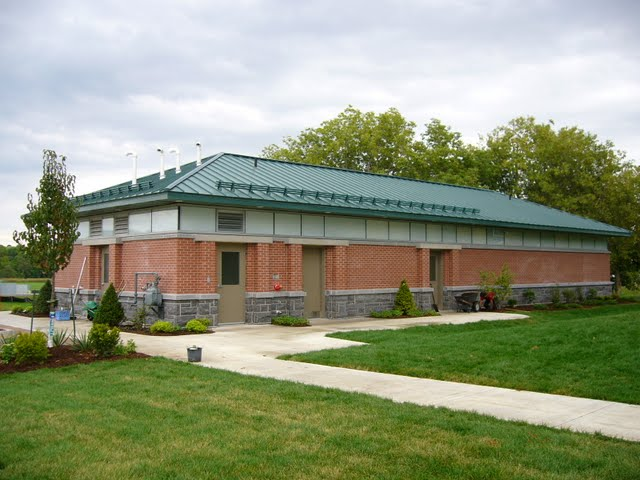
Birchall Pavilion, Royal Military College of Canada

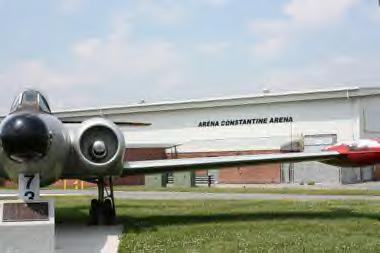
Royal Military College of Canada Constantine Arena

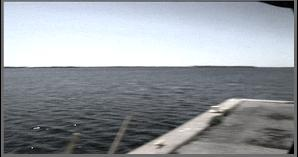
St Lawrence Pier, Royal Military College of Canada

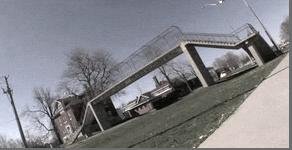
Royal Military College of Canada foot bridge from campus to Kingston Military Community Sports Center

Institution	Team	City	Province	Founded	Affiliation	Enrollment	Endowment	Membership	Division
Royal Military College of Canada	Paladins	Kingston	ON	1876	Public	900	*	OUA	East

== RMC coaching ==
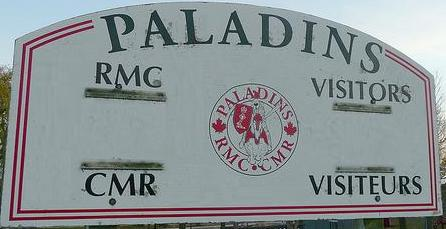
Paladins scoreboard, inner field, Royal Military College of Canada

The Director of Athletics, Darren Cates, oversees Physical Education, Recreation, Intramurals and the varsity program and has 26 full-time employees. "At a civilian university you must justify why physical activity is important. Here you don't have to do that," said Cates. "At RMC it is accepted that physical activity and sports are valuable and needed. We're held in the same regard as academics and second language training."

Although the RMC does not give out Athletic Financial Awards (AFAs), students have a subsidized education through the Canadian Forces. Unlike many civilian universities, the RMC only employs full-time coaches who can spend all of their time focusing on their teams and their recruiting efforts.

== RMC student-athlete prospects ==
Prospective student-athletes at RMC should meet at least seven of the 10 criteria:

- plays RMC sport at an "elite" level during his or her high school years;
- history of being a responsible person;
- potentially motivated towards RMC and Canadian Forces;
- history of being involved in community, school or church activities (2 out of 3);
- demonstrated good work ethic in full-time or part-time volunteer positions;
- dynamic and steadfast;
- thrives on challenges;
- potentially academically solid;
- excellent time-management skills; and
- has what it takes to be a potential "leader".

== History ==
Royal Military College of Canada Cadets perform human pyramid, 1901.

This photo of Royal Military College of Canada cadets doing a gymnastics routine, taken in 1901 in Kingston, is part of the Canada Patent and Copyright Office collection. The cadets are performing human pyramids, where the students work on balance, strength, cooperation, and teamwork. In this stunt, participants form pyramids of layers of persons, each standing on two others one level lower, one half a position to the right and the other to the left.

In 1931–32, Brigadier WHP Elkins, RMC Commandant, introduced an academic eligibility rule for participation on the hockey and football teams which barred cadets with academic averages below 40%. He subsequently reported an improvement in the quality of the classwork and another successful year in intercollegiate competition.

=== Redmen to Paladins ===
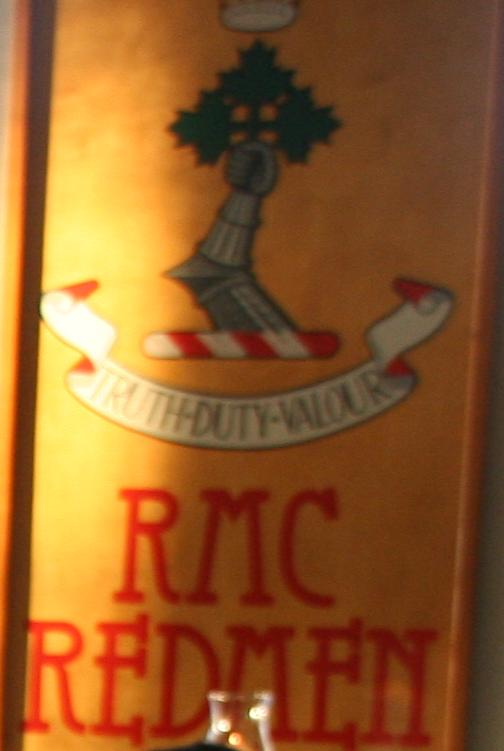
Royal Military College Redmen logo

Once RMC re-opened after World War II, varsity athletes representing RMC were proud to call themselves the Redmen in competition. It represented one of the most prevalent facets of RMC tradition, the wearing of the scarlet uniform on formal parades. Gentlemen cadets first took on the name because it was an all-male institution at the time and due to the red uniform, hence red-men, informally "Reddies". In 1996, women had been studying as RMC cadets for sixteen years so college authorities thought it was necessary to change the varsity title to something that was representative of the whole cadet wing. Furthermore, the college was receiving some criticism that Redmen was a derogatory name for Canada's Aboriginal People.

With the closure of Royal Roads Military College (RRMC) and College militaire royal de St-Jean (CMR) in 1995, RMC saw two more student bodies join the college. Because of a large induction of francophone students from CMR, RMC was transformed into a bilingual university. General Charles Emond, the commandant at the time, decided that the Redmen was not a fit name for this bilingual and coeducational institution. Therefore, he invited the officer cadets to choose a new name.

Gen Emond set out very specific criteria for the Redmen's replacement. He decreed that the new name had to be representative of the profession of arms; it had to be identified in two languages; it also had to be unisex and original. Furthermore, the name needed to be representative of a person, people or animal rather than an inanimate object. The logo associated with the name had to be simple and easily identifiable for the public. The new name should also be easily incorporated into college chants and songs.

Various committees, composed of cadets and staff, came up with twenty-four new names for the varsity teams, such as the Cavaliers or the Red's, the two most popular names were the Sabers and the Paladins. There was vote cast by the staff and students to decide on which of the three top choices would be the one. A committee of twenty-four people was established to advertise each of the proposed names. The committee held an electoral campaign of sorts where each name was given a logo and mascot to better relate to the college on what they were voting for.

The whole process of finally choosing a name took two years to complete and as a result, the college was without a sports name for the 1996–97 season. In 1997, the Director of Cadets, Lieutenant Colonel (LCol) Michaud released the new name. All RMC representative sports teams would now be called the Paladins. The name Paladins had won by a landslide of 70% of the votes, it was also the only name that met the criteria demanded by Gen Emond.

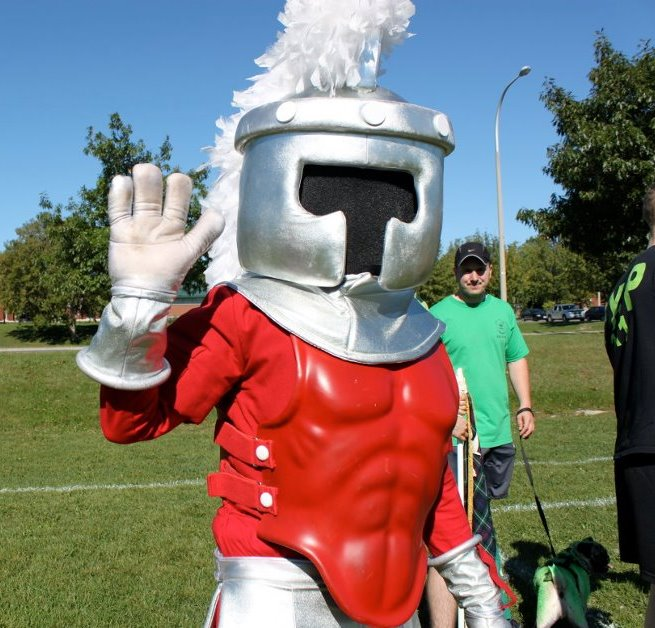
Royal Military College of Canada mascot: Paladin

Since 1997, athletes of the Royal Military College of Canada have been known as the Paladins. Paladins were knights of the Crusades who modeled themselves as honest, courageous, loyal and chivalrous knights who prided themselves on their skill in battle.

In 2002, Rear-Admiral David Morse, the commandant at the time, decided to change the logo to the royal crown and mailed fist of RMC.

Some of the sports teams, namely the Hockey team and the Rugby team, still continue to call themselves 'Redmen' in unofficial forums. Although the uniforms now say Paladins, those teams have never accepted the name change and keep up the old tradition.

In 2001, the RMC cut their interuniversity programs from 30 down to 11. In 2002, the commandant of the college, R.Adm. Morse, made the decision to scale back the varsity sports program. This was done with the stated goal of increasing the competitiveness of the remaining sports by consolidating the skilled athletes. Also stated was a desire to encourage teamwork and leadership that would be necessary for cadets once they left the college. This move was unpopular within the student body of the college, and amongst ex-Cadets, as it left students who were very competitive in a sport of their choice without a means to participate. Among the teams cut were Men's and Women's rugby union, track and field, swimming, rowing, biathlon and karate; while the college kept the hockey, soccer, volleyball, basketball, taekwondo and fencing teams. In 2004, after lobbying by RMC alumni and support from the student body, the college brought back the Men's Rugby team at the Varsity level.

In 2007, the RMC Running Team started once again to compete at the OUA / CIS level.

== West Point Weekend ==
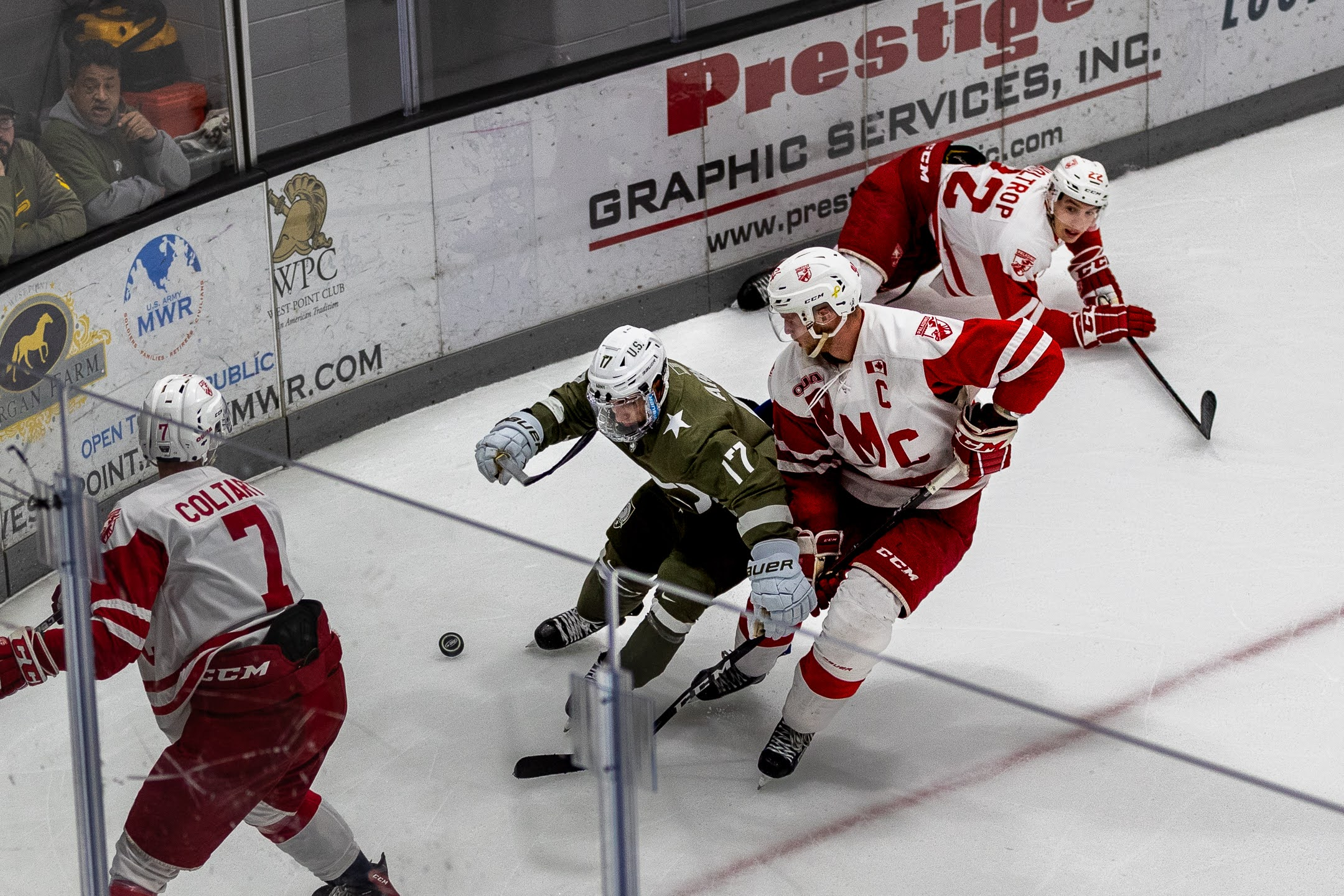
A men's ice hockey game between the Paladins and Army Black Knights men's ice hockey team at Tate Rink in 2024

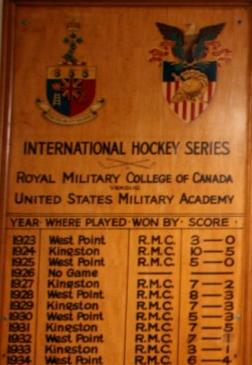
West Point series plaque, RMC vs USMA, Currie Hall, RMC

The West Point series originated when the commandant of RMC, Sir Archibald McDonnell and the superintendent of the United States Military Academy (West Point), Brigadier General Douglas MacArthur, suggested a game of hockey between the two schools in 1921. After two years of exchanging ideas the first game was played on February 23, 1923 at West Point. The Redmen won that first game 3–0 and a New York paper stated "Army was beaten at hockey today by Royal Military College of Kingston, Ontario. The Canadian cadets excelled the Army men all the way, displaying the best all-around form seen here in years. Hamilton and the Carr-Harris's were the outstanding stars of the Canadian team. This game was one of the cleanest-fought contests staged here this winter and was marked by a fine display of sportsmanship on both sides." In commemoration of the game, RMC donated the "Challenge Trophy".

In 1924, the series moved to Kingston thus beginning the tradition of rotating venues. This was Army's first away game and up until 1941 the West Point Game was the only time that Army played away from the Academy.

== Historic Hockey Series ==
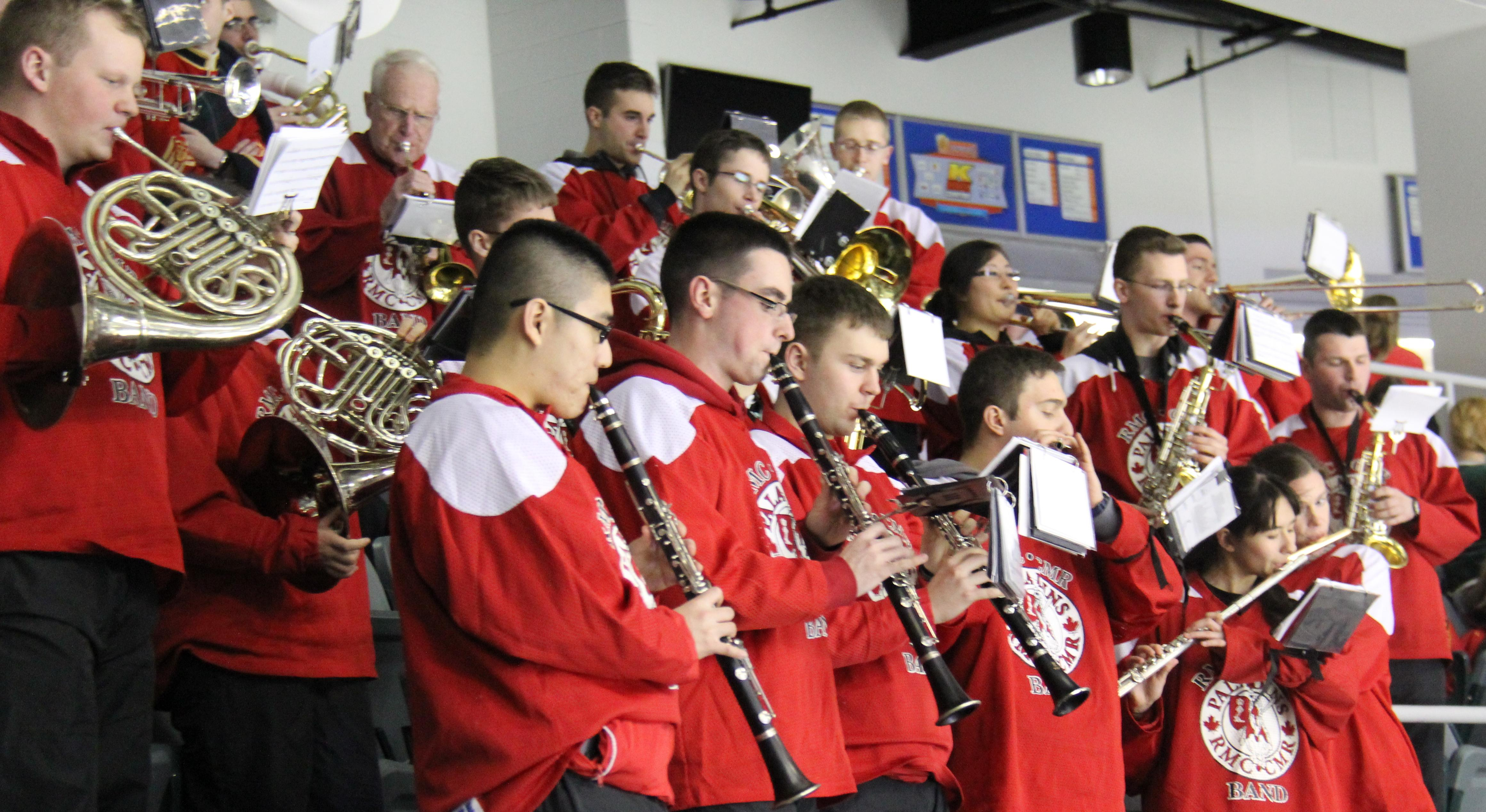
Royal Military College of Canada band entertains crowd @ Carr Harris Cup hockey game, K-Rock Centre, Jan 2013, K-Rock Centre

The Canadian Amateur Hockey Association recognizes a claim that Kingston, Ontario is the birthplace of ice hockey from a game played between Queen's University and the Royal Military College of Canada in 1886. This game is memorialized by the International Hockey Hall of Fame annual Historic Hockey Series. The Queen's vs. RMC rivalry dates back to 1886 and is the longest in hockey history. Since that time the rivalry has continued to grow with fans travelling to the cross-town rival RMC.

Royal Military College formerly competed in the intermediate division of the Ontario Hockey Association, and won the J. Ross Robertson Cup during the 1930–31 season.

== Wing Harrier Race and sports day ==
The annual Wing Harrier Race and sports day is held in the fall. During the traditional Wing Harrier race, a 5 kilometre run around the peninsula, cadets are allowed to wear colourful costumes to support the squadrons. The day includes various activities such as tabloids, the maze challenge, Flag football, tug-of-war and the chain of command relay race. The day finishes off with the award ceremony.

== Sandhurst Competition ==
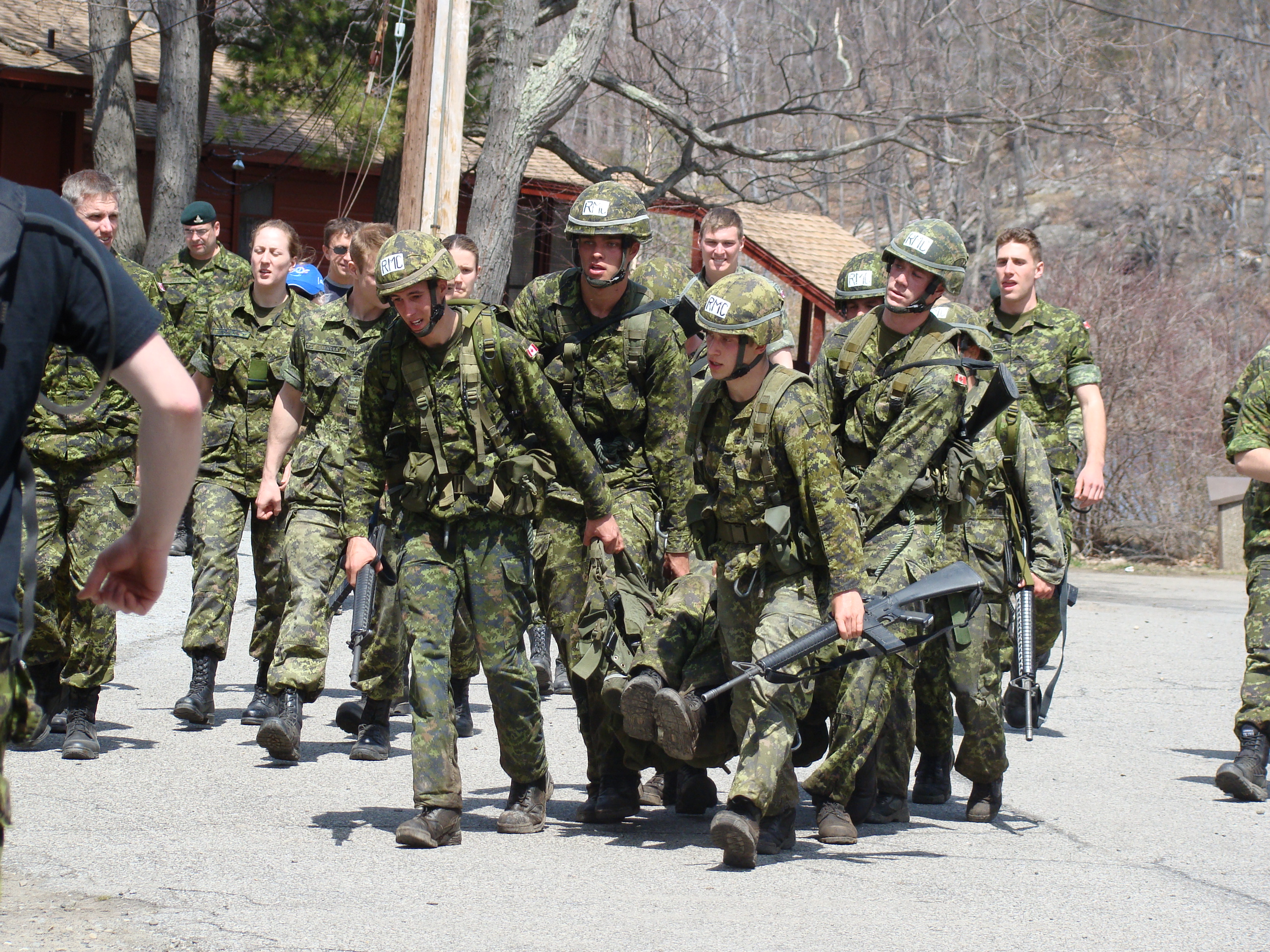
Royal Military College of Canada Cadets compete at Sandhurst in 2009

The college won the competition in 2005, 2006 and 2007. Following defeat by the Sandhurst Academy team in 2008, RMC won the Sandhurst Competition again in 2009. The military skills competition included an equipment inspection, boat movement, marksmanship, grenade throwing, first aid, river crossing, wall obstacle, and radio communications.

== Physical performance ==
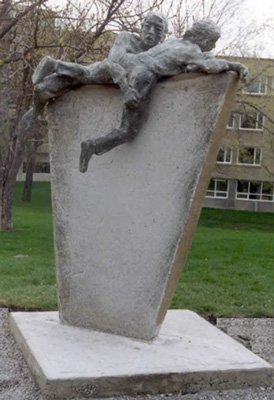
To Overcome, sculpture by John Boxtel, memorialized annual obstacle course, Royal Military College of Canada

RMC students must also complete the RMC Physical Performance Test three times each year. The test consists of five components, which are scored separately, and the total is summed together for a final score with a maximum of 500 points.

== Student athletes ==
In the 2006–07 school year, 15 RMC student-athletes earned Academic All-Canadian status under CIS guidelines while another 5 fencers earned the equivalent OUA achievement.

== Proficiency badges ==
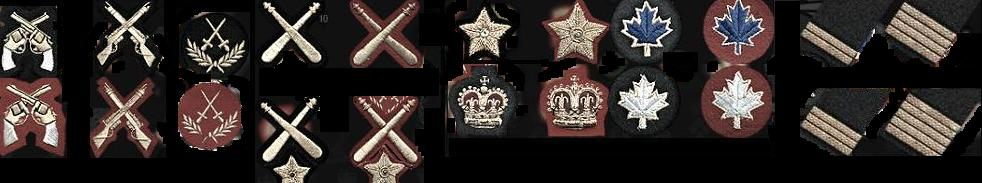
Royal Military College of Canada badges 2011

The gold thread crossed pistols are awarded as a military badge for marksmanship when markman levels are achieved for the pistol; a crown is awarded in May to the top score in the College. The gold thread crossed rifles are awarded as a military badge for marksmanship when markman levels are achieved for the rifle; a crown is awarded in May to the top score in the College. The gold thread cross swords in a laurel wreath military proficiency badge is awarded if the following conditions have been met by the student: a mark of at least B in military assessment; positive leadership qualities in the summer training report; an academic average of at least 70%; a mark of at least B in physical training; a satisfactory mark in the bilingualism profile; A crown is awarded to the top Cadet having received this award, by year. All students are awarded at least a blue start for a start at bilingualism. As they achieve proficiency, they receive a silver or gold star. An academic distinction badge is awarded to a student with an academic average of at least 80% at the end of the year. Physical fitness badges are awarded upon reaching a certain number of points. As cadets learn and demonstrate leadership skills, they are appointed to different positions. The number of bars increases from 0 to 5 as students are promoted.

== Awards ==
Awards are granted to outstanding cadets:

Award	Description	Honours	Photo
D Walter Avis University Training Program Non Commissioned Members honour shield	Honour shield salutes best UTPNCM	Professor D Walter Avis	
Douglas Massey Cook Memorial Cup	Team of the Year	11228 Douglas Massey Cook (CMR RMC 1977)	
Captain Matthew Dawe Memorial Cup	The Capt. Matthew Dawe Memorial Cup salutes the outstanding male or female ROTP varsity athlete who excels in all aspects of college life.	Named in memory of Capt. Matthew Dawe who was killed in action while in Afghanistan in 2007. Inaugural winner was Matt Lorrain from Men's Volleyball in 2008.	
Commandant's Athletic Achievement Award	Royal Military College of Canada Cadet Athletic Achievement	College Commandant	
Dr. Ian Crawford Memorial Award	Presented to the Athletic Trainer who embodies Dr. Crawford's characteristics of commitment, professionalism, sacrifice and passion for RMC sports.	Dr. Ian Crawford, a physician at RMC from 2002-2007 and team doctor for RMC men`s basketball, rugby and hockey.	
Greenwood Cup	top female runner of the Annual Harrier Race -"for Annual Competition by Gentlemen Cadets" until 1954.	3252 EA "Ted" Tromanhauser (RMC '54)	
HRH The Prince of Wales Trophy	Awarded since 1919 to best all around Royal Military College of Canada Cadet in athletics during the entire course	His Royal Highness Edward VIII The Prince of Wales, who donated cup in 1919	
OCdt Kelly Gawne Memorial Trophy	Instituted in 1989, Kelly Gawne Memorial Trophy salutes the Best All Round Lady Cadet at Royal Military College of Canada in Athletics	Named in memory of 17333 Cadet Kelly Gawne, who was killed in a summer training accident at Chilliwack, BC in 1988.	
Leinster Shield	Regular Officer Training Plan (ROTP), the Reserve Entry Training Plan (RETP) squadron amassing the most points in the Commandant's Competition, with events involving military, athletic and academic prowess.	Leinster plate donated to RMC museum	
MacArthur Leadership Award	cadet who demonstrates outstanding leadership performance based on credo of Duty-Honour-Country and potential for future service in the profession of arms.	General Douglas MacArthur	
Mike Allen Memorial Trophy	annual alumni water polo game	15708 Capt Mike Allen Trophy (RMC 1987)	
Jack C. Sargant Memorial Scholarship	varsity athlete student who demonstrates proficiency in academic standing, sportsmanship, leadership, and athletic ability.	3091 Jack J.C. Sargant (RMC 1953)	
Outstanding Athlete Award	Awarded to those cadets whose athletic performance has been clearly recognized as outstanding not only against the immediate intercollegiate competition, but also at the national intercollegiate level or its equivalent in provincial, national or international events.		
Pijper Cup	overall winner of the Ex cadet vs Cadet sports challenge on ex cadet (Reunion) weekend	12609 Thomas A Pijper (RMC 1980)	
Sword of Distinction for Leadership	graduating ROTP/RETP cadet who displays outstanding leadership through attaining the highest Cadet appointment of Cadet Wing Senior (CWS) in their graduating year.	N/A	
Sword of Honour	graduating ROTP/RETP cadet who best combines high standards of proficiency in each of the four components of the RMC programme.	N/A	
Victor Van der Smissen-Ridout Memorial Award	graduating ROTP/RETP cadet deemed to stand highest morally, intellectually, and physically at RMC.	Captain William Henry Victor Van der Smissen (KIA 1916) and 2415 W.L. Ridout (RMC 1934) (KIA 1934)	
Wheatley Challenge Cup	overall winner of the annual Harrier Run	4252 MGen (Ret'd) Howard HR Wheatley (RRMC RMC 1958)	
Whitaker Cup	awarded annually to the top Team Captain of a RMC varsity sports team.	Brigadier-General Denis Whitaker	
J. Douglas Young Sword of Excellence	Cadet Squadron Senior (CSS) of the Squadron winning the Commandant's Competition.	2360 Major John Douglas (Doug) Young (RMC 1937) who was KIA on D-Day	
Tommy Smart Cup	Awareded since 1927, Tommy Smart Cup salutes the Best All Round Gentleman Cadet at Royal Military College of Canada in Athletics.jpg	Officer Cadet 1716 Thomas William Smart died in an accident on the RMC football field in 1926.	

== Other articles ==
- RMC Hockey History Digest, Eds. S125 Major (Ret) William WJ Oliver and S134 Mrs Rolande Oliver, Red & White Books, Kingston, 2003

== See also ==
- List of Royal Military College of Canada people
- U Sports.
