= Precision (march) =

Song
- Written: 1932
- Published: 1941
- Genre: March
- Composer: Denise Chabot
- Lyricist: Thomas Fraser Gelley

Precision is the authorized march of Royal Military College of Canada. The RMC band performs Precision during parades and march pasts, as well as on Ex-Cadet Weekends.

== History ==
Precision was composed in 1932 by Denise Chabot, wife of Major C. A. Chabot, a Royal Canadian Artillery officer on staff as professor of French at the College at the time. She earned the degree of Associate of the Royal Conservatory of Music and was the president of the Kingston Music Club.

Precision was inspired by "Madelon", one of the popular marching songs sung and whistled by the cadets marching on their way to the Riding School, and the favourite song of the Class of 1932. Mme Chabot improvised a variation on the song, to represent the cadence of the cadets on the march. The composition starts, “We are the gentlemen cadets of RMC We have sworn to love and serve Her Majesty…”

The as-yet untitled composition was presented to RMC in the spring of 1932, it was orchestrated for military band by Captain F. W. Coleman of the Royal Canadian Horse Artillery.

In the fall of 1933 the Associated Screen News Ltd. made a full-length feature “Precision” (1933) film, “A sample look at discipline at the Royal Military College. The emphasis is on precision gymnastics displays, ceremonial battalion marches in full uniform, and the changing of the sentry demonstrated by gentlemen cadets of the College. Seen is the exterior of the RMC buildings (the Stone Frigate)." Mme Chabot found the name fitting and in 1933 called her composition by the same title.

== Lyrics ==
The College will, when the occasion calls for it, sing along to Precision. Professor Tom F. Gelley, also of the College Staff, composed words in 1932 to fit the spirit expressed in the College motto, "Truth, Duty, Valour" and measure of the music. The title "Heads Up" was a hockey expression. The work was presented to the College through the then B.S.M., J. G. Carr, and was accepted by the then Commandant, Major-General W. H. P. Elkins. The lyrics by Professor Thomas Fraser Gelley, of the College Staff, were published in the R.M.C. Review in 1941.

The lyrics have been altered over time. In the late 1950s the 3rd verse, “And strive to keep our Empire’s unity” became “And strive to keep our country’s unity”; and in the 4th verse, “For Canada and for our Empire great” became: “For Canada our land both broad and great”.

Since 1980, the 3rd verse, “We are the gentlemen cadets of RMC” was changed to “We are the officer cadets of RMC”.

== See also ==
- Authorized marches of the Canadian Forces
