= Church parade =

Church parade by military personnel

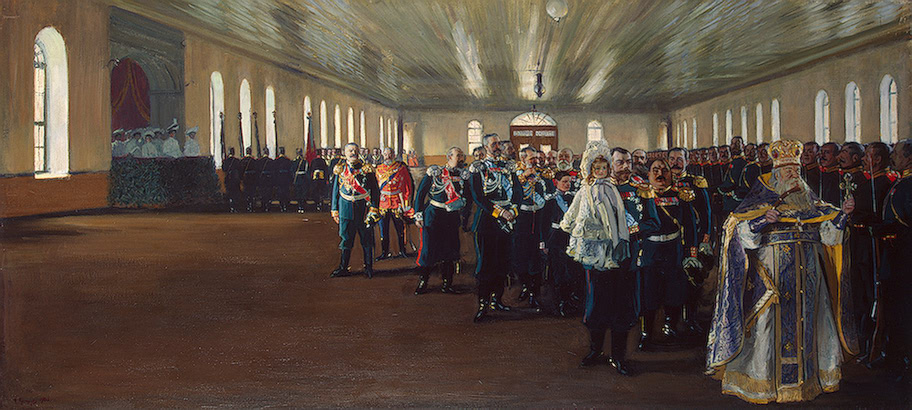
Church parade of the Finland Guards Regiment (Russian Imperial Army), December 12, 1905 (Julian calendar)

A church parade is a military parade by service personnel or members of a uniformed organization for the purposes of attending religious services.

== United Kingdom ==
In October 1946 after debate in Parliament, the then–King’s Regulations paragraph 1605 was amended to read that "officers and soldiers will not be ordered to attend a religious service or to parade before a service or on returning from it".

In 1949 the issue was brought back to the table by the Church, and after six years of debate and consultation, it was written into the new 1955 Queen's Regulations.

In the Queen's Regulations it states: "J5.264. Sympathetic consideration is to be given to the needs of officially recognized religious minorities who do not profess the Christian faith. No one is to be compelled to attend divine service against his wishes (except as provided in para 5.268). All personnel of the armed forces under the age of 17 years may be ordered to attend divine service of their own denomination". There are 5 sub sections in para 5.268. Sub-section e states: "Parades are not to be ordered in connection with divine service except that a CinC or GOC may order a parade which includes a religious service on special occasions of national or local importance. No officer or soldier on such a parade is to be compelled to take part in a service of any denomination other than his own or in any joint service. In special circumstances, authority to order such a parade may be delegated to local commanders".

Military chaplains depended on a church parade to speak to the entire military formation.
