= Pipe banner =

Decorative flag for the Scottish Highland bagpipes

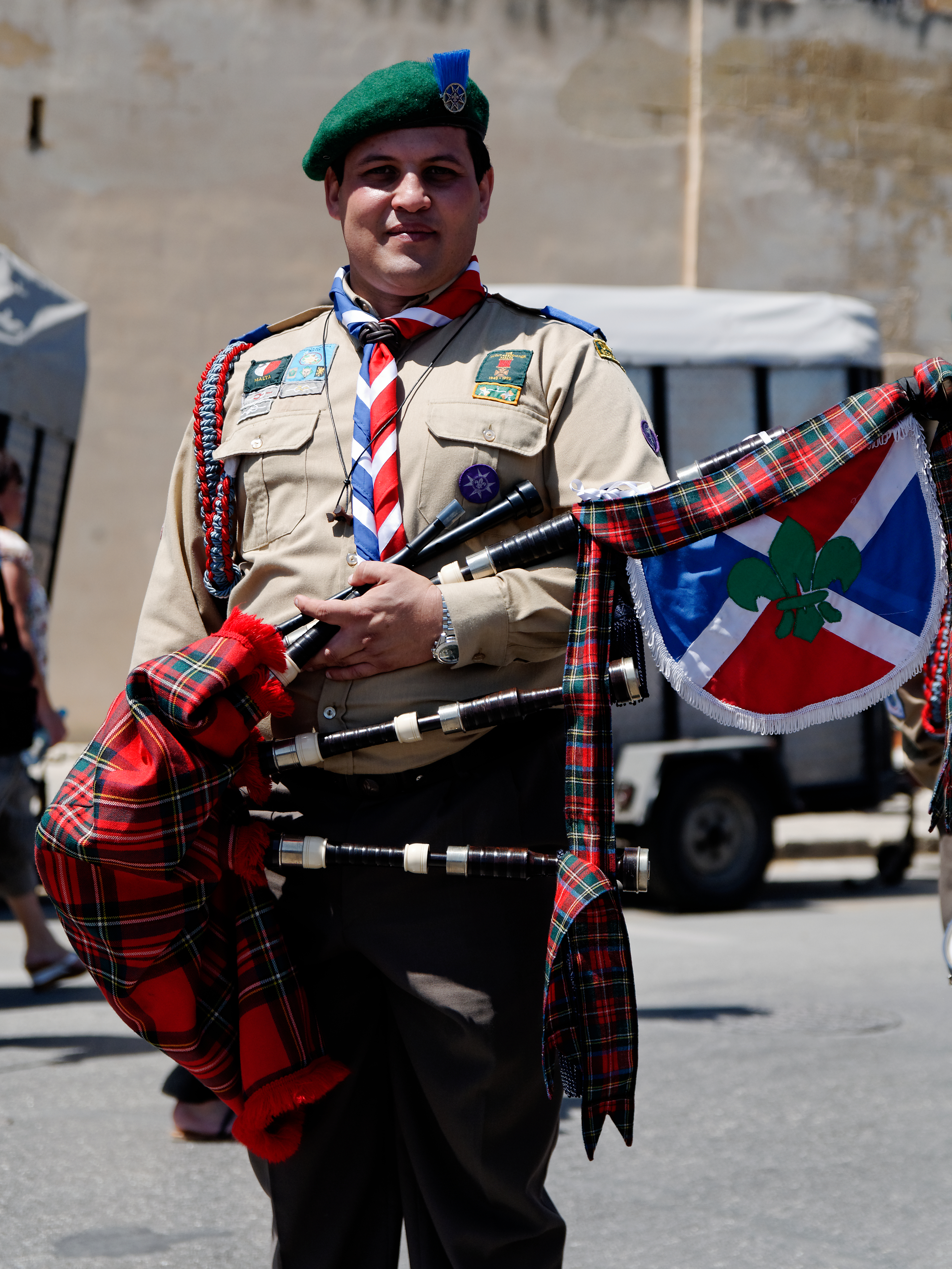
A Malta Scout bagpiper with pipe banner

A pipe banner is a decorative flag for the Scottish Highland bagpipes. It is used when a piper performs at high-profile or State occasions where the pipe banner will be tied to the bass drone of her or his bagpipes. It is a rather expensive handmade item embroidered with bullion threads.

Although pipe banners are widely used by pipe bands of military, uniformed and even civilian origins around the world, they are most commonly displayed in the United Kingdom and Commonwealth countries. For a civilian pipe band, its pipe banners would normally feature the crest or coat of arms of a Scottish clan to which the band is affiliated. For military or para-military pipe bands, their banners usually feature different combinations of the following:

- The crest of the regiment or police force to which the band belongs
- For bands in the British Army, a small Scottish or perhaps Union Flag at the corner of the pipe banner
- Crests of predecessor regiments that form the present regiment to which the band now belongs
- Battle honour crests, for instance, the crest of an elephant denotes a regiment's service at the Battle of Assaye in 1803
- The coat of arms of the town and/or city in which the regiment takes residence
- Coats of Arms of cities and towns that have granted the regiment the Freedom of the City. That is, the regiment has the right to march in those cities with arms and bayonets fixed.

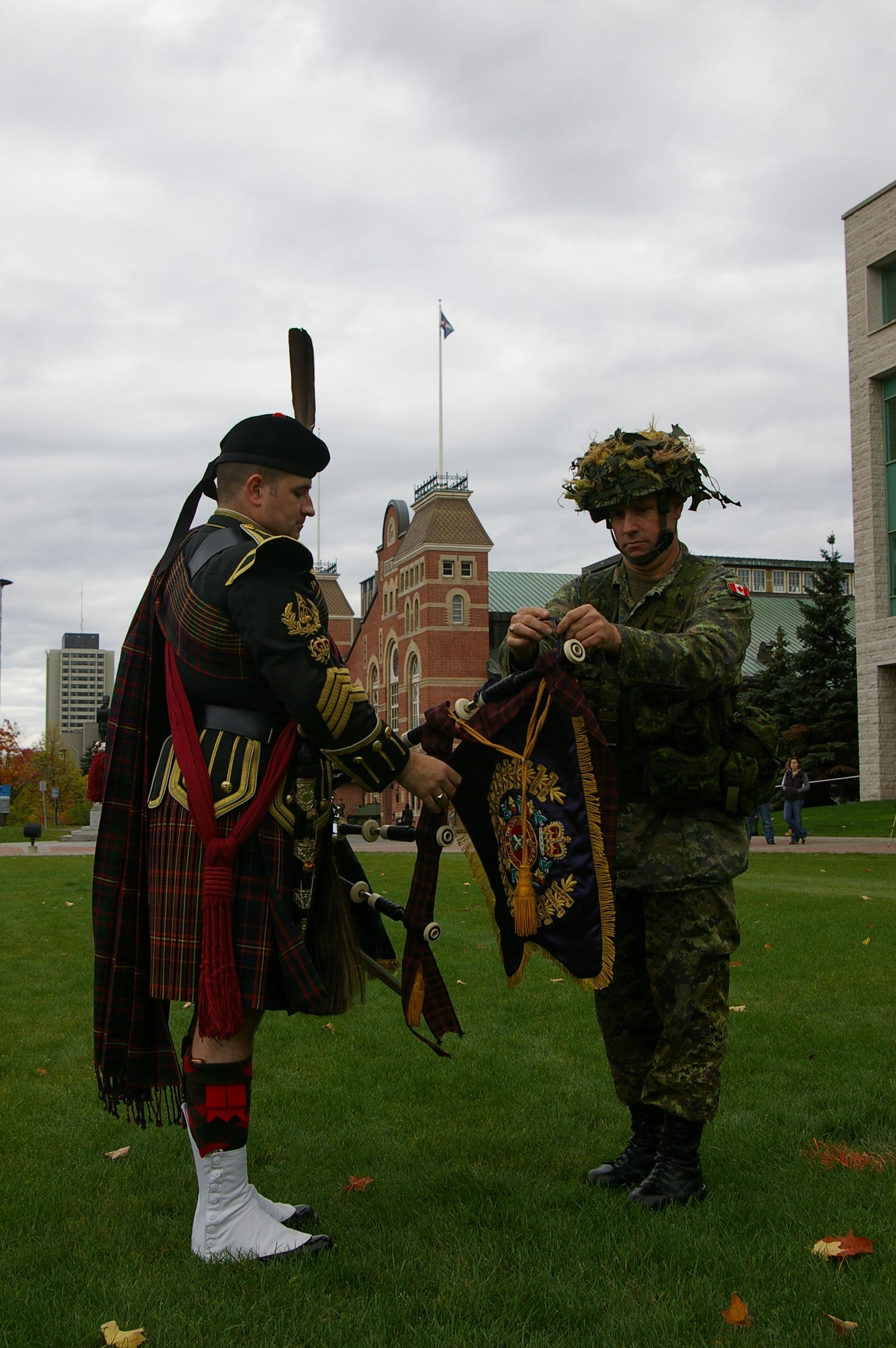
Lieutenant Colonel Bud Walsh Presents Pipe banner to Pipe-Major Alan Clark of The Pipes and Drums of The Cameron Highlanders of Ottawa, October 2007.

In addition, pipe bands of Scottish regiments in the British Army usually have designated pipers for each individual company in the regiments. In such case, there will also be company pipe banners that feature each infantry company's badge and these banners are only carried by the companies' pipers. Such regimental banners follow heraldic custom and practice in accordance with the regulations laid down by the Lord Lyon King of Arms in Scotland. Furthermore, a battalion's Commanding Officer may have his own piper as well, and in this case, there might also be a special pipe banner for this piper. In some regiments, it is customary for officers to donate pipe banners to their regiment's pipers at the time of their retirement.

Pipe banners may also be presented to a pipe band at a special occasion. For instance, it is not uncommon that a sponsor or dignitary would present a special pipe banner to a regiment or police force on its centenary celebration. While pipe banners are not accorded the same status in the military as regimental or King's or Queen's colours, they are, however, considered to be important due to their historical values and their associations with authoritative establishments as well as in heraldic law. Some regiments would even keep their pipe banners in their officers messes alongside their colours when the banners are not in use.
