= Original Hockey Hall of Fame =

Coordinates: 44.275°N 76.568889°W

- Former name: International Hockey Hall of Fame and Museum
- Established: 1943
- Location: Invista Centre, Kingston, Ontario
- Type: Museum
- Director: Mark Potter (President)
- Curator: Mike Postovit
- Website: originalhockeyhalloffame.com

The Original Hockey Hall of Fame, formerly the International Hockey Hall of Fame (IHHOF) is a museum dedicated to the history of ice hockey in Canada, located in Kingston, Ontario, Canada. The IHHOF was intended to be the original Hall of Fame for hockey, but events led to the establishment of the Hockey Hall of Fame in Toronto, Ontario instead. A dedicated building was opened in 1965, and eventually also hosted exhibits for the International Ice Hockey Federation (IIHF) from 1992 to 1997, prior to the establishment of the IIHF Hall of Fame. The IHHOF was renamed the Original Hockey Hall of Fame in 2013, and now focuses on the history of the sport, and emphasis on the role people from Kingston had in its development.

== History ==
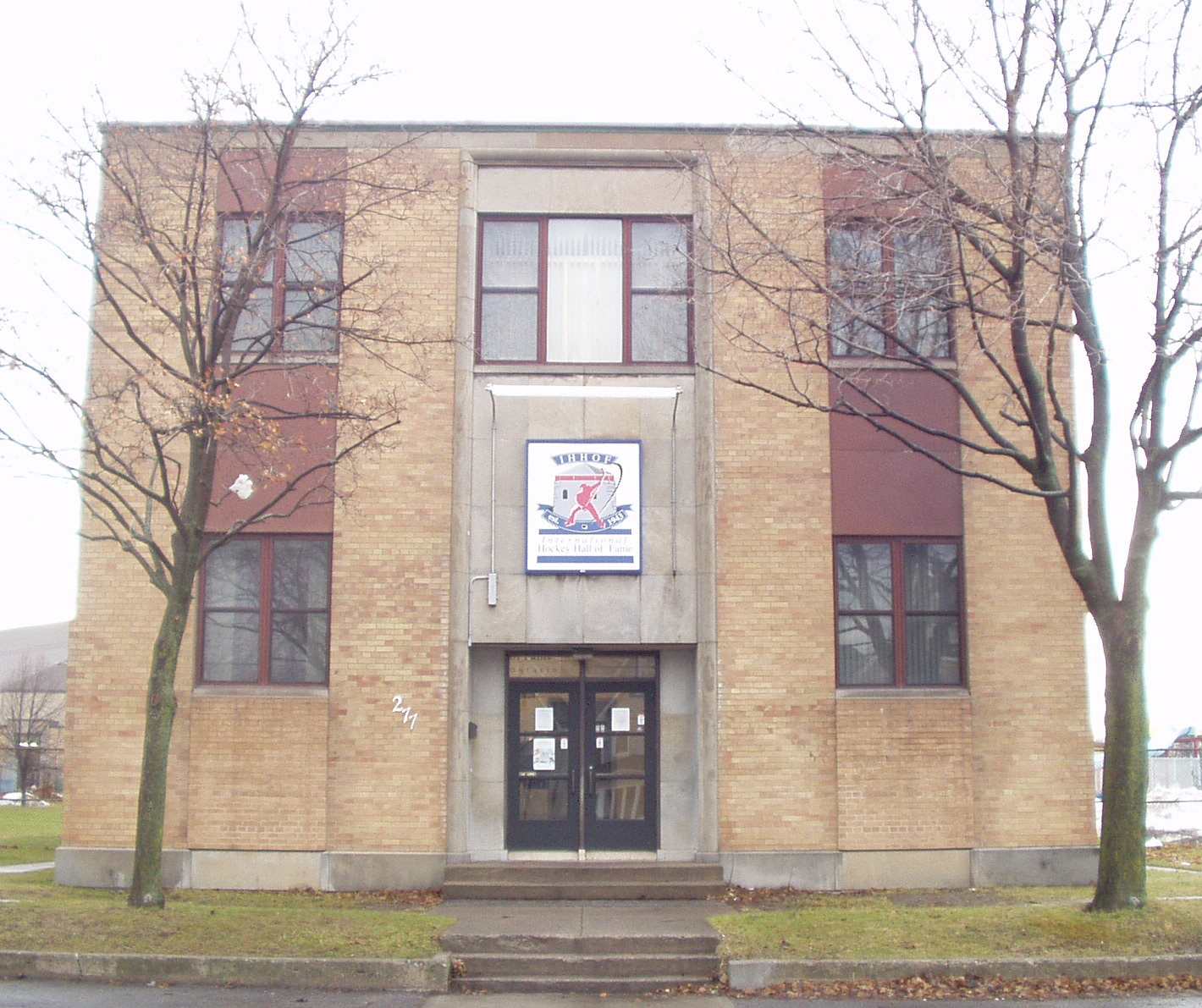
The International Hockey Hall of Fame's former home from 1965 to 2012.

The International Hockey Hall of Fame was founded on September 10, 1943, and incorporated as a non-profit charitable organization by the National Hockey League and the Canadian Amateur Hockey Association (CAHA). It was established through the efforts of James T. Sutherland, a former president of the CAHA and the Ontario Hockey Association, who sought to establish it in Kingston because he believed that the city was the birthplace of ice hockey. In 1943, the NHL and CAHA reached an agreement that a Hall of Fame would be established in Kingston. On April 17, 1945, the CAHA arranged to give 25 per cent of its annual proceeds towards building a facility for the IHHOF. CAHA secretary George Dudley expected that amount to be $4,000 to $5,000. The first players were inducted on April 30, 1945, although the IHHOF still did not have a permanent home.

Kingston lost its most influential advocate as permanent site of the Hockey Hall of Fame when Sutherland died in 1955. By 1958, the IHHOF organizers had still not raised sufficient funds to construct a permanent building in Kingston. Clarence Campbell, then President of the NHL, grew tired of waiting for the construction to begin and withdrew the NHL's support, subsequently reaching an agreement with the Canadian National Exhibition to establish a new Hall of Fame building in Toronto. CAHA president Jack Roxburgh felt that there was no place for two halls of fame in Canada, and stated it was a "tragedy nothing was done" while Sutherland was alive. The CAHA formally withdrew its support of Kingston in January 1962, in favour of Toronto.

Despite this major setback, the Board of Directors of the International Hockey Hall of Fame moved forward. In 1962, a grant was awarded by the City of Kingston for the construction of a new building. In 1965 the International Hockey Hall of Fame moved into their new building adjacent to the Kingston Memorial Centre.

In 1990, the International Ice Hockey Federation (IIHF) negotiated a deal with representatives from Kingston, Ontario, to display IIHF memorabilia at the International Hockey Hall of Fame. IIHF director Roman Neumayer sought to make North American people aware of the history of ice hockey in Europe. He considered Kingston an ideal location for the proposed IIHF Hall of Fame, since like the city focused on amateur hockey similar to Europe rather than professional hockey. The IIHF agreed to loan its exhibits to the museum for a five-year period from 1992 to 1997, while a more permanent display was being planned. The IIHF delivered more than 4,000 items to the International Hockey Hall of Fame. Kingston City Council provided a CA$100,000 line of credit towards building a true international ice hockey museum. The partnership ended in 1997, when the IIHF withdrew. The IIHF cited the lack of progress made towards getting a new facility constructed in downtown Kingston, as the primary reason for terminating the agreement.

The hall is now located at the Invista Centre, and reopened in spring 2016, with new exhibits and multimedia presentations, including a film, The Cradle of Hockey, narrated by Don Cherry.

== Exhibits ==
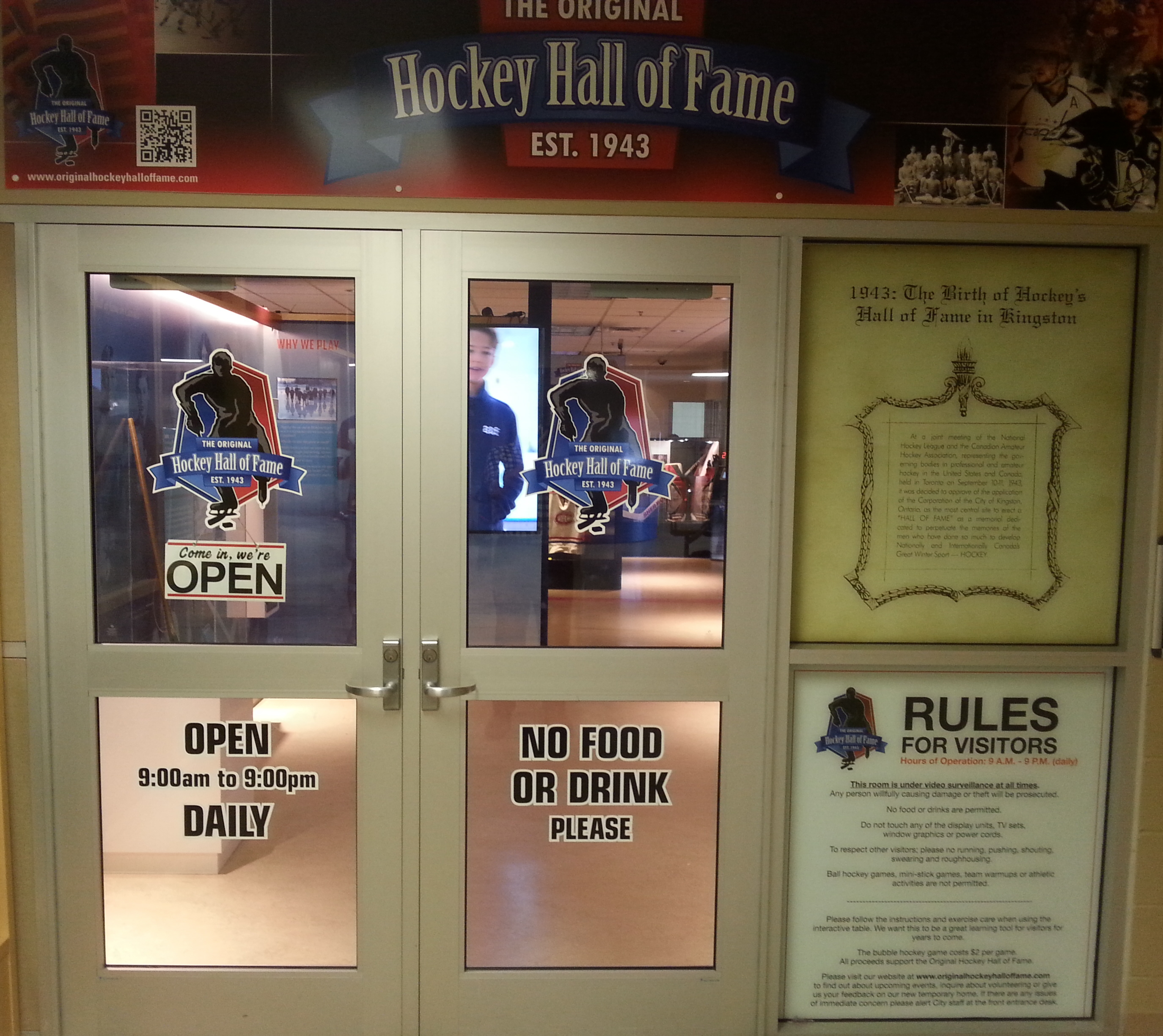
Entrance to the Original Hockey Hall of Fame, second floor of the Invista Centre in Kingston, Ontario.

The museum had two floors at their original home at 277 York Street. The first had exhibits about Bobby Orr, Don Cherry, the Original Six, Wayne Gretzky and others. The second floor had a display of the Hall of Fame's inductees, plus exhibits about Kingston and area professional hockey players, the World Hockey Association, and the evolution of ice skates and hockey sticks. Artifacts included jerseys worn by Gordie Howe, Rocket Richard and others, skates and sticks from the 1800s and the championship banner of the 1914 Toronto Blueshirts. Outside of the building was an oversized square puck.

== Inductees ==
The Hockey Hall of Fame inducted nine builders and 33 players, but only two since 1952 and none since 1966. The inducted members were all included as inductees to the Hockey Hall of Fame.

== Historic Hockey Series ==
Each February since 1969, the Hall of Fame presents its annual Historic Hockey Series. The series is both a competition and demonstration of the first organized hockey game played on the Kingston Harbour in 1886 between Queen's University and the Royal Military College of Canada. The original style hockey stick and uniforms, as well as the original rules of that era, are used including a square hockey puck, seven players per side and with no forward passing. Queen's University and the Royal Military College of Canada compete along with the 2nd Regiment from the Royal Canadian Horse Artillery from Petawawa who represent the garrison soldiers stationed in Kingston in the 1880s in a round-robin tournament. Since 2006, the series has been held on the outdoor rink at Kingston's downtown Market Square.

== Notable curators ==
- Bill Fitsell (1923–2020), Canadian sports journalist and historian
