= 1895–96 MHA season =

- League: Manitoba Hockey Association
- Sport: ice hockey
- Number of teams: 2

1895–96
- Champion: Winnipeg Victorias

MHA seasons
- ← 1894–95 1896–97 →

The 1896 Manitoba Hockey Association season was a series of five games contested by the senior ice hockey teams of Winnipeg Victorias and the Winnipeg Hockey Club. During the season, on February 14 the Victorias played a Stanley Cup challenge match in Montreal, defeating the Montreal Victorias. Winnipeg won 2–0 to win the Cup. This was the first time the Stanley Cup champion was from a league other than the Amateur Hockey Association of Canada. The Victorias won the season series to retain the Cup for the league.

== Season ==
=== Final standing ===
Team	Games Played	Wins	Losses	Ties	Goals For	Goals Against
Winnipeg Victorias	5	3	1	1	36	15
Winnipeg Hockey Club	5	1	3	1	15	36

Source: Winnipeg Tribune, Zweig lists awarded game as tie.

=== Schedule ===
Date			Score		Notes
Dec.	21	Winnipeg	4–4‡	Victorias	
Jan.	9	Winnipeg	0–4	Victorias	
Jan.	18	Winnipeg	1–8	Victorias	
Jan.	28	Winnipeg	4–15	Victorias	
Feb.	29	Winnipeg	6–6	Victorias	10:00 OT
Mar.	10	Winnipeg	1–5†	Victorias	

‡ Game awarded to Winnipeg when Armytage refused to accept a penalty.
† Exhibition

All games were played at the McIntyre Rink.

Source: Winnipeg Tribune

== Exhibitions ==
In January, the Winnipegs travelled to St. Paul, Minnesota, to play matches during the winter carnival. Winnipeg defeated St. Paul 18–2 and a Minneapolis ice polo team 7–2.

== Playoffs ==
There were no playoffs as the Victorias won first place exclusively.

== Stanley Cup challenge ==
=== Victorias vs. Winnipeg at Montreal ===
The first successful challenge to the Cup came in February 1896 by the Winnipeg Victorias, playing as the 1895 champions of the MHA. On February 14, Winnipeg beat the defending champion Montreal Victorias, 2–0, becoming the first team outside the Amateur Hockey Association of Canada (AHAC) to win the Cup. Winnipeg took a 2–0 lead on goals by Armytage and Campbell in the first half, then went on the defensive in the second half.

According to The Globe, in its report on the game:

"The westerners started in with a rush and scored the two games; one in ten minutes and one in nine minutes before the Vics seemed to waken up. For the rest of the first half, the honors were even. In the second half, the Winnipeggers were strictly on the defensive. Shot after shot was fired on their goal but the Vics could not score due to the superb work of Merritt, the visitor's goalkeeper. The match ended 2 to 0 in favour of the visitors. Both sides were dissatisfied with the work of Mr. Alexis Martin of Toronto as referee; claiming he was utterly ignorant of the rules, an opinion which seemed to be shared by the spectators."

Date	Winning Team	Score	Losing Team	Location
February 14, 1896	Winnipeg Victorias	2 – 0	Montreal Victorias	Victoria Skating Rink

Winnipeg at Montreal

Winnipeg	(2)	at	Montreal	(0)
George Merritt		G	Robert Jones	
Rod Flett		P	Harold Henderson	
Fred Higginbotham		CP	Mike Grant	
Jack Armytage	1	F	Robert MacDougall	
Colin "Tote" Campbell	1	F	Shirley Davidson	
Dan Bain		F	Ernie McLea	
Attie Howard		F	Reg Wallace	
		sub	Hartland MacDougall	

Referee - A. F. Martin, Toronto

=== First goal ===
Jack Armytage's biography at Manitoba Hockey Hall of Fame: "One of his greatest games was on February 14, 1896, in a sudden death game for the Stanley Cup when Jack Armytage scored the winning goal in 2-0 victory over Montreal; the first time the Cup came West."

The first goal of the game was scored by Jack Armytage, although Dan Bain's Hockey Hall of Fame biography lists Bain as the goal scorer. "On February 14, 1896, the team traveled east to try to strip the Montreal Victorias of their Stanley Cup. Bain scored the winning goal in the Westerners' 2-0 upset to claim the hallowed silverware." This is likely a misplaced reference to the 1901 challenge game for the Cup won 2–1 in which Bain scored both goals for Winnipeg, the second in overtime.

Newspaper accounts of the time list Armytage as the scorer, on a pass from Howard: According to the Winnipeg Tribune, in its report on the game: "It was rushed to the Montreal end where Howard lifted it from the corner to the front of the posts where Armytage was waiting and sent it through in 10 minutes." According to the Ottawa Journal, in its report on the game: "Armitage scored after 10 minutes of play on a pass from Howard."

== Winnipeg Victorias 1896 Stanley Cup champions ==
=== Players ===
Forwards

- Jack Armytage(Rower-Captain),
- Dan Bain(center),
- Colin "Tote" Campbell (Winger),
- Tom "Attie" Howard (Winger)
- Bobby Benson (F-Spare did not play)

Defencemen

- Rod Flett(point),
- Fred Higginbotham (cover point),
- Charles Johnston(cover point)

Goaltenders

- George "Whitey" Merritt
- John Jack Sheppard (played one game in regular season)

=== Coaching and administrative staff ===
- Edward B. Nixon (President),
- Able Code (Vice President/Manager),
- J. Carter (Mascot/Trainer).
- (Trainers first name is unknown.)

=== Stanley Cup engraving ===
- VICTORIAS
- -- of --
- WINNIPEG
- -- 1895 --
- -Note Winnipeg engraved 1895, because they defeated the 1895 champion before the 1896 hockey season was completed.

== See also ==
- 1896 AHAC season
- List of Stanley Cup champions
- List of pre-NHL seasons

Preceded by Montreal Victorias; 1895	Winnipeg Victorias; Stanley Cup Champions; 1896	Succeeded by Montreal Victorias; December 1896
Preceded by 1894–95	MHA seasons 1895–96	Succeeded by 1896–97
