= Dave Major =

Canadian ice hockey player

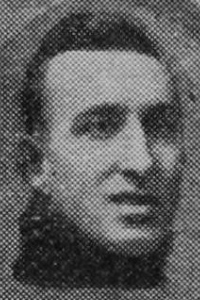
- Major with the Montreal Stars
- Born: July 7, 1893 Quebec, Canada
- Died: September 23, 1942 (aged 49)
- Position: Goaltender
- Played for: Montreal Canadiens
- Playing career: 1909–1922

Joseph David Major (July 7, 1893 – September 23, 1942) was a Canadian professional ice hockey player. He played with the Montreal Canadiens of the National Hockey Association.

Major also played with the Montreal Stars of the Montreal Hockey League (MHL) and during the 1914–15 season the team held the Art Ross Trophy, an amateur prize for teams not eligible to compete for the Allan Cup.
