= Whitey Merritt =

Canadian ice hockey player

George Merritt
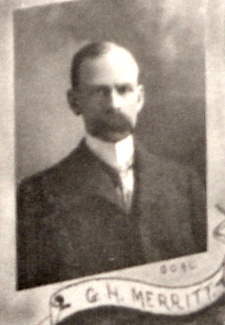
- Whitey Merritt in 1900.
- Born: December 29, 1869 Goderich, Ontario, Canada
- Died: May 31, 1916 (aged 46) Winnipeg, Manitoba, Canada
- Position: Goaltender
- Played for: Winnipeg Victorias
- Playing career: 1891–1900

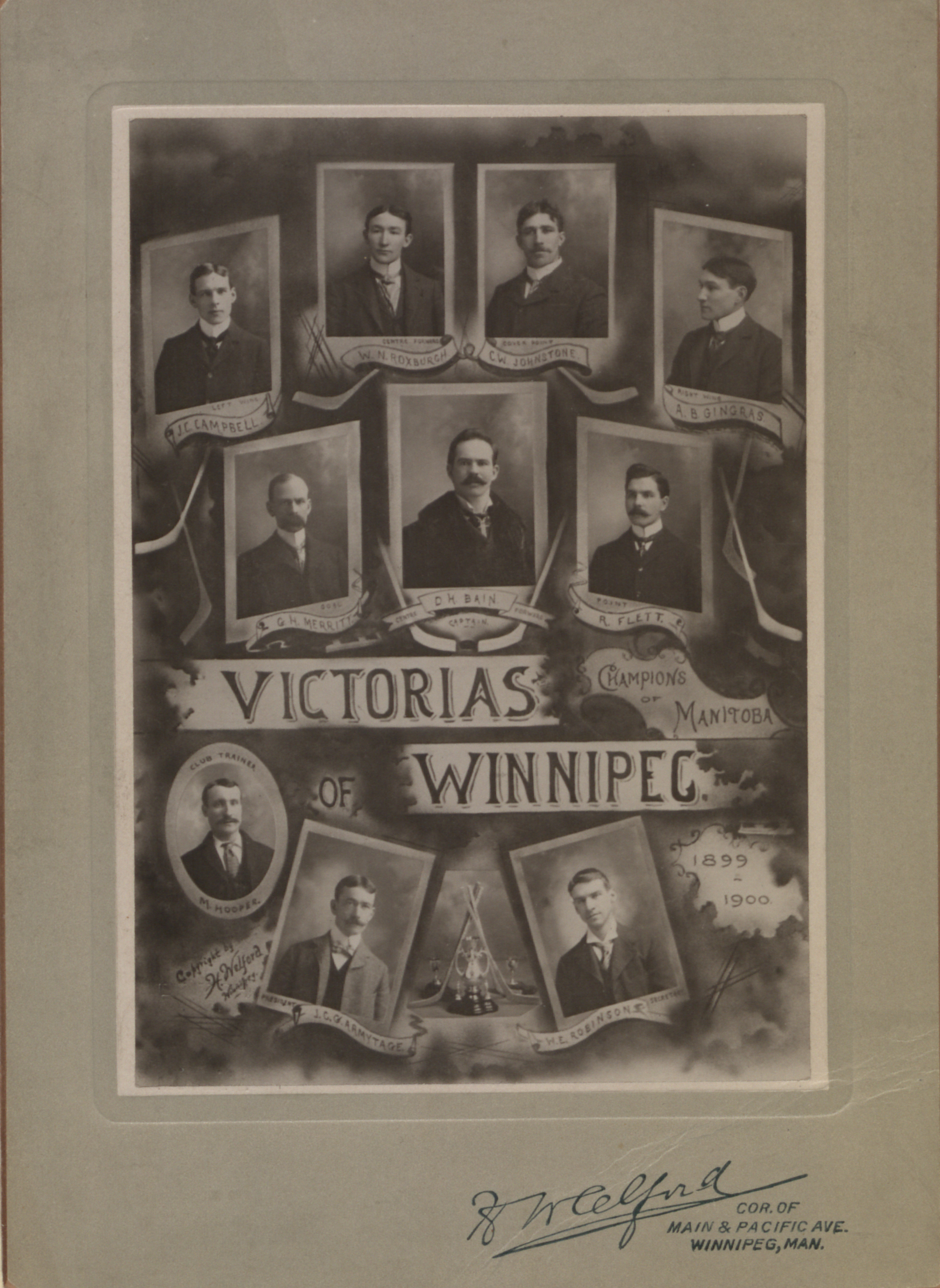
Whitey Merritt, at left in the middle row, with the 1899–1900 Winnipeg Victorias.

George Henry "Whitey" Merritt (December 29, 1869 – May 16, 1916) was a Canadian amateur ice hockey goaltender who played for the Winnipeg Victorias of the Manitoba Hockey Association during the last decade of the 19th century.

Whitey Merritt started out with the Winnipeg Victorias in the 1891–92 season as both a goaltender and a skater, but from the 1893–94 season and onwards he played exclusively as a goaltender. Merritt won a Stanley Cup with the Victorias in 1896. Amongst his teammates were Dan Bain and Jack Armytage.

Merritt was born in Goderich, Ontario in 1869 and died in Winnipeg in 1916.

== Awards and achievements ==
- Stanley Cup Championships – 1896 with the Winnipeg Victorias.
- First goalie to wear leg pads – Whitey Merrit put on a pair of cricket pads on February 14, 1896. He went on to win a shutout in a 2-0 game against the Montreal Victorias.
