= Leo Gaudreault =

Canadian ice hockey player (1902–1950)

- Born: October 19, 1905; Saint-Bruno, Quebec, Canada
- Died: March 21, 1950 (aged 47); Montreal, Quebec, Canada
- Height: 5 ft 10 in (178 cm)
- Weight: 150 lb (68 kg; 10 st 10 lb)
- Position: Left wing/Centre
- Shot: Left
- Played for: Montreal Canadiens
- Playing career: 1921–1937

Joseph Anne Leonard Gaudreault (October 19, 1905 – March 21, 1950) was a Canadian professional ice hockey forward. He played 67 games in the National Hockey League for the Montreal Canadiens over three seasons between 1927 and 1933. The rest of his career, which lasted from 1921 to 1937, was spent in the minor leagues.

== Biography ==
Born in Saint-Bruno, Quebec, the name Leonard, the birth year of 1902, and birthplace are confirmed with the Saint-Bruno Church records and Notre-Dame Basilica in Montreal holds the records of Cote De Neiges Cemetery where he is buried.

Although all his biographies state Leo Gaudreault was born in Chicoutimi, Quebec, he spent his early childhood in Saint-Bruno, Lac Saint-Jean, where his father, Pitre Gaudreault, managed the general store. The family moved to Chicoutimi in 1912.

Gaudreault died in 1950 in Montreal, Quebec.

== Career statistics ==
=== Regular season and playoffs ===
| | | | Regular season | | | | | Playoffs |
| Season | Team | League | GP | G | A | Pts | PIM | GP | G | A | Pts | PIM |
|---|---|---|---|---|---|---|---|---|---|---|---|---|
| 1921–22 | Chicoutimi Bleuets | QPHL | 5 | 1 | 0 | 1 | — | — | — | — | — | — |
| 1922–23 | Chicoutimi Bleuets | QPHL | 10 | 2 | 0 | 2 | 2 | 1 | 0 | 0 | 0 | ) |
| 1923–24 | Quebec Sons of Ireland | ECHA | 12 | 3 | 0 | 3 | — | 9 | 0 | 0 | 0 | 0 |
| 1924–25 | Montreal Nationale | MCHL | 6 | 2 | 0 | 2 | — | — | — | — | — | — |
| 1925–26 | Montreal Nationale | MCHL | 9 | 6 | 2 | 8 | 6 | — | — | — | — | — |
| 1926–27 | Montreal St. Francis Xavier | MCHL | 12 | 6 | 3 | 9 | 20 | 5 | 1 | 4 | 5 | 2 |
| 1926–27 | Montreal St. Francis-Nationale | MCHL | 10 | 6 | 4 | 10 | 14 | 1 | 1 | 0 | 1 | 4 |
| 1927–28 | Montreal Canadiens | NHL | 32 | 6 | 2 | 8 | 30 | — | — | — | — | — |
| 1928–29 | Montreal Canadiens | NHL | 11 | 0 | 0 | 0 | 4 | — | — | — | — | — |
| 1928–29 | Providence Reds | Can-Am | 28 | 2 | 0 | 2 | 45 | 6 | 0 | 0 | 0 | 14 |
| 1929–30 | Providence Reds | Can-Am | 39 | 7 | 12 | 19 | 64 | 3 | 1 | 0 | 1 | 0 |
| 1930–31 | Providence Reds | Can-Am | 40 | 22 | 20 | 42 | 44 | 2 | 1 | 2 | 3 | 8 |
| 1931–32 | Providence Reds | Can-Am | 40 | 13 | 15 | 28 | 22 | 5 | 1 | 0 | 1 | 6 |
| 1932–33 | Montreal Canadiens | NHL | 28 | 2 | 2 | 4 | 2 | — | — | — | — | — |
| 1932–33 | Providence Reds | Can-Am | 26 | 12 | 15 | 27 | 26 | 2 | 0 | 1 | 1 | 0 |
| 1933–34 | Providence Reds | Can-Am | 40 | 9 | 23 | 32 | 14 | 3 | 1 | 3 | 4 | 2 |
| 1934–35 | Providence Reds | Can-Am | 48 | 23 | 26 | 49 | 12 | 4 | 0 | 1 | 1 | 0 |
| 1935–36 | Providence Reds | Can-Am | 46 | 7 | 17 | 24 | 8 | 7 | 0 | 0 | 0 | 2 |
| 1936–37 | Minneapolis Millers | AHA | 42 | 8 | 15 | 23 | 20 | 6 | 2 | 5 | 7 | 2 |
| Can-Am totals | | | 307 | 95 | 128 | 223 | 235 | 32 | 4 | 7 | 11 | 32 |
| NHL totals | | | 67 | 8 | 4 | 12 | 38 | — | — | — | — | — |
