= Jimmy Roy (ice hockey, born 1895) =

Canadian ice hockey player

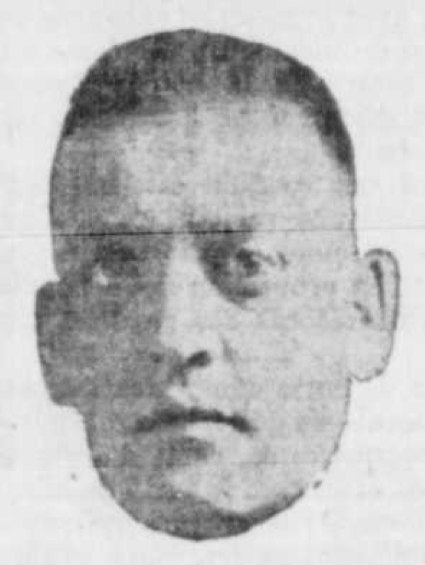
- Roy c. 1923
- Born: June 27, 1895; Chicoutimi, Quebec, Canada
- Died: September 25, 1926 (aged 31); Chicoutimi, Quebec, Canada
- Height: 5 ft 10 in (178 cm)
- Weight: 165 lb (75 kg; 11 st 11 lb)
- Position: Left wing
- Played for: Montreal Wanderers; Montreal Canadiens
- Playing career: 1913–1923

Dominique James Roy (June 27, 1895 – September 25, 1926) was a Canadian professional ice hockey player. He played with the Montreal Wanderers and the Montreal Canadiens of the National Hockey Association.

== Career ==
Roy tried out for the Montreal Wanderers in 1919 and received professional accreditation from the Amateur Athletic Unit. Following this, he applied to the Quebec Amateur Hockey Association for accreditation as an amateur player. As a result, the chairman of the Quebec Amateur Hockey Association warned that any amateur player that played against Roy would thus forfeit their amateur accreditation. However, since Roy had played one game with the senior amateur team Quebec Sons of Ireland, all players on both sides were suspended from amateur play. A few days later, on January 13, it was determined that Roy was forbidden from ever playing amateur hockey.
