= Claude C. Robinson =

Canadian ice hockey and sports executive (1881–1976)

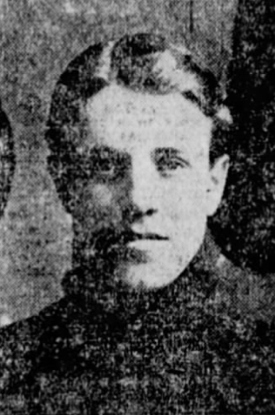
- Robinson with the Winnipeg Victorias
- Born: December 17, 1881; Harriston, Ontario, Canada
- Died: June 27, 1976 (aged 94); Vancouver, British Columbia, Canada
- Resting place: Forest Lawn Memorial Park
- Education: University of Manitoba
- Occupations: Businessman; civil servant
- Known for: Canadian Amateur Hockey Association; Manitoba Amateur Hockey Association; Winnipeg Victorias; Amateur Athletic Union of Canada
- Awards: Hockey Hall of Fame; Canadian Olympic Hall of Fame; Manitoba Hockey Hall of Fame; International Hockey Hall of Fame

Claude Copeland Robinson (December 17, 1881 – June 27, 1976) was a Canadian ice hockey and sports executive. After winning an intermediate-level championship as captain of the Winnipeg Victorias in 1905, he served as secretary-treasurer and as vice-president of the Victorias. He coached the Victorias to a Manitoba Hockey League championship in 1909, and felt that his team could have competed for the newly established Allan Cup, despite that challenges from senior ice hockey teams were accepted only from Eastern Canada at the time. The Victorias won the Allan Cup by default in 1911, when the Toronto St. Michael's Majors refused to play, then successfully defended four challenges for the trophy.

Robinson arranged subsequent challenges for the Allan Cup as an executive for multiple leagues, including the Winnipeg Amateur Hockey League. By the 1914 Allan Cup, multiple debates arose on the eligibility of players, and numerous challenges for the trophy were difficult to manage. After he suggested to establish a national body for governing hockey and advocated his ideas to amateur clubs across Canada, the Canadian Amateur Hockey Association (CAHA) was founded on December 4, 1914, with Robinson elected as secretary. He also helped establish the Manitoba Amateur Hockey Association in 1914, and later served as its vice-president. He remained a trustee for the Allan Cup until 1937, was a trustee of the Abbott Cup for junior ice hockey from 1919 to 1942, and was chairman of the CAHA finance committee from 1933 to 1937.

Robinson helped establish the Manitoba Amateur Athletic Association in 1907, and oversaw finances for the provincial track and field championships. He favoured an alliance between the CAHA and the Amateur Athletic Union of Canada (AAU of C), and opposed former professionals competing in amateur sports. He disagreed with the CAHA changing its definition of an amateur, which led to separating from the AAU of C in 1937. He served as treasurer of the AAU of C from 1919 to 1940, and was treasurer of the Manitoba Citizens' Olympic Committee to fund local athletes. He was the honorary assistant manager of the Canadian delegation to the 1932 Winter Olympics, and oversaw travel arrangements as the associate manager of the Canada men's national ice hockey team.

Robinson became the first life member of the CAHA in 1925, and was a life member of the AAU of C. When the CAHA had its silver jubilee in 1939, he was appointed to oversee the celebration, and Winnipeg was chosen as host in recognition of his work to establish the CAHA. In 1945, he was among the inaugural group inducted into the builder category of the Hockey Hall of Fame. He was also inducted into the International Hockey Hall of Fame, the Canadian Olympic Hall of Fame, and posthumously into the Manitoba Hockey Hall of Fame.

== Early life and family ==
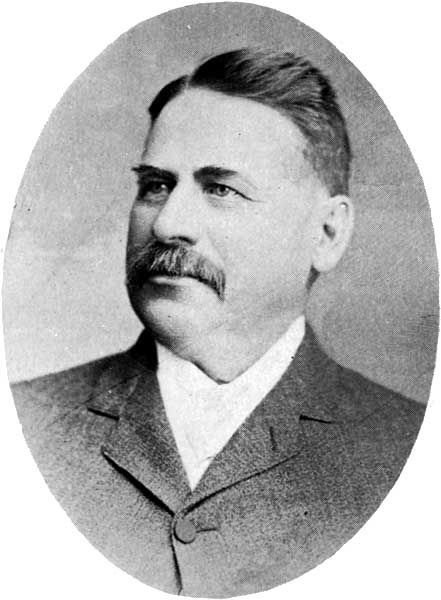
Thomas D. Robinson, c. 1902

Claude Copeland Robinson was born on December 17, 1881, in Harriston, Ontario. His parents Thomas D. Robinson and Elizabeth Copeland, had one daughter and four sons, and moved the family to Winnipeg in 1888. The elder Robinson was a businessman in coal and lumber industries, and established the T. D. Robinson and Sons Coal Company.

== Playing and refereeing career ==
Robinson earned a degree from Wesley College at the University of Manitoba in 1902. While a student, he played university hockey for the Manitoba Bisons, and Canadian football for Wesley College; and also refereed inter-collegiate hockey and football games.

Robinson played cover-point and rover for the intermediate-level Winnipeg Victorias from 1901 to 1905, and served as the team captain during the 1903–04 and 1904–05 seasons. Despite that he missed part of the 1904–05 season due to typhoid fever, the Victorias won the intermediate league. During the summers, Robinson rowed in the Winnipeg Rowing Club regatta in 1903 and 1904.

Robinson refereed inter-collegiate and intermediate-level hockey in Winnipeg c. 1902 – c. 1910. He also refereed in the Winnipeg Mercantile Hockey League and the Winnipeg Bankers' Hockey League from 1907 to 1909. During the 1908–09 season, he refereed games in the Manitoba Professional Hockey League, and the Fit-Reform Cup for the Western Canada championship.

== Ice hockey executive ==
=== Early career ===
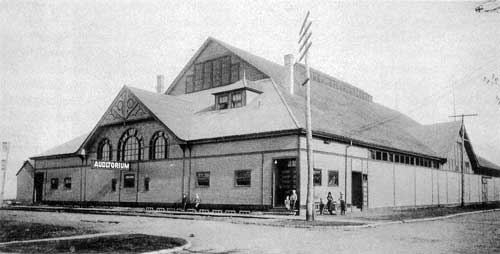
The Winnipeg Auditorium was the home ice rink for the Winnipeg Victorias.

The Western Canada Amateur Intermediate Hockey League elected Robinson its president for the 1903–04 season, while he played on the Winnipeg Victorias in the same league. At the 1904 annual meeting of the Victorias, Robinson was elected to the club's executive committee and delegated to establish an intermediate team in a local league. The club supported the intermediate team playing an exhibition tour in Western Canada on route to Edmonton. Robinson helped establish the Manitoba Amateur Intermediate Hockey League for the 1904–05 season, and was appointed its temporary secretary. He was subsequently elected president of the league, which adopted a two-referee system for its games.

Robinson was elected secretary-treasurer of the Victorias in 1905, then served for six seasons in the role until 1912. (Note: Robinson was elected secretary-treasurer for the 1905–06, 1906–07, 1908–09, 1909–10, 1910–11, and 1911–12 seasons. The Winnipeg Victorias did not operate a hockey team during the 1907–08 season.) He represented the Victorias at Manitoba Hockey League meetings, and argued in favour of maintaining the league's amateur status instead of embracing professionalism for the 1906–07 season. (Note: The Manitoba Professional Hockey League began playing during the 1906–07 season, including one team based in Winnipeg.) Robinson subsequently represented the Victorias in the Western Canada Amateur Hockey Association, which declined further competition for the Stanley Cup and established residency rules for players as of 1906. In April 1907, he represented the Victorias at meetings which established the Manitoba Amateur Athletic Association, (Note: The Manitoba Amateur Athletic Association was a provincial branch of the Amateur Athletic Union of Canada.) and set the requirements for amateur athletes in the province. Despite the new amateur sports organization, the Victorias did not play the 1907–08 season when professional hockey expanded in Winnipeg. (Note: The Manitoba Professional Hockey League added a second team based in Winnipeg as of the 1907–08 season.)

The Allan Cup trophy

In November 1908, Robinson helped establish a senior amateur hockey league in Winnipeg affiliated with the Manitoba Amateur Athletic Association, and negotiated for ice time with local arena operators. Along with Victorias's Jack Pratt, he reached an agreement with the Winnipeg Auditorium to grow amateur hockey in Winnipeg. Robinson coached the Victorias to a Manitoba Hockey League championship for the 1908–09 season, and felt that his team could have competed for the newly established Allan Cup, although challenges from senior ice hockey teams were accepted only from Eastern Canada at the time. He sought to reduce in-season expenses, to have money for an end-of-season trip for the players. To uphold the principles of amateurism, he did not provide players with any spending money on sightseeing trips to New York City and Boston.

When the Manitoba Hockey League declined to admit the Winnipeg Monarchs for the 1909–10 season based on expected calibre of play, Robinson then recommended that each team play exhibition games versus the Monarchs. During the 1910–11 season, Robinson served as secretary of the Manitoba Hockey League.

==== 1911 and 1912 Allan Cups ====
Allan Cup trustees accepted the challenge from Robinson and the Victorias, to play the Toronto St. Michael's Majors for the trophy, in Winnipeg from February 20–25, 1911. When the Majors refused to play by the deadline given, trustees awarded the 1911 Allan Cup to the Victorias by default. The Winnipeg Tribune wrote that the Majors had refused since the Ontario Hockey Association (OHA) executive wanted the games to be played in March, and that the OHA initially refused to surrender the trophy despite instructions from the trustees.

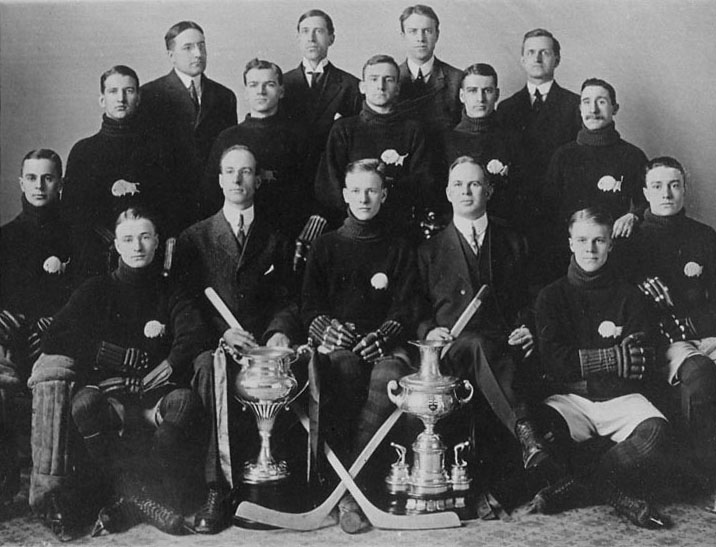
The Winnipeg Victorias with the Allan Cup in 1911

Robinson was asked by Allan Cup trustee William Northey, to schedule dates and referees to defend a challenge by the Kenora Thistles. The Victorias defeated Kenora by a combined score of 16–10 in a two-game series. The series profited approximately CA$1,500, which were donated by cup trustees to charities in Winnipeg chosen by Robinson. No further Allan Cup challenges were arranged for the season, despite proposals to play the Calgary Athletic Club and the Ottawa New Edinburghs.

In 1912, Robinson was named a trustee for the Allan Cup in Western Canada to oversee challenges for the trophy, and remained a trustee of the cup until 1937.

The New Edinburghs announced that the OHA agreed to return the Allan Cup to its trustees, and that the New Edinburghs would travel to Winnipeg to challenge for the 1912 Allan Cup. Robinson was surprised by the announcement, and had expected to arrange exhibition games with the New Edinburghs. No challenge from the New Edinburghs was approved for 1912, since the Ottawa district playoffs took too long to complete ruling out to travel to Winnipeg.

The Victorias won the 1911–12 Manitoba Hockey League regular season, then defended the Allan Cup in three challenges. Robinson's team defeated the Calgary Athletic Club by 11–0 and 8–6 scores in a two-game series, defeated Toronto Eaton's by 8–4 and 16–1 scores in a two-game series, and the Regina Capitals by a 9–3 score in a one-game challenge. In 1942, Robinson described the victory versus Toronto Eaton's as redemption for winning the trophy by default from the OHA.

==== 1912–13 and 1913–14 seasons ====
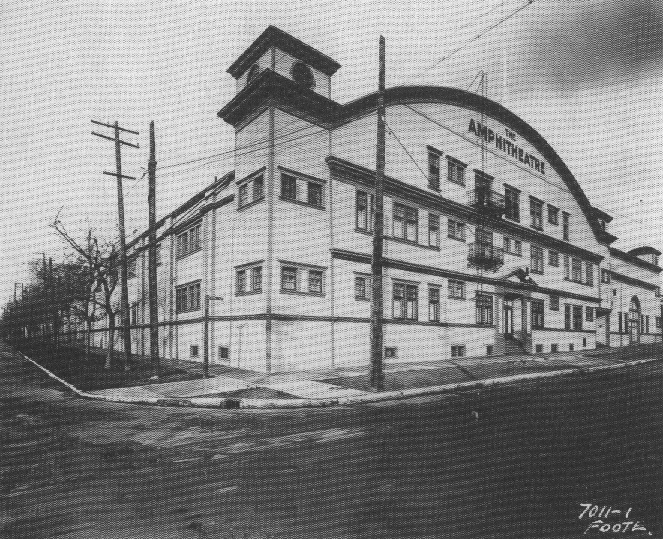
Winnipeg Amphitheatre

Robinson resigned as secretary-treasurer of the Victorias after seven seasons, due to time commitments and his business career, but remained the club's delegate to hockey league meetings. He was appointed to the Winnipeg Amateur Hockey League executive, and represented league at Manitoba Amateur Athletic Association meetings.

Contrary to the league's agreement to play all games at the Winnipeg Auditorium, the Winnipeg Monarchs led by Fred Marples sought to use the Winnipeg Amphitheatre as their home rink, claiming it had better amenities for players and spectators. Robinson noted that Auditorium's management agreed to make changes to suit the league's needs, and that all teams had signed the agreement to play there. He felt that it was too late to change venues, and suggested the Monarchs withdraw from the league if they disagreed. The Winnipeg Amateur Hockey League later voted in favour of keeping the arrangement with the Auditorium.

Robinson was elected vice-president of the Victorias in October 1913, serving in the executive role until 1917. (Note: Robinson was elected a vice-president of the Victorias in October 1913. He was re-elected in November 1914, and in December 1916. The Victorias suspended operations for the hockey team during the 1917–18 season.) He represented the Victorias at Winnipeg Amateur Hockey League meetings, and was re-elected to the league's executive which chose to operate with games at both the Auditorium and the Amphitheatre.

In January 1914, the Winnipeg Amateur Hockey League debated the status of the independent hockey leagues in Western Ontario and Manitoba, as to whether they were intermediate or senior-level leagues, and whether players in those leagues were eligible to be called-up to play. The issue stemmed from determining eligibility of reserve players for the Monarchs, who also played in those independent leagues.

==== 1914 Allan Cup ====
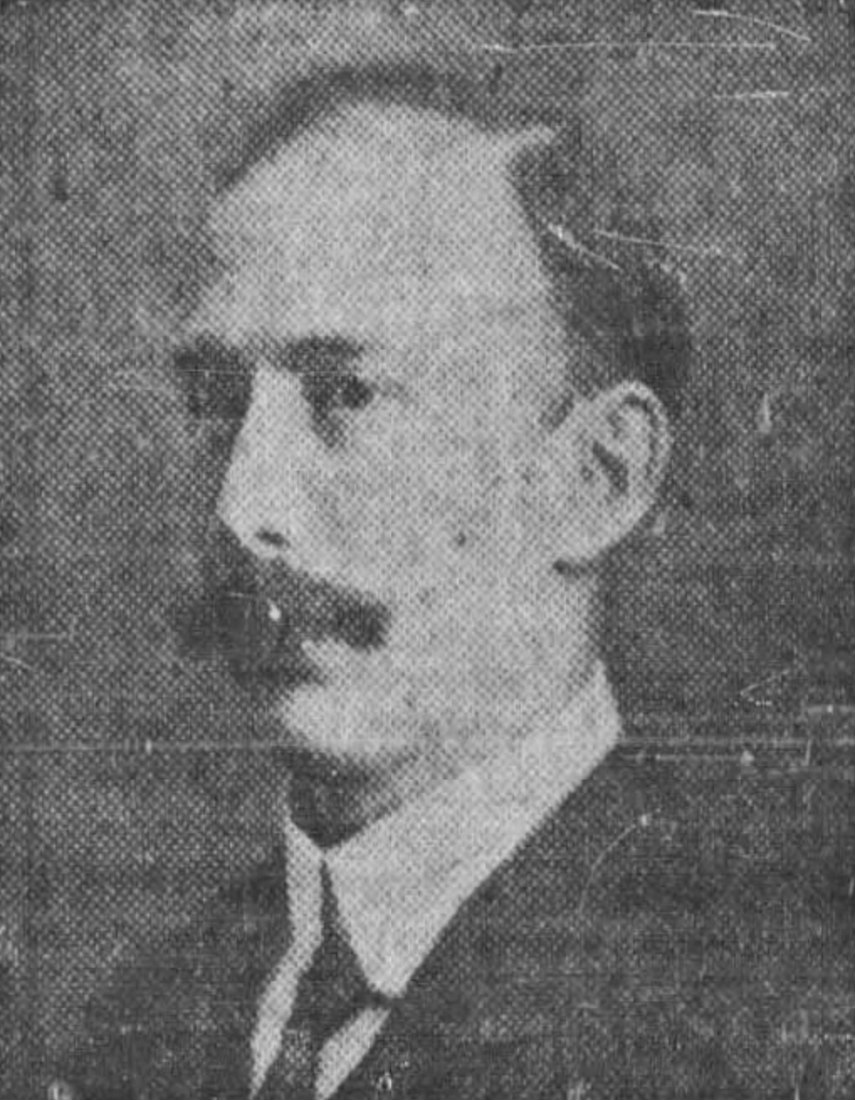
William Northey

By the 1914 Allan Cup, the numerous challenges for the trophy by league champions across Canada were difficult to manage. Robinson worked with Northey to schedule challenges, and decided that the defending champions would play a maximum of three challenges for the trophy per season. Robinson scheduled referees for Allan Cup games in Winnipeg, including a two-game total-goals series as the first challenge for the cup, by the Kenora Thistles versus the Winnipeg Monarchs.

Allan Cup trustees debated whether Dick Irvin was eligible to play for the Monarchs, since he had played a game for the Winnipeg Strathconas in the Independent League prior to the start of the Winnipeg Amateur Hockey League season. Northey asked Robinson for a copy of the constitution for the Independent League in which Irvin played. When Irvin was ruled ineligible, the Monarchs refused to play without him. Northey wrote that, since the Strathconas had an intermediate team associated with them, then the Strathconas could not also be an intermediate team for the Monarchs. Robinson noted that in 1913, trustees accepted that intermediate-level hockey was equal to senior-level hockey. After three days of negotiating, the Monarchs agreed to play without Irvin, in a one-game challenge versus the Thistles. The Monarchs won the Allan Cup by a 6–2 score.

Player eligibility was again questioned in the subsequent challenge for the Allan Cup. The Monarchs sought a ruling about a player from the Regina Victorias, who was reported to have played one game for a team in Melville, Saskatchewan, and possibly with other senior teams. Robinson investigated and sent his findings to Northey. Cup trustees ruled the player eligible, since the other league in which he played was not known to be senior level. The Regina Victorias defeated the Monarchs to win the Allan Cup, then defended the trophy in a series versus a team from Grand-Mère, Quebec.

=== Beginnings of the Canadian Amateur Hockey Association ===
==== Plans for a national body ====
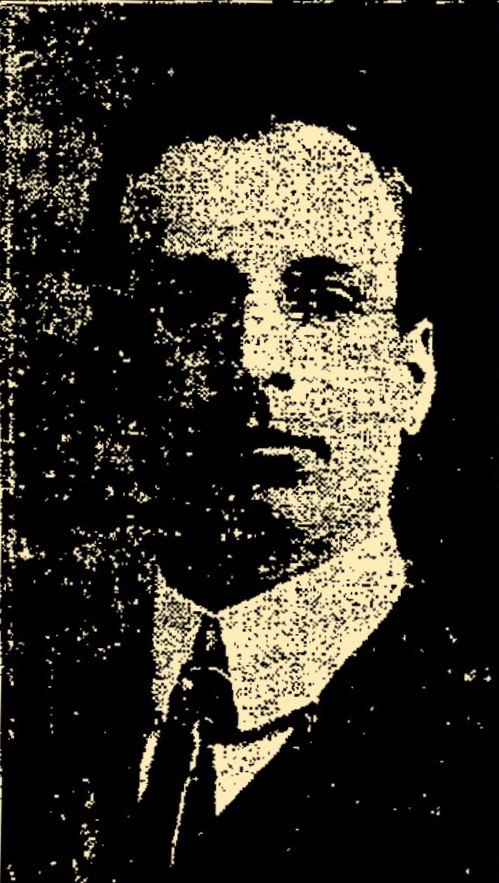
J. D. Pratt

Following the difficulties encountered during the 1914 Allan Cup, Robinson suggested establishing a national body for governing hockey. He travelled to Montreal and met with Allan Cup trustees, who reportedly had no desire to dictate disagreeable terms to the leagues wishing to compete for the trophy. Robinson later stated that trustees recognized flaws in the rules, and favoured establishing a national body.

In May 1914, the Winnipeg Amateur Hockey League endorsed establishment of a national body to govern ice hockey, standardize ice hockey rules, and set deadlines for competitions. J. D. Pratt, president of the Winnipeg Victorias, then mailed letters to amateur hockey officials in each province asking for contact information of all leagues and clubs playing senior hockey. The Winnipeg Amateur Hockey League subsequently met in June, and formed the Manitoba Hockey Commission to oversee hockey in Manitoba, which sought to merge into a national commission, as supported by clubs in Western Canada.

Robinson wrote letters to amateur clubs across Canada, advocating for a meeting to establish a national governing body for hockey. The stated purpose was to discuss revisions to the Allan Cup competition format and deadlines, to standardize rules of play, ice hockey rink dimensions, and for annual meetings to discuss national issues. The Winnipeg Tribune reported that a national body would also prevent players from jumping clubs. Robinson travelled to Ottawa to represent the Victorias at the meeting.

==== First national meeting ====
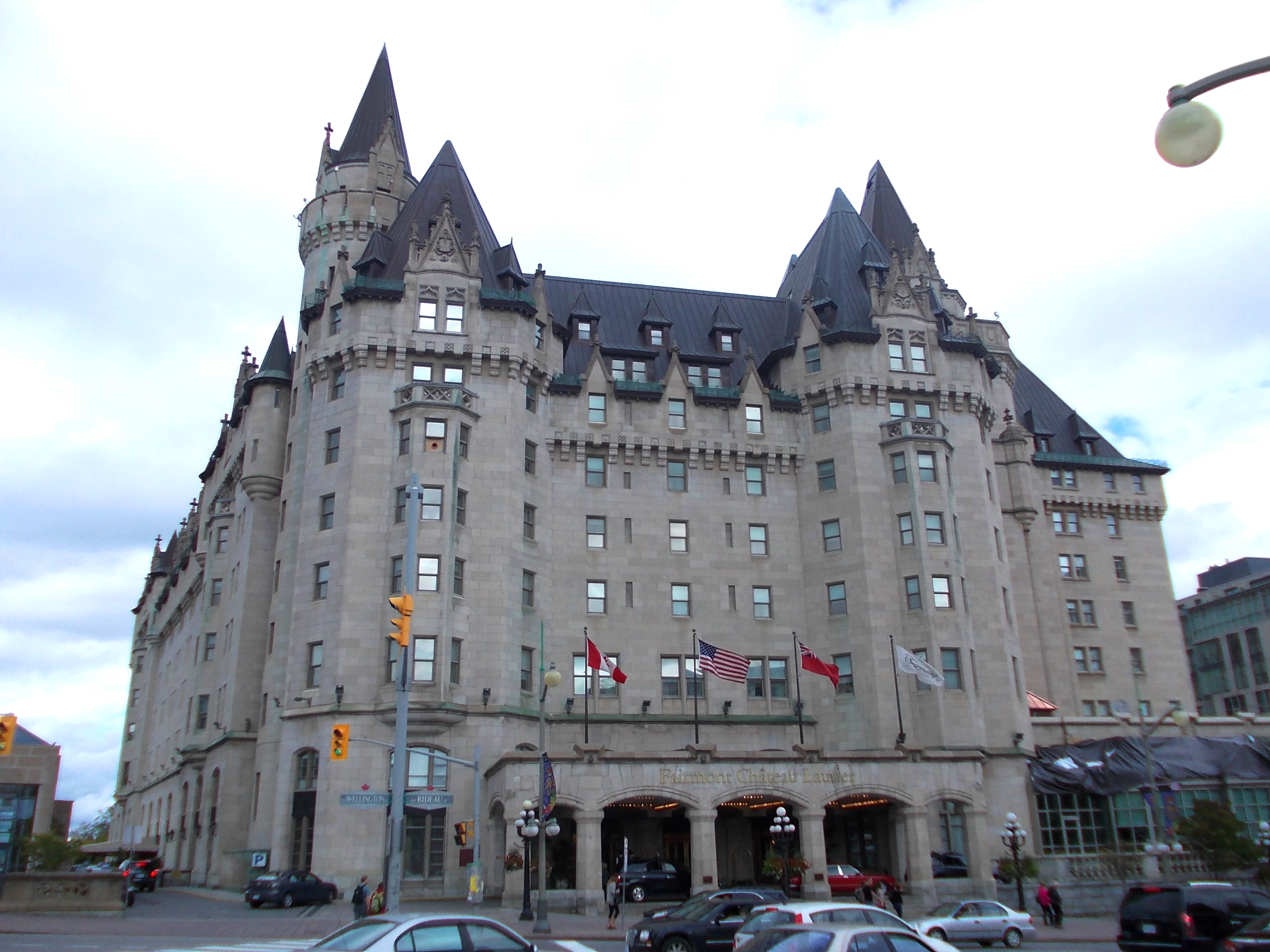
Château Laurier

The Canadian Amateur Hockey Association (CAHA) was founded on December 4, 1914, at the Château Laurier in Ottawa. Robinson was elected secretary for the 1914–15 season, and Winnipeg Amateur Hockey League president W. F. Taylor, was elected president. The constitution drafted by delegates from Manitoba and Saskatchewan was adopted with minor changes, and the CAHA established a three-month residency rule to be eligible to register with a team. Eight provincial branches were to be formed, with players required to register with one of the branches. The meeting also saw by-laws drafted, and agreement on a standard rink dimensions.

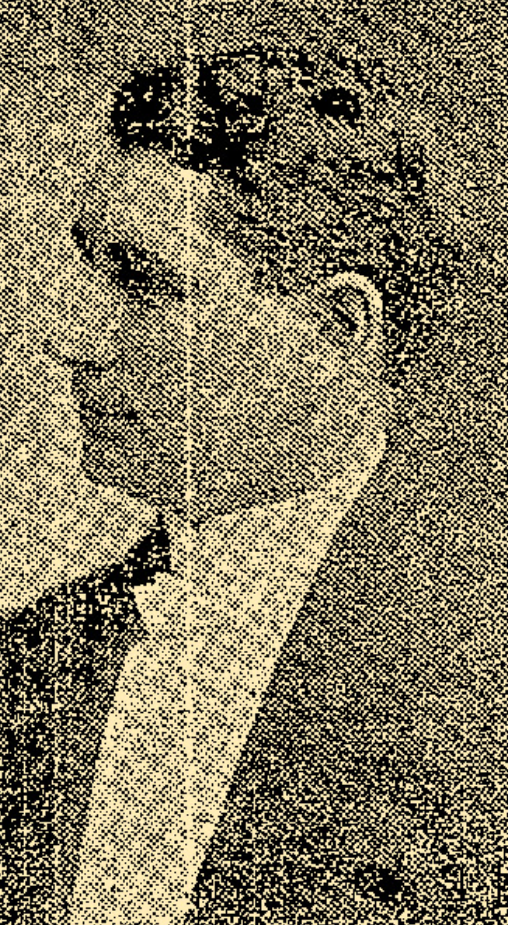
W. F. Taylor

The Allan Cup was recognized as the championship trophy of the CAHA for senior hockey, and standard playing rules were chosen for the trophy's playoffs. The format of the playoffs was changed from teams challenging the champion, in favour of provincial champions playing against each other until an east versus west final. The reigning champion was to play no more than two four-game series in defence of the trophy.

Robinson and W. F. Taylor met with Allan Cup trustee William Northey, to discuss the CAHA assuming control of the trophy. According to Northey, the Allan Cup could not be given outright to the CAHA as per the deed of gift from H. Montagu Allan, but the CAHA would continue to benefit from donation of its gate receipts to charities. Robinson remained an Allan Cup trustee, and helped oversee disbursement of profits from the Allan Cup playoffs to charities, and covering travel expenses of teams competing for the Cup.

Professional hockey interests were denied representation at the meeting, which coincided with the time and location of the annual general meeting for the Amateur Athletic Union of Canada (AAU of C). The CAHA was accepted as an affiliate two days later, then followed the AAU of C policies against professionalism to promote amateur sport.

When Robinson returned to Winnipeg, he expressed satisfaction in efforts to establish the CAHA, and the assured support of the Allan Cup trustees. He then sought for provincial hockey associations to be organized and adopt the CAHA's constitution and by-laws.

==== Early years ====
The 1915 Allan Cup was the first senior championship arranged under supervision of the new CAHA. The CAHA preferred to schedule home-and-home series for the playoffs, but Robinson stated that a one-game format could be used pending the weather or ice conditions. During the second challenge for the cup, the OHA sought to play by the residency requirements agreed upon when the CAHA was founded, whereas the Saskatchewan Amateur Hockey Association (SAHA) contested that residency requirements did not come into effect until the next season, and that players on the Melville Millionaires were eligible. Prior to the series, Robinson arranged a special CAHA meeting at the behest of the SAHA. Despite the disagreement, the Millionaires won the series against the OHA champion Toronto Victorias, then lost the subsequent challenge to the Winnipeg Monarchs.

Robinson and W. F. Taylor advocated for the CAHA to hold its first annual meeting prior to the 1915–16 season, despite concerns by provincial delegates that the World War I effort was more important. W. F. Taylor argued that the CAHA was too new to skip its first annual meeting, then Robinson conducted two mail-in votes which were inconclusive as to whether to hold a meeting. When some of the replies cited the cost of travelling, Robinson remarked that hockey was the only amateur sport which had "too much money" to spend on a meeting.

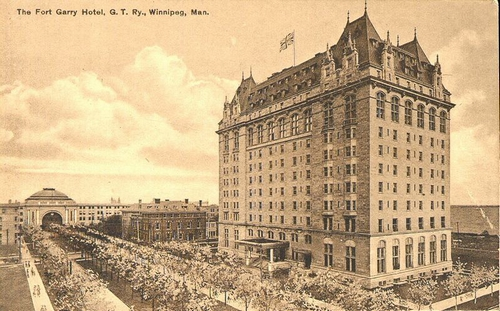
Fort Garry Hotel, c. 1913

Robinson arranged the CAHA's first annual general meeting at the Fort Garry Hotel in Winnipeg, in December 1915. The CAHA pledged to continue Allan Cup playoffs during the war, and made exceptions to residency rules for soldiers and students. The SAHA aired a grievance that Robinson and W. F. Taylor handled the dispute by a general meeting, rather than by an executive meeting. The CAHA noted discrepancies in constitution, and named Robinson to a committee to review the constitutions, such that each branch would coincide with the CAHA. At the end of the meeting, Robinson was succeeded as secretary by W. A. Hewitt of the OHA.

As the war continued, Robinson wanted to keep the CAHA functioning, even if mail-in votes were necessary instead of an annual meeting. He also felt that someone should be elected as president, to replace James T. Sutherland who was serving overseas with the Canadian Expeditionary Force.

=== Early years of the Manitoba Amateur Hockey Association ===
The Manitoba Hockey Commission changed its name to the Manitoba Amateur Hockey Association (MAHA), at its first annual meeting held before the 1914–15 season. Robinson remained a representative of the Victorias at Winnipeg Amateur Hockey League meetings. He was re-elected first vice-president of the league, which approved his motion to adopt all Allan Cup rules and player eligibility. The league supported formation of the Winnipeg Intermediate Hockey League for the second-tier teams of its clubs, and appointed Robinson chairman of the intermediate league.

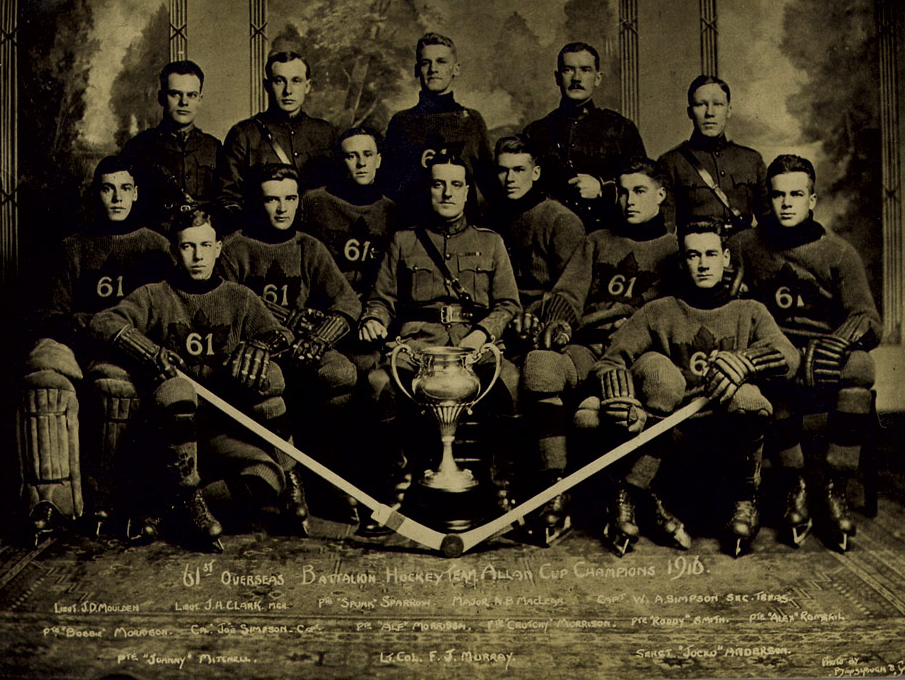
Winnipeg 61st Battalion with the Allan Cup in 1916

The Winnipeg Amateur Hockey League included teams composed of military personnel for the 1915–16 season, and raised funds to support soldiers and the war effort. The league was renamed to the Winnipeg Patriotic Hockey League, with Robinson as its vice-president.

The Winnipeg Monarchs were the defending Allan Cup champions, and protested when the Winnipeg 61st Battalion were chosen to defend the Allan Cup as league champions, since the Monarchs considered the patriotic games to be exhibitions. The MAHA subsequently upheld Robinson's decision that the 61st Battalion defend the Allan Cup. Robinson ruled that the OHA was too late in sending its champion to Winnipeg, and omitted the OHA from the 1916 Allan Cup playoffs. The Winnipeg 61st Battalion won the Allan Cup by defeating challenges from Fort William, Ontario and the Regina Victorias.

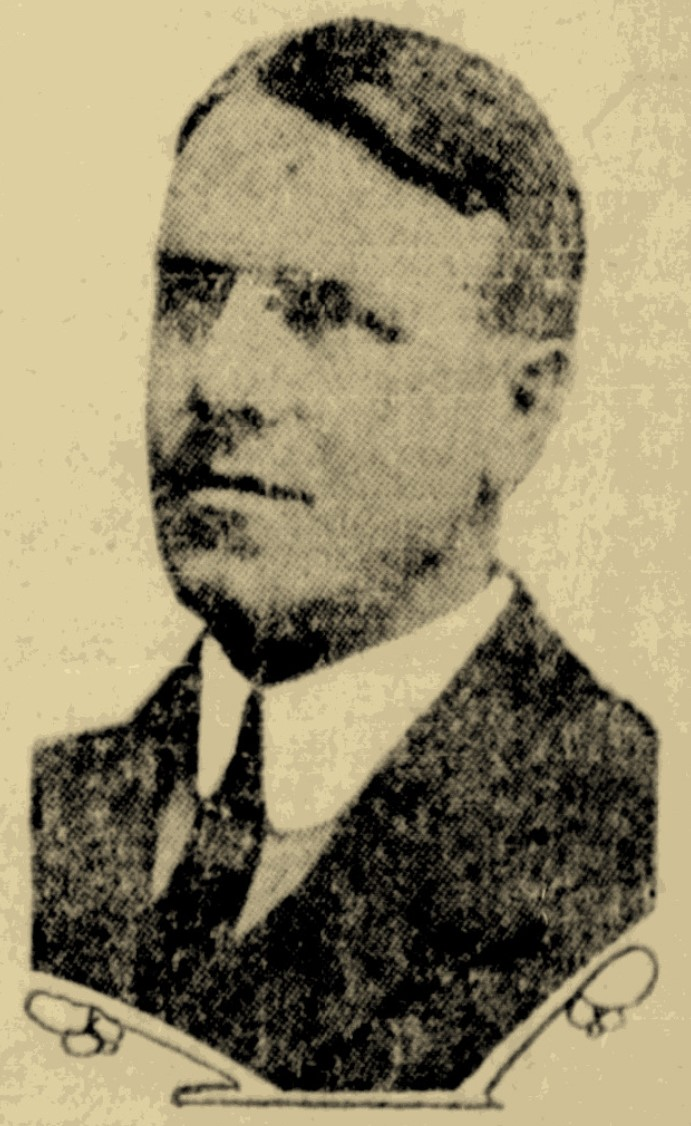
Robinson, c. 1917

Robinson was elected first vice-president of the MAHA in December 1916, and served on the executive committee of the Winnipeg Patriotic Hockey League. Upon a recommendation by Robinson, the Victorias suspended operations due to lack of hockey players during the 1917–18 season. He remained involved with Allan Cup affairs and accompanied the Winnipeg Patriotic Hockey League champions to Toronto for the final 1918 Allan Cup challenge.

During the 1918–19 season, Robinson sat on the protest committee of the Manitoba Hockey League, and represented the MAHA at the general meeting of the CAHA. In the following season, Robinson was named to the executive of the Winnipeg Hockey League, and a delegate to the Manitoba branch of the AAU of C.

In November 1921, Robinson was opposed to players from Winnipeg migrating to other cities, and chaired a meeting which sought to resurrect the Winnipeg Hockey League. He represented the Winnipeg Hockey League at MAHA meetings, and served on the MAHA executive committee. In the 1922–23 season, Robinson was elected first vice-president of the Winnipeg Hockey League.

=== Post-war Canadian hockey and the 1920s ===
Robinson represented the CAHA at AAU of C meetings, and served as chairman of the national registration committee for the AAU of C from 1920 to 1922. (Note: Robinson was appointed chairman of the national registration committee of the Amateur Athletic Union of Canada in January 1920, and was re-appointed in December 1920, and December 1921.)

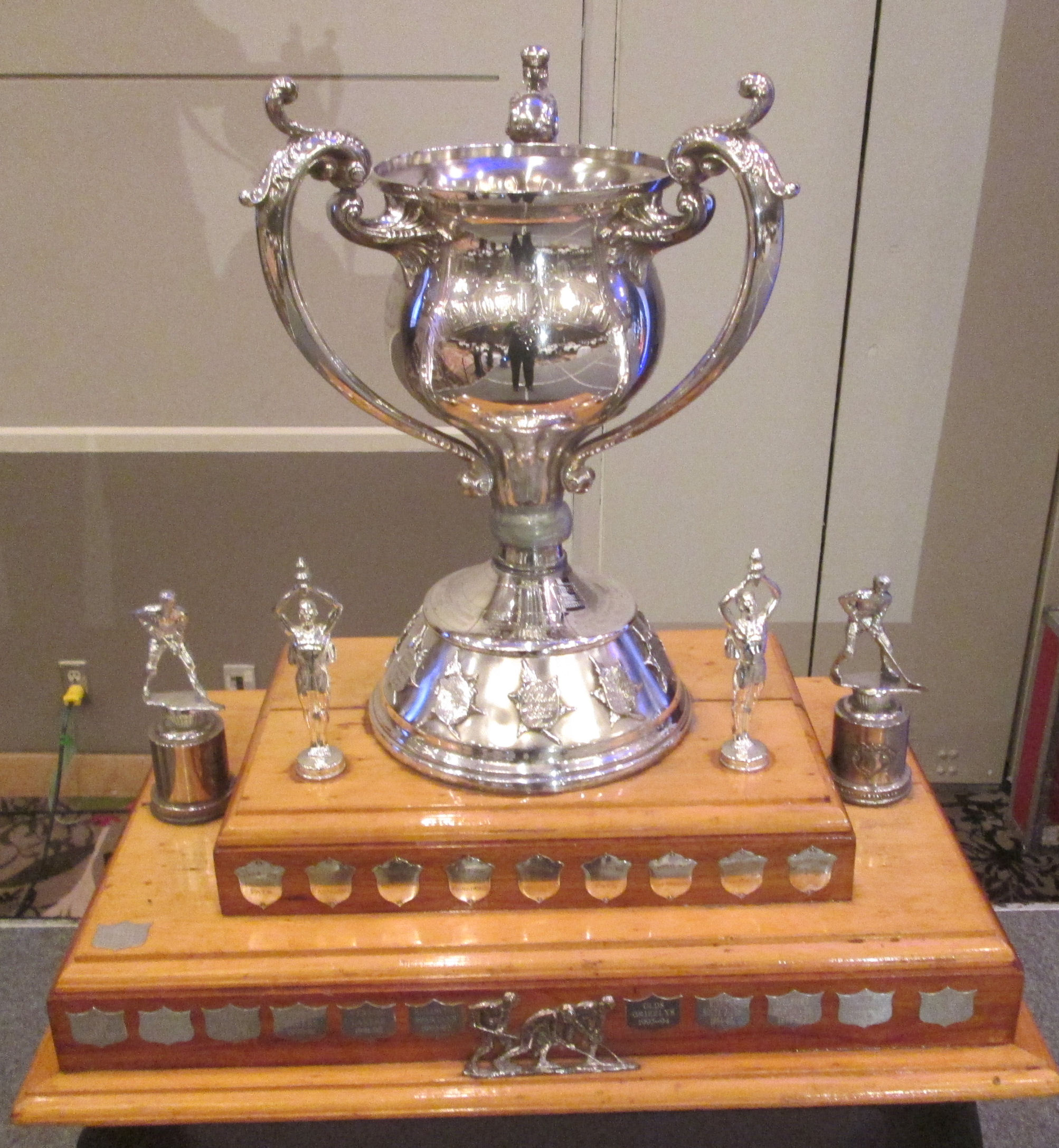
The Abbott Cup

Robinson was named a trustee of the Abbott Cup in 1919, after it was donated by the SAHA to be awarded to the junior hockey champion of Western Canada. He then spread the word to junior teams in Western Canada of a new national championship which became the Memorial Cup. After the CAHA assumed control of scheduling for the Abbott Cup and Memorial Cup games in 1919, Robinson sought for the Thunder Bay Amateur Hockey Association be included in the playoffs for Western Canada when the Memorial Cup was hosted in the east, and vice versa when the Memorial Cup was hosted in the west.

When teams from the Big-4 League were denied entry into the 1920 Allan Cup playoffs, Robinson urged the league to affiliate with the Alberta Amateur Hockey Association to play. He felt that the CAHA needed teams from Saskatchewan, Alberta and British Columbia, to have championships that were representative of the whole country. During the 1922 Allan Cup, Robinson protested that two eastern referees were appointed to the series, and claimed that Western Canada was entitled to appoint one of the referees. A vote by the CAHA upheld his protest, and changed one of the referees. As of the 1924 Allan Cup, the CAHA excluded senior teams representing a commercial organization from playing, after Robinson noted that no such clause existed in the constitution.

==== Professionalism in amateur hockey ====
Prior to the 1919–20 season, Robinson favoured a one-time whitewash of professional athletes in Canada. He sought for each athlete to be given three weeks to apply for reinstatement as an amateur, then to review each case individually, before eliminating the reinstatement process. He previously felt that professional athletes should never be reinstated as an amateur, but changed his opinion due to post-war conditions in Western Canada.

In the 1920–21 season, Robinson voiced opposition to former professionals competing for the Allan Cup, but stated that they could play if permitted by the AAU of C. He subsequently spoke out against the continued reinstatement process, and felt that rules which permitted youth to become professionals would destroy the spirit of sportsmanship. In December 1920, Robinson and the AAU of C sought to eliminate veiled professionalism from amateur sport, particularly hockey in Western Canada. He advocated for six-month residency rules to be strictly enforced, to prevent players from changing teams without a bona fide reason.

In June 1921, CAHA president W. R. Granger met with Robinson and hockey officials in Western Canada to discuss cleaning up veiled professionalism in amateur hockey. The meeting resulted in a recommendation that branches of the CAHA update their by-laws to give executives the necessary powers to enforce regulations and investigate amateur status of a player. The CAHA then established its own registration committee with W. A. Hewitt as the registrar, aimed at investigating all registrations to exclude professionals and reduce the number of players touring Canada from one team to another.

At the 1922 CAHA annual meeting, Robinson was opposed to a suggestion that a professional in one sport could be an amateur in hockey, and reiterated that professionals were not welcomed by the AAU of C.

=== 1932 Winter Olympics ===
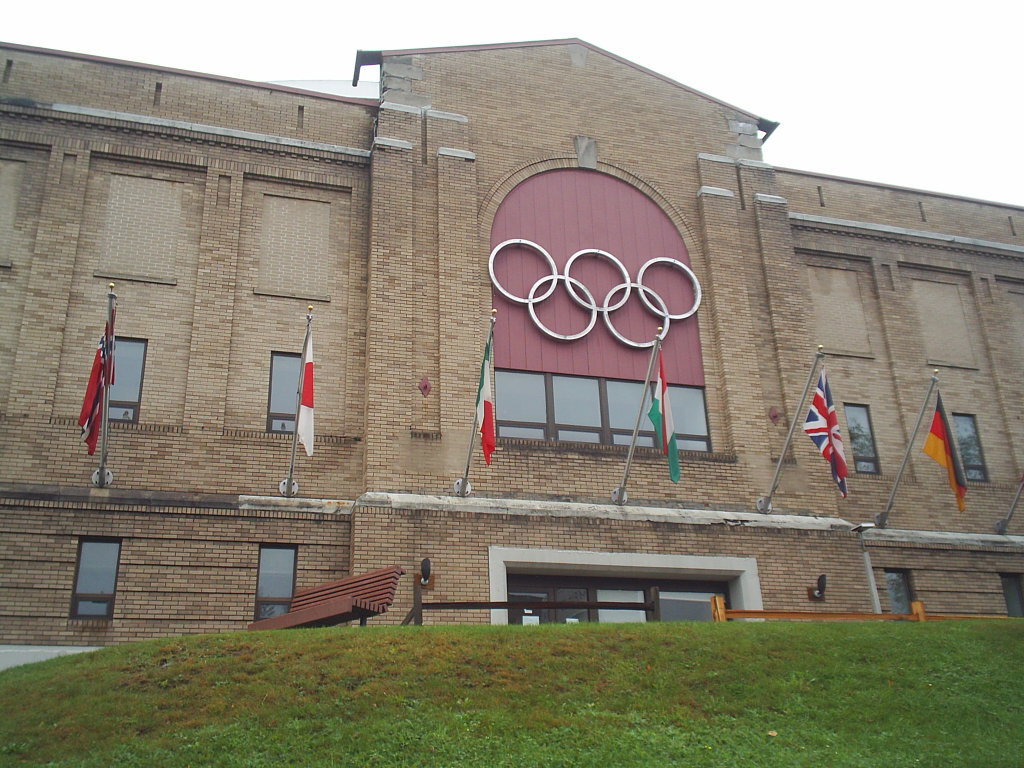
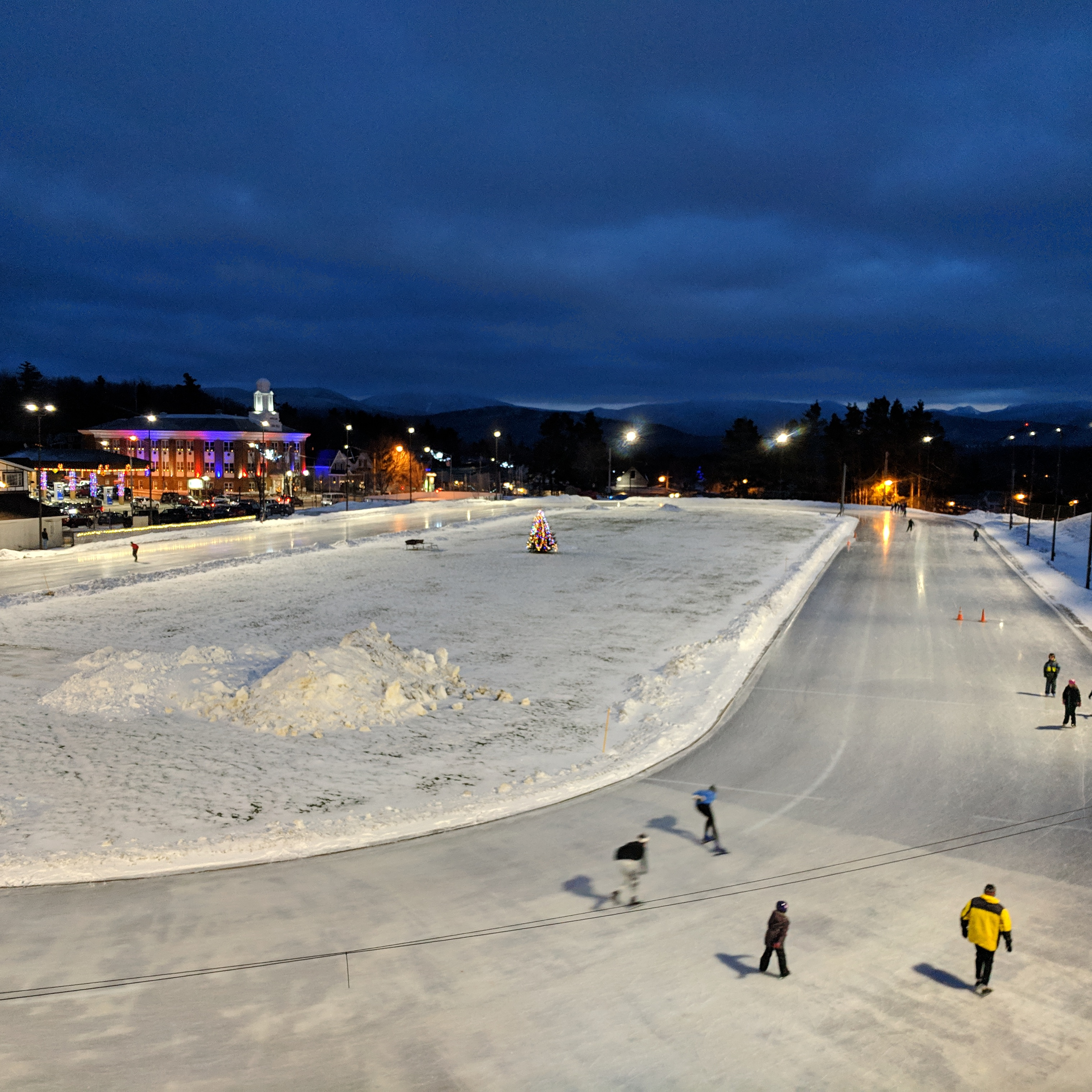
Ice hockey games at the 1932 Winter Olympics were played at Jack Shea Arena (indoor rink), and the James B. Sheffield Olympic Skating Rink (outdoor venue).

Canadian Olympic Committee president P. J. Mulqueen named Robinson to the winter sports committee, in preparation for the national team at the 1932 Winter Olympics. Robinson was later named the honorary assistant manager of the Canadian delegation to the 1932 Winter Olympics, with Melville Marks Robinson as manager of the delegation.

When the 1931 Allan Cup champions Winnipeg Hockey Club were chosen to represent the Canadian national team in the Olympic hockey tournament, Robinson was named associate manager of the team by the Canadian Olympic Committee. He arranged for exhibition games on route to the Olympics, including games in Toronto and Hamilton, Ontario.

Olympics organizers expected a large crowd for the gold medal match between Canada and the United States national team, and scheduled the match to be played on an outdoor rink in the centre of the speed skating oval. Robinson advocated for the game to be played on the larger indoors surface without concerns about the weather, but the game was played outside to accommodate more spectators. Canada won the Olympic gold medal in hockey, then played exhibition games Robinson arranged versus the Atlantic City Seagulls, and the Crescent Athletic Club at Madison Square Garden.

=== Later career ===
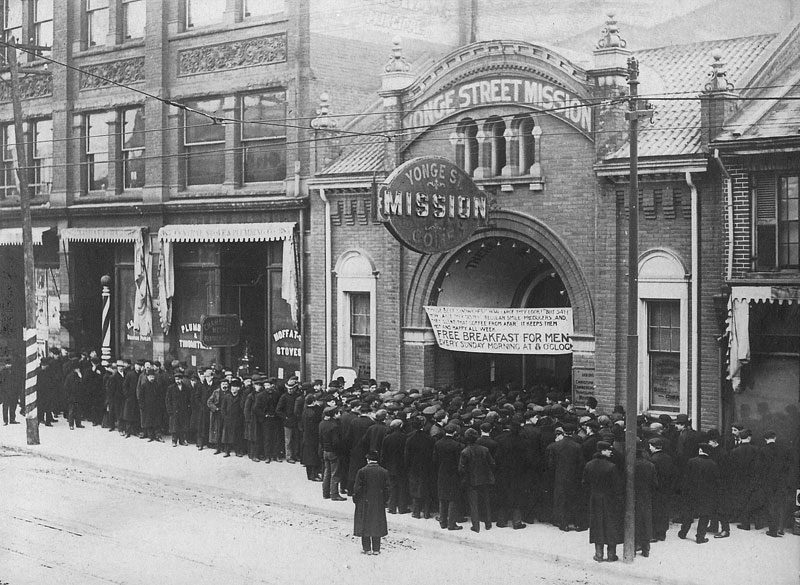
Men in line for food in Toronto during the Great Depression

Robinson served as chairman of the CAHA finance committee from 1933 to 1937. (Note: Robinson was chairman of the CAHA finance committee in 1933. He was re-elected in 1933, and appointed to the position in 1934, and 1936. The CAHA abolished its finance committee in 1937.) He assumed the role at a time when the CAHA was annually increasing grants to its branches to promote minor ice hockey. During the Great Depression in Canada, Robinson reported that the CAHA lost money in both the Allan Cup and Memorial Cup finals in 1936, had $7,000 in losses for the 1935–36 season, and that it had only $15,000 in reserve. He subsequently announced austerity measures which included suspension of grants to branches, and reductions in honorariums to executives and travel expenses for teams. He felt that the CAHA could not carry on another season without the drastic cuts, and the CAHA then scheduled Memorial Cup and Allan Cup playoffs games at the most profitable arenas. One year after the changes were made, Robinson reported playoffs profits exceeding $34,000, and subsequent increases to travel expenses for players and teams.

In November 1936, the CAHA proposed amendments to the AAU of C constitution to alter the definition of an amateur athlete, and allow for mingling of amateur and professionals in sport. Robinson felt that professionals would be a bad influence on amateur athletes, and had no place in amateur sports. When the AAU of C subsequently rejected three of the four CAHA amendments, the relationship between the organizations deteriorated.

Robinson was opposed to the impending divorce of the CAHA from the AAU of C, and suggested that the Allan Cup be withdrawn. Without the AAU of C alliance, he felt that the CAHA would lose its authority over amateur hockey in Canada, the ability to administer its finances, and control of the Allan Cup. Robinson raised his objections despite that H. Montagu Allan had recently declared that the Allan Cup should remain in the possession of the CAHA.

The CAHA formally separated from the AAU of C in January 1937. The Winnipeg Free Press then speculated that Robinson's position as chairman of the finance committee would be abolished, since he continued to be a vocal opponent of the CAHA's new definition of an amateur. In April 1937, the CAHA abolished its finance committee and assigned those duties to the president. The CAHA agreed to pay Robinson's expenses to future CAHA meetings as a life member; he ceased being an Allan Cup trustee as of 1937, and remained a trustee of the Abbott Cup until 1942.

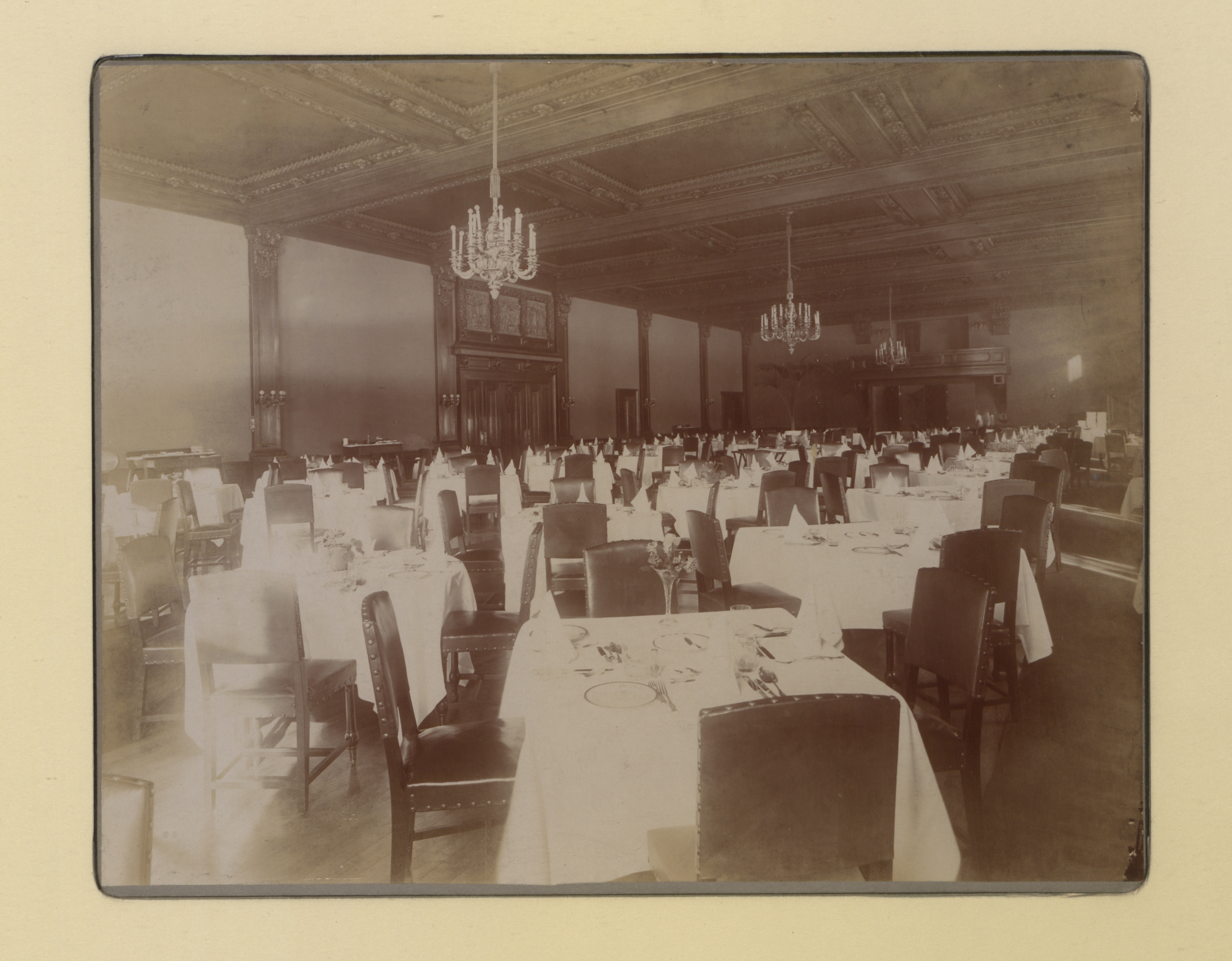
Royal Alexandra Hotel drawing room

The CAHA hosted its silver jubilee in Winnipeg in recognition of the work of Robinson and Winnipeg Amateur Hockey League officials in forming the CAHA. CAHA president W. G. Hardy appointed Robinson to oversee the celebrations hosted at the Royal Alexandra Hotel from April 8–11, 1939. Attending the jubilee were eleven of thirteen former CAHA presidents, six founders including Robinson who attended the first meeting of the CAHA in 1914, and all four CAHA life members including Robinson. Hardy credited Robinson at the jubilee as, "a man whose acknowledged guidance was the foundation of the CAHA, and a man who was the sower of the acorn from which the CAHA oak tree grew".

== Sports and athletics executive ==
During World War I, Robinson served on the executive of the Athletic Patriotic Association, which promoted sporting activities in Winnipeg and provided equipment to military sports teams. He represented the Winnipeg Victorias at the association, and was the chairman of the Winnipeg Amateur Baseball Association junior league c. 1918.

Beginning in 1919, Robinson was delegated to represent the CAHA at national meetings of AAU of C. During the 1920s, he also represented the Manitoba Amateur Athletic Association at the AAU of C meetings. He served as chairman of the national registration committee for the AAU of C from 1920 to 1922, and served as treasurer of the AAU of C from 1919 to 1940. (Note: Robinson was elected treasurer of the Amateur Athletic Union of Canada (AAU of C) in September 1919. He was re-elected treasurer in 1920, 1921, 1922, 1923, 1924, 1925, 1926, 1927, 1928, 1929, 1930, 1931, 1932, 1933, 1934, 1935, 1936, 1937, 1938, and 1939. The AAU of C suspended operations in November 1940, when that year's annual meeting was postponed indefinitely due to World War II.)

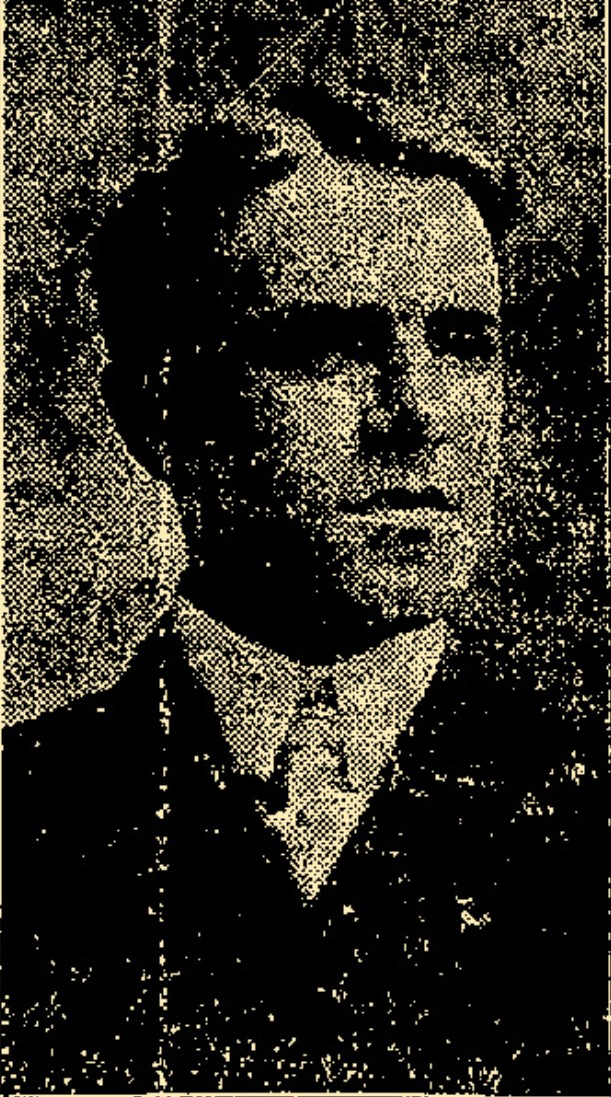
Robinson, c. 1925

Robinson was appointed to a Manitoba Amateur Athletic Association committee to arrange training quarters for track and field athletes in advance of the Canadian trials for the 1924 Summer Olympics. He oversaw finances for the provincial track and field trials championships, and lobbied the Government of Manitoba for $4,000 to develop and send athletes to the national trials. He later sought for annual funding by the government to foster amateur athletics, and was part of a delegation of amateur sports organizations who met with Duncan Lloyd McLeod, the Municipal Commissioner of Manitoba, to lobby for repealing the amusement tax on gate receipts of amateur sporting events.

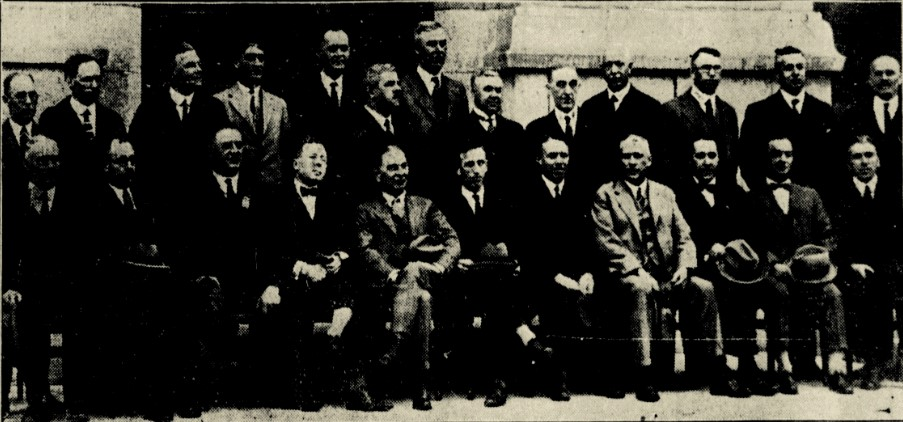
1924 Amateur Athletic Union of Canada annual meeting group photo

In 1923, Robinson was appointed to a committee to discuss an AAU of C affiliation with the Dominion Football Association (DFA), whose executive were also based in Winnipeg. An agreement was reached for the DFA to join in 1928, but delegates to the AAU of C general meeting voted against the resolution which would have allowed professionals and amateurs to mingle in soccer. Robinson continued as a liaison with the DFA until the 1930s.

In preparations for the 1932 Summer Olympics, Robinson was part of a group of delegates from the Canadian Olympic Committee who lobbied Edgar Nelson Rhodes, the Canadian Minister of Finance, seeking $15,000 in funds to cover travel expenses for Canadian athletes. In April 1932, The Manitoba Citizens' Olympic Committee was established to fund athletes in participating at the Canadian trials for the Olympics. Robinson was named treasurer of the committee, which aimed to raise $5,000 for Manitoba's athletes.

The Athletic Patriotic Association reformed in 1939, with Robinson named to its executive. Twenty-five sporting associations in Manitoba co-operated to promote sports and give equipment to military teams during World War II. In February 1940, he was chairman of skating, moccasin hop, and dancing carnival at the Winnipeg Amphitheatre to benefit the association and programs for soldiers.

In November 1946, the AAU of C held its first annual meeting since 1939, with Robinson serving as its honorary secretary until 1948.

== Personal life ==
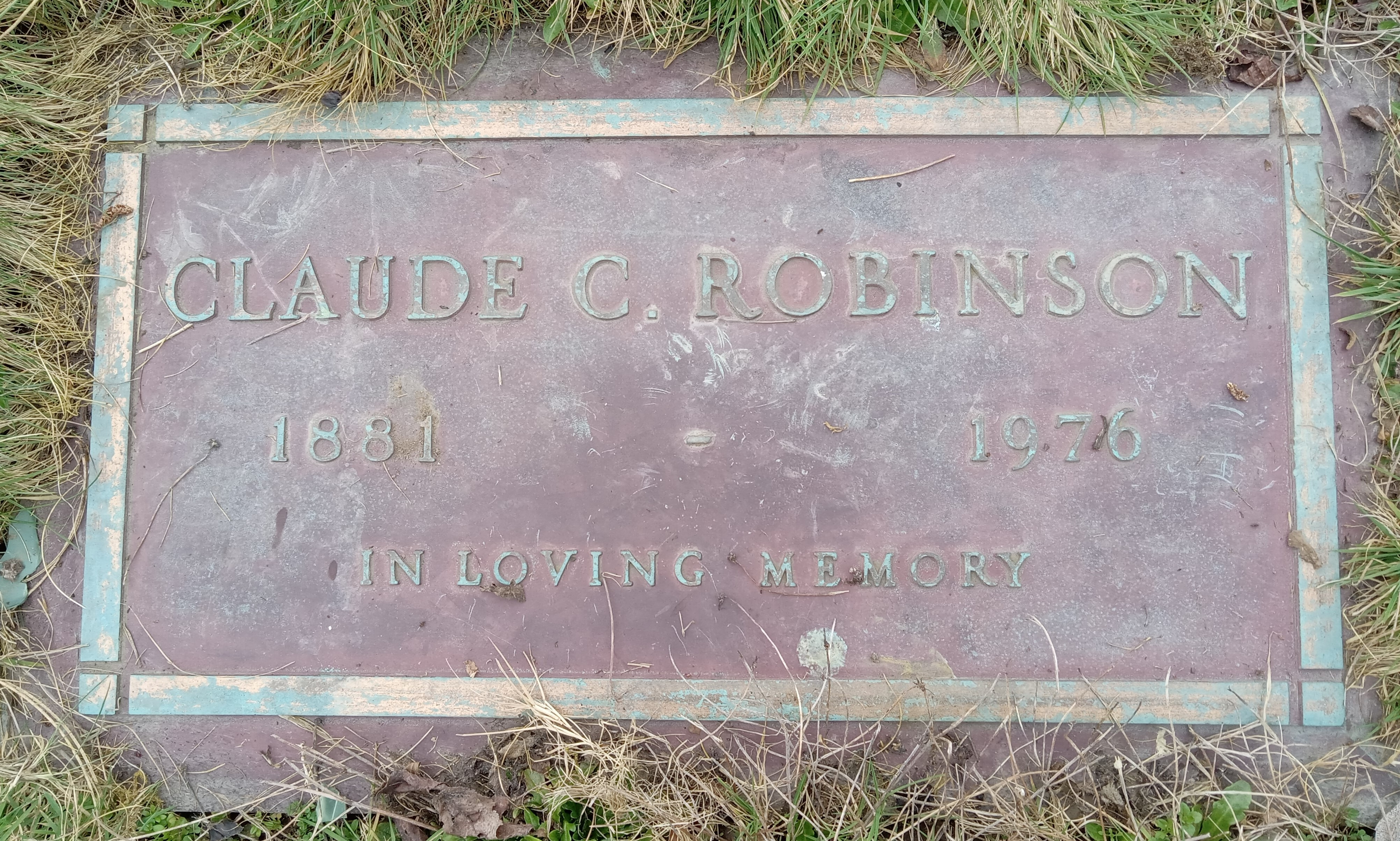
Robinson's grave marker

Robinson married Ellen Frances Doyle, in June 1913 in New York. They had one daughter, and a cottage at Winnipeg Beach. He was the superintendent of the annual regatta at Winnipeg Beach, and sat on the event's organizing committee.

By 1918, Robinson was in business as a coal dealer and distributor based in Winnipeg. He was a director for his father's business, the T. D. Robinson and Sons Coal Company, of which his brother became president upon their father's retirement in 1926. Robinson was the treasurer of Macketta Gold Mines in 1938, then was vice-president of the company by 1940.

During a junior hockey game on December 9, 1941, Robinson was supposed to pick the star-of-the-game for a local radio broadcast, but left early with an injury after he was struck in the head by a hockey puck.

Robinson departed Winnipeg for British Columbia on May 3, 1942, then worked as a civil servant for the Government of Canada. He served two years in Steveston as the Custodian of Enemy Property for Japanese Canadians. In February 1944, he was appointed the assistant regional director for the National Selective Service in the Canadian Pacific.

Robinson was the last living founder of the CAHA, when he died on June 27, 1976, in Vancouver. His funeral and burial were at Forest Lawn Memorial Park in Burnaby.

== Honours and awards ==
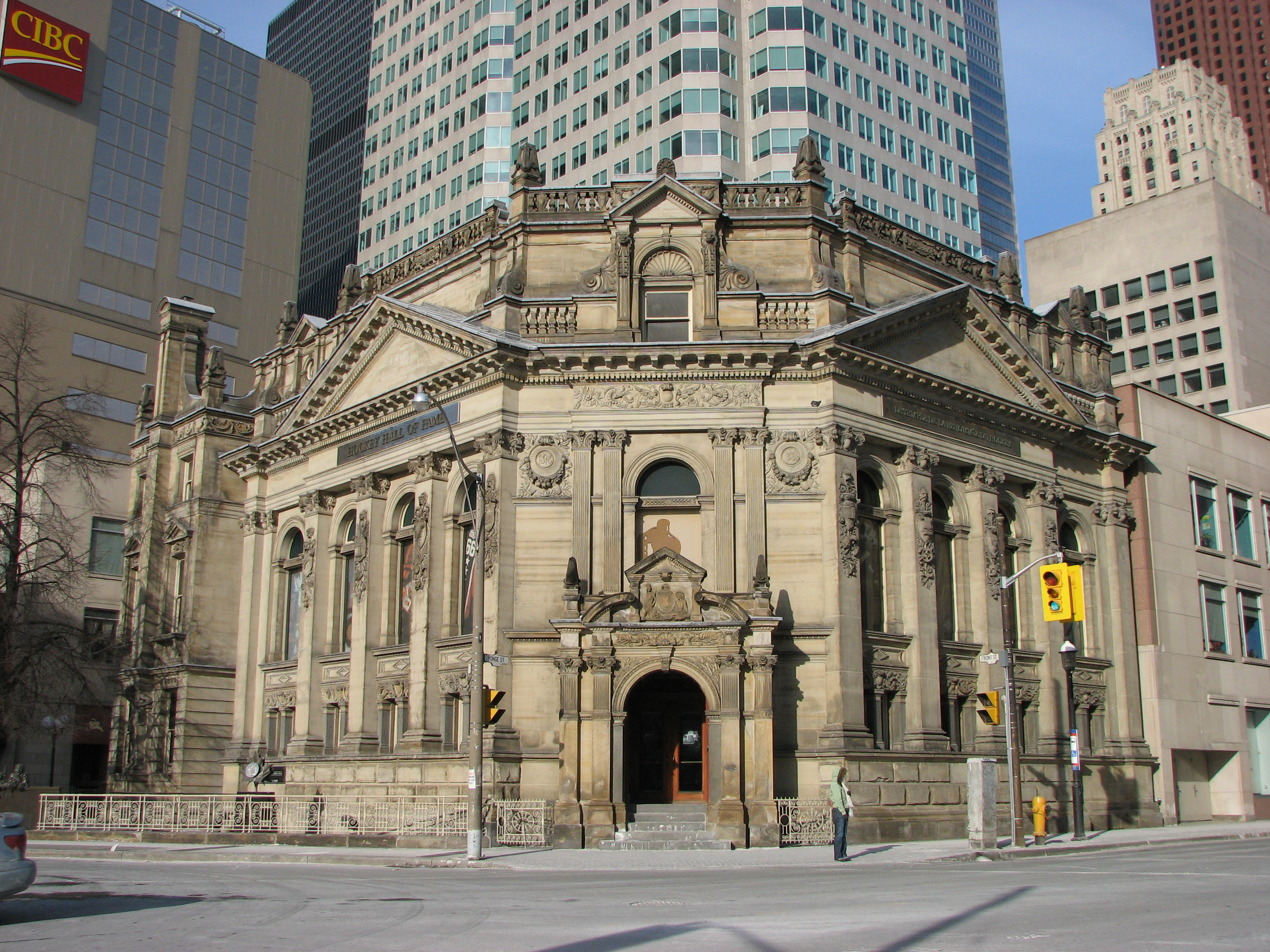
The Hockey Hall of Fame building

At the CAHA general meeting on March 24, 1925, vice-president Frank Sandercock eulogized Robinson's work in hockey, then made a unanimous motion to make him a life member. Robinson became the first life member of the CAHA, in recognition of his contributions to founding the association. Winnipeg Free Press sports editor Maurice Smith, subsequently wrote that Robinson was often referred to as the father of the CAHA. By 1968, Robinson attended his 51st CAHA annual general meeting, missing only one meeting.

Robinson was part of the inaugural group of six men inducted into the builder category of the Hockey Hall of Fame in October 1945. He donated his copy of the minutes from the founding meeting of the CAHA to the Hall of Fame, and received his inductee's scroll at the 1948 CAHA general meeting.

Other recognition for Robinson included induction into the International Hockey Hall of Fame in 1947, and the Ontario Hockey Association Gold Stick award in 1953, in recognition of service to hockey. He was a life member of the AAU of C, and was inducted into builder category of the Canadian Olympic Hall of Fame in 1960. He was a life member and honorary president of the MAHA which he helped establish, and was posthumously inducted into the Manitoba Hockey Hall of Fame in 1985. As a member of the Winnipeg Victorias that won the Allan Cup in 1911 and 1912, he was posthumously inducted into the Manitoba Hockey Hall of Fame, and the Manitoba Sports Hall of Fame and Museum.

== Sources ==
- Canadian Amateur Hockey Association (May 1990). Constitution, By-laws, Regulations, History. Gloucester, Ontario.
- Ferguson, Bob (2005). Who's Who in Canadian Sport, Volume 4. Markham, Ontario: Fitzhenry & Whiteside. ISBN 1-55041-855-6.
