= Fred Higginbotham =

Canadian ice hockey player

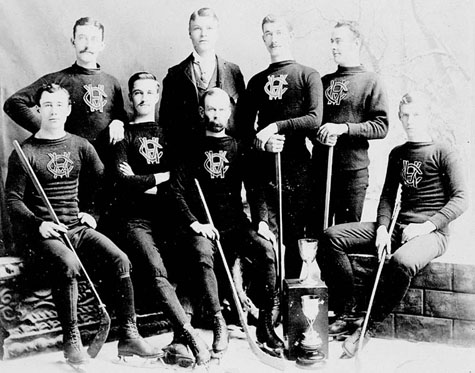
- Higginbotham, standing at far left, with the 1892–93 Winnipeg Victorias.
- Born: c. 1866 Bowmanville, Ontario, Canada
- Died: September 7, 1896 (aged 29–30) Winnipeg, Manitoba, Canada
- Position: Cover-point
- Played for: Winnipeg Victorias
- Playing career: 1890–1896

Frederick Turner Higginbotham (c. 1866 - September 7, 1896) was an ice hockey defenceman for the Winnipeg Victorias. He was part of the team that won the Stanley Cup in 1896, in a challenge game against the Montreal Victorias.

Higginbotham was not a true defenceman. He played in an era of hockey when seven players were present on the ice, including the goaltender. Higginbotham was referred to as a "cover-point", which was the role of the defenceman in today's game. He was primarily responsible for carrying the puck out of the defensive end. He was also a hard hitter.

Higginbotham was born in Bowmanville, Ontario, Canada. Around 1884, he moved to Winnipeg from Bowmanville. He was actively involved in numerous amateur sports and was part of many sporting clubs there. Higginbotham also played professionally with a Vancouver lacrosse team in the late 1880s. Ice hockey was a novelty in the 1890s in Winnipeg, and Higginbotham was one of the first players. He was part of a team that won the Stanley Cup in the winter of 1896. Higginbotham also worked for Hudson's Bay Company since 1889. He was also recognized as an "excellent guitar player".

Higginbotham died in September 1896 as a result of a riding accident at a friend's house. The pony that he was riding ran around a post, and Higginbotham got caught with a clothesline wrapped around his neck. While trying to brace himself for the resulting fall, Higginbotham landed poorly, and sustained very serious spinal cord injuries. He died the next morning. He was buried in Bowmanville.
