= Eastern Canada Amateur Hockey League =

The Eastern Canada Amateur Hockey League was a major amateur senior ice hockey league in Canada that existed from 1923.

== History ==
The Eastern Canada Amateur Hockey League was founded in 1923 from teams in Ontario and Quebec. It was an attempt to set up a major league in eastern Canada, which had several city amateur leagues, but no single amateur league of the top teams. The founding teams were the Montreal Nationals, Montreal Victorias, Ottawa St. Patrick's, Ottawa Munitions, Quebec Sons of Ireland and Trois Rivieres.

In 1924–25 teams from the Montreal City Hockey League merged into the league.

== Seasons ==
Season	Teams	Champion
1923–24	Montreal Nationals, Montreal Victorias, Ottawa St. Patrick's, Ottawa Munitions, Quebec Sons of Ireland and Trois Rivieres	Sons of Ireland def. Victorias in two-game, total-goals series 4–3 (2–3, 2–0)
