= George McNaughton (ice hockey) =

Canadian ice hockey player

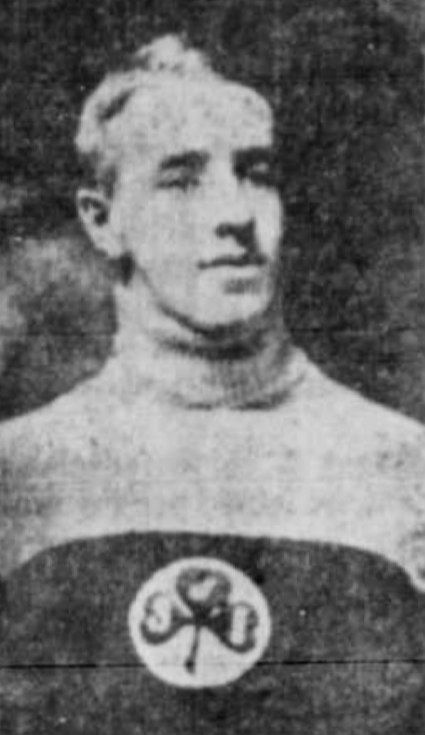
- McNaughton with the Quebec Sons of Ireland
- Born: April 4, 1897 Pabos, Quebec, Canada
- Died: February 6, 1991 (aged 93) Chicoutimi, Quebec, Canada
- Height: 5 ft 9 in (175 cm)
- Weight: 150 lb (68 kg; 10 st 10 lb)
- Position: Right wing
- Shot: Right
- Played for: Quebec Sons of Ireland
- Playing career: 1913–1924

Georges Pabos McNaughton (April 4, 1897 – February 6, 1991) was a Canadian ice hockey player. An amateur player, he spent the predominant bulk of his career in the Quebec City Hockey League with the Quebec Sons of Ireland team. He was born in Gaspé, Quebec.

== Career statistics ==
=== Regular season and playoffs ===
			Regular season					Playoffs
Season	Team	League	GP	G	A	Pts	PIM	GP	G	A	Pts	PIM
1915–16	Quebec Sons of Ireland	QCHL	8	15	0	15	—	2	5	0	5	—
1916–17	Quebec Sons of Ireland	QCHL	10	15	2	17	—	3	2	1	3	3
1917–18	Quebec Sons of Ireland	QCHL	1	1	0	1	—	3	2	1	3	3
1918–19			—	—	—	—	—	—	—	—	—	—
1919–20	Winnipeg Victorias	WHL	1	2	0	2	0	—	—	—	—	—
1919–20	Quebec Sons of Ireland	QCHL	8	12	—	12	—	—	—	—	—	—
1920–21	La Tuque Warriors	QPHL	—	—	—	—	—	—	—	—	—	—
1921–22	Grande'Mere Seniors	QCHL	—	—	—	—	—	—	—	—	—	—
1922–23	Quebec Sons of Ireland	QCHL	15	14	0	14	—	5	7	0	7	—
1923–24	Quebec Sons of Ireland	QCHL	1	0	0	0	—	2	0	0	0	—
1923–24	Quebec Sons of Ireland	Al-Cup	—	—	—	—	—	6	3	0	3	—
NHL totals			1	0	0	0	0	—	—	—	—	—
