= Quebec Sons of Ireland =

- City: Quebec City, Quebec, Canada
- League: Quebec City Hockey League (1915–1918, 1919–20, 1921–22); Quebec Provincial Hockey League (1922–23); ECAHL (1923–1925); Senior Group (1925–1927)
- Operated: 1915–1927
- Colors: Green & White
- General manager: Emmett McDonald (1915–1918)
- Head coach: Emmett McDonald (1915–1918)

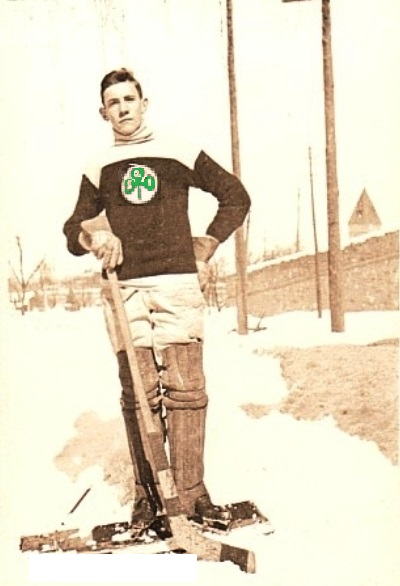
Goaltender Frank Brophy with the Sons of Ireland in 1915–16.

The Quebec Sons of Ireland were a senior amateur ice hockey team from Quebec City that played in various ice hockey leagues in Canada from 1915 to 1927, such as the Quebec City Hockey League, Quebec Provincial Hockey League and the Eastern Canada Amateur Hockey League.

== History ==
The team became a member of the Quebec City Hockey League for the 1915–16 season, and was managed and coached by Emmett McDonald, a younger brother of Quebec Bulldogs forward Jack McDonald. With Emmett McDonald as coach the team would capture the Art Ross Cup in 1916, an amateur challenge trophy for teams not eligible to compete for the Allan Cup. McDonald died of pneumonia on February 28, 1919, while serving with the Canadian Expeditionary Force in Siberia. Another brother, Billy McDonald, played defense on the team.

Quebec Sons of Ireland defended the Art Ross Cup in 1916–17 by defeating the Montreal Stars, Loyola College and Montreal Vickers. The next season Sons of Ireland lost the Art Ross Cup to Montreal Hochelaga on March 6, 1918, losing 4 goals to 0.

== Notable players ==
- George McNaughton
- Art Gagné
- George Carey
- Johnny Gagnon
- Herb Rhéaume
- Mike Neville
- Leo Gaudreault
- Frank Brophy
