= Montreal City Hockey League =

- Countries: Canada
- Region: Quebec
- Founded: 1910
- First season: 1910–11
- Folded: 1924
- Most successful club: Montreal Garnets; Montreal Victorias; Montreal HC; McGill University; Montreal St. Ann's (2 titles each)

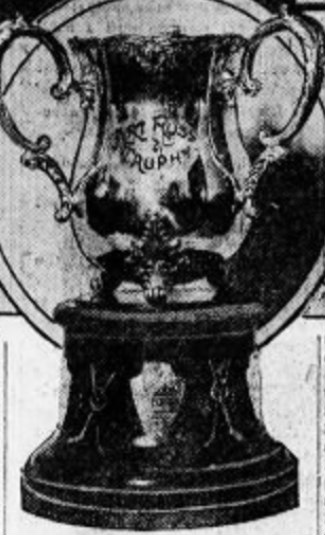
Art Ross Trophy, challenge trophy which champion teams from the MCHL competed for between 1913–1920.

The Montreal City Hockey League (MCHL) was a Canadian amateur senior ice hockey league in Montreal, Quebec which ran for 14 consecutive seasons between 1910 and 1924 when it merged with the Eastern Canada Amateur Hockey League.

A rivaling senior amateur league called the Montreal Hockey League (MHL) ran simultaneously with the MCHL for seven seasons between 1913 and 1920.

The amateur teams in Montreal did not follow strict rules of player residency and were thus not eligible to compete for the Allan Cup as Canadian amateur champions against teams from other provinces, so instead the Art Ross Trophy was introduced as a challenge trophy between the champion teams from the various amateur leagues in the city. The trophy was competed for from 1913–1920.

== Champions ==
- 1910–11: Montreal Garnets
- 1911–12: Montreal Garnets
- 1912–13: Montreal Champêtre
- 1913–14: Montreal Victorias
- 1914–15: Montreal HC
- 1915–16: Montreal HC
- 1916–17: Loyola College
- 1917–18: McGill University
- 1918–19: Montreal Canada Vickers
- 1919–20: Montreal Victorias
- 1920–21: McGill University
- 1921–22: Montreal St. Ann's
- 1922–23: Montreal Nationals
- 1923–24: Montreal St. Ann's

Source: Society for International Hockey Research (sihrhockey.org)
