= 1911 Allan Cup =

Canadian senior ice hockey championship

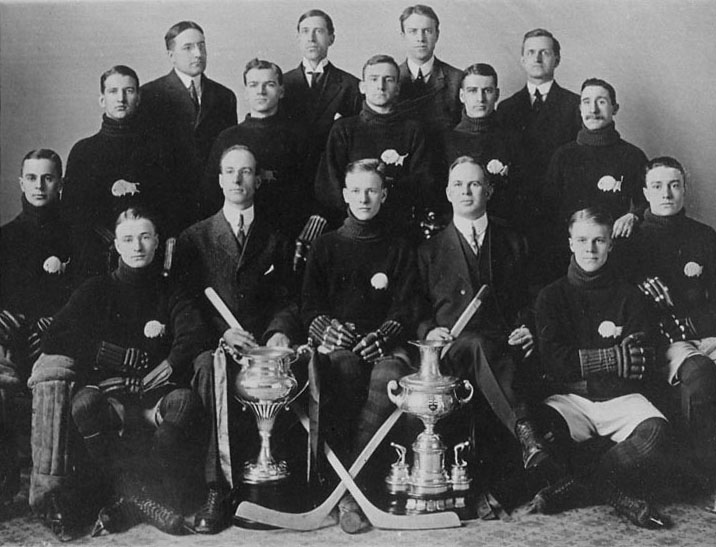
The Winnipeg Victorias with the Allan Cup in 1911

The 1911 Allan Cup was the Canadian senior ice hockey championship for the 1910–11 season. The defending champion Toronto St. Michael's Majors were stripped of the title by default to the Winnipeg Victorias. The Victorias then defeated the Kenora Thistles in a challenge to hold the title. It was the third season of play for the Allan Cup.

== First challenge ==
Allan Cup trustees accepted the challenge by Claude C. Robinson and the Winnipeg Victorias, to play the defending 1910 Allan Cup champions, the Toronto St. Michael's Majors. It was the first challenge to be accepted from Western Canada.

Trustees ordered the Majors to play for the Allan Cup from February 20 to 25, but the trophy was awarded to the Victorias by default, when the Majors refused to play by the deadline given.

The Majors reportedly refused according to instructions given by the Ontario Hockey Association (OHA) executive, which wanted the games to be played in March, rather than February. The Winnipeg Tribune wrote that the OHA felt that it set the standard for senior hockey, and they would not send its champion westward since the Allan Cup rightfully belonged in Ontario. The OHA refused to surrender the trophy and The Winnipeg Tribune speculated that the issue may end up in court before it was shipped to Winnipeg.

== Second challenge ==
Trustees then permitted Claude C. Robinson to make arrangements for a challenge received from the Kenora Thistles. The Victorias won the first game by a 12–5 score, and Kenora won the second game by a 5–4 score. The Victorias retained the Allan Cup by a combined score of 16–10 in The Victorias defeated Kenora by a combined score of 16–10 in the two-game series played in Winnipeg. The series between the Victorias and Kenora earned gate receipts of approximately CA$2,000, most of which went to charity after expenses were deducted. It was the largest profit to date for the Allan Cup, approx CA$1,500. Victorias received none of the profits. Allan Cup trustee William Northey requested a list of local charities to receive the proceeds.

== Third challenge ==
Trustees denied a challenge from the Calgary Athletic Club since some of its players were ineligible, then later approved a series with Calgary, but arrangements could not be completed in time to play.
