= Dan Bain =

Canadian ice hockey player (1874–1962)

- Hockey Hall of Fame, 1945
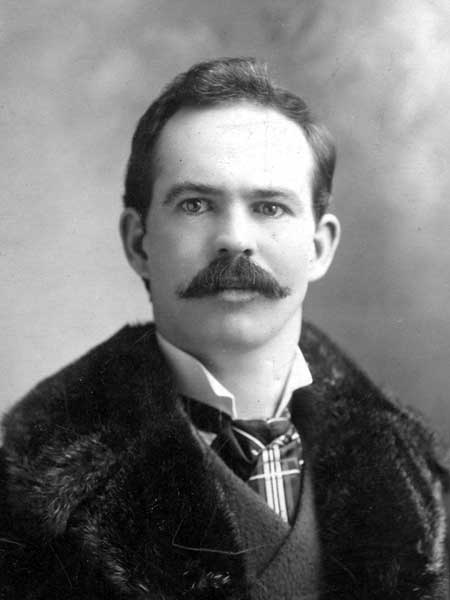
- Bain in 1900
- Born: February 14, 1874 Belleville, Ontario, Canada
- Died: August 15, 1962 (aged 88) Winnipeg, Manitoba, Canada
- Height: 6 ft 0 in (183 cm)
- Weight: 185 lb (84 kg; 13 st 3 lb)
- Position: Centre
- Played for: Winnipeg Victorias
- Playing career: 1895–1902

Donald Henderson Bain (February 14, 1874 – August 15, 1962) was a Canadian amateur athlete and merchant. In ice hockey he was a member of the Winnipeg Victorias from 1894 until 1902, and helped the team win the Stanley Cup twice. He also won medals and championships in other sports and was the Canadian trapshooting champion in 1903. Bain was inducted into several halls of fame, including the Hockey Hall of Fame in 1945 and the International Hockey Hall of Fame in 1949. He was also voted Canada's top athlete of the last half of the 19th century.

In his professional life, Bain was a prominent Winnipeg businessman and community leader. He became wealthy by operating Donald H. Bain Limited, a grocery brokerage firm. Bain was an active member of numerous community associations and president of the Winnipeg Winter Club. The Mallard Lodge, a building on the shores of Lake Manitoba built by Bain as a personal retreat, serves as a research facility for the University of Manitoba.

== Early life ==
Donald Henderson Bain, also known as Dan or DH, was born in Belleville, Ontario, on February 14, 1874, to Scottish immigrants. His father, James Henderson Bain, was a horse buyer for the British government; upon arriving in Canada, he settled in Montreal before moving west. His mother, Helen Miller, was a seamstress. Bain was the sixth of seven children, with four sisters and two brothers. When Bain was a young child, the family moved to Winnipeg, Manitoba. Bain attended school in Winnipeg and earned a bachelor's degree from Manitoba College.

== Sporting career ==
Bain's first championship came in 1887 when he won the Manitoba roller skating title by winning a three-mile race. At age 17, he won the Manitoba provincial gymnastics competition; at age 20, he won the first of three consecutive Manitoba cycling championships. Bain was also a top lacrosse player in his home province.

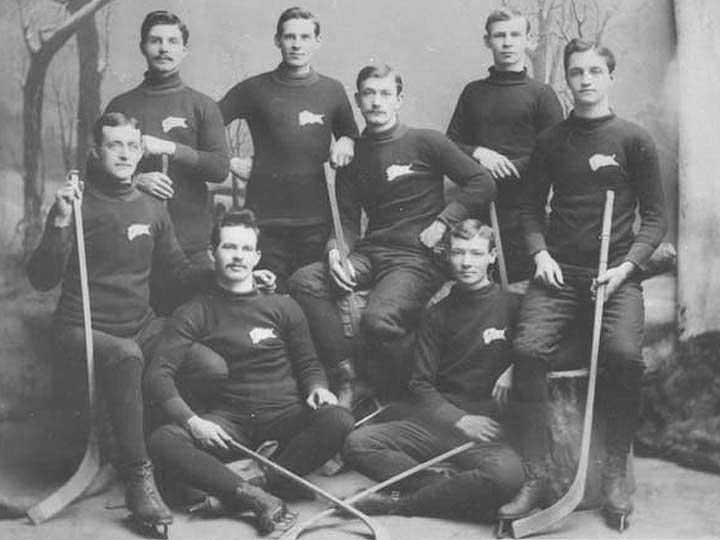
The Winnipeg Victorias in 1896. Bain is in the front row, second from the left.

In 1895, Bain answered a classified ad placed in a newspaper by the Winnipeg Victorias, an ice hockey team looking for new players. Though he played with a broken stick held together by wire, Bain was selected for the team five minutes into the tryout. He became a star centre and leader of the Victorias. On February 14, 1896, the team played against the Montreal Victorias for the Stanley Cup, the trophy for Canada's hockey championship; Bain scored a goal in a 2–0 win for Winnipeg. In a rematch for the Cup in December 1896, Bain scored two goals but Montreal recaptured the Cup with a 6–5 victory. Winnipeg was involved in other Stanley Cup challenges with Bain serving as the team's captain and manager. They lost again to their Montreal counterparts in 1898.

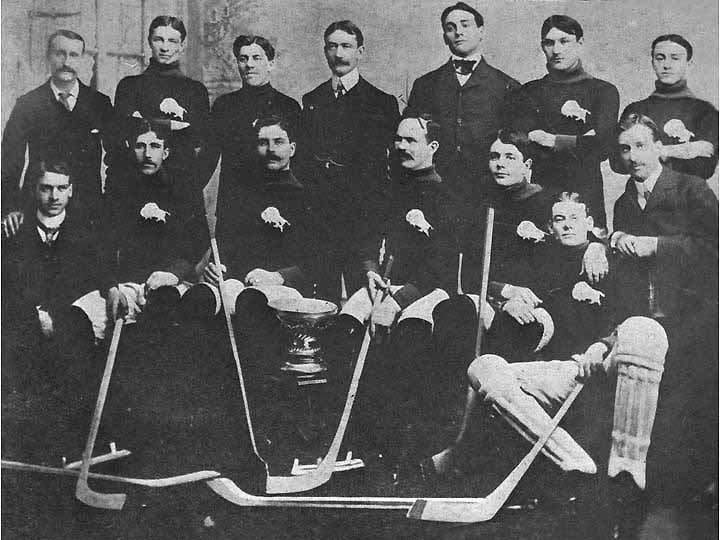
The Winnipeg Victorias posing for a photo with the Stanley Cup in 1901. Bain is in the front row, fourth from the left.

During a 1900 challenge series against the Montreal Shamrocks, Bain scored four goals in three games, but Winnipeg again lost the title. The Victorias challenged the Shamrocks in 1901 in a best-of-three series. Bain played in the series with a broken nose that required him to wear a wooden face mask, earning him the nickname "the masked man". Winnipeg won the series in two games after Bain scored the clinching goal in overtime, the first time in Stanley Cup history that the winning goal was scored in extra time. The team lost a challenge for the Cup against the Montreal Hockey Club in March 1902, which marked the end of Bain's hockey-playing career. In 1911 and 1912 the Victorias, with Bain as honorary president, won the Allan Cup, which replaced the Stanley Cup as the top amateur hockey trophy in Canada in 1909.

Bain also earned medals in lacrosse and snowshoeing, and was the Canadian trapshooting champion in 1903. He won over a dozen titles in figure skating, the last of which came at the age of 56; he continued to skate until the age of 70.

== Personal life ==
Bain's first job was as a bookkeeper's apprentice to a grocery broker, where he rose to junior partner when the business was sold to one of his neighbours. By 1905, the company added his name, creating Nicholson and Bain. The firm prospered, with offices across Western Canada. This partnership ended in 1917 due to differences in lifestyles between the two men. Bain renamed the firm Donald H. Bain Limited and served as president. Through his firm, Bain amassed a large fortune and purchased several properties in and around Winnipeg.

Bain helped create the Winnipeg Winter Club on land that is now the home of the HMCS Chippawa naval reserve division. After the Second World War, he organized the current Winter Club. Bain belonged to many community groups, including the Freemasons, and was the life governor of the Winnipeg General Hospital. He was one of Western Canada's first automobile enthusiasts and owned several British vehicles. He served for a time as president of the Winnipeg Automobile Club.

For the sport of trapshooting, Bain bought an ownership share in the Portage Country Club, on the Delta Marsh near the south shore of Lake Manitoba; he later donated the land to Ducks Unlimited. Bain built the Mallard Lodge as a personal retreat on land adjacent to the club. He strictly enforced his privacy, building a road to his lodge that he allowed no one else to use; members of the Portage Country Club were required to take a different route. Bain intended to donate his lodge to the government of Manitoba for preservation, though he died before he could make these arrangements. The lodge passed into the control of the government regardless, and in 1966 was donated to the University of Manitoba as a research facility. Bain was also a member of the Manitoba Game and Fish Association and the Winnipeg Humane Society.

Bain never married and had no children. A quiet and reserved individual after his playing career, Bain earned a reputation as a workaholic and was described by a friend as "salty in speech and strongly opinionated." Bain upheld a strong moral code, including abstaining from alcohol, and led a frugal lifestyle. He was fond of his pets, in particular his Curly Coated Retriever dogs that he was said to value above human company. On August 15, 1962, Bain died in Winnipeg, aged 88. He left an estate in excess of C$1 million ($10.3 million in 2025 dollars), the majority of which he donated to charity such as the Winnipeg General Hospital and the humane society, as well as to former employees. He was buried in the cemetery of St. John's Cathedral in Winnipeg.

== Career statistics ==
=== Regular season and playoffs ===
Statistics obtained from the Hockey Hall of Fame.

			Regular season					Playoffs
Season	Team	League	GP	G	A	Pts	PIM	GP	G	A	Pts	PIM
1894–95	Winnipeg Victorias	MHL	3	10	0	10	—	—	—	—	—	—
1895–96	Winnipeg Victorias	MHL	5	10	3	13	—	2	3	0	3	—
1896–97	Winnipeg Victorias	MHL	5	7	1	8	—	—	—	—	—	—
1897–98	Winnipeg Victorias	MHL	5	13	1	14	—	—	—	—	—	—
1898–99	Winnipeg Victorias	MHL	3	11	1	12	—	1	0	0	0	0
1899–1900	Winnipeg Victorias	MHL	2	9	1	10	0	3	4	0	4	—
1900–01	Winnipeg Victorias	MHL	3	3	0	3	1	2	3	0	3	—
1901–02	Winnipeg Victorias	MHL	1	3	0	3	0	3	0	0	0	0
Totals			27	66	7	73	—	11	10	0	10	—

== Honours and legacy ==
In 1945, Bain was one of 12 players selected for the inaugural class of the Hockey Hall of Fame. In 1949, he was elected a member of the International Hockey Hall of Fame. This was followed in 1971 by his induction into Canada's Sports Hall of Fame and the Manitoba Hockey Hall of Fame. He was inducted into the Manitoba Sports Hall of Fame and Museum in 1981 as an individual, then again in 2004 with the 1911 and 1912 Winnipeg Victorias teams. Bain was also voted Canada's top sportsman of the last half of the 19th century.

The building constructed for his grocery business was named as the Nicholson Building / Donald H. Bain Building. It was designated a municipal heritage site and a plaque with his biography is mounted on the building. Waghorn House / Bain House, the home that Bain lived in from 1905 to his death, was also named for him.
