= Rod Flett =

Canadian ice hockey player (1873–1927)

Roderick Flett
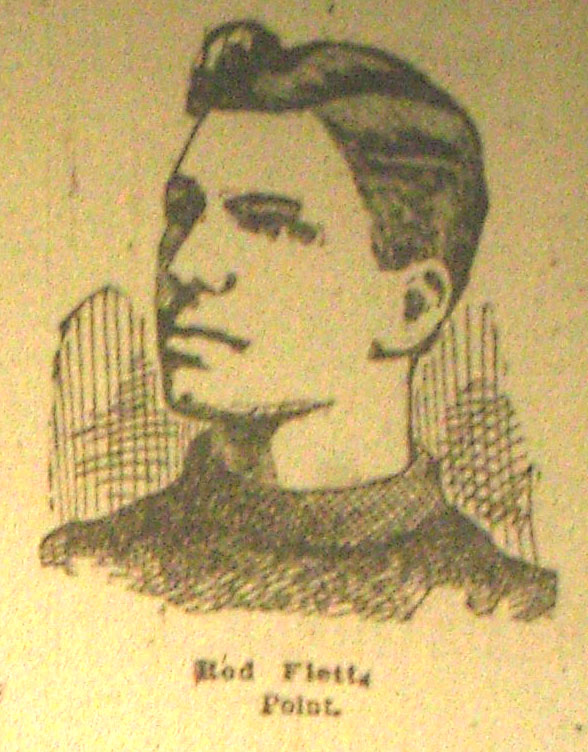
- Rod Flett in 1901.
- Born: January 26, 1873 Kildonan, Manitoba, Canada
- Died: June 30, 1927 (aged 54) Winnipeg, Manitoba, Canada
- Position: Point
- Played for: Winnipeg Victorias
- Playing career: 1893–1903

Roderick McLeod Flett (January 26, 1873 – June 30, 1927) was a Canadian Métis ice hockey player. He was a member of the three-time Stanley Cup Champion Winnipeg Victorias. He played the point position, now known as left defence. His younger brother Magnus Flett was also a hockey player on the Winnipeg Victorias team.

Rod Flett was born in Kildonan, Manitoba in 1873 and died while golfing at the St. Charles Country Club in Winnipeg in 1927.

== Awards and achievements ==
- Stanley Cup Championships (1896, & 1901, 1902)
- “Honoured Member” of the Manitoba Hockey Hall of Fame
