= Jack Armytage =

Canadian ice hockey player (1872–1943)

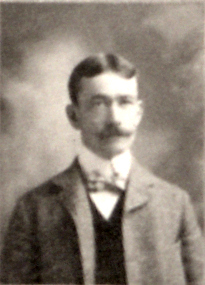
- Jack Armytage in 1900.
- Born: February 11, 1872 Fergus, Ontario
- Died: August 7, 1943 (aged 71) Winnipeg, Manitoba
- Position: Rover
- Played for: Winnipeg Victorias
- Playing career: 1890–1897

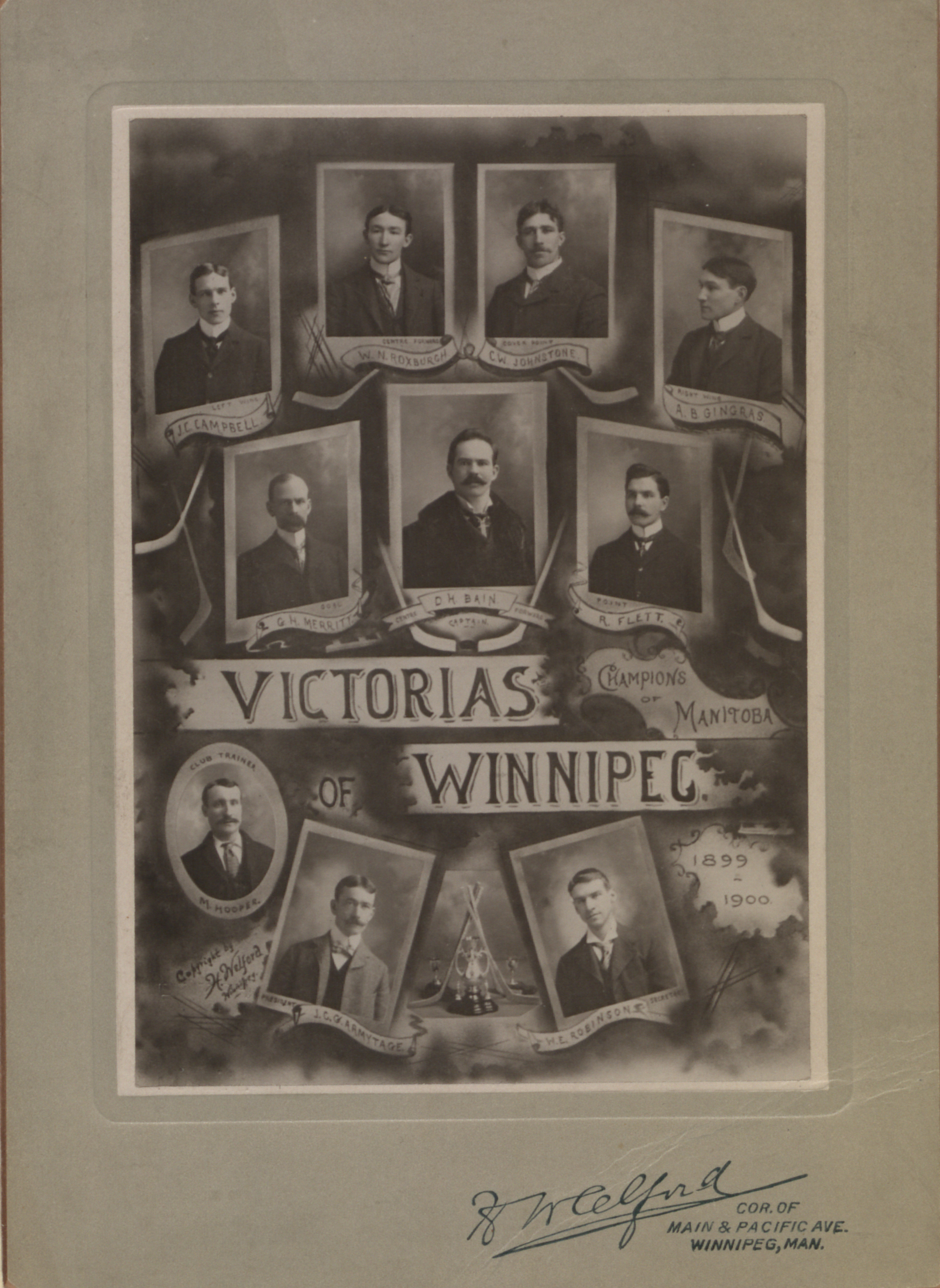
Jack Armytage, in the middle in the bottom row, with the 1899–1900 Winnipeg Victorias.

John Crichton Green-Armytage (February 11, 1872 – August 7, 1943) was a Canadian ice hockey rover. Born in Fergus, Ontario, Canada, he is best remembered as the man who first organized a hockey club in the city of Winnipeg, Manitoba, Canada.

== Awards and achievements ==
- Stanley Cup Championships – 1896 with the Winnipeg Victorias
- "Honoured Member" of the Manitoba Hockey Hall of Fame
