= Winnipeg Victorias =

Amateur ice hockey team in Winnipeg, Manitoba, Canada

- City: Winnipeg, Manitoba, Canada
- League: Manitoba Hockey Association
- Colours: Red, Yellow

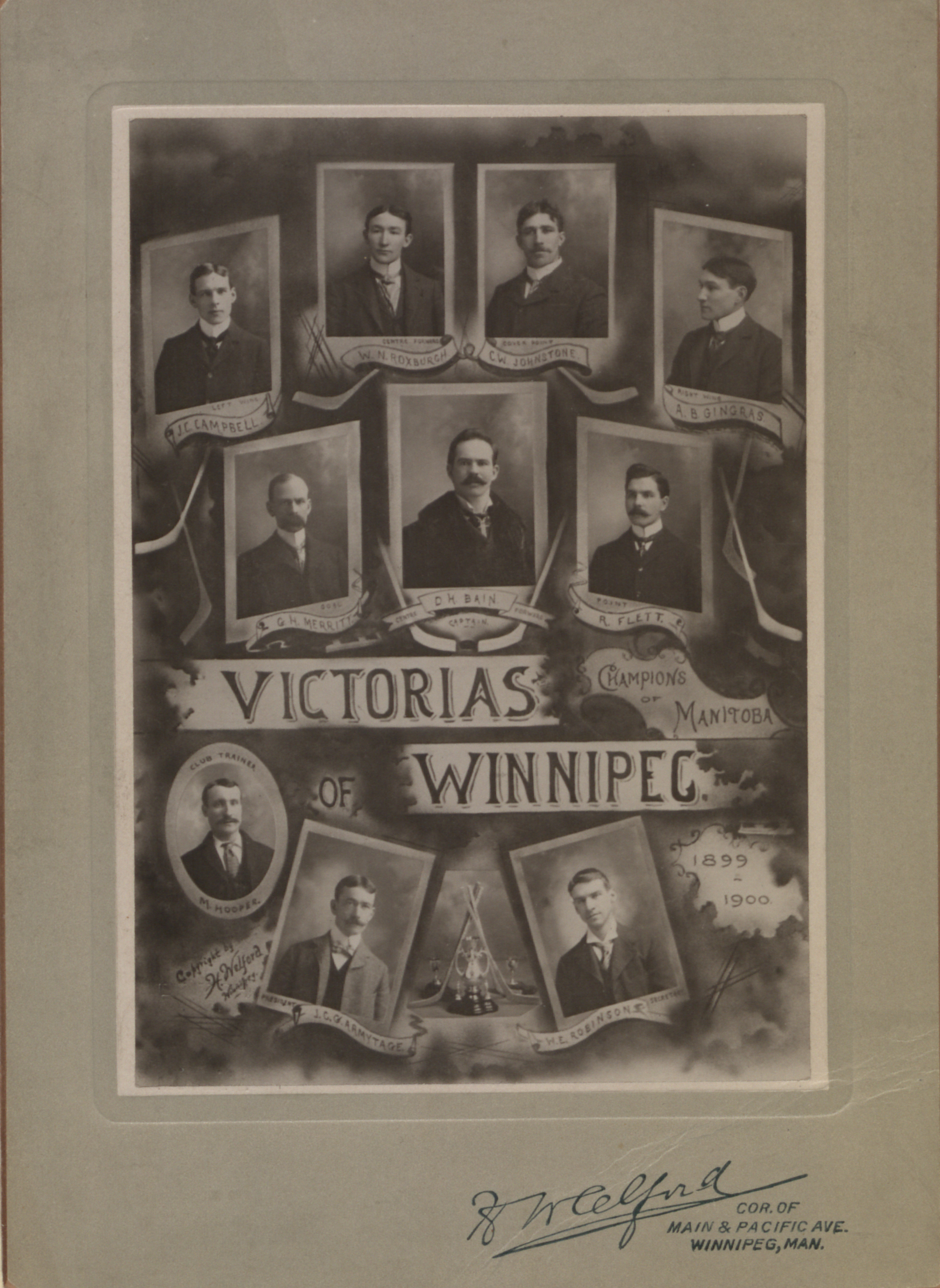
Team portrait in 1900

The Winnipeg Victorias were an amateur senior-level men's amateur ice hockey team in Winnipeg, Manitoba, organized in 1889. They played in the Manitoba Hockey Association (MHA) in the late 19th and early 20th centuries. The Victorias won the Stanley Cup in February 1896, 1901 and January 1902 while losing the Cup in December 1896, February 1899, February 1900, March 1902, and February 1903. After the Stanley Cup became the professional championship, the Victorias continued in senior-level amateur play, winning the Allan Cup in 1911 and 1912.

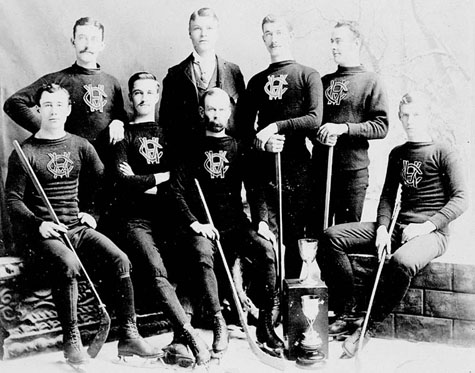
Victorias hockey team, champions of Manitoba and Northwest Territories, 1892–1893

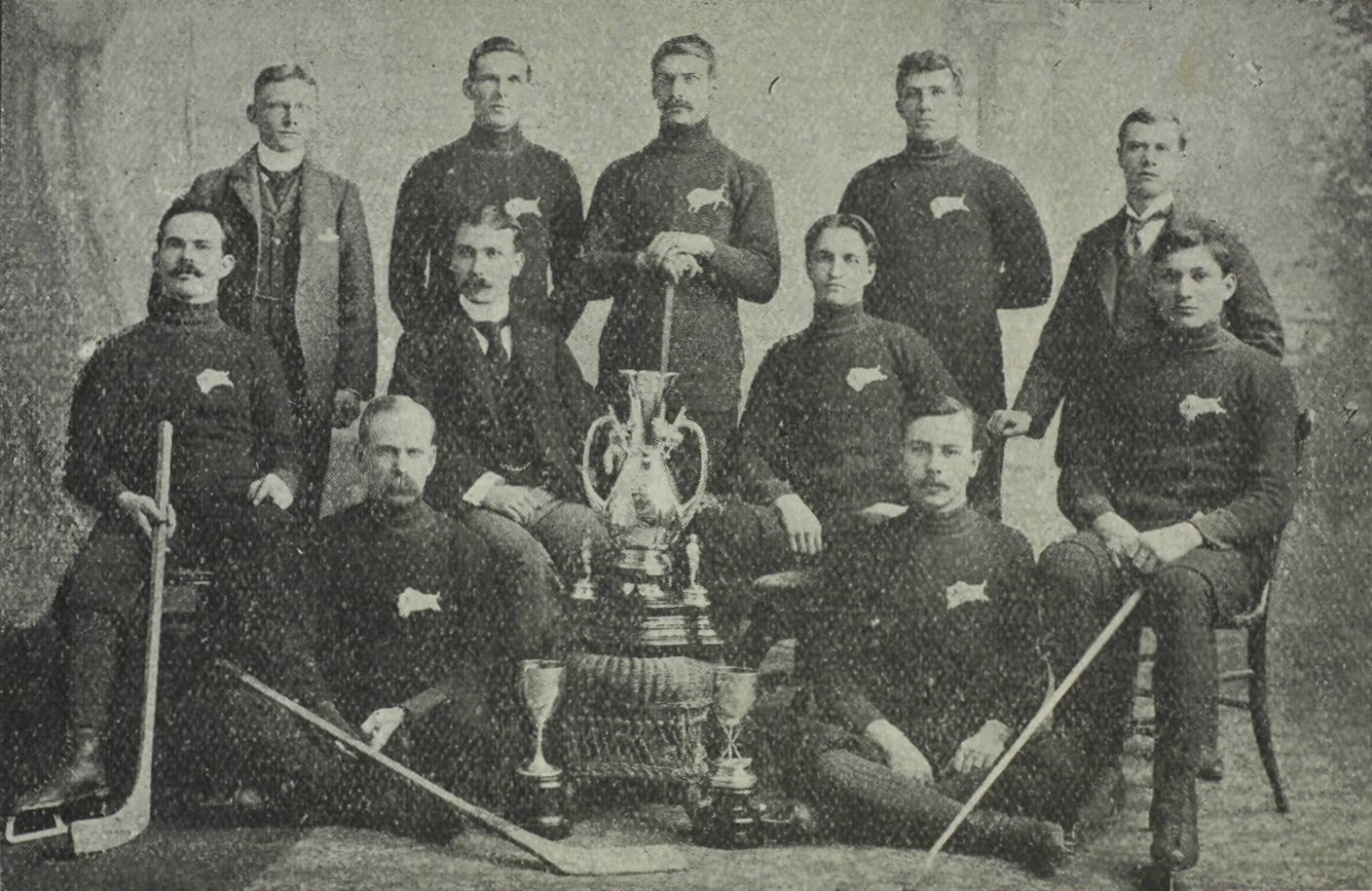
Team picture, 1899

== History ==
=== 1899 to 1902 ===
The Victoria Hockey Club, and the first rink they played in, took their name from the then-reigning monarch of Canada, Queen Victoria. From 1889 until 1892, the Victorias played exhibitions and played against other Winnipeg teams. The Victorias played in the first match in Western Canada between organized hockey clubs on December 20, 1890, against the Winnipeg Hockey Club at the Street Railway Rink in Winnipeg. The players were:

Victorias
- W. H. Thompson (goal)
- Thomas A. Howard (back)
- J. McCulloch, Jack Armytage (wings)
- G. H. Merritt, Fred Higginbotham, Alex Norquay (forwards)
Winnipegs
- A. B. Clark (goal)
- F. L. Patton (back)
- Claude Denison, McDonald (wings)
- Frank Beckett, Harry Beckett, John R. Waghorn (forwards)

Source: "In the Early Days". The Globe. December 28, 1910. p. 11.

The Victorias helped to found the Manitoba Hockey Association in 1893. In February 1893, players from the Victorias joined players from the Winnipeg Dragoons and the Winnipeg Hockey Club on a tour of Eastern Canada to demonstrate the quality of ice hockey in Western Canada. Tour schedule

- February 9 vs. Toronto Victorias at Toronto, Ontario (W 8–2)
- February 10 vs. Toronto Osgoode Hall at Toronto (W 11–5)
- February 11 vs. Queen's College at Kingston, Ontario (W 4–3)
- February 13 vs. Ottawa Hockey Club at Ottawa, Ontario (L 1–4)
- February 15 vs. Montreal Hockey Club at Montreal, Quebec (L 4–7)
- February 17 vs. Peterborough at Peterborough, Ontario (W 9–3)
- February 20 vs. Toronto Granites at Toronto (W 11–3)
- February 21 vs. London at London, Ontario (W 7–1)
- February 22 vs. Niagara Falls at Niagara Falls, Ontario (W 10–4)
- February 23 vs. Hamilton Thistles at Hamilton, Ontario (cancelled)
- February 24 vs. Combined Ontario/Osgoode Hall at Toronto (L 3–4)

Source: Montreal Gazette

The Victorias first won the Stanley Cup in 1896, defeated the Montreal Victorias in a single-game challenge 2–0 on February 14, 1896, in Montreal. In the rematch, Winnipeg lost to Montreal in a single-game challenge 5–6 on December 30, 1896, in Winnipeg.

In 1898, the team moved to the new Winnipeg Auditorium, built to hold 2000 spectators for hockey. In February 1899, the Victorias would lose a two-game total goals series 5–3 against Montreal. In their next chance, the Victorias defeated Montreal Shamrocks in a two-game, total goals series 4–3, 2–1 (6–4) on January 29 and 31, 1901 in Montreal. The Victorias held the trophy, winning the Manitoba championship, and successfully defended the Stanley Cup against the Toronto Wellingtons in a two-game, total goals series 5–3, 5–3 (10–6) on January 21 and 23, 1902 in Winnipeg at the Auditorium. The Victorias run as champion ended in a loss to Montreal Hockey Club in a best two-of-three 1–0, 0–5 and 1–2 on March 13, 15 and 17, 1902 in Winnipeg.

=== 1904 to 1912 ===
The Victorias subsequently operated teams at the senior ice hockey and intermediate levels. The Victorias won the intermediate league during the 1904–05 season, with Claude C. Robinson as the captain. After 1906, the Victorias no longer challenged for the Stanley Cup, and remained an amateur team, playing in the Manitoba Association. Robinson coached the Victorias to a Manitoba Hockey League senior championship for the 1908–09 season, and felt that his team could have competed for the newly established Allan Cup, although challenges from senior teams were accepted only from Eastern Canada at the time.

Allan Cup trustees accepted the challenge from Robinson and the Victorias, to play the Toronto St. Michael's Majors for the trophy, in Winnipeg from February 20–25, 1911. When the Majors refused to play by the deadline given, trustees awarded the 1911 Allan Cup to the Victorias by default. The Winnipeg Tribune wrote that the Majors had refused since the Ontario Hockey Association (OHA) executive wanted the games to be played in March, and that the OHA initially refused to surrender the trophy despite instructions from the trustees.

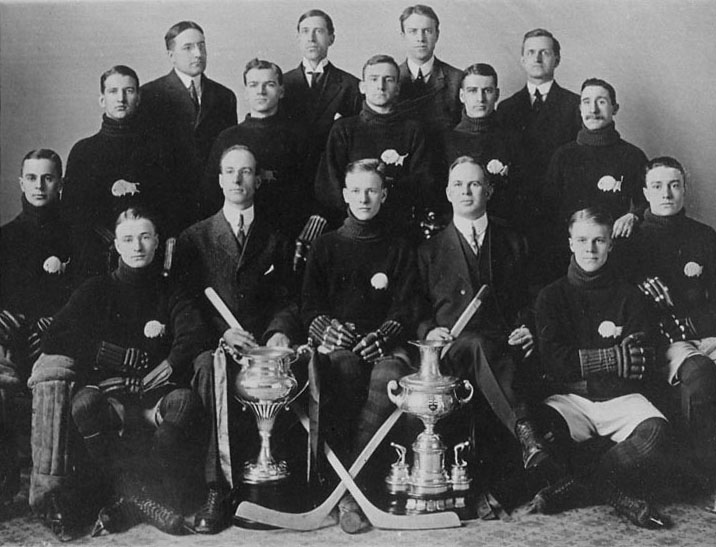
The Winnipeg Victorias with the Allan Cup in 1911

Robinson was asked by Allan Cup trustee William Northey, to schedule dates and referees to defend a challenge by the Kenora Thistles. The Victorias defeated Kenora by a combined score of 16–10 in a two-game series. The series profited approximately CA$1,500, which were donated by cup trustees to charities in Winnipeg chosen by Robinson. No further Allan Cup challenges were arranged for the season, despite proposals to play the Calgary Athletic Club and the Ottawa New Edinburghs.

The Victorias won the 1911–12 Manitoba Hockey League regular season, then defended the Allan Cup in three challenges. Robinson's team defeated the Calgary Athletic Club by 11–0 and 8–6 scores in a two-game series, defeated Toronto Eaton's by 8–4 and 16–1 scores in a two-game series, and the Regina Capitals by a 9–3 score in a one-game challenge. In 1942, Robinson described the victory versus Toronto Eaton's as redemption for winning the trophy by default from the OHA.

=== Honours ===
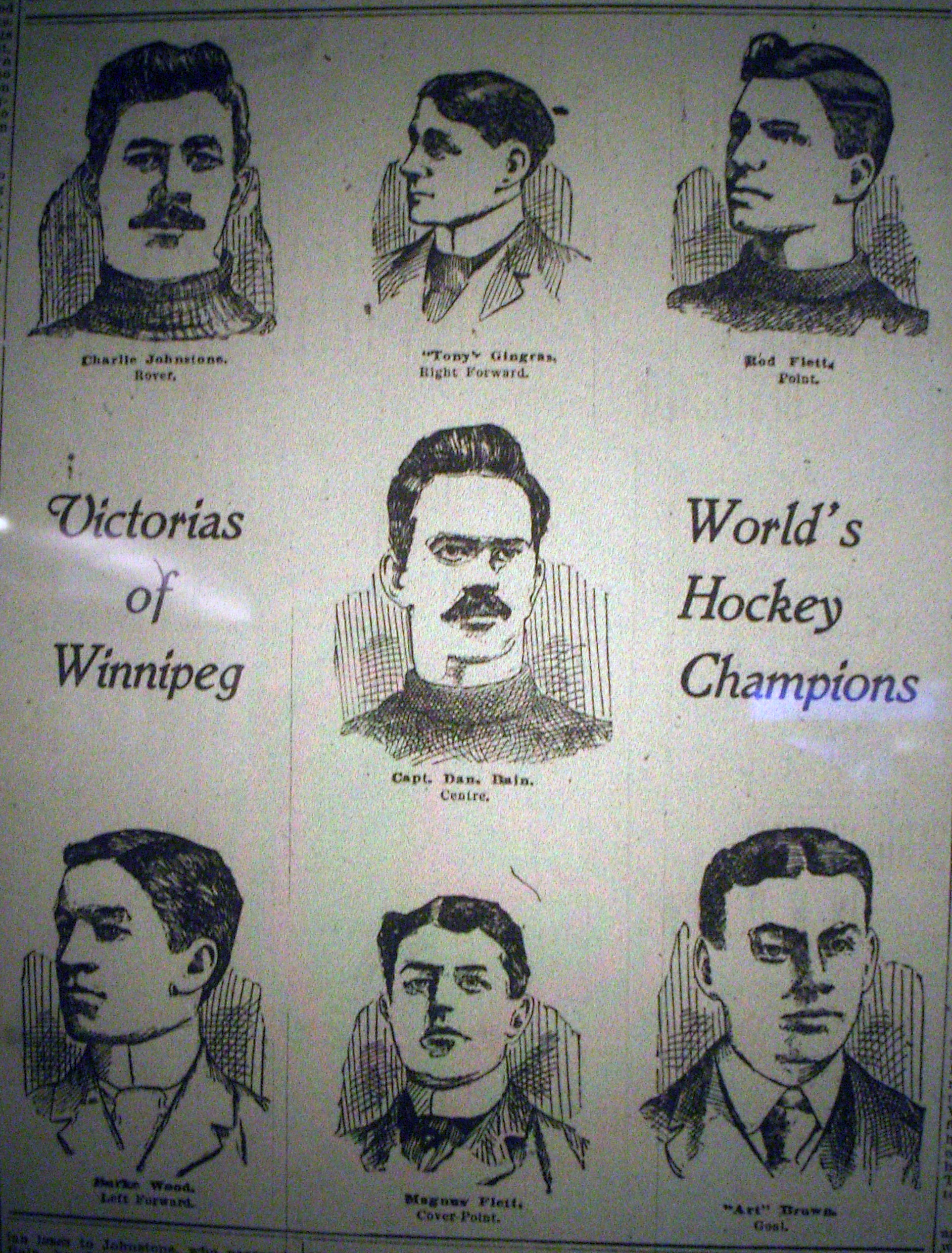
Winnipeg Victorias 1901

The 1896 and 1901 Stanley Cup champions, and the 1911 and 1912 Allan Cup champions Winnipeg Victorias are inducted into the Manitoba Hockey Hall of Fame and the Manitoba Sports Hall of Fame and Museum in the team category.

== Notable players ==
=== Hall of Fame members ===
- Dan Bain
- Herb Gardiner
- Jack Marshall
- Claude C. Robinson
- Fred Scanlan
- Bullet Joe Simpson

=== NHL alumni ===
- Percy Galbraith
- Herb Gardiner
- George McNaughton
- Charley McVeigh
- Joe Simpson
- Art Somers

== Championship rosters ==
=== 1896 Stanley Cup ===
Awarded February 14, 1896
George Merritt (goal), Rod Flett (point), Fred Higginbotham (cover point), Charles Johnstone (cover point), Dan Bain (center), Jack Armytage (rover - Captain), Colin "Tote" Campbell (left wing), Tom "Attie" Howard (right wing), Bobby R. Benson (spare-left-right wing), Jack Sheppard (goal-played 1 regular season game), E.B. Nixon (President), Able Code (Vice President/Manager), J. Carter (Mascot/Trainer).

After this 2–0 win over the similarly named Montreal Victorias, the very first Stanley Cup parade was held in Winnipeg on Main Street celebrating this victory.

=== 1901 Stanley Cup ===
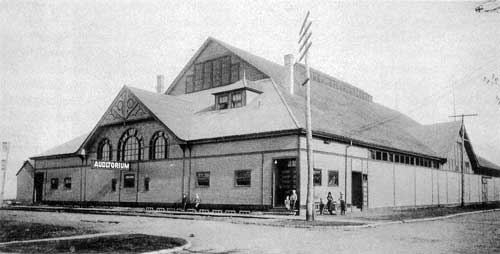
Winnipeg Auditorium, c. 1900

Awarded January 31, 1901
Art Brown (goal), Rod Flett (point), Jack Marshall (point), Magnus Flett (cover point), Burke Wood (rover), Dan Bain (center - Captain), Fred Cadham (center), Charles Johnstone (left wing), Tony Gingras (right wing), George A. Carruthers (right wing), Jack Armytage (President), Mark Hooper (Trainer), Ted Robinson (Secretary-treasurer), Walter Pratt (Director).

=== 1902 Stanley Cup ===
Awarded January 23, 1902
Art Brown (goal), Dan Bain (center - Captain), Fred Cadham (Center), Rod Flett (point), Magnus Flett (cover point), Tony Gingras (right wing), Charles Johnstone (left wing/rover), Fred Scanlan (left wing), Burke Wood (rover), Jack Armytage (President), Mark Hooper (Trainer), Ted Robinson (Secretary-treasurer), Walter Pratt (Director).

== See also ==
- List of Stanley Cup champions
- List of ice hockey teams in Manitoba

Preceded by Montreal HC; 1894	Winnipeg Victorias; Stanley Cup Champions; 1896	Succeeded by Montreal Victorias; December 1896
