= Art Ross Cup =

Art Ross Trophy
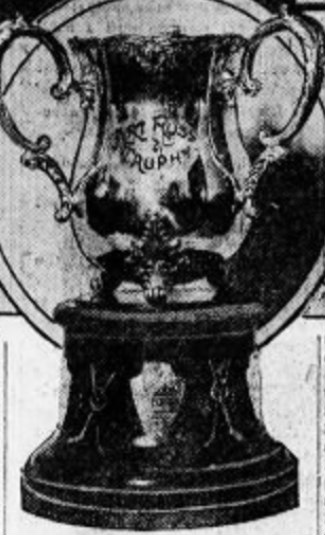
- Sport: Ice hockey
- Competition: Challenge games

History
- First award: 1913
- First winner: Montreal Champêtre (MCHL)
- Most recent: Montreal Hochelaga (MHL) – 1920

The Art Ross Trophy, more commonly referred to as the Art Ross Cup, was an amateur challenge ice hockey trophy which was competed for between 1913 and 1920.

== History ==
The Art Ross Trophy got its name from its donator, the ice hockey player and manager Art Ross, and was first competed for between amateur teams from Montreal and Quebec City which were ineligible to compete for the Allan Cup. The first winners were the Montreal Champêtre in 1913, as champions of the Montreal City Hockey League. The trophy soon got open for amateur challengers from outside of Quebec and in December 1915 the St. Nicholas Hockey Club from New York, with future Hockey Hall of Fame inductee Hobey Baker on the team, challenged for the trophy against the Montreal Stars, but the series ended in a tie which meant the trophy stayed in Canada.
