= List of Stanley Cup challenge games =

During the period from 1893 to 1914, the Stanley Cup was a "challenge trophy"; the champions held the Cup until they lost their league title to another club, or a champion from another league issued a formal challenge and subsequently defeated them in a special game or series. The competitive format of each challenge was determined by negotiation between the two clubs, and the contesting clubs did indeed make several arrangements during this 22-year period.

Before 1912, challenges could take place at any time, given the appropriate rink conditions, and it was common for teams to defend the Cup numerous times during the year. In 1912, the Cup's trustees declared that the Cup was only to be defended at the end of the champion team's regular season.

Also during this era, all of the leagues that played for the trophy had no annual formal playoff system to decide their own respective championships; whoever finished in first place after the regular season won the league title. Thus, a few league championship games or series were held just to break first place ties and determine who would keep the Cup. These league title games have historically been listed along with the regular inter-league Cup challenges.

== Champions ==
Lord Stanley of Preston introduced the Stanley Cup in 1892 and it was first awarded at the end of winter 1893 to the league champion Montreal Hockey Club (Montreal HC). The same club won a playoff at the end of the 1894 season, which is considered the first "Stanley Cup challenge" although four clubs were involved in the process and three teams played games. Montreal HC lost the Cup by losing its league in 1895, decided early in March. The challenge system, as opposed to the Challenge Era, probably truly began sometime thereafter.

=== Season record ===
This table lists all the champions of the Stanley Cup per hockey season during the challenge era. A season did not have official dates as rinks were natural ice, so season roughly corresponds to winter. The leagues typically started close to the beginning of the calendar year and ended in early March.

Season	Champion at end of season	Other champion during season
1892–93	Montreal HC (AHAC)	
1893–94	Montreal HC (AHAC)	
1894–95	Montreal Victorias (AHAC)	Montreal HC (AHAC)
1895–96	Winnipeg Victorias (MHA)	
1896–97	Montreal Victorias (AHAC)	
1897–98	Montreal Victorias (AHAC)	
1898–99	Montreal Shamrocks (CAHL)	Montreal Victorias (CAHL)
1899–1900	Montreal Shamrocks (CAHL)	
1900–01	Winnipeg Victorias (MHA)	
1901–02	Montreal HC (CAHL)	Winnipeg Victorias (MHA)
1902–03	Ottawa HC (CAHL)	Montreal HC (CAHL)
1903–04	Ottawa HC	
1904–05	Ottawa HC (FAHL)	
1905–06	Montreal Wanderers (ECAHA)	Ottawa HC (ECAHA)
1906–07	Montreal Wanderers (ECAHA)	Kenora Thistles (MPHL)
1907–08	Montreal Wanderers (ECAHA)	
1908–09	Ottawa HC (ECAHA)	Montreal Wanderers (ECAHA)
1909–10	Montreal Wanderers (NHA)	Ottawa HC (CHA/NHA)
1910–11	Ottawa HC (NHA)	
1911–12	Quebec Bulldogs (NHA)	
1912–13	Quebec Bulldogs (NHA)	
1913–14	Toronto Blueshirts (NHA)	

=== Yearly record ===
This table lists all the champions of the Stanley Cup per year during the challenge era. Annual Stanley Cup Final series did not begin until 1915, before which time there often were two different champions in a single year, and as many as five different championships.

Year	Times Cup Awarded	Champions
1893	1	Montreal HC (March 9)
1894	1	Montreal HC (March 22)
1895	2	Montreal Victorias (March 8); Montreal HC (March 9)
1896	3	Winnipeg Victorias (February 14); Winnipeg Victorias (February 29); Montreal Victorias (December 30)
1897	2	Montreal Victorias (February 27); Montreal Victorias (December 27)
1898	1	Montreal Victorias (February 19)
1899	3	Montreal Victorias (February 18); Montreal Shamrocks (March 4); Montreal Shamrocks (March 14)
1900	3	Montreal Shamrocks (February 15); Montreal Shamrocks (March 1); Montreal Shamrocks (March 7)
1901	1	Winnipeg Victorias (January 31); Winnipeg Victorias (February 19)
1902	2	Winnipeg Victorias (January 23); Montreal HC (March 17)
1903	3	Montreal HC (February 4); Ottawa HC (March 10); Ottawa HC (March 14)
1904	4	Ottawa HC (January 4); Ottawa HC (February 25); Ottawa HC (March 2); Ottawa HC (March 11)
1905	3	Ottawa HC (January 16); Ottawa HC (March 3); Ottawa HC (March 9)
1906	4	Ottawa HC (February 28); Ottawa HC (March 8); Montreal Wanderers (March 17); Montreal Wanderers (December 29)
1907	3	Kenora Thistles (January 23); Kenora Thistles (March 18); Montreal Wanderers (March 25)
1908	5	Montreal Wanderers (January 13); Montreal Wanderers (March 7); Montreal Wanderers (March 12); Montreal Wanderers (March 14); Montreal Wanderers (December 30)
1909	1	Ottawa HC (March 6)
1910	4	Ottawa HC (January 7); Ottawa HC (January 20); Montreal Wanderers (March 9); Montreal Wanderers (March 12)
1911	3	Ottawa HC (March 10); Ottawa HC (March 13); Ottawa HC (March 16)
1912	2	Quebec Bulldogs (March 5); Quebec Bulldogs (March 13)
1913	2	Quebec Bulldogs (March 5); Quebec Bulldogs (March 10)
1914	2	Toronto Blueshirts (March 11); Toronto Blueshirts (March 19)

== 1893–94 ==
The first Stanley Cup playoff game occurred on March 17, 1894. At the end of the Amateur Hockey Association of Canada season, four teams tied for the AHAC championship with records of 5–3–0. This created problems for the AHAC governors and the Cup's trustees since there was no tiebreaking system in place. After long negotiation and the withdrawal of Quebec from the championship situation, it was decided that a three-team tournament would take place in Montreal, with the Ottawa Hockey Club getting a bye to the finals (being the sole "road" team). In the first Stanley Cup playoff game ever, the Montreal Hockey Club defeated the Montreal Victorias, 3–2. Five days later in the first Stanley Cup Final game, the Montreal HC successfully defended their title with a 3–1 win over Ottawa.

Date	Winning Team	Score	Losing Team	Location
March 17, 1894	Montreal HC	3–2	Montreal Victorias	Victoria Rink

Date	Winning Team	Score	Losing Team	Location
March 22, 1894	Montreal HC	3–1	Ottawa	Victoria Rink

Later in the year, the Cup trustees accepted a challenge from the squad from Osgoode Hall, the champions of the Ontario Hockey Association (OHA). However, the series was eventually cancelled because of the lack of ice.

== 1894–95 ==
On March 8, 1895, the Montreal Victorias won the 1895 AHAC title and thus the Stanley Cup, after finishing the season with a 6–2 record. However, a challenge game was scheduled earlier for the next day between the previous year's champion Montreal HC and the squad from Queen's University, which was then part of the Ontario Hockey Association. Thus, it was decided that if the Montreal HC won the challenge match, the Victorias would become the Stanley Cup champions. The Montreal HC would eventually win the game, 5–1, and their crosstown rivals were crowned the champions.

Date	Winning Team	Score	Losing Team	Location
March 9, 1895	Montreal HC	5–1	Queen's University	Victoria Rink
Montreal Victorias wins the Cup based on winning the AHA title, and Montreal HC defeating Queen's University. Montreal HC were never recognized as Stanley Cup Champions in 1895, even though they won first challenge series from another hockey league.

Billy Barlow, the star player of Montreal was not able to play and Clarence McKerrow took his place. McKerrow had not played any games for Montreal, and could be considered a ringer, but there was no protest from Queen's.

The Queen's team, although described as looking fast in their tiger jerseys, were no match for Montreal and the game proved uninteresting.

== 1895–96 ==
The first successful challenge to the Cup came in February 1896 by the Winnipeg Victorias, the champions of the Manitoba Hockey Association (MHA). On February 14, Winnipeg beat defending champion Montreal, 2–0, becoming the first team outside the AHAC to win the Cup.

Date	Winning Team	Score	Losing Team	Location
February 14, 1896	Winnipeg Victorias	2–0	Montreal Victorias	Victoria Rink

== 1896–97 ==
The Montreal Victorias won the 1896 AHAC title by finishing the season with a 7–1 record, and subsequently demanded a rematch for the Cup. However, it was delayed until December 30 due to unsuitable ice conditions in Montreal. In what was said to be the most anticipated hockey game of the time, the Montreal Victorias defeated the Winnipeg Victorias, 6–5, to reclaim the Cup.

Date	Winning Team	Score	Losing Team	Location
December 30, 1896	Montreal Victorias	6–5	Winnipeg Victorias	Granite Rink, Winnipeg

== 1897–98 ==
Another 7–1 record earned the Montreal Victorias the 1897 AHAC title, and the team subsequently received a challenge from the Ottawa Capitals, champions of the Central Canada Hockey Association (CCHA). It was originally scheduled as the first best-of-three challenge, but the series ended after the first game because the Victorias clearly was the superior team with a 15–2 victory.

Date	Winning Team	Score	Losing Team	Location
December 27, 1897	Montreal Victorias	15–2	Ottawa Capitals	Victoria Rink

The Montreal Victorias again won the AHAC championship after finishing the 1898 AHAC season undefeated with an 8–0 record. As a result, no one challenged the Victorias for the Cup.

== 1898–99 ==
Prior to the start of the 1898–99 season, the AHAC dissolved. The defending Cup champion Montreal Victorias along with several other former AHAC members formed the Canadian Amateur Hockey League (CAHL).

Montreal then received another challenge from the MHA's Winnipeg Victorias. This time, it was decided that they would play a two-game total goals series in February 1899.

The second game ended in controversy. With Montreal leading the game 3–2 with about 12 minutes left in the game, Montreal's Bob Macdougall violently slashed Winnipeg's Tony Gingras. As Gingras was carried off the ice, referee Bill Findlay only called Macdougall for a two-minute minor. Angry that he should have been accessed a larger penalty, Winnipeg went into their dressing room in protest. Insulted, Findlay abruptly went home, but returned after officials followed him on a sleigh and persuaded him to return. Once back at the rink, the referee gave Winnipeg 15 minutes to return to the ice themselves. They refused and thus Findlay disqualified the team and declared Montreal the winners.

Date	Winning Team	Score	Losing Team	Location
February 15, 1899	Montreal Victorias	2–1	Winnipeg Victorias	Montreal Arena, Montreal
February 18, 1899	Montreal Victorias	3–2	Winnipeg Victorias	Montreal Arena, Montreal
Montreal wins total goals series 5 goals to 3

Two weeks after the Montreal Victorias defeated Winnipeg in their two-game total goals series, they lost the 1899 CAHL title, and thus the Cup, to the Montreal Shamrocks. The Shamrocks compiled a 7–1 season record while the Victorias finished one game back at 6–2. The Shamrocks then played a challenge game against Queen's University on March 14, defeating them 6–2.

Date	Winning Team	Score	Losing Team	Location
March 14, 1899	Montreal Shamrocks	6–2	Queen's University	Montreal Arena

== 1899–1900 ==
The MHA's Winnipeg Victorias issued another challenge for the Cup. This time, a best-of-three series was played against the defending champion Montreal Shamrocks. Winnipeg won the first game, 4–3, but Montreal prevailed in the next two games, 3–2 and 5–4.

Date	Winning Team	Score	Losing Team	Location
February 12, 1900	Winnipeg Victorias	4–3	Montreal Shamrocks	Montreal Arena
February 14, 1900	Montreal Shamrocks	3–2	Winnipeg Victorias	Montreal Arena
February 16, 1900	Montreal Shamrocks	5–4	Winnipeg Victorias	Montreal Arena
Montreal wins best-of-three series 2 games to 1

In March, the Shamrocks finished the 1900 CAHL season in first place, and thus the league championship, with a 7–1 record and then received another challenge for the Cup. However, the Halifax Crescents of the Halifax City Hockey League (Maritime champions) did not pose much of a threat as Montreal crushed them, 10–2 and 11–0.

Date	Winning Team	Score	Losing Team	Location
March 5, 1900	Montreal Shamrocks	10–2	Halifax Crescents	Montreal Arena
March 7, 1900	Montreal Shamrocks	11–0	Halifax Crescents	Montreal Arena
Montreal wins best-of-three series 2 games to 0

== 1900–01 ==
In January 1901, the Winnipeg Victorias again challenged the Montreal Shamrocks for the Cup. This time, Winnipeg prevailed, sweeping the best-of-three series with scores of 4–3 and 2–1. Game two was the first overtime game in Cup history with Dan Bain scoring at the four-minute mark of the extra period.

Date	Winning Team	Score	Losing Team	Location	Notes
January 29, 1901	Winnipeg Victorias	4–3	Montreal Shamrocks	Montreal Arena	
January 31, 1901	Winnipeg Victorias	2–1	Montreal Shamrocks	Montreal Arena	4:00, OT
Winnipeg wins best-of-three series 2 games to 0

== 1901–02 ==
In January 1902, the OHA's Toronto Wellingtons challenged the Winnipeg Victorias for the Cup in a best-of-three series, but Winnipeg swept Toronto in two games with identical 5–3 scores.

Date	Winning Team	Score	Losing Team	Location
January 21, 1902	Winnipeg Victorias	5–3	Toronto Wellingtons	Winnipeg Auditorium
January 23, 1902	Winnipeg Victorias	5–3	Toronto Wellingtons	Winnipeg Auditorium
Winnipeg wins best-of-three series 2 games to 0

After the Montreal HC won the 1902 CAHL title in March, they promptly sent a challenge to the Winnipeg Victorias. In game one of the best-of-three series, Winnipeg shutout Montreal, 1–0. However, Montreal shutout Winnipeg in game two, 5–0, and then held on to a 2–1 victory in game three. With the victory, the Montreal club won the Cup for the first time since 1894. The win earned the players the nickname of "Little Men of Iron" for their effort in holding off Winnipeg in the closing moments of game three.

Date	Winning Team	Score	Losing Team	Location
March 13, 1902	Winnipeg Victorias	1–0	Montreal HC	Winnipeg Auditorium
March 15, 1902	Montreal HC	5–0	Winnipeg Victorias	Winnipeg Auditorium
March 17, 1902	Montreal HC	2–1	Winnipeg Victorias	Winnipeg Auditorium
Montreal wins best-of-three series 2 games to 1

== 1902–03 ==
Another Montreal HC vs. Winnipeg Victorias best-of-three challenge series was held in early 1903. In the first game, defending champion Montreal defeated Winnipeg, 8–1. The second game was the first Stanley Cup challenge match to be replayed. Both teams skated to a 2–2 tie before the game had to be suspended at 27:00 of overtime because of a midnight curfew. It was then decided to discard the result and replay the game two days later. In the rescheduled contest, the Victorias won, 4–2, to even the series. However, Montreal won the decisive third game, 4–1, to retain the Cup.

Date	Winning Team	Score	Losing Team	Location
January 29, 1903	Montreal HC	8–1	Winnipeg Victorias	Montreal Arena
January 31, 1903	Suspended at 27:00 of overtime due to curfew and the 2–2 tie was discarded			Montreal Arena
February 2, 1903	Winnipeg Victorias	4–2	Montreal HC	Montreal Arena
February 4, 1903	Montreal HC	4–1	Winnipeg Victorias	Montreal Arena
Montreal wins best-of-three series 2 games to 1

In March, the 1903 CAHL season ended with the Montreal Victorias and the Ottawa Hockey Club tied for first place with identical 6–2 records. To determine the CAHL champion, and thus succeed the Montreal HC as the Cup champion, a two-game total goals series was held between the two teams. The first game was held in Montreal ending in a 1–1 tie. The second game was played in Ottawa, with the Ottawas dominating the Victorias, 8–0. The Ottawas thus won the Cup by winning the CAHL.

As the new CAHL and Cup champions, the Ottawas accepted a challenge from the Rat Portage Thistles of the Manitoba & Northwestern Hockey Association (MNWHA). Entering the best-of-three challenge series, the Thistles were younger and quicker than Ottawa; only one player on the Thistles was over the age of 20. However, poor soft ice conditions in Ottawa played a major factor as the Ottawas swept the series with scores of 6–2 and 4–2.

Date	Winning Team	Score	Losing Team	Location
March 12, 1903	Ottawa HC	6–2	Rat Portage Thistles	Dey's Arena
March 14, 1903	Ottawa HC	4–2	Rat Portage Thistles	Dey's Arena
Ottawa wins best-of-three series 2 games to 0

For their win, the Ottawa players each received a silver nugget from team director Bob Shillington. This is the origin of the nickname of the Silver Seven.

== 1903–04 ==
In January 1904, a best-of-three Cup challenge series was held between the defending champion Ottawa Hockey Club (aka Silver Seven) and the MHA's Winnipeg Rowing Club. Ottawa crushed Winnipeg, 9–1, in the first game but the Rowing Club rebounded with a 6–2 victory in the second. The Silver Seven then won the deciding third game, 2–0. This series marked the first time that goal lines were drawn across the ice from post to post.

Date	Winning Team	Score	Losing Team	Location
December 30, 1903	Ottawa HC	9–1	Winnipeg Rowing Club	Aberdeen Pavilion, Ottawa
January 1, 1904	Winnipeg Rowing Club	6–2	Ottawa	Aberdeen Pavilion, Ottawa
January 4, 1904	Ottawa HC	2–0	Winnipeg Rowing Club	Aberdeen Pavilion, Ottawa
Ottawa HC wins best-of-three series 2 games to 1

On January 30, 1904, a CAHL league game between the Ottawas and the Montreal Victorias started late and the game ended at the midnight curfew, with Ottawa leading 4–1. The CAHL ordered the game to be replayed, and the ensuing debate caused the Ottawas to withdraw from the CAHL. The CAHL hoped that without Ottawa, the Cup would remain with the CAHL and be given to its new league champion, the Quebec Bulldogs. However, the Cup trustees decided otherwise, and although the Silver Seven were not affiliated with any league for the rest of the season, they could still receive challenges. About a month later, Ottawa swept a best-of-three Cup series against the OHA's Toronto Marlboros with scores of 6–3 and 11–2.

Date	Winning Team	Score	Losing Team	Location
February 23, 1904	Ottawa HC	6–3	Toronto Marlboros	Aberdeen Pavilion, Ottawa
February 25, 1904	Ottawa HC	11–2	Toronto Marlboros	Aberdeen Pavilion, Ottawa
Ottawa HC wins best-of-three series 2 games to 0

In early March, the Montreal Wanderers of the Federal Amateur Hockey League (FAHL) challenged the Senators for the Cup. In the first game, played in Montreal, the teams played to a 5–5 tie at the end of regulation and the Wanderers refused to play overtime with the current referee. The Cup trustees ordered the series to restart with both games played in Ottawa. However, Montreal refused unless the first game was replayed at home. The Wanderers were disqualified and the Silver Seven retained the Cup.

Date	Winning Team	Score	Losing Team	Location
March 2, 1904	Ended in a 5–5 tie			Montreal Arena
Ottawa wins series; Montreal is disqualified for refusing to play games in Ottawa

A week later, Ottawa HC was challenged by the MNHA's Brandon Wheat City HC, but prevailed in another two game sweep with scores of 6–3 and 9–3.

Date	Winning Team	Score	Losing Team	Location
March 9, 1904	Ottawa HC	6–3	Brandon Wheat City	Aberdeen Pavilion, Ottawa
March 11, 1904	Ottawa HC	9–3	Brandon Wheat City	Aberdeen Pavilion, Ottawa
Ottawa wins best-of-three series 2 games to 0

== 1904–05 ==
The Ottawa HC joined the FAHL for the 1904–1905 season.

=== Ottawa vs. Dawson City ===
In January 1905, the Ottawas were challenged by the Dawson City Nuggets who travelled 4,000 miles (6,400 km) from the Yukon to Ottawa for a best-of-three Cup challenge series. The Nuggets actually left Dawson City on December 19, 1904 and travelled on a month-long journey by dog sled and walking (Dawson to Whitehorse), ship (Skagway to Vancouver), and train (Whitehorse to Skagway, and Vancouver to Ottawa). Largely because of the long trip, they were no match for the Silver Seven. Ottawa defeated Dawson City in the first game by a score of 9–2. Numerous Stanley Cup records were then set in the second game, including Frank McGee's 14 goals, and a 23–2 rout, the largest margin of victory for any challenge game or Stanley Cup Final game to date as of 2024.

Date	Winning Team	Score	Losing Team	Location
January 13, 1905	Ottawa HC	9–2	Dawson City Nuggets	Dey's Arena
January 16, 1905	Ottawa HC	23–2	Dawson City Nuggets	Dey's Arena
Ottawa HC wins best-of-three series 2 games to 0

=== Ottawa vs. Rat Portage ===
Ottawa eventually won the 1905 FAHL title by finishing in first place with a 7–1 record. Then in March, the Rat Portage Thistles issued another challenge to the Ottawas. Although the Thistles crushed Ottawa in the first game, 9–3, Ottawa was without Frank McGee who did not play. However, McGee returned to lead the Ottawas to 4–2 and 5–4 victories in the second and third games to win the series.

Date	Winning Team	Score	Losing Team	Location
March 7, 1905	Rat Portage Thistles	9–3	Ottawa HC	Dey's Arena
March 9, 1905	Ottawa HC	4–2	Rat Portage Thistles	Dey's Arena
March 11, 1905	Ottawa HC	5–4	Rat Portage Thistles	Dey's Arena
Ottawa HC wins best-of-three series 2 games to 1

On the same day that the third game of the Thistles - Ottawa series was played, the 1905 CAHL season ended with the Montreal Victorias winning the title. The Cup trustees accepted their challenge, however, the Montreal-Ottawa series was eventually cancelled because the trustees and the Victorias could not agree on either the game dates or the playoff series format.

== 1905–06 ==
For the 1905–06 season, the Ottawa HC (aka Silver Seven) joined the new Eastern Canada Amateur Hockey Association (ECAHA). In February, Ottawa played a best-of-three challenge series against OHA champion Queen's University, but the Senators proved to be the better team as they swept the series with 16–7 and 12–7 victories.

Date	Winning Team	Score	Losing Team	Location
February 27, 1906	Ottawa HC	16–7	Queen's University	Dey's Arena
February 28, 1906	Ottawa HC	12–7	Queen's University	Dey's Arena
Ottawa HC wins best-of-three series 2 games to 0

About a week later, Smiths Falls, the FAHL champions, issued a challenge for the Cup, but they suffered the same fate as Queen's University. The Ottawas defeated them with scores of 6–5 and 8–2 to defend the Cup. Ottawa management was so impressed with Smiths Falls goalie Percy LeSueur that they signed him to join the Ottawas a few days after the series ended.

Date	Winning Team	Score	Losing Team	Location
March 6, 1906	Ottawa HC	6–5	Smiths Falls	Dey's Arena
March 8, 1906	Ottawa HC	8–2	Smiths Falls	Dey's Arena
Ottawa HC wins best-of-three series 2 games to 0

The 1906 ECAHA season ended a few days later after the Smiths Falls - Ottawa series, with both Ottawa and the Montreal Wanderers tied for first place with identical 9–1 records. It was decided to hold a two-game total goals series to determine the league champion, and thus who would keep the Cup. The first game was played in Montreal where the Wanderers promptly crushed the Ottawas, 9–1. Needing at least an eight-goal victory in the rematch in Ottawa, the newly signed LeSueur was named Ottawa's starting goalie, and the Ottawas jumped to a 9–1 lead to tie the series. But with under 5 minutes to go, Montreal's Lester Patrick scored twice to clinch the series for the Wanderers, winning the total-goals series, 12–10 and taking over the Stanley Cup.

Date	Winning Team	Score	Losing Team	Location
March 14, 1906	Montreal Wanderers	9–1	Ottawa HC	Montreal Arena
March 17, 1906	Ottawa HC	9–3	Montreal Wanderers	Dey's Arena
Montreal wins total goals series 12 goals to 10

== 1906–07 ==
In December 1906, the New Glasgow Cubs, an amateur team from New Glasgow, Nova Scotia, issued a challenge to the Montreal Wanderers. In a two-game total goals series, Montreal easily defeated New Glasgow in both matches, 10–3 and 7–2. This was the first series in which professional players played for the Stanley Cup, as the Wanderers and other teams in the ECAHA were starting to mix amateurs with pros in their squads.

Date	Winning Team	Score	Losing Team	Location
December 27, 1906	Montreal Wanderers	10–3	New Glasgow Cubs	Montreal Arena
December 29, 1906	Montreal Wanderers	7–2	New Glasgow Cubs	Montreal Arena
Montreal wins total goals series 17 goals to 5

The Kenora Thistles (formerly the Rat Portage Thistles before the city changed its name to Kenora in 1904) challenged the Montreal Wanderers for the Cup in January 1907. Aided by future Hockey Hall of Famers Tom Hooper, Tommy Phillips, and Art Ross, the Thistles came away with 4–2 and 8–6 victories for a combined score of 12–8 to win a two-game total goals series. A "ringer", Ross was a member of the Brandon Wheat Kings and was borrowed by Kenora just for the challenge games.

Date	Winning Team	Score	Losing Team	Location
January 17, 1907	Kenora Thistles	4–2	Montreal Wanderers	Montreal Arena
January 21, 1907	Kenora Thistles	8–6	Montreal Wanderers	Montreal Arena
Kenora wins total goals series 12 goals to 8

In March, Kenora would play and win the Manitoba Professional Hockey League (MPHL) playoffs against Brandon to successfully defend the Cup. In a best-of-three, Kenora won 2–0.

Date	Winning Team	Score	Losing Team	Location
March 16, 1907	Kenora Thistles	8–6	Brandon Wheat City	Winnipeg Auditorium
March 18, 1907	Kenora Thistles	4–1	Brandon Wheat City	Winnipeg Auditorium
Kenora wins series 2–0

In March, the Wanderers won the 1907 ECAHA title by finishing the season undefeated with a 10–0 record. Montreal then requested a rematch with Kenora for the Cup. However, there were disagreements between both teams. The Wanderers did not want the Thistles to use their "ringers", Harry Westwick and Alf Smith from the Ottawa Senators. Kenora responded by refusing to play, citing the fact that Montreal used "ringers" in the earlier series. Eventually, the Wanderers withdrew their protest after the Thistles agreed to play the two-game total goals series in Winnipeg; Winnipeg Auditorium was much larger and thus guaranteed more ticket sales for the clubs to share. In the end, Montreal overcame Westwick and Smith as they compiled a combined score of 12–8 to win the series. Most of the Wanderers' margin-of-victory came in game one as they defeated the Thistles, 7–2. Kenora won game two, 6–5, but the one-goal victory was not enough.

Date	Winning Team	Score	Losing Team	Location
March 23, 1907	Montreal Wanderers	7–2	Kenora Thistles	Winnipeg Auditorium
March 25, 1907	Kenora Thistles	6–5	Montreal Wanderers	Winnipeg Auditorium
Montreal wins total goals series 12 goals to 8

== 1907–08 ==
Although the Montreal Wanderers won the 1908 ECAHA title by finishing the season with an 8–2 record, they played in three Cup challenges that season. In January, they defeated the 1907 FAHL champion Ottawa Victorias, 22–4, in a two-game total goals series. Ernie Russell scored 10 goals as he led the Wanderers to 9–3 and 13–1 victories.

Date	Winning Team	Score	Losing Team	Location
January 9, 1908	Montreal Wanderers	9–3	Ottawa Victorias	Montreal Arena
January 13, 1908	Montreal Wanderers	13–1	Ottawa Victorias	Montreal Arena
Montreal wins total goals series 22 goals to 4

The Winnipeg Maple Leafs of the MHL challenged Montreal for the Cup in March, but the Wanderers came away with 11–5 and 9–3 wins to clinch the two-game total goals series, 20–8.

Date	Winning Team	Score	Losing Team	Location
March 10, 1908	Montreal Wanderers	11–5	Winnipeg Maple Leafs	Montreal Arena
March 12, 1908	Montreal Wanderers	9–3	Winnipeg Maple Leafs	Montreal Arena
Montreal wins total goals series 20 goals to 8

Montreal's greatest challenge happened two days later when they played a single-elimination game against the Toronto Professional HC. Toronto was the champion of the newly established Ontario Professional Hockey League (OPHL), and was the first all-professional team to compete for the Cup. However, the Wanderers prevailed, 6–4, with two late goals by Ernie Johnson and Bruce Stuart.

Date	Winning Team	Score	Losing Team	Location
March 14, 1908	Montreal Wanderers	6–4	Toronto Pros	Montreal Arena

== 1908–09 ==
In December 1908, Montreal played its first Cup challenge of the season, this time against the Edmonton Hockey Club of the Alberta Amateur Hockey Association (AAHA). Edmonton entered the series with an all-time high of six "ringers". In game one, Harry Smith scored five goals as he led the Wanderers to a 7–3 victory. The Edmontons won game two, 7–6, but Montreal took the two-game total goals series, 13–10.

Date	Winning Team	Score	Losing Team	Location
December 28, 1908	Montreal Wanderers	7–3	Edmonton HC	Montreal Arena
December 30, 1908	Edmonton HC	7–6	Montreal Wanderers	Montreal Arena
Montreal wins total goals series 13 goals to 10

Prior to the start of the new season, the Montreal HC and the Montreal Victorias, the last remaining amateur teams, left the ECAHA, and the league dropped "Amateur" from its name to become an all-pro league. The 1909 ECHA season ended with the defending Cup champion Montreal Wanderers finishing in second place with a 9–3 record, behind the first place Ottawa HC who finished at 10–2. Thus Ottawa HC won the league championship and were awarded the Cup.

Ottawa received a challenge only from the Winnipeg Shamrocks, but it was too late in the season to set a date.

== 1909–10 ==
In an effort to freeze out the Montreal Wanderers, the ECHA disbanded in December 1909 and a new league called the Canadian Hockey Association (CHA) was formed, deliberately designed to exclude the Wanderers. While the Wanderers were forced to join the newly formed National Hockey Association (NHA), the defending Cup champion Ottawa HC still had to accept challenges. In January 1910, they played a two-game total goals series against Galt, champions of the OPHL, but prevailed with 12–3 and 3–1 victories. Marty Walsh led Ottawa with 6 goals.

Date	Winning Team	Score	Losing Team	Location
January 5, 1910	Ottawa HC	12–3	Galt	Dey's Arena
January 7, 1910	Ottawa HC	3–1	Galt	Dey's Arena
Ottawa HC wins total goals series 15 goals to 4

Soon after the Galt-Ottawa challenge series ended, the CHA folded because of financial difficulties, and Ottawa was admitted into the NHA. The Senators then played a two-game total goals series against the Edmonton Hockey Club, but Gordie Roberts' seven goals helped Ottawa to victories of 8–4 and 13–7.

Date	Winning Team	Score	Losing Team	Location
January 18, 1910	Ottawa HC	8–4	Edmonton HC	Dey's Arena
January 20, 1910	Ottawa HC	13–7	Edmonton HC	Dey's Arena
Ottawa HC wins total goals series 21 goals to 11

When the 1910 NHA season ended in March, the Ottawas had to give the Cup to the Wanderers. Montreal finished in first place with an 11–1 record while Ottawa finished in second place at 9–3. The Wanderers then accepted challenge from the Berlin Dutchmen, who succeeded Galt as the OPHL champions. In the single-elimination game, Ernie Russell scored 4 goals as he led Montreal to a 7–3 win.

Date	Winning Team	Score	Losing Team	Location
March 12, 1910	Montreal Wanderers	7–3	Berlin Dutchmen	Jubilee Rink, Montreal

== 1910–11 ==
The Ottawa HC captured the NHA championship, and thus the Cup, after finishing the 1910–11 season in first place with a 13–3 record. The Ottawas then played in two Cup challenges during the month of March. In a one-game challenge on March 13, Ottawa defeated the Galt Professionals of the Ontario Professional Hockey League (OPHL), 7–4, aided by three goals by future hall of fame forward Marty Walsh.

Date	Winning Team	Score	Losing Team	Location
March 13, 1911	Ottawa HC	7–4	Galt	Dey's Arena

Three days later, the Ottawas played the Port Arthur Bearcats of the New Ontario Hockey League (NOHL) in another one-game final. Walsh scored ten goals as Ottawa crushed Port Arthur, 14–4.

Date	Winning Team	Score	Losing Team	Location
March 16, 1911	Ottawa HC	14–4	Port Arthur Bearcats	Dey's Arena

== 1911–12 ==
In 1912, Cup trustees declared that the Cup was only to be defended at the end of the champion team's regular season. As a result, anyone who wanted to challenge for the Cup had to wait until the 1911–12 NHA season concluded. When it ended, the Ottawa HC finished in second place, with a 9–9 record, behind the Quebec Bulldogs, who posted a 10–8 record to take the league championship and take over the Cup. The Bulldogs then went on to sweep the Moncton Victorias of the Maritime Professional Hockey League (MPHL) in a best-of-three Cup challenge series, with 9–3 and 8–0 victories.

Date	Winning Team	Score	Losing Team	Location
March 11, 1912	Quebec Bulldogs	9–3	Moncton Victorias	Quebec Skating Rink
March 13, 1912	Quebec Bulldogs	8–0	Moncton Victorias	Quebec Skating Rink
Quebec wins best-of-three series 2 games to 0

== 1912–13 ==
The 1912–13 NHA season ended with Quebec Bulldogs repeating as league champions. The Bulldogs then played a two-game total goals Cup challenge series versus the Sydney Millionaires of the Maritime Professional Hockey League (MPHL), with Quebec winning 20 goals to 5. Joe Malone scored 9 goals as he led the Bulldogs to a 14–3 win in the first game. Quebec then won the second by a score of 6–2, with Joe Hall earning a hat trick.

Date	Winning Team	Score	Losing Team	Location
March 8, 1913	Quebec Bulldogs	14–3	Sydney Millionaires	Quebec Skating Rink
March 10, 1913	Quebec Bulldogs	6–2	Sydney Millionaires	Quebec Skating Rink
Quebec wins total-goals series 20 goals to 5.

Later in the month, the Victoria Aristocrats of the Pacific Coast Hockey Association (PCHA) challenged Quebec. However, the Bulldogs refused to put the Cup on the line, so the two teams played a best-of-three exhibition series instead. In the first series ever between the champions of the two leagues, all of the games were played in Victoria, while the differing rules of the NHA and PCHA alternated between each contest. A major rule difference was the PCHA had seven-man rules while the NHA had six. The first game was played under PCHA rules and the Aristocrats recorded a 7–5 victory. Under NHA rules in the second game, Quebec won 6–3. But in the third game, under seven-man hockey, Victoria won the exhibition series with a 6–1 victory.

== 1913–14 ==
At the end of the 1913–14 NHA season, the Toronto Hockey Club and the Montreal Canadiens were tied for first place with identical 13–7 records. To determine the NHA title and the new Cup champions, both teams played a two-game total goals series. Each team recorded shutouts on its home ice: Montreal won the first game, 2–0, but Toronto came back to win the second game, 6–0. The Blue Shirts won the series, 6 goals to 2. Game two in Toronto was the first Stanley Cup playoff game ever played on artificial ice.

Date	Winning Team	Score	Losing Team	Location
March 7, 1914	Montreal Canadiens	2–0	Toronto Blue Shirts	Montreal Arena
March 11, 1914	Toronto Blue Shirts	6–0	Montreal Canadiens	Arena Gardens
Toronto wins total goals series 6 goals to 2

Later in the month, Toronto and the PCHA's Victoria Aristocrats played a best-of-five series for the Cup. A controversy occurred when it was revealed that the Victoria club had not filed a formal challenge. A letter arrived from the Stanley Cup trustees on March 17, stating that the trustees would not let the Stanley Cup travel west, as they did not consider Victoria a proper challenger because they had not formally notified the trustees. However, on March 18, Trustee William Foran stated that it was a misunderstanding. PCHA president Lester Patrick had not filed a challenge, because he had expected Emmett Quinn of the NHA to make all of the arrangements in his role as hockey commissioner, whereas the trustees thought they were being deliberately ignored. In any case, all arrangements had been ironed out and the Victoria challenge was accepted. As it turned out, the Blue Shirts swept the series to successfully defend the Cup with scores of 5–2, 6–5 in overtime, and 2–1.

After the series, Cup trustee Foran wrote to NHA president and hockey commissioner Quinn that the trustees are "perfectly satisfied to allow the representatives of the three pro leagues (NHA, PCHA and Maritime) to make all arrangements each season as to the series of matches to be played for the Cup." Thus ended the era of Stanley Cup series arranged by the trustees.

Date	Winning Team	Score	Losing Team	Location	Notes
March 14, 1914	Toronto Blue Shirts	5–2	Victoria Aristocrats	Arena Gardens	
March 17, 1914	Toronto Blue Shirts	6–5	Victoria Aristocrats	Arena Gardens	15:00, OT
March 19, 1914	Toronto Blue Shirts	2–1	Victoria Aristocrats	Arena Gardens	
Toronto wins best-of-five series 3 games to 0

== Table of participating teams ==
Legend: SC = successful Stanley Cup challenge or defense of championship (win); UC = unsuccessful Stanley Cup challenge or defense of championship (loss)

Team	SC	UC	Total	Win %
Ottawa HC	17	2	19	0.895
Montreal Wanderers	10	2	12	0.833
Winnipeg Victorias	6	5	11	0.545
Montreal Victorias	6	2	8	0.750
Montreal Shamrocks	5	1	6	0.833
Montreal HC	5	0	5	1.000
Quebec Bulldogs	4	0	4	1.000
Rat Portage/Kenora Thistles	2	3	5	0.400
Toronto Blueshirts	2	0	2	1.000
Queen's University	0	3	3	0.000
Brandon Wheat City Hockey Club	0	2	2	0.000
Edmonton HC	0	2	2	0.000
Galt HC	0	2	2	0.000
Winnipeg Maple Leafs	0	2	2	0.000

The following 16 teams unsuccessfully challenged for a Stanley Cup only once: Berlin Dutchmen, Dawson City Nuggets, Halifax Crescents, Moncton Victorias, Montreal Canadiens, New Glasgow Cubs, Ottawa Capitals, Ottawa Victorias, Port Arthur Bearcats, Smiths Falls, Sydney Millionaires, Toronto HC, Toronto Marlboros, Toronto Wellingtons, Victoria Aristocrats, Winnipeg Rowing Club.

== See also ==
- List of pre-NHL seasons
- List of Stanley Cup champions

Preceded by Montreal AAA; 1894	Stanley Cup champions 1894–1914	Succeeded by Vancouver Millionaires; 1915
