= 1901–02 MHA season =

Canadian ice hockey league season

The 1902 Manitoba Hockey Association (MHA) season consisted of a four game series between the Winnipeg HC and Winnipeg Victorias. As the Victorias were the defending Stanley Cup holder, they would play two challenges, against Toronto and Montreal.

== Regular season ==
=== Final standing ===
Team	Games Played	Wins	Losses	Ties	Goals For	Goals Against
Winnipeg Victorias	4	4	0	0	20	7
Winnipeg Hockey Club	4	0	4	0	7	20

== Stanley Cup challenges ==
As Stanley Cup champion, the Victorias accepted a challenge from Toronto Wellingtons, champions of the Ontario Hockey Association (OHA), played during the regular season. The first game was played under Ontario rules, the second under Manitoba rules. Unusually, in the first game a goal was scored by Rod Flett of Winnipeg, however this goal was into his own net. No Toronto player is credited for the goal, Mr. Flett is. Winnipeg would win the series 5–3, 5–3 (2–0).

=== Winnipeg vs. Toronto Wellingtons ===
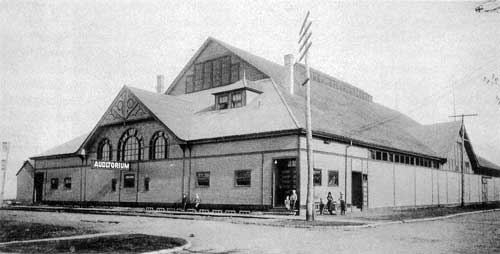
Winnipeg Auditorium, c. 1900

Date	Winning Team	Score	Losing Team	Location
January 21, 1902	Winnipeg Victorias	5–3	Toronto Wellingtons	Winnipeg Auditorium
January 23, 1902	Winnipeg Victorias	5–3	Toronto Wellingtons	Winnipeg Auditorium
Winnipeg wins best-of-three series 2 games to 0

January 21
Toronto	3	at	Winnipeg	5
Doug "Dutchie" Morrison		G	Art Brown
George Chadwick		P	Rod Flett
Irvin Ardagh		CP	Magnus Flett
George McKay	1	RO	Burke Wood	1
David "Worts" Smart	1	C	Fred Chadham	2
Charles "Chummy" Hill		LW	Fred Scanlan
Frank McLaren		RW	Tony Gingras	2

Flett scored for Toronto (own goal)

January 23
Toronto	3	at	Winnipeg	5
Doug "Dutchie" Morrison		G	Art Brown
George Chadwick		P	Rod Flett
Irvin Ardagh		CP	Magnus Flett
George McKay		RO	Burke Wood
David "Worts" Smart		C	Fred Cadham
Charles "Chummy" Hill		LW	Fred Scanlan
Frank McLaren		RW	Tony Gingras

Newspaper accounts omit the goal-scorers for the game.

=== Winnipeg vs. Montreal ===
After the Montreal HC won the 1902 CAHL title in March, they promptly sent a challenge to the Winnipeg Victorias and a best-of-three series was arranged. The season was mild, and there was an inch of water on the slushy ice for game one. Tony Gingras scored the only goal of game one and Winnipeg shut out Montreal, 1–0. Ice conditions improved for game two an Montreal shut out Winnipeg 5–0. In game three, Montreal took an early 2–0 lead after eleven minutes and then held on for a 2–1 victory. Winnipeg attacked furiously at the end, and Montreal's effort was described as "little men of iron" by Montreal Star sports editor Peter Spanjaardt. With the victory, the Montreal club won the Cup for the first time since 1894.

Jack Marshall of Montreal, who had played for the Winnipeg team in the previous year, faced his old team and scored three goals, including the series clincher. Art Hooper also scored three for Montreal.

Date	Winning Team	Score	Losing Team	Location
March 13, 1902	Winnipeg Victorias	1–0	Montreal HC	Winnipeg Auditorium
March 15, 1902	Montreal HC	5–0	Winnipeg Victorias	Winnipeg Auditorium
March 17, 1902	Montreal HC	2–1	Winnipeg Victorias	Winnipeg Auditorium
Montreal wins best-of-three series 2 games to 1

March 13
Montreal	0	at	Winnipeg	1
Billy Nicholson		G	Art Brown
Tom Hodge		P	Rod Flett
Dickie Boon, Capt.		CP	Magnus Flett
Art Hooper		RO	Fred Cadham
Jack Marshall		C	Burke Wood
Charles Liffiton		LW	Tony Gingras	1
Jimmy Gardner		RW	Fred Scanlon
Billy Bellinghan - Spare			Dan Bain - Spare - Capt.
Ronald Elliot - Spare			Charles Johnstone - Spare
George Smith - Spare
Referee- W. MacFarlane

March 15
Montreal	5	at	Winnipeg	0
Billy Nicholson		G	Art Brown
Billy Bellingham		P	Rod Flett
Dickie Boon, Capt		CP	Magnus Flett
Art Hooper	2	RO	Fred Cadham
Jack Marshall	2	C	Burke Wood
Ernie Liffiton	1	LW	Tony Gingras
Jimmy Gardner		RW	Fred Scanlon
Billy Bellinghan - Spare			Dan Bain - Spare - Capt.
Ronald Elliot - Spare			Charles Johnstone - Spare
George Smith - Spare
Referee- W. MacFarlane

March 17
Montreal	2	at	Winnipeg	1
Billy Nicholson		G	Art Brown
Billy Bellingham		P	Red Flett
Dickie Boon		CP	Magnus Flett
Art Hooper	1	RO	Fred Cadham
Jack Marshall	1	C	Burke Wood
Ernie Liffiton		LW	Tony Gingras	1
Jimmy Gardner		RW	Fred Scanlon
Billy Bellinghan - Spare			Dan Bain - Spare - Capt.
Ronald Elliot - Spare			Charles Johnstone - Spare
George Smith - Spare
Referee- W. MacFarlane

== Winnipeg Victorias January 1902 Stanley Cup champions ==
=== Players ===
Centres

- Dan Bain (Captain)
- Fred Cadham
- Burke Wood (rover)

Wingers

- Tony Gingras (right wing)
- Charles Johnstone (left wing/rover)
- Fred Scanlan (left wing)

Defencemen

- Rod Flett (point)
- Magnus Flett (cover point)

Goaltenders

- Art Brown

=== Coaching and administrative staff ===
- Jack Armytage (President), Mark Hooper (Trainer),
- Ted Robinson (Secretary/Treasurer), Walter Pratt (Director)

== See also ==
- List of Stanley Cup champions

Preceded by Winnipeg Victorias; 1901	Winnipeg Victorias; Stanley Cup Champions; January 1902	Succeeded by Montreal Hockey Club; 1902
Preceded by 1900–01	MHA seasons 1901–02	Succeeded by 1902–03
