= 1902–03 MHA season =

Canadian ice hockey league season

The 1902–03 Manitoba Hockey Association (MHA) season consisted of a six game series between the Winnipeg Rowing Club and the Winnipeg Victorias. To differentiate from the Manitoba & Northwestern Hockey Association, the league was known as the Western Canada Hockey Association. The Rowing Club won the series of the Winnipeg teams to take the championship, and went on to challenge for the Stanley Cup in the 1903–04 season.

== Regular season ==
=== Final standing ===
Team	Games Played	Wins	Losses	Ties	Points
Winnipeg Rowing Club	6	4	2	0	8
Winnipeg Victorias	6	2	4	0	4

Source: Zweig 2012

== See also ==
- List of Stanley Cup champions

Preceded by 1901–02	MHA seasons 1902–03	Succeeded by 1903–04
