= 1900–01 MHA season =

Ice hockey season

The 1900–01 MHA season of the Manitoba Hockey Association was played by two teams Winnipeg Victorias and Winnipeg HC. The Victorias, as defending champions, played and defeated the Montreal Shamrocks of the Canadian Amateur Hockey League (CAHL) in a Stanley Cup challenge to bring the Stanley Cup to Manitoba.

== Regular season ==
February 19, 1901

Victorias defeated Winnipeg 4 – 3 to win the Manitoba championship. After the season, the Victorias were presented with gold watches from the club. Honorary club president Hugh John Macdonald, former Manitoba premier, and son of former Canadian Prime Minister John A. Macdonald made a speech.

=== Final standings ===
Note: GP = Games played, W = Wins, L = Losses, T = Ties, Pts = Points

Club	GP	W	L	T	Pts
Winnipeg Victorias	4	4	0	0	8
Winnipeg Hockey Club	4	0	4	0	0

Source: Zweig

== Stanley Cup challenge ==
=== Shamrocks vs. Winnipeg ===
In January 1901, the Winnipeg Victorias again challenged the Montreal Shamrocks for the Cup. This time, Winnipeg prevailed, sweeping the best-of-three series with scores of 4–3 and 2–1. Game two was the first overtime game in Cup history with Dan Bain scoring at the four-minute mark of the extra period.

For the series, the Shamrocks added Montreal Victorias captain Mike Grant, replacing Frank Tansey. Winnipeg added Burke Wood and Jack Marshall. For Marshall, it would be the first Stanley Cup win of his career, a career in which he would with the Cup six times, with four teams.

Date	Winning Team	Score	Losing Team	Location	Notes
January 29, 1901	Winnipeg Victorias	4–3	Montreal Shamrocks	Montreal Arena	
January 31, 1901	Winnipeg Victorias	2–1	Montreal Shamrocks	Montreal Arena	4:00, OT
Winnipeg wins best-of-three series 2 games to 0

=== Game one ===
Winnipeg addition Burke Wood scored twice for Winnipeg to lead the team, including the winner with two minutes remaining.

January 29
Winnipeg	4	at	Shamrocks	3
Art Brown		G	Joe McKenna
Rod Flett		P	Mike Grant
Magnus Flett		CP	Frank Wall	1
Tony Gingras	1	F	Harry Trihey, Capt
Dan Bain, Capt	1	F	Jack P.Brannen	1
Charles Johnstone		F	Fred Scanlon
Burke Wood	2	F	Arthur Farrell	1
Fred Chadham		sub
Jack Marshall		sub
Referee - H. Baird; Umpires - A. McKerrow, R.Boon

=== Game two ===
Dan Bain scored late in the first half to put Winnipeg ahead. Harry Trihey tied it early in the second half. The game was tied to go to overtime. Bain scored the winner in overtime, the first Stanley Cup-winning goal scored in overtime.

January 31
Winnipeg	2	at	Shamrocks	1
Art Brown		G	Joe McKenna
Rod Flett		P	Mike Grant
Magnus Flett		CP	Frank Wall
Tony Gingras		F	Harry Trihey, Capt	1
Dan Bain, Capt	2	F	Jack P. Brannen
Charles Johnstone		F	Fred Scanlon
Burke Wood		F	Arthur Farrell
Fred Chadham		sub
Jack Marshall		sub
Referee - H. Baird; Umpires - A. McKerrow, R. Boon

== Stanley Cup engraving ==
=== Players ===
Forwards

- Burke Wood (rover)
- Dan Bain (center- captain)
- Tony Gingras (right wing)
- Charles Johnstone (left wing/rover)
- Fred Cadman (center/ring wing)
- George Carruthers (right wing)

Defencemen

- Rod Flett (point)
- Jack Marshall (point)
- Magnus Flett (cover point)

Goaltenders

- Art Brown

=== Coaching and administrative staff ===
- Jack Armytage (President), Mark Hooper (Trainer),
- Ted Robinson (Secretary/Treasurer), Walter Pratt (Director)

== See also ==
- 1901 CAHL season
- List of Stanley Cup champions

Preceded by Montreal Shamrocks; 1900	Winnipeg Victorias; 1901 Stanley Cup Champions	Succeeded by Winnipeg Victorias; January 1902
Preceded by 1899–1900	MHA seasons 1900–01	Succeeded by 1901–02
