= Winnipeg Auditorium =

Former indoor arena in Winnipeg, Manitoba

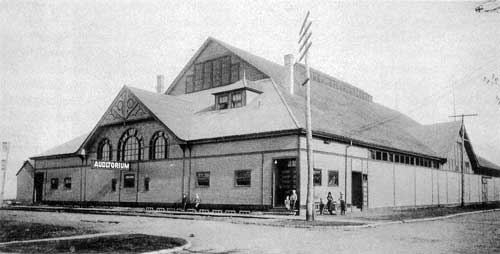
Winnipeg Auditorium, c. 1900

The Winnipeg Auditorium was an indoor arena in Winnipeg, Manitoba, Canada. It was the premier site for ice hockey in Winnipeg from the time of its construction in 1898. The Auditorium rink hosted several Stanley Cup championship series. It was located at the intersection of Garry Street and York Avenue. It was destroyed by fire in 1926.

Another building, also called the Winnipeg Auditorium (or the Winnipeg Civic Auditorium), was constructed in the early 1930s and located at the corner of Memorial Boulevard and St. Mary Avenue. Its purpose was to hold concerts, display art, hold conventions.

== Sports venue ==
=== Construction ===
By 1898, the sport of ice hockey had become popular as both a participation sport and spectator sport in Winnipeg. Until this time, most ice hockey had been played on the rinks of curling clubs in Winnipeg. The Auditorium was built at a cost of about $20,000. Construction was financed by a group of very prominent businessmen, among them E. L. Drewry, proprietor of the Redwood and Empire Brewery, F. W. Stobart of Stobart and Sons (dry goods), J. H. Ashdown of Ashdown's Hardware, and A. M. Nanton, partner in the financial firm of Osler, Hammond, and Nanton.

The wood structure held an ice surface measuring 200 feet (61 m) by 80 feet (24 m), following the regulation size of the Victoria Rink in Montreal. The Auditorium could seat about 2000 spectators for hockey, plus standing room. Over the years it was renovated and expanded to hold over 3500. The facility also contained a coat check room, a ladies' room and four or five dressing rooms. In the basement, under the ice, were four bowling alleys.

The arena was used primarily for ice hockey but also hosted professional boxing until it was destroyed by fire on March 14, 1926. In 1931, a new "Winnipeg Civic Auditorium" was constructed. This was not a sports venue, but a music and theatre space. The Shea's Amphitheatre, constructed in 1909, seating 5000, served Winnipeg until the construction of the Winnipeg Arena in the 1950s.

The arena was used by the Manitoba Hockey Association, as the home rink of the Winnipeg Victorias, Winnipeg Hockey Club and Winnipeg Rowing Club. The rink was used in 1902 for a Stanley Cup challenge series between the Victorias and the Toronto Wellingtons. In 1907, it was used for the Stanley Cup challenge series between the Kenora Thistles and the Montreal Wanderers.

== Arts venue ==
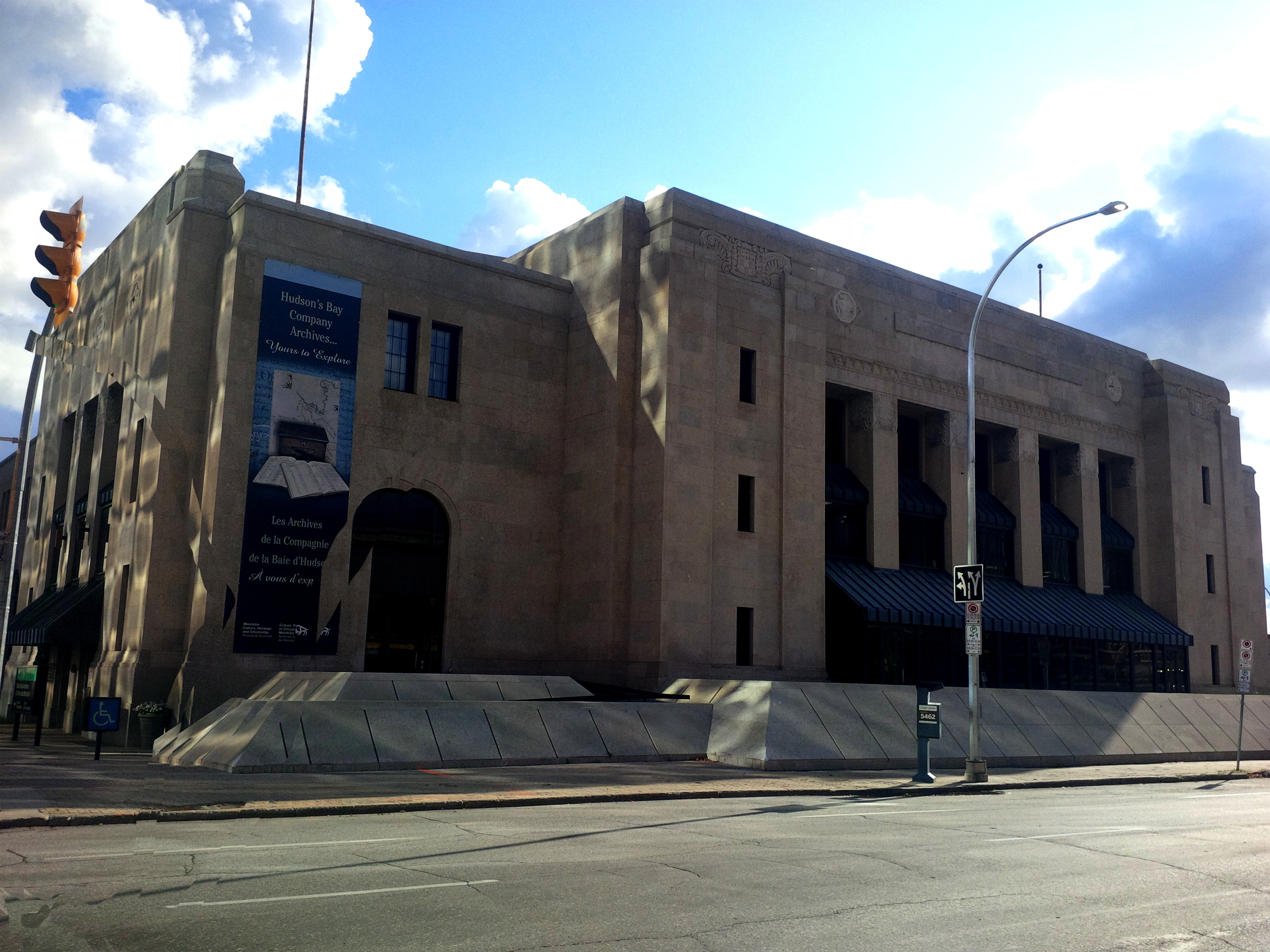
Former Winnipeg Auditorium (1932–1971)

The other Winnipeg Auditorium (also known as the Civic Auditorium) was built in the 1930s. Its purpose was to display the art collections of the Winnipeg Art Gallery and the Manitoba Museum, and perform music from the Winnipeg Symphony Orchestra. It also functioned as a convention centre until the current stand-alone Winnipeg Convention Centre (375 York Ave.) was built in the 1970s. It was constructed in 1932 by Carter-Halls-Aldinger as a make-work project during the Canadian Depression decade and largely paid for with funds from the Canadian federal government.

The Winnipeg Symphony Orchestra moved to the Centennial Concert Hall 1968, with the Manitoba Museum moving in 1970. When the Winnipeg Art Gallery moved across the street to their own building (300 Memorial Blvd.) in 1971 the Winnipeg Auditorium was re-purposed as the provincial Manitoba Archives.

The Winnipeg Auditorium officially opened October 15, 1932, with the Canadian Industrial Exhibition of the North-West Commercial Travellers Association.

== See also ==
- 1901–02 MHA season
- 1906–07 MPHL season
