= List of Stanley Cup champions =

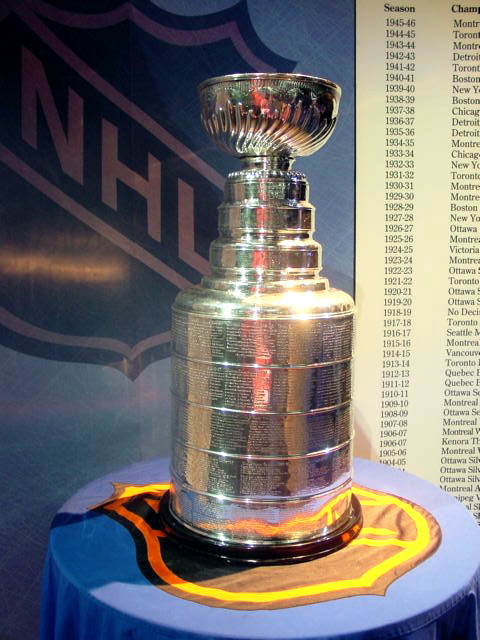
The Stanley Cup

The Stanley Cup is a trophy awarded annually to the playoff champion club of the National Hockey League (NHL). It was donated by the Governor General of Canada Lord Stanley of Preston in 1892, and is the oldest professional sports trophy in North America. Inscribed the Dominion Hockey Challenge Cup, the trophy was first awarded to Canada's amateur ice hockey clubs who won the trophy as the result of challenge games and league play. Professional clubs came to dominate the competition in the early years of the twentieth century, and in 1913 the two major professional ice hockey organizations, the National Hockey Association (NHA), forerunner of the NHL, and the Pacific Coast Hockey Association (PCHA), reached a gentlemen's agreement in which their respective champions would face each other in an annual series for the Stanley Cup. After a series of league mergers and folds, it became the de facto championship trophy of the NHL in 1926, though it was nominally still subject to external challenge. After 1947, the Cup became the de jure NHL championship prize.

From 1915 to the end of the 2024–25 season, the trophy has been won 109 times. 27 teams have won the cup, 22 of which are still active in the NHL. Prior to that, the challenge cup was held by nine teams. The Montreal Canadiens have won the Stanley Cup 24 times and made the Final an additional 11 times. There were two years when the Stanley Cup was not awarded: 1919, because of the Spanish flu pandemic, and 2005, because of the 2004–05 NHL lockout.

The most recent Stanley Cup champions are the Carolina Hurricanes, who won the trophy in 2026.

== Challenge Cup era (1893–1914) ==
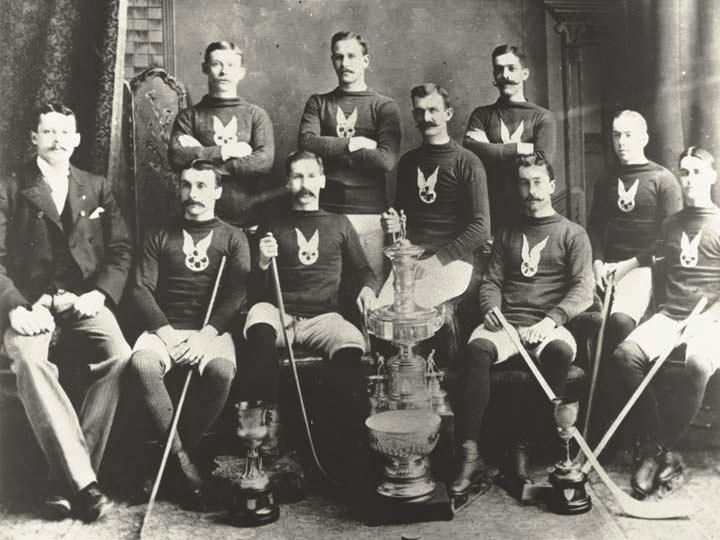
The first Challenge Cup champions: Montreal Hockey Club

The origins of the Challenge era come from the method of play of the Amateur Hockey Association of Canada prior to 1893. From 1887 to 1893, the league did not play a round-robin format, but rather challenges between teams of the association that year, with the winner of the series being the 'interim' champion, with the final challenge winner becoming the league champion for the year. The Stanley Cup kept the tradition going, but added league championships as another way that a team could win the trophy. If a team in the same league as the current champion won the league championship, it would then inherit the Cup, without a challenge. The only time this rule was not followed was in 1904, when the Ottawa Senators club withdrew from its league, the CAHL. The trustees ruled that the Cup stayed with Ottawa, instead of the CAHL league champion.

During the challenge cup period, none of the leagues that played for the trophy had a formal playoff system to decide their respective champions; whichever team finished in first place after the regular season won the league title. A playoff would only be played if teams tied for first-place in their leagues at the end of the regular season. Challenge games were played until 1912 at any time during hockey season by challenges approved or ordered by the Stanley Cup trustees. In 1912, Cup trustees declared that it was only to be defended at the end of the champion team's regular season.

In 1908, the Allan Cup was introduced as the trophy for Canada's amateurs, as the Stanley Cup became a symbol of professional hockey supremacy.

This table lists the outcome of all Stanley Cup wins, including successful victories and defenses in challenges, and league championships for the challenge era.

| Date | Winning team | Coach | Losing team | Playoff format | Score | Winning goal |
|---|---|---|---|---|---|---|
| March 17, 1893 | Montreal Hockey Club (AHAC) | Harry Shaw (manager) | 1893 AHAC champions, no challengers | | | |
| March 22, 1894 | Montreal Hockey Club (AHAC) | Harry Shaw (manager) | Ottawa Hockey Club (AHAC) | Single-elimination (1894 AHAC championship playoff) | 3–1 | Billy Barlow (9:00, third quarter) |
| March 9, 1895 | Montreal Hockey Club (AHAC)^{[A]} | Harry Shaw (manager) | Queen's University (OHA) | Single-elimination | 5–1 | |
| March 9, 1895 | Montreal Victorias (AHAC)^{[A]} | Mike Grant (captain) | 1895 AHAC Champion | | | |
| February 14, 1896 | Winnipeg Victorias (MHA) | Jack Armytage (captain) | Montreal Victorias (AHAC) | Single-elimination | 2–0 | Jack Armytage (10:00, first half) |
| February 29, 1896 | Winnipeg Victorias (MHA) | Jack Armytage (captain) | 1896 MHA champion | | | |
| December 30, 1896 | Montreal Victorias (AHAC) | Mike Grant (captain) | Winnipeg Victorias (MHA) | Single-elimination | 6–5 | Ernie McLea (28:00, second half) |
| March 6, 1897 | Montreal Victorias (AHAC) | Mike Grant (captain) | 1897 AHAC Champion | | | |
| December 27, 1897 | Montreal Victorias (AHAC) | Mike Grant (captain) | Ottawa Capitals (CCHA) | Single-elimination^{[B]} | 15–2 | |
| March 5, 1898 | Montreal Victorias (AHAC) | Frank Richardson-playing | 1898 AHAC Champion | | | |
| February 15–18, 1899 | Montreal Victorias (CAHL) | Frank Richardson-playing | Winnipeg Victorias (MHA) | Two-game total goals | 5–3 | Robert MacDougall (second half) |
| March 4, 1899 | Montreal Shamrocks (CAHL) | Barney Dunphy | 1899 CAHL Champion | | | |
| March 14, 1899 | Montreal Shamrocks (CAHL) | Barney Dunphy | Queen's University (OHA) | Single-elimination | 6–2 | Harry Trihey |
| February 12–15, 1900 | Montreal Shamrocks (CAHL) | Barney Dunphy | Winnipeg Victorias (MHA) | Best-of-three | 2–1 | Harry Trihey (second half) |
| March 7, 1900 | Montreal Shamrocks (CAHL) | Barney Dunphy | Halifax Crescents (MaPHL) | Best-of-three | 2–0 (10–2, 11–0) | |
| March 10, 1900 | Montreal Shamrocks (CAHL) | Barney Dunphy | 1900 CAHL Champion | | | |
| January 29–31, 1901 | Winnipeg Victorias (MHA) | Dan Bain (captain) | Montreal Shamrocks (CAHL) | Best-of-three | 2–0 | Dan Bain (4:00, OT) |
| February 19, 1901 | Winnipeg Victorias (MHA) | Dan Bain (captain) | Winnipeg Hockey Club (MHA) | Single-elimination (1901 MHA championship) | 4–3 | |
| January 21–23, 1902 | Winnipeg Victorias (MHA) | Dan Bain (captain) | Toronto Wellingtons (OHA) | Best-of-three | 2–0 | Fred Scanlan (9:00, second half) |
| March 1902 | Winnipeg Victorias (MHA) | Dan Bain (captain) | 1902 MHA Champion | | | |
| March 13–17, 1902 | Montreal Hockey Club (CAHL) | Clarence McKerrow | Winnipeg Victorias (MHA) | Best-of-three | 2–1 | Jack Marshall (first half) |
| January 29–31, February 2–4, 1903 | Montreal Hockey Club (CAHL) | Desse Browne | Winnipeg Victorias (MHA) | Best-of-three | 2–1^{[C]} | Tom Phillips |
| March 7–10, 1903 | Ottawa Silver Seven (CAHL) | Alf Smith | Montreal Victorias (CAHL) | Two-game total goals (1903 CAHL championship playoff) | 9–1 | Suddy Gilmour (4:34, first half, second game) |
| March 12–14, 1903 | Ottawa Silver Seven (CAHL) | Alf Smith | Rat Portage Thistles (MNWHA) | Two-game total goals | 10–4 | Frank McGee (8:20, first half) |
| December 30, 1903, January 1–4, 1904 | Ottawa Silver Seven (CAHL) | Alf Smith-playing | Winnipeg Rowing Club (MHA) | Best-of-three | 2–1 | Frank McGee (11:00, second half) |
| February 23–25, 1904 | Ottawa Silver Seven^{[D]} | Alf Smith-playing | Toronto Marlboros (OHA) | Best-of-three | 2–0 | Arthur Moore (9:38, first half) |
| March 2, 1904 | Ottawa Silver Seven^{[D]} | Alf Smith-playing | Montreal Wanderers (FAHL) | Two-game total goals | ^{[E]} | |
| March 9–11, 1904 | Ottawa Silver Seven^{[D]} | Alf Smith-playing | Brandon Wheat City (MNWHA) | Best-of-three | 2–0 | Frank McGee (18:00, first half) |
| January 13–16, 1905 | Ottawa Silver Seven (FAHL) | Alf Smith-playing | Dawson City Nuggets | Best-of-three | 2–0 | Harry Westwick (12:15, first half) |
| March 3, 1905 | Ottawa Silver Seven (FAHL) | Alf Smith-playing | 1905 FAHL Champion | | | |
| March 7–9–11, 1905 | Ottawa Silver Seven (FAHL) | Alf Smith-playing | Rat Portage Thistles (MHL) | Best-of-three | 2–1 | Frank McGee |
| February 27–28, 1906 | Ottawa Silver Seven (FAHL) | Alf Smith-playing | Queen's University (OHA) | Best-of-three | 2–0 | Harvey Pulford (10:00, second half) |
| March 6–8, 1906 | Ottawa Silver Seven (FAHL) | Alf Smith-playing | Smiths Falls Hockey Club (FAHL) | Best-of-three | 2–0 | Frank McGee (17:45, first half) |
| March 14–17, 1906 | Montreal Wanderers (ECAHA) | Cecil Blachford-playing | Ottawa Silver Seven (ECAHA) | Two-game total goals (1906 ECAHA championship playoff) | 12–10 | Lester Patrick |
| December 27–29, 1906 | Montreal Wanderers (ECAHA) | Cecil Blachford-playing | New Glasgow Cubs (MaHL) | Two-game total goals | 17–5 | |
| January 21–23, 1907 | Kenora Thistles (MPHL) | James Link | Montreal Wanderers (ECAHA) | Two-game total goals | 12–8 | Roxy Beaudro |
| March 16–18, 1907 | Kenora Thistles (MPHL) | James Link | Brandon Wheat City (MPHL) | Best-of-three (1907 MPHL championship) | 2–0 | Fred Whitcroft (19:00, first half) |
| March 23–25, 1907 | Montreal Wanderers (ECAHA) | Lester Patrick (captain) | Kenora Thistles (MPHL) | Two-game total goals | 12–8 | Ernest "Moose" Johnson |
| January 9–13, 1908 | Montreal Wanderers (ECAHA) | Cecil Blachford (captain) | Ottawa Victorias (FAHL) | Two-game total goals | 22–4 | Frank Glass (25:00, first half, first game) |
| March 7, 1908 | Montreal Wanderers (ECAHA) | Cecil Blachford (captain) | 1908 ECAHA Champions | | | |
| March 10–12, 1908 | Montreal Wanderers (ECAHA) | Cecil Blachford (captain) | Winnipeg Maple Leafs (MPHL) | Two-game total goals | 20–8 | |
| March 14, 1908 | Montreal Wanderers (ECAHA) | Cecil Blachford (captain) | Toronto Pros (OPHL) | Single-elimination | 6–4 | Ernest "Moose" Johnson |
| December 28–30, 1908 | Montreal Wanderers (ECAHA) | Cecil Blachford (captain) | Edmonton HC (AAHA) | Two-game total goals | 13–10 | Walter Smaill (33:45, second half, second game) |
| March 6, 1909 | Ottawa Hockey Club (ECHA) | Pete Green | 1909 ECHA champions | | | |
| January 5–7, 1910 | Ottawa Hockey Club (ECHA) | Pete Green | Galt Hockey Club (OPHL) | Two-game total goals | 15–4 | Hamby Shore (10:10, first half, first game) |
| January 18–20, 1910 | Ottawa Hockey Club (ECHA) | Pete Green | Edmonton HC (AAHA) | Two-game total goals | 21–11 | Bruce Stuart (23:45, first half) |
| March 9, 1910 | Montreal Wanderers (NHA) | Frank Glass (captain) | 1910 NHA Champion | | | |
| March 12, 1910 | Montreal Wanderers (NHA) | Frank Glass (captain) | Berlin Dutchmen (OPHL) | Single-elimination | 7–3 | Harry Hyland (22:00, first half) |
| March 10, 1911 | Ottawa Senators (NHA) | Pete Green | 1911 NHA Champions | | | |
| March 13, 1911 | Ottawa Senators (NHA) | Pete Green | Galt Hockey Club (OPHL) | Single-elimination | 7–4 | Marty Walsh (5:00, third) |
| March 16, 1911 | Ottawa Senators (NHA) | Pete Green | Port Arthur Bearcats (New Ontario Hockey League) | Single-elimination | 13–4 | Marty Walsh (4:30, second) |
| March 5, 1912 | Quebec Bulldogs (NHA) | Charles Nolan | 1912 NHA Champions | | | |
| March 11–13, 1912 | Quebec Bulldogs (NHA) | Charles Nolan | Moncton Victorias (MaPHL) | Best-of-three | 2–0 | Joe Malone (18:00, first) |
| March 5, 1913 | Quebec Bulldogs (NHA) | Joe Malone (captain) | 1913 NHA Champions | | | |
| March 8–10, 1913 | Quebec Bulldogs (NHA) | Joe Malone (captain) | Sydney Millionaires (MaPHL) | Two-game total goals | 20–5 | Tommy Smith (3:10, second, first game) |
| March 7–11, 1914 | Toronto Hockey Club (NHA) | Jack Marshall (playing-manager) | Montreal Canadiens (NHA) | Two-game total goals (1914 NHA championship playoff) | 6–2 | Scotty Davidson (2:00, third, second game) |
| March 14–17–19, 1914 | Toronto Hockey Club (NHA) | Jack Marshall (playing-manager) | Victoria Aristocrats (PCHA) | Best-of-five | 3–0^{[F]} | Harry Cameron (7:00, third) |

Notes

A. Although the Montreal Victorias won the AHAC title in 1895, the Stanley Cup trustees had already accepted a challenge from the 1894 Cup champion Montreal HC and Queen's University. As a compromise, the trustees decided that if the Montreal HC won the challenge match, the Victorias would become the Stanley Cup champions. The Montreals eventually won the game, 5–1, and their crosstown rivals were awarded the Cup.

B. Intended to be a best-of-three series, Ottawa Capitals withdrew their challenge after the first game.

C. The January 31 (a Saturday) game was tied 2–2 at midnight and the Mayor of Westmount refused to allow play to continue on Sunday. The game was played on February 2 (a Monday) and the January 31 game was considered to be void.

D. For most of 1904, the Ottawa Hockey Club was not affiliated with any league.

E. The Montreal Wanderers were disqualified as the result of a dispute. After game one ended tied at the end of regulation, 5–5, the Wanderers refused to play overtime with the current referee, and then subsequently refused to play the next game of the series in Ottawa.

F. During the series, it was revealed that the Victoria club had not filed a formal challenge. A letter arrived from the Stanley Cup trustees on March 17, stating that the trustees would not let the Stanley Cup travel west, as they did not consider Victoria a proper challenger because they had not formally notified the trustees. However, on March 18, Trustee William Foran stated that it was a misunderstanding. PCHA president Frank Patrick had not filed a challenge because he had expected Emmett Quinn, president of the NHA to make all of the arrangements in his role as hockey commissioner, whereas the trustees thought they were being deliberately ignored. In any case, all arrangements had been ironed out and the Victoria challenge was accepted.

Sources

- Coleman (1964)
- Montreal Gazette
- Ottawa Citizen
- Ottawa Journal
- Winnipeg Tribune

== NHA/NHL vs. PCHA/WCHL/WHL champions (1915–1926) ==
Several days after the Victoria Aristocrats – Toronto Hockey Club series, Stanley Cup trustee William Foran wrote to NHA president Emmett Quinn that the trustees are "perfectly satisfied to allow the representatives of the three pro leagues (NHA, PCHA, and Maritime) to make all arrangements each season as to the series of matches to be played for the Cup." The Maritime league did not challenge for the Cup in 1914, and folded after the 1915 season. The Stanley Cup championship finals alternated between the East and the West each year, with games played alternately under NHA or PCHA rules. The Cup trustees agreed to this new arrangement, because after the Allan Cup became the highest prize for amateur hockey teams in Canada, the trustees had become dependent on the top two professional leagues to bolster the prominence of the trophy.

After the New Westminster Royals moved to Portland in the summer of 1914 becoming the Portland Rosebuds, an American-based team, the trustees issued a statement that the Cup was no longer for the best team in Canada, but now for the best team in the world. In March 1916, the Rosebuds became the first American team to play in the Stanley Cup championship final. In 1917, the Seattle Metropolitans became the first American team to win the Cup. After that season, the NHA suspended operations and the National Hockey League (NHL) took its place.

In 1919, the Spanish influenza epidemic forced the Montreal Canadiens and the Seattle Metropolitans to cancel their series tied at 2–2–1, marking the first time the Stanley Cup was not awarded.

The format for the Stanley Cup championship changed in 1922, with the creation of the Western Canada Hockey League (WCHL). Now three leagues competed for the Cup and this necessitated a semi-final series between two league champions, with the third having a bye directly to the final. In 1924, the PCHA folded and only the Vancouver and Victoria teams entered the WCHL. With the loss of the PCHA, the championship reverted to a single series. After their win in 1925, the Victoria Cougars became the last team outside the NHL to win the Stanley Cup. For the 1925–26 season the WCHL was renamed the Western Hockey League (WHL). With the Victoria Cougars' loss in 1926, it would be the last time a non-NHL team competed for the Stanley Cup.

Numbers in parentheses in the table indicate the number of times that team has appeared in the Stanley Cup Final, as well as each respective teams' Stanley Cup Final record to date.

| Year | Winning team | Coach | Games | Losing team | Coach | Winning goal |
|---|---|---|---|---|---|---|
| 1915 | Vancouver Millionaires (PCHA) (1, 1–0) | Frank Patrick-playing | 3–0 | Ottawa Senators (NHA) (1, 0–1) | Frank Shaughnessy (manager) | Barney Stanley (5:30, second) |
| 1916 | Montreal Canadiens (NHA) (1, 1–0) | Newsy Lalonde-playing | 3–2 | Portland Rosebuds (PCHA) (1, 0–1) | Edward Savage (manager) | George Prodgers (17:20, third) |
| 1917 | Seattle Metropolitans (PCHA) (1, 1–0) | Pete Muldoon | 3–1 | Montreal Canadiens (NHA) (2, 1–1) | Newsy Lalonde-playing | Bernie Morris (7:55, first) |
| 1918 | Toronto Hockey Club (NHL) (1, 1–0) | Dick Carroll | 3–2 | Vancouver Millionaires (PCHA) (2, 1–1) | Frank Patrick-playing | Corb Denneny (10:30, third) |
| 1919 | Montreal Canadiens (NHL) vs. Seattle Metropolitans (PCHA) – Series cancelled after the fifth game because of the flu epidemic – Stanley Cup not awarded | | | | | |
| 1920 | Ottawa Senators (NHL) (2, 1–1) | Pete Green | 3–2 | Seattle Metropolitans (PCHA) (3, 1–1) | Pete Muldoon | Jack Darragh (5:00, third) |
| 1921 | Ottawa Senators (NHL) (3, 2–1) | Pete Green | 3–2 | Vancouver Millionaires (PCHA) (3, 1–2) | Frank Patrick-playing | Jack Darragh (9:40, second) |
| 1922 | Toronto St. Patricks (NHL) (2, 2–0) | George O'Donoghue | 3–2 | Vancouver Millionaires (PCHA) (4, 1–3) | Frank Patrick-playing | Babe Dye (4:20, first) |
| 1923 | Ottawa Senators (NHL) (4, 3–1) | Pete Green | 2–0 | Edmonton Eskimos (WCHL) (1, 0–1) | Ken McKenzie | Punch Broadbent (11:23, first) |
| 1924 | Montreal Canadiens (NHL) (4, 2–1) | Leo Dandurand | 2–0 | Calgary Tigers (WCHL) (1, 0–1) | Eddie Oatman-playing | Howie Morenz (4:55, first) |
| 1925 | Victoria Cougars (WCHL) (1, 1–0) | Lester Patrick | 3–1 | Montreal Canadiens (NHL) (5, 2–2) | Leo Dandurand | Gizzy Hart (2:35, second) |
| 1926 | Montreal Maroons (NHL) (1, 1–0) | Eddie Gerard | 3–1 | Victoria Cougars (WHL) (2, 1–1) | Lester Patrick | Nels Stewart (2:50, second) |

== NHL champions (since 1927) ==
When the WHL folded in 1926, its remaining assets were acquired by the NHL, making it the only remaining league with teams competing for the Cup. Other leagues and clubs have issued challenges, but from that year forward no non-NHL team has played for it, leading it to become the de facto championship trophy of the NHL. In 1947, the NHL reached an agreement with trustees P. D. Ross and Cooper Smeaton to grant control of the Cup to the NHL, allowing the league itself to reject challenges from other leagues that may have wished to play for the Cup. A 2006 Ontario Superior Court case found that the trustees had gone against Lord Stanley's conditions in the 1947 agreement. The NHL has agreed to allow other teams to play for the Cup should the league not be operating, as was the case in the 2004–05 NHL lockout.

Since 1927, the league's playoff format, deciding which teams advanced to the Stanley Cup Final, has changed multiple times. In some systems that were previously used, playoff teams were seeded regardless of division or conference. From 1942 to 1967 the Cup was competed for by the league's six teams, also known as the Original Six. For three seasons after the 1967 NHL Expansion, the Final was competed between the East Division champion and the West Division champion. In 1971, the league returned to using playoff systems that allowed cross-over between the divisions and conferences. From 1982 to 2020, the Final was played between the league's conference playoff champions; during that period the Campbell/Western champions went a combined 111–101 in the Final against the Wales/Eastern champions (winning 20 of 38 series). In 2021, the COVID-19 pandemic and the resulting travel restrictions along the Canada–United States border forced the league to temporarily realign the teams into four regional divisions with no conferences, and hold a divisional-based playoff format: the four divisional playoff champions advanced to the Stanley Cup semifinals, and the winners of those series moved on to the Final. The league then returned to the Eastern vs. Western Conference format in 2022.

Numbers in parentheses in the table indicate the number of times that team has appeared in the Stanley Cup Final, as well as each respective team's Stanley Cup Final record to date.

Championships summary

- 1927–1928: American Division vs. Canadian Division
- 1929–1967, 1971–1981, 2021: Teams advanced to the Final regardless of division or conference
- 1968–1970: East Division vs. West Division
- 1982–1993: Campbell Conference vs. Prince of Wales Conference
- 1994–2020, 2022–present: Eastern Conference vs. Western Conference

| Year | Winning team | Coach | Games | Losing team | Coach | Winning goal |
|---|---|---|---|---|---|---|
| 1927 | Ottawa Senators (C) (5, 4–1) | Dave Gill | 2–0 | Boston Bruins (A) (1, 0–1) | Art Ross | Cy Denneny (7:30, second) |
| 1928 | New York Rangers (A) (1, 1–0) | Lester Patrick-playing | 3–2 | Montreal Maroons (C) (2, 1–1) | Eddie Gerard | Frank Boucher (3:35, third) |
| 1929 | Boston Bruins (A) (2, 1–1) | Art Ross | 2–0 | New York Rangers (A) (2, 1–1) | Lester Patrick | Bill Carson (18:02, third) |
| 1930 | Montreal Canadiens (C) (6, 3–2) | Cecil Hart | 2–0 | Boston Bruins (A) (3, 1–2) | Art Ross | Howie Morenz (1:00, second) |
| 1931 | Montreal Canadiens (C) (7, 4–2) | Cecil Hart | 3–2 | Chicago Black Hawks (A) (1, 0–1) | Dick Irvin | Johnny Gagnon (9:59, second) |
| 1932 | Toronto Maple Leafs (C) (3, 3–0) | Dick Irvin | 3–0 | New York Rangers (A) (3, 1–2) | Lester Patrick | Ace Bailey (15:07, third) |
| 1933 | New York Rangers (A) (4, 2–2) | Lester Patrick | 3–1 | Toronto Maple Leafs (C) (4, 3–1) | Dick Irvin | Bill Cook (7:34, OT) |
| 1934 | Chicago Black Hawks (A) (2, 1–1) | Tommy Gorman | 3–1 | Detroit Red Wings (A) (1, 0–1) | Jack Adams | Mush March (10:05, second OT) |
| 1935 | Montreal Maroons (C) (3, 2–1) | Tommy Gorman | 3–0 | Toronto Maple Leafs (C) (5, 3–2) | Dick Irvin | Baldy Northcott (16:18, second) |
| 1936 | Detroit Red Wings (A) (2, 1–1) | Jack Adams | 3–1 | Toronto Maple Leafs (C) (6, 3–3) | Dick Irvin | Pete Kelly (9:45, third) |
| 1937 | Detroit Red Wings (A) (3, 2–1) | Jack Adams | 3–2 | New York Rangers (A) (5, 2–3) | Lester Patrick | Marty Barry (19:22, first) |
| 1938 | Chicago Black Hawks (A) (3, 2–1) | Bill Stewart | 3–1 | Toronto Maple Leafs (C) (7, 3–4) | Dick Irvin | Carl Voss (16:45, second) |
| 1939 | Boston Bruins (4, 2–2) | Art Ross | 4–1 | Toronto Maple Leafs (8, 3–5) | Dick Irvin | Roy Conacher (17:54, second) |
| 1940 | New York Rangers (6, 3–3) | Frank Boucher | 4–2 | Toronto Maple Leafs (9, 3–6) | Dick Irvin | Bryan Hextall (2:07, OT) |
| 1941 | Boston Bruins (5, 3–2) | Cooney Weiland | 4–0 | Detroit Red Wings (4, 2–2) | Jack Adams | Bobby Bauer (8:43, second) |
| 1942 | Toronto Maple Leafs (10, 4–6) | Hap Day | 4–3 | Detroit Red Wings (5, 2–3) | Jack Adams | Pete Langelle (9:48, third) |
| 1943 | Detroit Red Wings (6, 3–3) | Jack Adams | 4–0 | Boston Bruins (6, 3–3) | Art Ross | Joe Carveth (12:09, first) |
| 1944 | Montreal Canadiens (8, 5–2) | Dick Irvin | 4–0 | Chicago Black Hawks (4, 2–2) | Paul Thompson | Toe Blake (9:12, OT) |
| 1945 | Toronto Maple Leafs (11, 5–6) | Hap Day | 4–3 | Detroit Red Wings (7, 3–4) | Jack Adams | Babe Pratt (12:14, third) |
| 1946 | Montreal Canadiens (9, 6–2) | Dick Irvin | 4–1 | Boston Bruins (7, 3–4) | Dit Clapper | Toe Blake (11:06, third) |
| 1947 | Toronto Maple Leafs (12, 6–6) | Hap Day | 4–2 | Montreal Canadiens (10, 6–3) | Dick Irvin | Ted Kennedy (14:39, third) |
| 1948 | Toronto Maple Leafs (13, 7–6) | Hap Day | 4–0 | Detroit Red Wings (8, 3–5) | Tommy Ivan | Harry Watson (11:13, first) |
| 1949 | Toronto Maple Leafs (14, 8–6) | Hap Day | 4–0 | Detroit Red Wings (9, 3–6) | Tommy Ivan | Cal Gardner (19:45, second) |
| 1950 | Detroit Red Wings (10, 4–6) | Tommy Ivan | 4–3 | New York Rangers (7, 3–4) | Lynn Patrick | Pete Babando (8:31, second OT) |
| 1951 | Toronto Maple Leafs (15, 9–6) | Joe Primeau | 4–1 | Montreal Canadiens (11, 6–4) | Dick Irvin | Bill Barilko (2:53, OT) |
| 1952 | Detroit Red Wings (11, 5–6) | Tommy Ivan | 4–0 | Montreal Canadiens (12, 6–5) | Dick Irvin | Metro Prystai (6:50, first) |
| 1953 | Montreal Canadiens (13, 7–5) | Dick Irvin | 4–1 | Boston Bruins (8, 3–5) | Lynn Patrick | Elmer Lach (1:22, OT) |
| 1954 | Detroit Red Wings (12, 6–6) | Tommy Ivan | 4–3 | Montreal Canadiens (14, 7–6) | Dick Irvin | Tony Leswick (4:20, OT) |
| 1955 | Detroit Red Wings (13, 7–6) | Jimmy Skinner | 4–3 | Montreal Canadiens (15, 7–7) | Dick Irvin | Gordie Howe (19:49, second) |
| 1956 | Montreal Canadiens (16, 8–7) | Toe Blake | 4–1 | Detroit Red Wings (14, 7–7) | Jimmy Skinner | Maurice Richard (15:08, second) |
| 1957 | Montreal Canadiens (17, 9–7) | Toe Blake | 4–1 | Boston Bruins (9, 3–6) | Milt Schmidt | Dickie Moore (0:14, second) |
| 1958 | Montreal Canadiens (18, 10–7) | Toe Blake | 4–2 | Boston Bruins (10, 3–7) | Milt Schmidt | Bernie Geoffrion (19:26, second) |
| 1959 | Montreal Canadiens (19, 11–7) | Toe Blake | 4–1 | Toronto Maple Leafs (16, 9–7) | Punch Imlach | Marcel Bonin (9:55, second) |
| 1960 | Montreal Canadiens (20, 12–7) | Toe Blake | 4–0 | Toronto Maple Leafs (17, 9–8) | Punch Imlach | Jean Béliveau (8:16, first) |
| 1961 | Chicago Black Hawks (5, 3–2) | Rudy Pilous | 4–2 | Detroit Red Wings (15, 7–8) | Sid Abel | Ab McDonald (18:49, second) |
| 1962 | Toronto Maple Leafs (18, 10–8) | Punch Imlach | 4–2 | Chicago Black Hawks (6, 3–3) | Rudy Pilous | Dick Duff (14:14, third) |
| 1963 | Toronto Maple Leafs (19, 11–8) | Punch Imlach | 4–1 | Detroit Red Wings (16, 7–9) | Sid Abel | Eddie Shack (13:28, third) |
| 1964 | Toronto Maple Leafs (20, 12–8) | Punch Imlach | 4–3 | Detroit Red Wings (17, 7–10) | Sid Abel | Andy Bathgate (3:04, first) |
| 1965 | Montreal Canadiens (21, 13–7) | Toe Blake | 4–3 | Chicago Black Hawks (7, 3–4) | Billy Reay | Jean Béliveau (0:14, first) |
| 1966 | Montreal Canadiens (22, 14–7) | Toe Blake | 4–2 | Detroit Red Wings (18, 7–11) | Sid Abel | Henri Richard (2:20, OT) |
| 1967 | Toronto Maple Leafs (21, 13–8) | Punch Imlach | 4–2 | Montreal Canadiens (23, 14–8) | Toe Blake | Jim Pappin (19:24, second) |
| 1968 | Montreal Canadiens (E) (24, 15–8) | Toe Blake | 4–0 | St. Louis Blues (W) (1, 0–1) | Scotty Bowman | J. C. Tremblay (11:40, third) |
| 1969 | Montreal Canadiens (E) (25, 16–8) | Claude Ruel | 4–0 | St. Louis Blues (W) (2, 0–2) | Scotty Bowman | John Ferguson (3:02, third) |
| 1970 | Boston Bruins (E) (11, 4–7) | Harry Sinden | 4–0 | St. Louis Blues (W) (3, 0–3) | Scotty Bowman | Bobby Orr (0:40, OT) |
| 1971 | Montreal Canadiens (E) (26, 17–8) | Al MacNeil | 4–3 | Chicago Black Hawks (W) (8, 3–5) | Billy Reay | Henri Richard (2:34, third) |
| 1972 | Boston Bruins (E) (12, 5–7) | Tom Johnson | 4–2 | New York Rangers (E) (8, 3–5) | Emile Francis | Bobby Orr (11:18, first) |
| 1973 | Montreal Canadiens (E) (27, 18–8) | Scotty Bowman | 4–2 | Chicago Black Hawks (W) (9, 3–6) | Billy Reay | Yvan Cournoyer (8:13, third) |
| 1974 | Philadelphia Flyers (W) (1, 1–0) | Fred Shero | 4–2 | Boston Bruins (E) (13, 5–8) | Bep Guidolin | Rick MacLeish (14:48, first) |
| 1975 | Philadelphia Flyers (CC) (2, 2–0) | Fred Shero | 4–2 | Buffalo Sabres (PW) (1, 0–1) | Floyd Smith | Bob Kelly (0:11, third) |
| 1976 | Montreal Canadiens (PW) (28, 19–8) | Scotty Bowman | 4–0 | Philadelphia Flyers (CC) (3, 2–1) | Fred Shero | Guy Lafleur (14:18, third) |
| 1977 | Montreal Canadiens (PW) (29, 20–8) | Scotty Bowman | 4–0 | Boston Bruins (PW) (14, 5–9) | Don Cherry | Jacques Lemaire (4:32, OT) |
| 1978 | Montreal Canadiens (PW) (30, 21–8) | Scotty Bowman | 4–2 | Boston Bruins (PW) (15, 5–10) | Don Cherry | Mario Tremblay (9:20, first) |
| 1979 | Montreal Canadiens (PW) (31, 22–8) | Scotty Bowman | 4–1 | New York Rangers (CC) (9, 3–6) | Fred Shero | Jacques Lemaire (1:02, second) |
| 1980 | New York Islanders (CC) (1, 1–0) | Al Arbour | 4–2 | Philadelphia Flyers (CC) (4, 2–2) | Pat Quinn | Bob Nystrom (7:11, OT) |
| 1981 | New York Islanders (CC) (2, 2–0) | Al Arbour | 4–1 | Minnesota North Stars (PW) (1, 0–1) | Glen Sonmor | Wayne Merrick (5:37, first) |
| 1982 | New York Islanders (PW) (3, 3–0) | Al Arbour | 4–0 | Vancouver Canucks (CC) (1, 0–1) | Roger Neilson | Mike Bossy (5:00, second) |
| 1983 | New York Islanders (PW) (4, 4–0) | Al Arbour | 4–0 | Edmonton Oilers (CC) (1, 0–1) | Glen Sather | Mike Bossy (12:39, first) |
| 1984 | Edmonton Oilers (CC) (2, 1–1) | Glen Sather | 4–1 | New York Islanders (PW) (5, 4–1) | Al Arbour | Ken Linseman (0:38, second) |
| 1985 | Edmonton Oilers (CC) (3, 2–1) | Glen Sather | 4–1 | Philadelphia Flyers (PW) (5, 2–3) | Mike Keenan | Paul Coffey (17:57, first) |
| 1986 | Montreal Canadiens (PW) (32, 23–8) | Jean Perron | 4–1 | Calgary Flames (CC) (1, 0–1) | Bob Johnson | Bobby Smith (10:30, third) |
| 1987 | Edmonton Oilers (CC) (4, 3–1) | Glen Sather | 4–3 | Philadelphia Flyers (PW) (6, 2–4) | Mike Keenan | Jari Kurri (14:59, second) |
| 1988 | Edmonton Oilers (CC) (5, 4–1) | Glen Sather | 4–0 | Boston Bruins (PW) (16, 5–11) | Terry O'Reilly | Wayne Gretzky (9:44, second) |
| 1989 | Calgary Flames (CC) (2, 1–1) | Terry Crisp | 4–2 | Montreal Canadiens (PW) (33, 23–9) | Pat Burns | Doug Gilmour (11:02, third) |
| 1990 | Edmonton Oilers (CC) (6, 5–1) | John Muckler | 4–1 | Boston Bruins (PW) (17, 5–12) | Mike Milbury | Craig Simpson (9:31, second) |
| 1991 | Pittsburgh Penguins (PW) (1, 1–0) | Bob Johnson | 4–2 | Minnesota North Stars (CC) (2, 0–2) | Bob Gainey | Ulf Samuelsson (2:00, first) |
| 1992 | Pittsburgh Penguins (PW) (2, 2–0) | Scotty Bowman | 4–0 | Chicago Blackhawks (CC) (10, 3–7) | Mike Keenan | Ron Francis (7:59, third) |
| 1993 | Montreal Canadiens (PW) (34, 24–9) | Jacques Demers | 4–1 | Los Angeles Kings (CC) (1, 0–1) | Barry Melrose | Kirk Muller (3:51, second) |
| 1994 | New York Rangers (EC) (10, 4–6) | Mike Keenan | 4–3 | Vancouver Canucks (WC) (2, 0–2) | Pat Quinn | Mark Messier (13:29, second) |
| 1995 | New Jersey Devils (EC) (1, 1–0) | Jacques Lemaire | 4–0 | Detroit Red Wings (WC) (19, 7–12) | Scotty Bowman | Neal Broten (7:56, second) |
| 1996 | Colorado Avalanche (WC) (1, 1–0) | Marc Crawford | 4–0 | Florida Panthers (EC) (1, 0–1) | Doug MacLean | Uwe Krupp (4:31, third OT) |
| 1997 | Detroit Red Wings (WC) (20, 8–12) | Scotty Bowman | 4–0 | Philadelphia Flyers (EC) (7, 2–5) | Terry Murray | Darren McCarty (13:02, second) |
| 1998 | Detroit Red Wings (WC) (21, 9–12) | Scotty Bowman | 4–0 | Washington Capitals (EC) (1, 0–1) | Ron Wilson | Martin Lapointe (2:26, second) |
| 1999 | Dallas Stars (WC) (3, 1–2) | Ken Hitchcock | 4–2 | Buffalo Sabres (EC) (2, 0–2) | Lindy Ruff | Brett Hull (14:51, third OT) |
| 2000 | New Jersey Devils (EC) (2, 2–0) | Larry Robinson (interim) | 4–2 | Dallas Stars (WC) (4, 1–3) | Ken Hitchcock | Jason Arnott (8:20, second OT) |
| 2001 | Colorado Avalanche (WC) (2, 2–0) | Bob Hartley | 4–3 | New Jersey Devils (EC) (3, 2–1) | Larry Robinson | Alex Tanguay (4:57, second) |
| 2002 | Detroit Red Wings (WC) (22, 10–12) | Scotty Bowman | 4–1 | Carolina Hurricanes (EC) (1, 0–1) | Paul Maurice | Brendan Shanahan (14:04, second) |
| 2003 | New Jersey Devils (EC) (4, 3–1) | Pat Burns | 4–3 | Mighty Ducks of Anaheim (WC) (1, 0–1) | Mike Babcock | Michael Rupp (2:22, second) |
| 2004 | Tampa Bay Lightning (EC) (1, 1–0) | John Tortorella | 4–3 | Calgary Flames (WC) (3, 1–2) | Darryl Sutter | Ruslan Fedotenko (14:38, second) |
| 2005 | Season cancelled due to the 2004–05 NHL lockout | | | | | |
| 2006 | Carolina Hurricanes (EC) (2, 1–1) | Peter Laviolette | 4–3 | Edmonton Oilers (WC) (7, 5–2) | Craig MacTavish | František Kaberle (4:18, second) |
| 2007 | Anaheim Ducks (WC) (2, 1–1) | Randy Carlyle | 4–1 | Ottawa Senators (EC) (1, 0–1) | Bryan Murray | Travis Moen (15:44, second) |
| 2008 | Detroit Red Wings (WC) (23, 11–12) | Mike Babcock | 4–2 | Pittsburgh Penguins (EC) (3, 2–1) | Michel Therrien | Henrik Zetterberg (7:36, third) |
| 2009 | Pittsburgh Penguins (EC) (4, 3–1) | Dan Bylsma | 4–3 | Detroit Red Wings (WC) (24, 11–13) | Mike Babcock | Maxime Talbot (10:07, second) |
| 2010 | Chicago Blackhawks (WC) (11, 4–7) | Joel Quenneville | 4–2 | Philadelphia Flyers (EC) (8, 2–6) | Peter Laviolette | Patrick Kane (4:06, OT) |
| 2011 | Boston Bruins (EC) (18, 6–12) | Claude Julien | 4–3 | Vancouver Canucks (WC) (3, 0–3) | Alain Vigneault | Patrice Bergeron (14:37, first) |
| 2012 | Los Angeles Kings (WC) (2, 1–1) | Darryl Sutter | 4–2 | New Jersey Devils (EC) (5, 3–2) | Peter DeBoer | Jeff Carter (12:45, first) |
| 2013 | Chicago Blackhawks (WC) (12, 5–7) | Joel Quenneville | 4–2 | Boston Bruins (EC) (19, 6–13) | Claude Julien | Dave Bolland (19:01, third) |
| 2014 | Los Angeles Kings (WC) (3, 2–1) | Darryl Sutter | 4–1 | New York Rangers (EC) (11, 4–7) | Alain Vigneault | Alec Martinez (14:43, second OT) |
| 2015 | Chicago Blackhawks (WC) (13, 6–7) | Joel Quenneville | 4–2 | Tampa Bay Lightning (EC) (2, 1–1) | Jon Cooper | Duncan Keith (17:13, second) |
| 2016 | Pittsburgh Penguins (EC) (5, 4–1) | Mike Sullivan | 4–2 | San Jose Sharks (WC) (1, 0–1) | Peter DeBoer | Kris Letang (7:46, second) |
| 2017 | Pittsburgh Penguins (EC) (6, 5–1) | Mike Sullivan | 4–2 | Nashville Predators (WC) (1, 0–1) | Peter Laviolette | Patric Hörnqvist (18:25, third) |
| 2018 | Washington Capitals (EC) (2, 1–1) | Barry Trotz | 4–1 | Vegas Golden Knights (WC) (1, 0–1) | Gerard Gallant | Lars Eller (12:23, third) |
| 2019 | St. Louis Blues (WC) (4, 1–3) | Craig Berube (interim) | 4–3 | Boston Bruins (EC) (20, 6–14) | Bruce Cassidy | Alex Pietrangelo (19:52, first) |
| 2020 | Tampa Bay Lightning (EC) (3, 2–1) | Jon Cooper | 4–2 | Dallas Stars (WC) (5, 1–4) | Rick Bowness (interim) | Brayden Point (12:23, first) |
| 2021 | Tampa Bay Lightning (4, 3–1) | Jon Cooper | 4–1 | Montreal Canadiens (35, 24–10) | Dominique Ducharme (interim) | Ross Colton (13:27, second) |
| 2022 | Colorado Avalanche (WC) (3, 3–0) | Jared Bednar | 4–2 | Tampa Bay Lightning (EC) (5, 3–2) | Jon Cooper | Artturi Lehkonen (12:28, second) |
| 2023 | Vegas Golden Knights (WC) (2, 1–1) | Bruce Cassidy | 4–1 | Florida Panthers (EC) (2, 0–2) | Paul Maurice | Reilly Smith (12:13, second) |
| 2024 | Florida Panthers (EC) (3, 1–2) | Paul Maurice | 4–3 | Edmonton Oilers (WC) (8, 5–3) | Kris Knoblauch | Sam Reinhart (15:11, second) |
| 2025 | Florida Panthers (EC) (4, 2–2) | Paul Maurice | 4–2 | Edmonton Oilers (WC) (9, 5–4) | Kris Knoblauch | Matthew Tkachuk (19:13, first) |
| 2026 | Carolina Hurricanes (EC) (3, 2–1) | Rod Brind'Amour | 4–2 | Vegas Golden Knights (WC) (3, 1–2) | John Tortorella | Taylor Hall (3:47, first) |

== Appearances ==
=== Challenge Cup era (1893–1914) ===
Legend: SC = successful Stanley Cup challenge or defense of championship (win); UC = unsuccessful Stanley Cup challenge or defense of championship (loss); Years in bold denote a Stanley Cup win. Numbers in brackets beside years indicate the team appeared multiple times in a challenge or a defense of a championship in that year.

| Apps | Team | SC | UC | Win % | Appearances by year |
|---|---|---|---|---|---|
| 19 | Ottawa HC | 17 | 2 | .895 | 1894, **1903** (2), **1904** (4), **1905** (3), **1906** (2), 1906, **1909**, **1910** (2), **1911** (3) |
| 12 | Montreal Wanderers | 10 | 2 | .833 | 1904, **1906** (2), 1907, **1907**, **1908** (5), **1910** (2) |
| 11 | Winnipeg Victorias | 6 | 5 | .545 | **1896** (2), 1896, 1899, 1900, **1901** (2), **1902** (2), 1902, 1903 |
| 8 | Montreal Victorias | 6 | 2 | .750 | **1895**, 1896, **1896**, **1897** (2), **1898**, **1899**, 1903 |
| 6 | Montreal Shamrocks | 5 | 1 | .833 | **1899** (2), **1900** (3), 1901 |
| 5 | Montreal HC | 5 | 0 | 1.000 | **1893**, **1894**, 1895, **1902**, **1903** |
| 5 | Rat Portage/Kenora Thistles | 2 | 3 | .400 | 1903, 1905, **1907** (2), 1907 |
| 4 | Quebec Bulldogs | 4 | 0 | 1.000 | **1912** (2), **1913** (2) |
| 3 | Queen's University | 0 | 3 | .000 | 1895, 1899, 1906 |
| 2 | Toronto Blueshirts | 2 | 0 | 1.000 | **1914** (2) |
| 2 | Brandon Wheat City | 0 | 2 | .000 | 1904, 1907 |
| 2 | Edmonton HC | 0 | 2 | .000 | 1908, 1910 |
| 2 | Galt HC | 0 | 2 | .000 | 1910, 1911 |
| 2 | Winnipeg Maple Leafs | 0 | 2 | .000 | 1901, 1908 |

The following 16 teams unsuccessfully challenged for a Stanley Cup only once: Berlin Dutchmen (1910), Dawson City Nuggets (1905), Halifax Crescents (1900), Moncton Victorias (1912), Montreal Canadiens (1914), New Glasgow Cubs (1906), Ottawa Capitals (1897), Ottawa Victorias (1908), Port Arthur Bearcats (1911), Smiths Falls (1906), Sydney Millionaires (1913), Toronto Marlboros (1904), Toronto Professionals (1908), Toronto Wellingtons (1902), Victoria Aristocrats (1914), Winnipeg Rowing Club (1904).

=== Stanley Cup Final era (since 1915) ===
==== Active teams ====
In the sortable table below, teams are ordered first by number of appearances, then by number of wins, and finally by alphabetical order. In the "Season(s)" column, bold years indicate winning Stanley Cup Final appearances. Unless marked otherwise, teams played in the NHL exclusively at the time they competed for the Stanley Cup.

| Apps | Team | Wins | Losses | Win % | Season(s) |
|---|---|---|---|---|---|
| 35^{[a]} | Montreal Canadiens | 24 | 10^{[a]} | .706 | **1916**, 1917, 1919^{[a]}, **1924**, 1925, **1930**, **1931**, **1944**, **1946**, 1947, 1951, 1952, **1953**, 1954, 1955, **1956**, **1957**, **1958**, **1959**, **1960**, **1965**, **1966**, 1967, **1968**, **1969**, **1971**, **1973**, **1976**, **1977**, **1978**, **1979**, **1986**, 1989, **1993**, 2021 |
| 24 | Detroit Red Wings | 11 | 13 | .458 | 1934, **1936**, **1937**, 1941, 1942, **1943**, 1945, 1948, 1949, **1950**, **1952**, **1954**, **1955**, 1956, 1961, 1963, 1964, 1966, 1995, **1997**, **1998**, **2002**, **2008**, 2009 |
| 21 | Toronto Maple Leafs^{[b]} | 13 | 8 | .619 | **1918**, **1922**, **1932**, 1933, 1935, 1936, 1938, 1939, 1940, **1942**, **1945**, **1947**, **1948**, **1949**, **1951**, 1959, 1960, **1962**, **1963**, **1964**, **1967** |
| 20 | Boston Bruins | 6 | 14 | .300 | 1927, **1929**, 1930, **1939**, **1941**, 1943, 1946, 1953, 1957, 1958, **1970**, **1972**, 1974, 1977, 1978, 1988, 1990, **2011**, 2013, 2019 |
| 13 | Chicago Blackhawks^{[c]} | 6 | 7 | .462 | 1931, **1934**, **1938**, 1944, **1961**, 1962, 1965, 1971, 1973, 1992, **2010**, **2013**, **2015** |
| 11 | New York Rangers | 4 | 7 | .364 | **1928**, 1929, 1932, **1933**, 1937, **1940**, 1950, 1972, 1979, **1994**, 2014 |
| 9 | Edmonton Oilers | 5 | 4 | .556 | 1983, **1984**, **1985**, **1987**, **1988**, **1990**, 2006, 2024, 2025 |
| 8 | Philadelphia Flyers | 2 | 6 | .250 | **1974**, **1975**, 1976, 1980, 1985, 1987, 1997, 2010 |
| 6 | Pittsburgh Penguins | 5 | 1 | .833 | **1991**, **1992**, 2008, **2009**, **2016**, **2017** |
| 5 | New York Islanders | 4 | 1 | .800 | **1980**, **1981**, **1982**, **1983**, 1984 |
| 5 | New Jersey Devils | 3 | 2 | .600 | **1995**, **2000**, 2001, **2003**, 2012 |
| 5 | Tampa Bay Lightning | 3 | 2 | .600 | **2004**, 2015, **2020**, **2021**, 2022 |
| 5 | Dallas Stars^{[d]} | 1 | 4 | .200 | 1981, 1991, **1999**, 2000, 2020 |
| 4 | Florida Panthers | 2 | 2 | .500 | 1996, 2023, **2024**, **2025** |
| 4 | St. Louis Blues | 1 | 3 | .250 | 1968, 1969, 1970, **2019** |
| 3 | Colorado Avalanche | 3 | 0 | 1.000 | **1996**, **2001**, **2022** |
| 3 | Los Angeles Kings | 2 | 1 | .667 | 1993, **2012**, **2014** |
| 3 | Carolina Hurricanes | 2 | 1 | .667 | 2002, **2006**, **2026** |
| 3 | Calgary Flames | 1 | 2 | .333 | 1986, **1989**, 2004 |
| 3 | Vegas Golden Knights | 1 | 2 | .333 | 2018, **2023**, 2026 |
| 3 | Vancouver Canucks | 0 | 3 | .000 | 1982, 1994, 2011 |
| 2 | Anaheim Ducks^{[e]} | 1 | 1 | .500 | 2003, **2007** |
| 2 | Washington Capitals | 1 | 1 | .500 | 1998, **2018** |
| 2 | Buffalo Sabres | 0 | 2 | .000 | 1975, 1999 |
| 1 | Nashville Predators | 0 | 1 | .000 | 2017 |
| 1 | Ottawa Senators^{[f]} | 0 | 1 | .000 | 2007 |
| 1 | San Jose Sharks | 0 | 1 | .000 | 2016 |

Five active teams have yet to make a Stanley Cup Final appearance:

- Columbus Blue Jackets (25 seasons, 6 playoffs)
- Minnesota Wild (25 seasons, 15 playoffs, 1 division title)
- Seattle Kraken (5 seasons, 1 playoff)
- Utah Mammoth (2 seasons, 1 playoff)
- Winnipeg Jets (15 seasons, 8 playoffs, 1 division title) – formerly Atlanta Thrashers (11 seasons, 1 playoff, 1 division title)

Five relocated teams have won the Stanley Cup in their current location, but never in their former location:

- Quebec Nordiques (16 seasons, 9 playoffs, 2 division titles) – won the Stanley Cup three times as Colorado Avalanche
- Kansas City Scouts (2 seasons, never made playoffs)/Colorado Rockies (6 seasons, 1 playoff) – won the Stanley Cup three times as New Jersey Devils
- California Golden Seals (9 seasons, 2 playoffs)/Cleveland Barons (2 seasons, never made playoffs) – merged with Minnesota North Stars, who lost twice in the Final, then won the Stanley Cup once as Dallas Stars
- Atlanta Flames (8 seasons, 6 playoffs) – won the Stanley Cup once as Calgary Flames
- Hartford Whalers (18 seasons, 8 playoffs, 1 division title) – won the Stanley Cup twice as Carolina Hurricanes

==== Defunct teams ====
Listed after the team name is the name of the affiliated league(s) when the team competed for the Stanley Cup. A bold year denotes a Stanley Cup win.

| Apps | Team | Wins | Losses | Win % | Season(s) |
|---|---|---|---|---|---|
| 5 | Ottawa Senators (NHA/NHL) | 4 | 1 | .800 | 1915, **1920**, **1921**, **1923**, **1927** |
| 4 | Vancouver Millionaires (PCHA/WCHL) | 1 | 3 | .250 | **1915**, 1918, 1921, 1922 |
| 3 | Montreal Maroons (NHL) | 2 | 1 | .667 | **1926**, 1928, **1935** |
| 3^{[a]} | Seattle Metropolitans (PCHA) | 1 | 1^{[a]} | .500 | **1917**, 1919^{[a]}, 1920 |
| 2 | Victoria Cougars (WCHL/WHL) | 1 | 1 | .500 | **1925**, 1926 |
| 1 | Portland Rosebuds (PCHA) | 0 | 1 | .000 | 1916 |
| 1 | Edmonton Eskimos (WCHL) | 0 | 1 | .000 | 1923 |
| 1 | Calgary Tigers (WCHL) | 0 | 1 | .000 | 1924 |

Notes

- **^{a}** The Montreal Canadiens and the Seattle Metropolitans appearance totals include the 1919 Stanley Cup Final that ended with a no-decision because of the Spanish flu epidemic. It is not considered an official series win or loss by either team.
- **^{b}** The franchise known today as the Toronto Maple Leafs won the Cup in 1918 as the Toronto Hockey Club (later engraved on the Stanley Cup as the Toronto Arenas in 1947), and in 1922 as the Toronto St. Patricks.
- **^{c}** The Chicago Blackhawks were known as the Chicago Black Hawks prior to the 1986–87 season.
- **^{d}** The Dallas Stars totals include two series losses as the Minnesota North Stars.
- **^{e}** The Anaheim Ducks totals include one series loss as the Mighty Ducks of Anaheim.
- **^{f}** The Ottawa Senators (1992–present) are named after the original Senators (1883–1934).

== See also ==
- Stanley Cup ring
- NHL conference finals
- List of NHL franchise post-season droughts
- List of NHL franchise post-season appearance streaks
