= Toronto Wellingtons =

Canadian amateur ice hockey team

- Sport: Ice hockey
- Founded: 1899
- Folded: 1903
- League: OHA
- Location: Toronto, Ontario, Canada
- League titles: 3

The Toronto Wellingtons were one of the first amateur men's ice hockey teams in Toronto, Ontario, Canada. They were active around 1900, and are notable for challenging for the Stanley Cup as Ontario Hockey Association (OHA) senior champions of 1901.

== Seasons ==
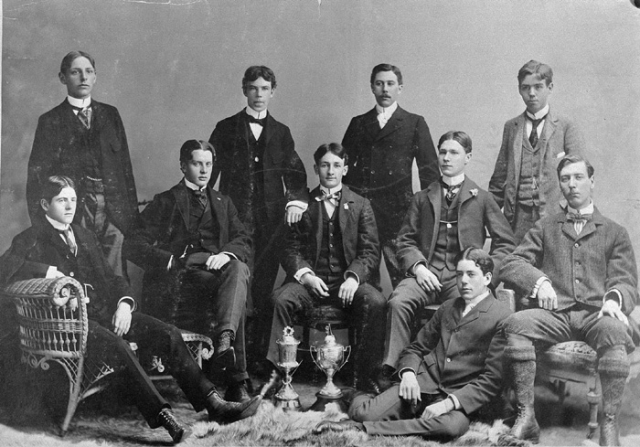
Toronto Wellingtons in 1897

The Wellingtons were organized in 1895 under the jurisdiction of the Ontario Hockey Association (OHA). The club fielded a junior ice hockey team from 1895–1898. The club fielded a team in the intermediate level from 1896–1934. It fielded teams at the senior ice hockey level of the OHA from 1899 to 1903. The senior teams were the J. Ross Robertson Cup champions from 1900 to 1903. Journalist W. A. Hewitt served as the team's representative at meetings of the OHA.

== Stanley Cup challenge ==
As 1901 champions of the Ontario Hockey Association, the Wellingtons were eligible to challenge for the Stanley Cup. In January 1902, the Wellingtons travelled to Winnipeg, Manitoba to play the Winnipeg Victorias for the Stanley Cup.

Date	Winning Team	Score	Losing Team	Location
January 21, 1902	Winnipeg Victorias	5–3	Toronto Wellingtons	Winnipeg Auditorium
January 23, 1902	Winnipeg Victorias	5–3	Toronto Wellingtons	Winnipeg Auditorium
Winnipeg wins best-of-three series 2 games to 0

== See also ==
- List of Stanley Cup champions
