= Manitoba Hockey Association =

Amateur ice hockey league in Manitoba, Canada

- Sport: Ice hockey
- Founded: 1892
- First season: 1893
- Folded: 1923
- Country: Canada
- Last champion: Brandon Wheat City Hockey Club
- Most titles: Winnipeg Victorias

The Manitoba Hockey Association (MHA) was an early men's senior ice hockey league playing around 1900 in Manitoba, Canada. The league started as an elite amateur league in 1892, became professional in 1905, had a professional and an amateur league in 1908–09 and only an amateur league from 1909 until 1923. Two teams from the league won the Stanley Cup, the Winnipeg Victorias and the Kenora Thistles. Three other teams from the league challenged for the Stanley Cup: Brandon Wheat City, Winnipeg Maple Leafs, and the Winnipeg Rowing Club. Other teams in the league won the Allan Cup: Winnipeg Hockey Club, Winnipeg Falcons, Winnipeg Monarchs and Winnipeg Victorias.

It also was known as the Manitoba Hockey League and Manitoba Professional Hockey League in following years.

== History ==
=== Founding ===
The Manitoba Hockey Association was formed on November 11, 1892 to organize ice hockey play in Manitoba.

=== Manitoba & Northwestern Hockey Association ===
In 1904, it would absorb the Manitoba & Northwestern Hockey Association league, and include the Rat Portage/Kenora Thistles team from the province of Ontario. Kenora, ON was originally named Rat Portage.

=== Manitoba Professional Hockey League (MPHL) ===
In 1905, the league started to have professional players, and renamed itself the Manitoba Professional Hockey League (MPHL). This lasted until the end of the 1908–09 season, when several teams folded. E. A. Gilroy served on the league executive and coached the Portage la Prairie team. Teams in the league also competed for the Fit-Reform Cup, the Western Canada championship.

=== Manitoba Hockey League (MHL) ===
In November 1908, Claude C. Robinson led efforts to establish a senior amateur hockey league in Winnipeg affiliated with the Manitoba Amateur Athletic Association. (Note: The Manitoba Amateur Athletic Association was a provincial branch of the Amateur Athletic Union of Canada.) Robinson coached the Victorias to a Manitoba Hockey League (MHL) championship for the 1908–09 season, and felt that his team could have competed for the newly-established Allan Cup, although challenges from senior ice hockey teams were accepted only from Eastern Canada at the time.

=== Winnipeg Amateur Hockey League ===
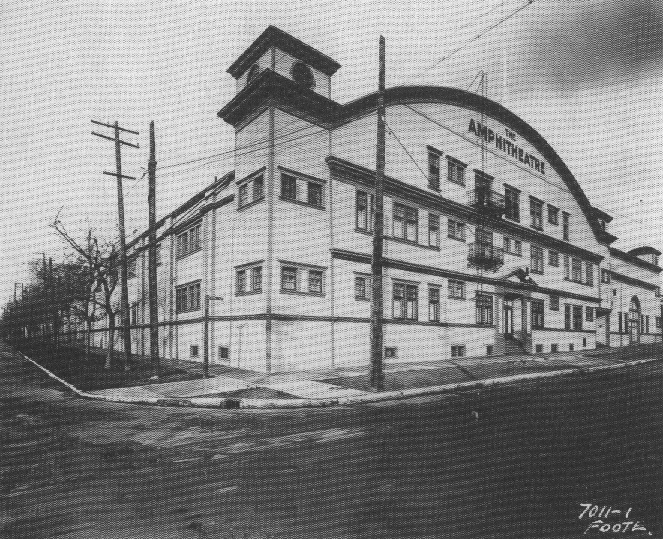
Winnipeg Amphitheatre

The Winnipeg Monarchs led by Fred Marples, made arrangements to play and practice at the Winnipeg Amphitheatre for the 1912–13 season. The decision caused a rift within the league which had an agreement from the previous season to play all games at the Winnipeg Auditorium, which was preferred by the Winnipeg Hockey Club and the Winnipeg Victorias. Marples and the Monarchs felt that the league did not have the authority to bind any club to any single rink, and that the Amphitheatre had better amenities for the players and spectators. As a compromise to have an outside person settle the disagreement, W. F. Taylor was elected president of the league; and Marples was elected as the secretary-treasurer. Taylor then cast a tie-breaking vote to uphold a decision by the previous executive to play all league games at the Auditorium.

The Winnipeg Tribune wrote that the leadership of Taylor and Marples had brought peace and financial stability to the Winnipeg Amateur Hockey League, and both were re-elected for the 1913–14 season. The league chose to play its games at both the Amphitheatre and the Auditorium; and appointed a board of on-ice officials to avoid in-season arguing over the selection of officials, as suggested by Marples.

The Allan Cup trophy

In January 1914, the league debated whether players from leagues from elsewhere in Manitoba and Northwestern Ontario were eligible to be a reserve player. Debate focused on whether these leagues were an equal level of senior hockey, or a lower level of intermediate hockey. The issue was temporarily resolved by asking permission from the other league for the player to be a reserve in another league. The issue resurfaced again in the national playoffs for the Allan Cup. Trustees for the cup struggled to determine player eligibility since there was no authoritative national body to classify leagues by the level of play, and determine who was a senior level player compared to an intermediate level player. The Monarchs won the regular season title and were chosen to defend the first challenge for the 1914 Allan Cup on behalf of the league. When Allan Cup trustee William Northey ruled that Dick Irvin of the Winnipeg Strathconas was ineligible to compete, the Monarchs refused to defend the Allan Cup. Marples considered the Strathconas to be a reserve team for the Monarchs and that the decision was unfair to his team. After three days of negotiating, the Monarchs agreed to play without Irvin in a one-game Allan Cup challenge versus the Kenora Thistles, instead of the customary two-game series decided on total goals scored. The Monarchs won versus the Kenora Thistles, then lost the second Allan Cup challenge in a one-game final to the Regina Victorias.

Allan Cup trustee Claude C. Robinson, suggested that a governing body be formed for hockey in Canada, which was echoed by similar calls from The Winnipeg Tribune and the Winnipeg Free Press. The league met on June 23, 1914, to form a governing body to oversee hockey in Manitoba. Taylor was appointed chairman and Marples was appointed secretary of a provisional commission which later became the Manitoba Amateur Hockey Association (MAHA), and sought to merge into a national commission when such a body became established. The Canadian Amateur Hockey Association (CAHA) was founded on December 4, 1914, with Taylor elected as its first president, and Robinson elected as its first secretary.

For the 1914–15 season, the league adopted all Allan Cup rules and player eligibility. The league also supported formation of the Winnipeg Intermediate Hockey League for the second-tier teams of its clubs, and appointed Robinson chairman of the intermediate league.

The Winnipeg Amateur Hockey League included teams composed of military personnel for the 1915–16 season, and raised funds to support soldiers and the war effort. The league was renamed to the Winnipeg Patriotic Hockey League.

During World War I, the league donated a portion of profits towards patriotic funds to support the war effort. The Monarchs repeated as league champions in the 1914–15 season and defeated the Melville Millionaires to win the 1915 Allan Cup. Robert McKay succeeded Taylor as league president in 1915, as registration of players decreased due to enlistments during the war. The league renamed itself the Patriotic Hockey League as of the 1915–16 season, which saw the Winnipeg 61st Battalion win the 1916 Allan Cup. The Winnipeg Patriotic Hockey League became the Winnipeg Military Hockey League during the 1917–18 season, and its teams were temporarily renamed for battles fought during the war.

== Teams ==
Season	Teams	Champion
1892–93	Winnipeg Dragoons, Winnipeg HC, Winnipeg Victorias	Winnipeg Victorias
1893–94	Winnipeg Dragoons, Winnipeg HC, Winnipeg Victorias	Winnipeg Victorias
1894–95	Winnipeg HC, Winnipeg Victorias	Winnipeg Victorias
1895–96	Winnipeg HC, Winnipeg Victorias	Winnipeg Victorias†
1896–97	Winnipeg HC, Winnipeg Victorias	Winnipeg Victorias
1897–98	Winnipeg HC, Winnipeg Victorias	Winnipeg Victorias
1898–99	Winnipeg HC, Winnipeg Victorias	Winnipeg Victorias
1899–1900	Winnipeg HC, Winnipeg Victorias	Winnipeg Victorias
1900–01	Winnipeg HC, Winnipeg Victorias	Winnipeg Victorias†
1901–02	Winnipeg HC, Winnipeg Victorias	Winnipeg Victorias
1902–03	Winnipeg Rowing Club, Winnipeg Victorias	Winnipeg Rowing Club
1903–04	Winnipeg Rowing Club, Winnipeg Victorias	Winnipeg Rowing Club
1904–05	Brandon Wheat City, Portage la Prairie Cities, Rat Portage Thistles, Winnipeg Rowing Club, Winnipeg Victorias	Rat Portage Thistles
1905–06	Brandon Wheat City, Kenora Thistles, Portage la Prairie City, Winnipeg HC, Winnipeg Victorias	Kenora Thistles

† Stanley Cup winner.

=== Manitoba Professional Hockey League ===
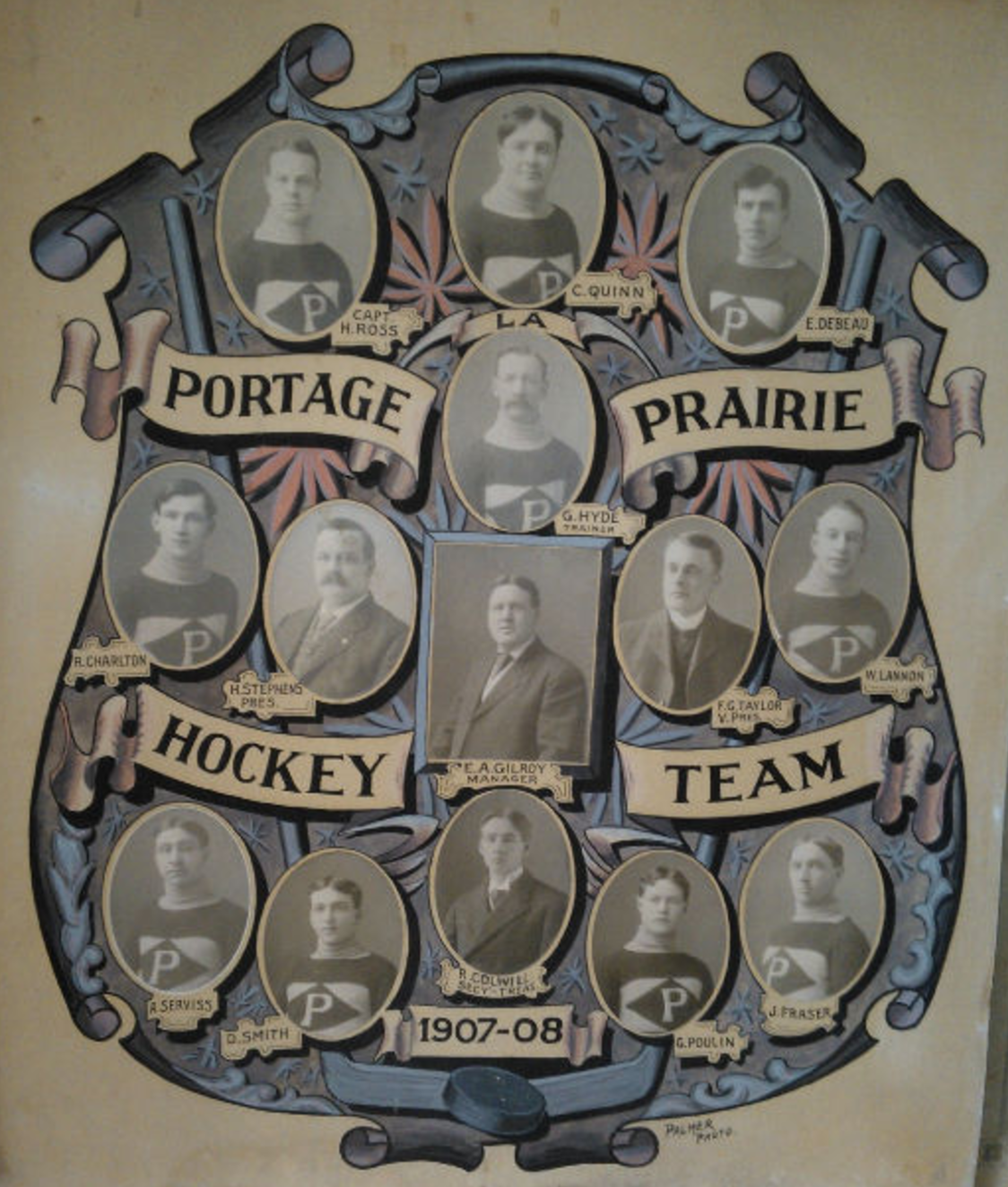
Portage la Prairie hockey team in the 1907–08 season

Season	Teams	Champion
1906–07	Brandon Wheat City, Kenora Thistles, Portage la Prairie Cities, Winnipeg Strathconas	Kenora Thistles‡
1907–08	Brandon Wheat City†, Kenora Thistles†, Portage la Prairie Cities, Winnipeg Maple Leafs, Winnipeg Strathconas	Winnipeg Maple Leafs
1908–09	Winnipeg HC, Winnipeg Maple Leafs, Winnipeg Shamrocks	Winnipeg Shamrocks

‡ Stanley Cup winner.
† Brandon and Kenora only played one game in 1907–08 season before ceasing play.

=== Manitoba Hockey League ===
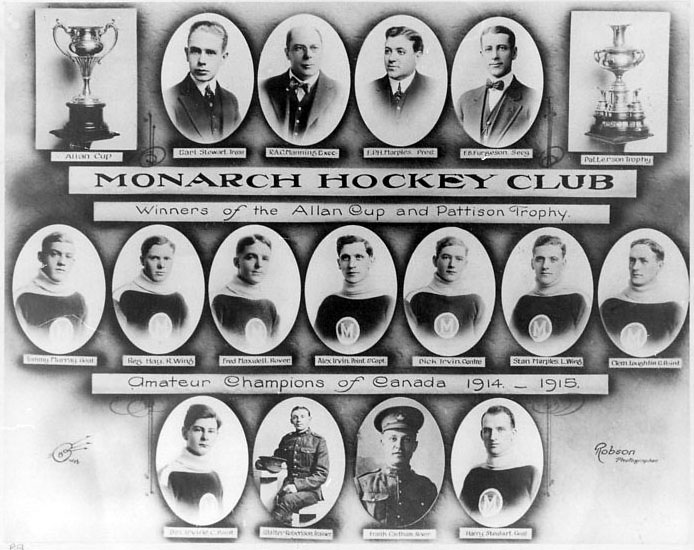
Winnipeg Monarchs in 1915

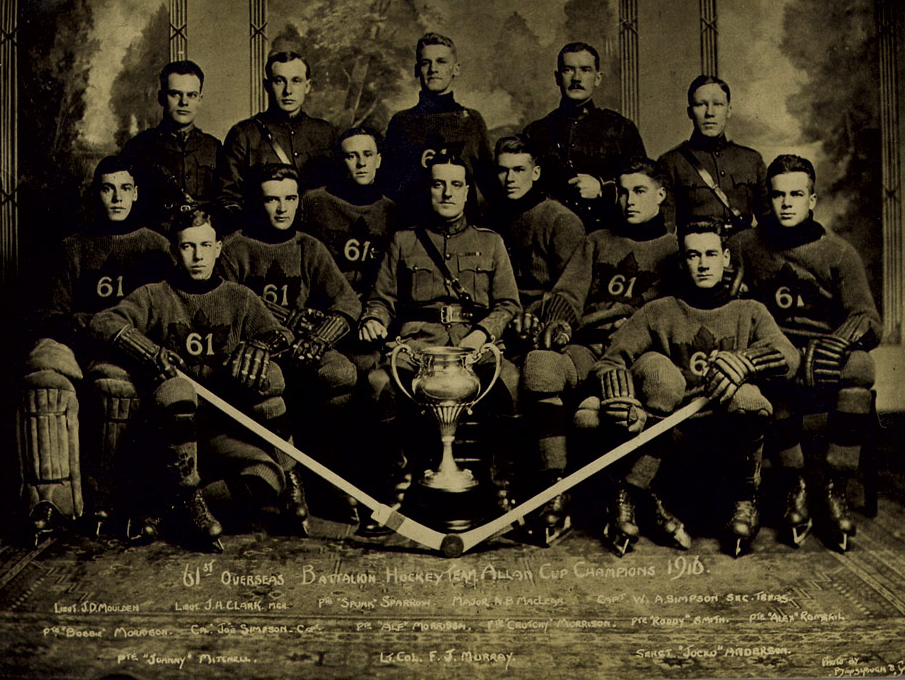
Winnipeg 61st Battalion in 1916

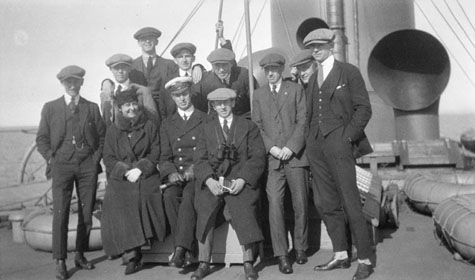
Winnipeg Falcons en route to the 1920 Olympics

In parallel with the MPHL, the MHA started the MHL amateur senior league in 1908–09. The Winnipeg Falcons, which entered the league in 1915, would win the 1920 championship, then win the Allan Cup national championship. As Allan Cup winners, the Falcons were selected to represent Canada at the 1920 Olympics, where the team would win the first Olympic gold medal for ice hockey.

Notes:
WAHL = Winnipeg Amateur Hockey League, MMHL = Manitoba Military Hockey League

Season	Teams	Champion
1908–09	Winnipeg Capitals, Winnipeg Varsity, Winnipeg Victorias	Winnipeg Victorias
1909–10	Winnipeg Capitals, Winnipeg Varsity, Winnipeg Victorias	Winnipeg Varsity
1910–11	Winnipeg Monarchs, Winnipeg Varsity, Winnipeg Victorias	Winnipeg Victorias‡
1911–12	Winnipeg Monarchs, Winnipeg Varsity, Winnipeg Victorias	Winnipeg Victorias‡
1912–13	Winnipeg HC, Winnipeg Varsity, Winnipeg Victorias	Winnipeg HC‡
1913–14 WAHL	Winnipeg Monarchs, Winnipeg Victorias, Winnipeg HC	Winnipeg Monarchs
1914–15	Winnipeg Monarchs, Winnipeg Varsity, Winnipeg Victorias	Winnipeg Monarchs‡
1915–16 A	Winnipeg 61st Battalion, Winnipeg Monarchs, Winnipeg Soldiers	Winnipeg 61st Battalion‡
1915–16 B	Winnipeg Falcons, Winnipeg HC, Winnipeg Victorias	Winnipeg Monarchs
1916–17 WAHL	Winnipeg Victorias, Winnipeg 223rd Battalion, Winnipeg Monarchs	Winnipeg Victorias
1917–18 MMHL	Winnipeg Ypres, Winnipeg Vimy, Winnipeg Somme	Winnipeg Ypres
1918–19	Brandon Wheat City, Selkirk Fishermen, Winnipeg Argonauts, Winnipeg Monarchs	Selkirk Fishermen
1919–20 Manitoba	Brandon Wheat City, Selkirk Fishermen, Winnipeg Falcons	Winnipeg Falcons‡ †
1919–20 Winnipeg	Winnipeg HC, Winnipeg Monarchs, Winnipeg Victorias	Winnipeg HC
1920–21	Brandon Wheat City, Winnipeg Falcons, Winnipeg HC	Brandon Wheat City
1921–22 Manitoba	Brandon Wheat City, Selkirk Fishermen, Winnipeg Falcons, Winnipeg HC	Brandon Wheat City
1921–22 Winnipeg	Winnipeg Monarchs, Winnipeg Tigers, Winnipeg Varsity, Winnipeg Victorias	Winnipeg Victorias
1922–23	Brandon Wheat City, Fort William Beavers, Port Arthur Bearcats, Selkirk Fishermen, Winnipeg Falcons, Winnipeg HC	Brandon Wheat City

‡ Allan Cup winners. † Olympic champions.

== See also ==
- List of Stanley Cup champions
- Hockey Manitoba
