= Edmonton Hockey Club =

Canadian amateur ice hockey team

The Edmonton Hockey Club was a Canadian amateur men's ice hockey club first organized in 1894 and formally established in 1896. The club consisted of two teams, the Thistles who were the elite players, and the Stars who were young prospects. The Thistles played for the Stanley Cup twice, losing each time; in 1908 versus the Montreal Wanderers and in 1910 versus the Ottawa Senators. The club folded in 1910 and the Thistles were replaced by the Edmonton Eskimos as Edmonton's elite team.

== Foundation ==
The Thistles were first organized in 1894, and were the first hockey team in Edmonton to hold regular practices. They named one Inspector Snyder as their first captain. The team was made up of the local well-to-do, mostly of British (especially Scottish) extraction, thence the allusion to the Scottish thistle. They played the first recorded game in the city's history in 1894. In 1895 they played a series of games against North-West Mounted Police officers from Fort Saskatchewan. The Edmonton Hockey Club was officially founded on 20 November 1896. and consisted of two team, the senior Thisles, and the junior Stars. The Stars played against their cross-river rivals, the South Edmonton Shamrocks, for the first time on 1 January 1896, and the Thistles first played the Shamrocks on 31 January 1896. Soon-to-be mayor William Antrobus Griesbach was a member of the Stars in 1896 and soon moved up the Thistles, though was never a star player.

For their first season, games were played on North Saskatchewan River, with an outdoor rink constructed in 1896 at Jasper Avenue and First Street, and this was the club's home until local businessman Richard Secord sponsored the construction of the new indoor Thistle Rink at 102 Avenue and 102 Street with a capacity of 2,000 spectators it became a central part of the small Edmonton and area population's social scene.

Founded as the Edmonton Hockey Club in 1905, the club helped found the Alberta Amateur Hockey Association in 1907. In 1908 and 1910, the Edmonton club would challenge for the Stanley Cup. Although the club was technically amateur, the club hired Tommy Phillips, Didier Pitre and Lester Patrick for the challenge, and only one player who had played from the regular season played in the challenge against the Montreal Wanderers. It was to no avail, as the Wanderers won the series.

The Edmonton Hockey Club folded after 1910, and the Eskimos club was formed for the 1910–11 season by Deacon White from the remains of the organization.

== See also ==
- List of ice hockey teams in Alberta
