= Tony Gingras =

Canadian ice hockey player (1875–1937)

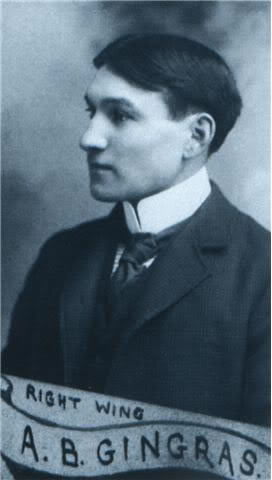
- Gingras with the Winnipeg Victorias in the 1899–1900 season.
- Born: October 20, 1876 Saint Boniface, Manitoba, Canada
- Died: April 27, 1937 (aged 60) Winnipeg, Manitoba, Canada
- Position: Right wing
- Played for: Winnipeg Victorias
- Playing career: 1895–1904

Antoine Blanc Gingras (October 20, 1875 – April 27, 1937) was a top scoring Canadian amateur ice hockey right winger who was active in the late 1890s and early 1900s. Born at Saint Boniface, Winnipeg, to Métis parents François Gingras and Annie McMurray, he was named for his grandfather, Antoine Blanc Gingras, a well-known fur trader and one of the founders of St. Joseph (now Walhalla), North Dakota.

Gingras played with the Winnipeg Victorias of the Manitoba Hockey Association and won the Stanley Cup twice with the team, in 1901 against the Montreal Shamrocks and in 1902 against the Toronto Wellingtons. On the Victorias team Gingras formed a successful partnership with center forward Dan Bain.

Gingras died in Winnipeg in 1937.
