= Mike Grant =

Canadian ice hockey player (1873–1955)

- Hockey Hall of Fame, 1950
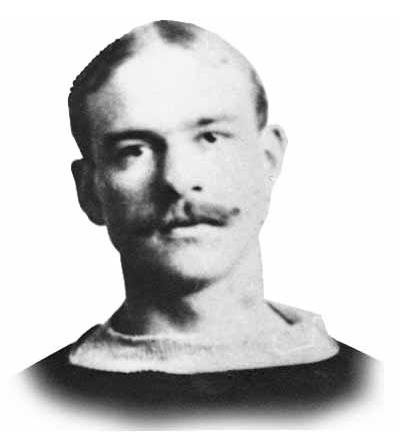
- Born: November 27, 1873 Montreal, Quebec, Canada
- Died: August 20, 1955 (aged 81) Montreal, Quebec, Canada
- Height: 5 ft 10 in (178 cm)
- Weight: 170 lb (77 kg; 12 st 2 lb)
- Position: Defence/Cover-point
- Played for: Montreal Victorias; Montreal Shamrocks
- Playing career: 1894–1902

Michael Grant (November 27, 1873 – August 20, 1955) was a Canadian ice hockey player. He played nine seasons of senior amateur hockey between 1894 and 1902 for the Montreal Victorias and Montreal Shamrocks. Grant was a member of the Victorias squad that won or retained possession of the Stanley Cup five times between 1895 and 1899 during the trophy's challenge era. Grant played cover-point and was known for his speed and skating ability. He is regarded as one of the first defenceman to rush forward and with the puck. He was inducted into the Hockey Hall of Fame in 1950.

== Playing career ==
A gifted and fast skater, Grant won speed skating championships at three different age groups when he was 11 years old. He also played amateur lacrosse while he grew up in Montreal, Quebec. His skills transferred to the hockey rink where Grant played cover point (defence). He is regarded as one of the first rushing defencemen in hockey history; Grant used his skating ability to generate offensive chances from his defensive position. He played his youth hockey with the Crystals organization that won the Montreal city junior championship in 1891 and intermediate championships in 1892 and 1893.

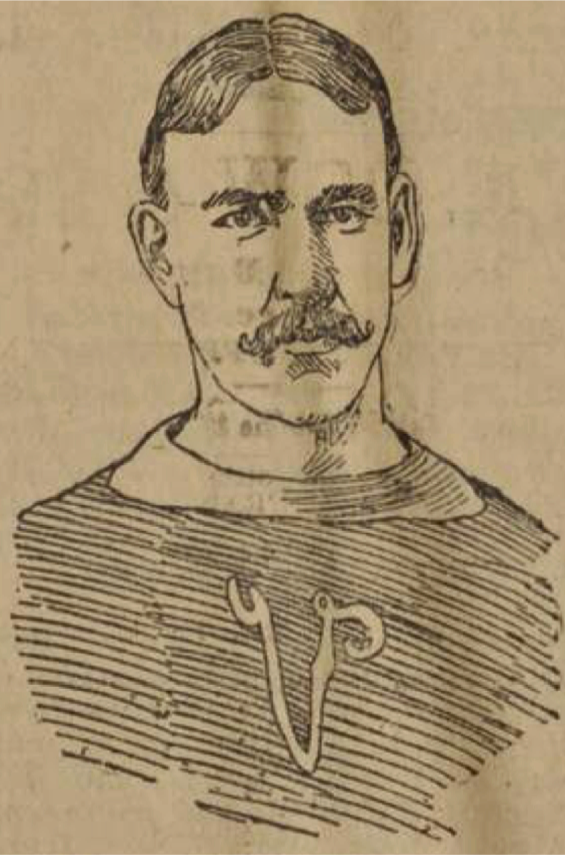
Grant with the Montreal Victorias

Grant graduated to the senior ranks in 1894 where he made his debut with the Montreal Victorias of the Amateur Hockey Association of Canada (AHAC). He scored one goal in eight games in 1895 and the Victorias, with a record of six wins and two losses, won the AHAC title, and with it, control of the Stanley Cup, emblematic of Canada's senior amateur championship. Grant served as captain of the team.

The Montreal Victorias were challenged for control of the Stanley Cup by the Winnipeg Victorias in February 1896, and lost the trophy by a 2–0 score in a one-game playoff. Montreal regained the Stanley Cup in December of that year, defeating Winnipeg 6–5. In AHAC play, Grant scored three goals in eight games in both the 1896 and 1897 seasons. He captained the Victorias to a successful defence of the Stanley Cup in 1897 and the team retained the trophy in 1898 by virtue of winning the AHAC title.

The AHAC disbanded in 1898, and the Victorias moved to the newly formed Canadian Amateur Hockey League (CAHL) for the 1899 season. Grant scored two goals in seven games in CAHL play. During the season, Grant and his teammates fielded another Stanley Cup challenge from the Winnipeg Victorias. They retained the trophy following a two-game series; it was Grant's fifth and final Stanley Cup win. Grant was offered a professional contract in New York that was worth the equivalent of $3,500 per year in the earl 1900s, but opted to remain in Montreal. After playing the 1900 CAHL season with the Victorias, he was loaned to the cross-town Montreal Shamrocks in 1901 as an emergency replacement for Frank Tansey. Grant appeared in two league games, and two Stanley Cup challenge games for the team before returning to the Victorias for a final season in 1901.

== Post-playing career and personal life ==
Grant remained active in hockey following his playing career. He became a referee and officiated several Stanley Cup challenge games. Among them was the 1905 challenge series between the Ottawa Hockey Club and the Rat Portage Thistles. A physical and sometimes violent series, Grant famously wore a hard derby hat while on the ice. Grant later traveled around the United States where he organized demonstrations of the sport and staged exhibition games, making him one of the sport's first ambassadors. He was inducted into the Hockey Hall of Fame in 1950.

Grant's father, Alex, was a blacksmith and his family's Montreal business dated back to the 1830s. Grant became involved in horse racing through his family's blacksmithing connections and served as a paddock judge for over 40 years. Grant had five children: daughters Dorothy and Reta and sons Graham, Don and Kenny. Don was an original part-owner and chairman of Major League Baseball's New York Mets.

== Career statistics ==
			Regular season					Playoffs
Season	Team	League	GP	G	A	Pts	PIM	GP	G	A	Pts	PIM
1894	Montreal Victorias	AHAC	5	0	0	0	0	1	0	0	0	0
1895	Montreal Victorias	AHAC	8	1	0	1	0	—	—	—	—	—
1896	Montreal Victorias	AHAC	8	3	0	3	0	2	0	0	0	0
1897	Montreal Victorias	AHAC	8	3	0	3	0	1	0	0	0	0
1898	Montreal Victorias	AHAC	8	1	0	1	0	—	—	—	—	—
1899	Montreal Victorias	CAHL	7	2	0	2	0	2	0	0	0	0
1900	Montreal Victorias	CAHL	2	0	0	0	0	—	—	—	—	—
1901	Montreal Shamrocks	CAHL	2	0	0	0	0	2	0	0	0	0
1902	Montreal Victorias	CAHL	7	0	0	0	0	—	—	—	—	—
Career totals			55	10	0	10	0	8	0	0	0	0
