= Jack Brannen =

Canadian ice hockey player

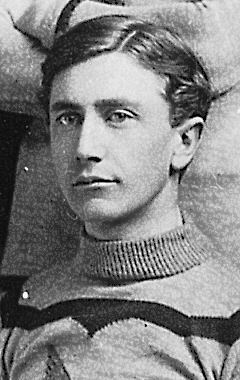
- Brannen with Montreal Shamrocks in 1899
- Born: September 13, 1874 Kenmore, Ontario, Canada
- Died: October 25, 1964 (aged 90)
- Position: Rover
- Played for: Montreal Shamrocks
- Playing career: c. 1896–1901

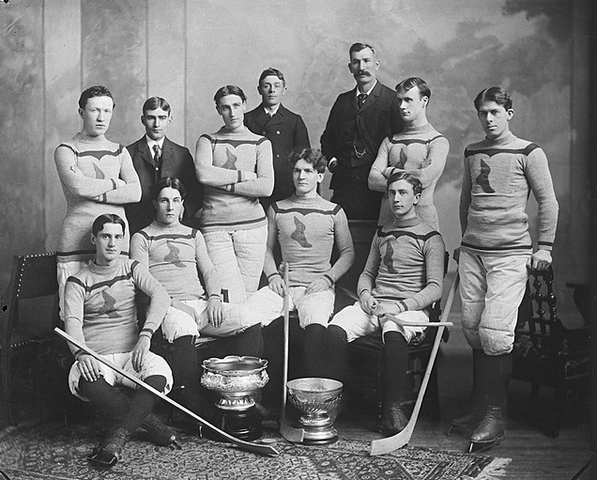
Brannen, sitting at far right above the Stanley Cup, with the Montreal Shamrocks in 1899.

John Patrick "Jack, Doctor" Brannen (September 13, 1874 – October 25, 1964) was a Canadian amateur ice hockey player who was active in the late 1890s and early 1900s. Brannen played as a rover, a position between defense and attack, for the Montreal Shamrocks in the AHAC and CAHL between 1896 and 1901. He won two Stanley Cups with the Shamrocks, in 1899 and 1900. Brannen also played with the Shamrocks in a Stanley Cup challenge series in 1901, but the team lost to the Winnipeg Victorias.

Brannen was born in Kenmore, Ontario in 1874. After his career in ice hockey he moved to northern New York where he worked as a medical doctor, though he occasionally acted as an umpire at hockey games in Montreal. He died in 1964, 90 years old.

== Playing style ==
Jack Brannen was noted for his speed, which made him suitable for the free roaming rover position, and occasionally competed in speed skating events. In 1900 he won a 220-yard race in Montreal against some of the best speed skaters in the world, among them Norwegian Peter Sinnerud and American world titleholder Morris Wood. On the Montreal Shamrocks team Brannen played on a forward line with Harry Trihey, Arthur Farrell and Fred Scanlan, all three of whom later on were inducted into the Hockey Hall of Fame.

== Statistics ==
			League
Season	Team	League	GP	G
1897	Montreal Shamrocks	AHAC
1898	Montreal Shamrocks	AHAC	7	0
1899	Montreal Shamrocks	CAHL	8	8
	Montreal Shamrocks	Stanley Cup	1	0
1900	Montreal Shamrocks	CAHL	8	6
	Montreal Shamrocks	Stanley Cup	5	4
1901	Montreal Shamrocks	CAHL	6	4
	Montreal Shamrocks	Stanley Cup	2	1
CAHL totals			22	18
Stanley Cup totals			8	5

Statistics per SIHR at sihrhockey.org
