= 1899 CAHL season =

Ice hockey season

- League: Canadian Amateur Hockey League
- Sport: Ice hockey
- Duration: January 7 – March 4, 1899
- Teams: 5

1899
- Champions: Montreal Shamrocks
- Top scorer: Harry Trihey (19 goals)

CAHL seasons
- ← 1898 (AHAC) 1900 →

The 1899 CAHL season was the inaugural season of the Canadian Amateur Hockey League. Teams played an eight-game schedule. The Montreal Shamrocks were the league champion with a record of seven wins and one loss. Both the Shamrocks and the Montreal Victorias won Stanley Cup challenges to retain the Stanley Cup for the league.

== Season ==
=== Highlights ===
The January 26 game between Montreal and Quebec was protested because it was alleged that the referee, Fred Chittick, Ottawa's goalkeeper, was drunk. The game was rescheduled for February 14, to be played in Ottawa, but in the end, Quebec declined to play the game.

On February 4, when Shamrocks defeated Quebec at Montreal by a score of 13–4, Harry Trihey scored 10 goals.

The Victorias defeated Ottawa at Montreal on February 11, by a score of 16–0. Fred Chittick attempted to score by himself, rushing the length of the ice from his net, without success.

The race for the championship was decided on March 1, when Shamrocks defeated the Victorias 1–0. Eight thousand people are recorded as being in attendance, thousands of dollars was wagered and Harry Trihey of Shamrocks scored the deciding goal.

After losing their first six matches, Quebec withdrew from the rest of the schedule, forfeiting their last two games.

=== Final standing ===
Note GP = Games Played, W = Wins, L = Losses, T = Ties, GF = Goals For, GA = Goals Against

Team	GP	W	L	T	GF	GA
Montreal Shamrocks	8	7	1	0	40	21
Montreal Victorias	8	6	2	0	44	23
Ottawa Hockey Club	8	4	4	0	21	43
Montreal Hockey Club	8	3	5	0	30	29
Quebec Hockey Club	8	0	8	0	12	31

=== Results ===
Month	Day	Visitor	Score	Home	Score
Jan.	7	Quebec HC	1	Montreal HC	7
Jan.	7	Shamrocks	3	Ottawa HC	4
Jan.	10	Victorias	4	Montreal HC	2
Jan.	14	Quebec	1	Ottawa HC	3
Jan.	14	Shamrocks	4	Montreal HC	3
Jan.	21 (†)	Montreal HC	1	Quebec HC	2
Jan.	21	Shamrocks	5	Victorias	2
Jan.	28	Ottawa HC	1	Montreal HC	5
Jan.	28	Victorias	5	Quebec HC	4
Feb.	4	Quebec HC	4	Shamrocks	13
Feb.	4	Victorias	7	Ottawa HC	5
Feb.	8	Shamrocks	4	Montreal HC	3
Feb.	11	Ottawa HC	0	Victorias	16
Feb.	11	Shamrocks	3	Quebec HC	2
Feb.	18	Montreal HC	4	Ottawa HC	5
Feb.	25	Victorias	10	Montreal HC	6
Mar.	1	Victorias	0	Shamrocks	1
Mar.	4 (††)	Ottawa HC	3	Shamrocks	7
Mar.	‡	Ottawa HC		Quebec HC	
Mar.	₳	Quebec HC		Victorias	

† Montreal refused to continue with 12 minutes to play. Game was to be replayed on February 14, but Quebec declined and the game was defaulted.

†† Shamrocks clinch league championship.

‡ defaulted to Ottawa

₳ defaulted to Victorias

== Player Stats ==
=== Leading scorers ===
Note: GP = Games played, G = Goals scored

Name	Club	GP	G
Harry Trihey	Shamrocks	7	19
Clare McKerrow	Montreal HC	4	12
Russell Bowie	Victorias	7	11
Cam Davidson	Victorias	7	9
Arthur Farrell	Shamrocks	8	8
Jack Brannen	Shamrocks	8	8
Bob McDougall	Victorias	2	7
Jack Ewing	Victorias	5	7
Mac Roger	Ottawa HC	5	6
Billy Christmas	Montreal HC	4	5

=== Goaltending averages ===
Note GP = Games played, GA = Goals against, SO = Shutouts, GAA = Goals against average

Name	Club	GP	GA	SO	GAA
Gordon Lewis	Victorias	3	7	1	2.3
James H. McKenna	Shamrocks	8	21	1	2.6
Herb Collins	Montreal HC	6	19		3.2
Frank Richardson	Victorias	4	16		4.0
John Bouse Hutton	Ottawa HC	2	11		5.5
Frank Stocking	Quebec HC	4	24		6.0
Fred Chittick	Ottawa HC	5	32		6.4
Mark O'Meara	Quebec HC	1	7		7.0
Fred Munro	Montreal HC	1	10		10.0

=== Exhibitions ===
During the season, the Shamrocks travelled to New York City to play two games against the New York Hockey Club. After the season, the Shamrocks travelled to Nova Scotia and New Brunswick to play exhibitions. On March 7, the Shamrocks played the Halifax Crescents to a 1–1 draw, and on March 9, defeated the Crescents 4–2. On March 10, the Shamrocks played the Saint John Mohawks in Saint John, New Brunswick, defeating the Mohawks by a 5–0 score.

The Victorias travelled to New York City to play the Brooklyn Skating Club. The Victorias defeated Brooklyn 5–2 on March 10 at St. Nicholas Rink. The Shamrocks, after the Cup challenge of Queen's, travelled to New York. On March 16, the Shamrocks defeated the All-New-York team 5–2. The Shamrocks then played Brooklyn on March 18, winning over Brooklyn 9–7.

== Stanley Cup challenges ==
=== Victorias vs. Winnipeg ===
Montreal received another challenge from the MHA's Winnipeg Victorias. This time, it was decided that they would play a two-game total goals series in February 1899.

The first game was won by Montreal 2–1. Winnipeg's captain Dan Bain injured his eye and did not play in the second game due to hemorrhaging behind the eye.

The second game ended in controversy. With Montreal leading the game 3–2 with about 12 minutes left in the game, Montreal's Bob MacDougall violently slashed Winnipeg's Tony Gingras. As Gingras was carried off the ice, referee Bill Findlay only called Macdougall for a two-minute minor. Angry that he should have been accessed a larger penalty, Winnipeg went into their dressing room in protest. Insulted, Findlay abruptly went home, but returned after officials followed him on a sleigh and persuaded him to return. Once back at the rink, the referee gave Winnipeg 15 minutes to return to the ice themselves. They refused and thus Findlay disqualified the team and declared Montreal the winners. 4,000 were attending the Winnipeg Auditorium rink to hear returns of the game by telegraph.

Date	Winning Team	Score	Losing Team	Location
February 15, 1899	Montreal Victorias	2–1	Winnipeg Victorias	Montreal Arena, Montreal
February 18, 1899	Montreal Victorias	3–2	Winnipeg Victorias	Montreal Arena, Montreal
Montreal wins total goals series 5 goals to 3

February 15, 1899
Winnipeg	1		Victorias	2
George Merritt		G	Gordon Lewis	
Bobby Benson		P	Graham Drinkwater, Capt	1
Charles Johnstone		CP	Mike Grant	
Tony Gingras	1	F	Cam Davidson	
Dan Bain		F	Ernie McLea	
Jack Armytage, Capt		F	Robert MacDougall	1
Attie Howard		F	Russell Bowie	
Colin "Tote" Campbell		sub		
Referee – J. Findlay

February 18, 1899
Winnipeg	2		Victorias	3
George Merritt		G	Gordon Lewis	
Bobby Benson		P	Graham Drinkwater, Capt	
Charles Johnstone		CP	Mike Grant	
Tony Gingras		F	Cam Davidson	
Colin "Tote" Campbell		F	Ernie McLea	
Jack Armytage, Capt	1	F	Robert McDougall	2
Attie Howard	1	F	Russell Bowie	1
Referee – J. Findlay

The Stanley Cup passed from the Montreal Victorias to the Montreal Shamrocks as champions of the league March 4, 1899.

=== Shamrocks vs. Queens ===
The Shamrocks defended the trophy against Queen's University of Kingston, Ontario. The game was played half under Ontario rules and half under CAHL rules.

Date	Winning Team	Score	Losing Team	Location
March 14, 1899	Montreal Shamrocks	6–2	Queen's University	Montreal Arena

March 14, 1899
Queens	2		Shamrocks	6
Robert Carroll Hiscock		G	James H. McKenna	
Guy Curtis		P	Frank Tansey, Capt	
J. Ward Merrill		CP	Frank Wall	
Jock Harty		F	Harry Trihey	3
George Dalton	1	F	Arthur Farrell	2
Robert R. Carr-Harris	1	F	Fred Scanlan	1
Knox Walkem		F	Jack P. Brannen	
Referee – Harvey Pulford

== Player statistics ==
=== Scoring Leaders ===
Note: GP = Games played, G = Goals scored

Name	Club	GP	G
Harry Trihey	Shamrocks	7	19
Clare McKerrow	Montreal HC	4	12
Russell Bowie	Victorias	7	11
Cam Davidson	Victorias	7	9
Arthur Farrell	Shamrocks	8	8
Jack Brannen	Shamrocks	8	8
Bob McDougall	Victorias	2	7
Jack Ewing	Victorias	5	7
Mac Roger	Ottawa HC	5	6
Billy Christmas	Montreal HC	4	5

=== Goaltending averages ===
Note GP = Games played, GA = Goals against, SO = Shutouts, GAA = Goals against average

Name	Club	GP	GA	SO	GAA
Gordon Lewis	Victorias	3	7	1	2.3
James H. McKenna	Shamrocks	8	21	1	2.6
Herb Collins	Montreal HC	6	19		3.2
Frank Richardson	Victorias	4	16		4.0
John Bouse Hutton	Ottawa HC	2	11		5.5
Frank Stocking	Quebec HC	4	24		6.0
Fred Chittick	Ottawa HC	5	32		6.4
Mark O'Meara	Quebec HC	1	7		7.0
Fred Munro	Montreal HC	1	10		10.0

== Stanley Cup engravings ==
1899 Montreal Victorias
Players
Forwards
Russell Bowie
Douglas Acer ^ @
Cam Davidson ^
Jack Ewing ^
Robert MacDougall ^
Ernie McLea ^
Fred McRobie ^
Defencemen
Graham Drinkwater (point – captain)
Mike Grant (cover point)
Goaltenders
Gordon Lewis
Frank Richardson †

- † Playing-Coach
- ^ unknown who played center, rover, right wing, and left wing, so the players are listed as forwards
- @ missing from the team picture

Non-players:

- Handbury C. Budden (President)
- Frank Howard Wilson (Hon. President)
- J. Stafford Bishop (secretary/treasurer)
- 1 non-player's first name is unknown

1899 Montreal Shamrocks
Players
Forwards
Jack P. Brannen (rover)
Arthur Farrell (center) ^
Fred Scanlan (left wing) ^
Harry Trihey (center/right wing – captain)
John Dobby ^
Charles Hoerner ^
Defencemen
Frank Tansey (point)
Frank Wall (cover point)
Goaltender
Jim McKenna

- ^ unknown who played center, right wing and left wing, so the players are listed as forwards
- † Only the trainers were included on the team picture; these are the other official non-players with Montreal Shamrocks in 1899
- & unknown first name

non-players=

- Harry W. McLaughlin (president), C.M. Hart† (vice-president)
- W.H. Kearney† (Director)&, C.F. Smith† (director)
- Barney Dunphy (Coach/Trainer), C. Foley (ass't trainer)
- All non-players' first names are unknown except for the coach and president

== See also ==
- List of Stanley Cup challenge games
- List of Stanley Cup champions

Preceded by Montreal Victorias; 1898	Montreal Shamrocks; Stanley Cup Champions; 1899	Succeeded by Montreal Shamrocks; 1900
Preceded by 1898 AHAC season	CAHL seasons 1899	Succeeded by 1900 CAHL season
