= List of members of the Original Hockey Hall of Fame =

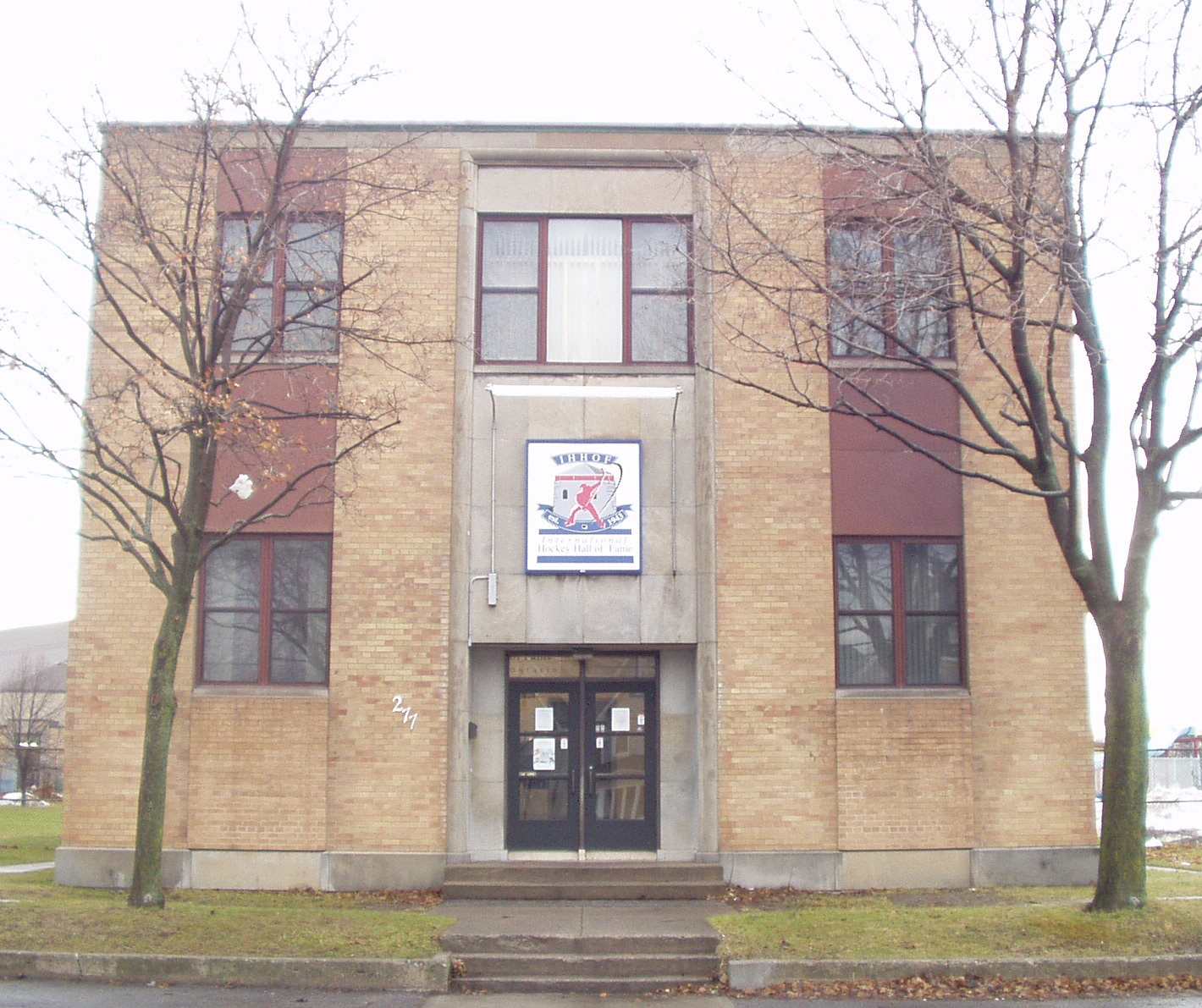
Original Hockey Hall of Fame building (1965-2012) (now demolished)

The Original Hockey Hall of Fame, formerly the International Hockey Hall of Fame, was founded on September 10, 1943, in Kingston, Ontario, Canada. On April 25, 1941, a report in the Montreal Gazette stated that the movement to establish the Hall of Fame was "started by Fred Corcoran to have something similar for hockey now that baseball and golf have their own hall of fame." With the movement started a city would need to be named to house the Hall of Fame. Kingston was chosen thanks to James T. Sutherland’s passionate argument that Kingston was the birthplace of hockey stating:

There may be some who still claim sundry and diverse places as being the authentic spot or locality. Whatever measure of merit the claim of other places may have, I think it is generally admitted and has been substantially proven on many former occasions that the actual birthplace of organized hockey is the city of Kingston, in the year 1888.

With the establishment of the Hall of Fame, it became the first sports Hall of Fame in Canada. However, establishing a permanent building for the Hall of Fame became delayed by bureaucracy and lack of building funds. With no facility competed by 1958, the President of the National Hockey League Clarence Campbell withdrew the league's support of the Kingston-based Hall of Fame. Campbell decided instead to establish the NHL’s own Hockey Hall of Fame in Toronto, Ontario. The Hall of Fame honoured 40 members before the National Hockey League removed its support; these first 40 members of the Hall of Fame were recognized in the new Hockey Hall of Fame. In 1966, the Hall of Fame honoured two more members (Busher Jackson and Bun Cook), who were the last to gain this honour. These two were also inducted into the Toronto Hockey Hall of Fame, although at later dates: Jackson in 1971, and Cook in 1995.

== Members ==
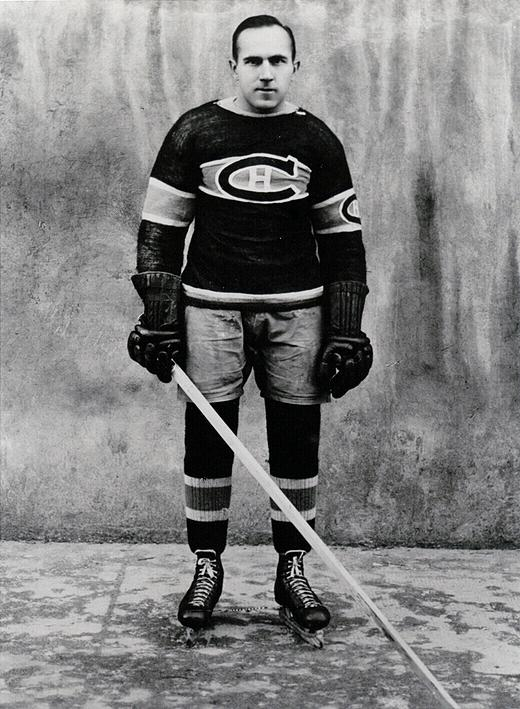
Howie Morenz, inducted in 1945

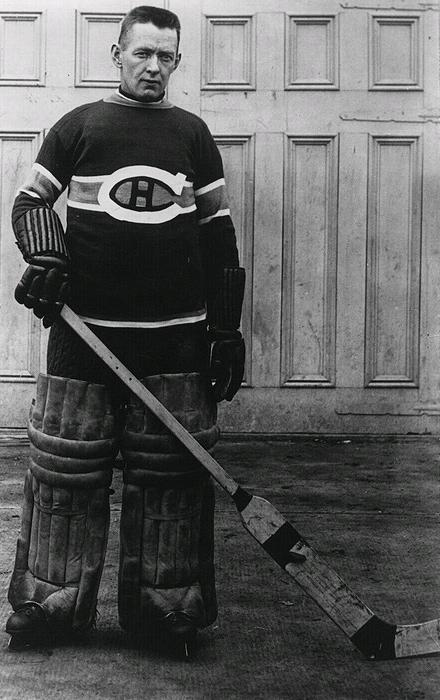
Georges Vezina, inducted in 1945.

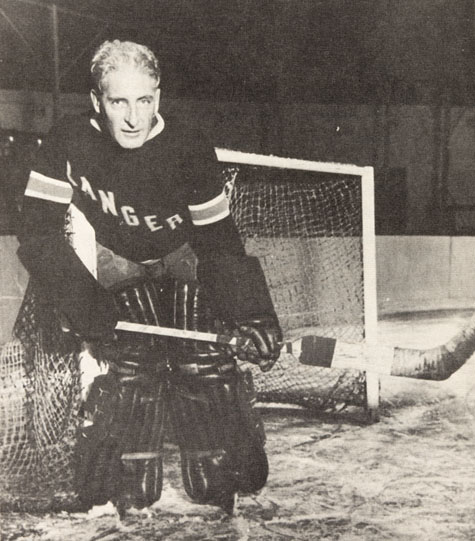
Lester Patrick, inducted in 1947.

Name^{†}	Category	Year elected	Most prevalent team/contribution
Sir Mountagu Allan	Builder	1945	Donated the Allan Cup
Donald Bain	Player	1949	Winnipeg Victorias
“Hobie” A.H. Baker	Player	1945	Princeton University
Richard R. Boon	Player	1952	Montreal Hockey Club
Russell Bowie	Player	1947	Montreal Victorias
Frank Calder	Builder	1947	First NHL President
Aubrey “Dit” Clapper	Player	1947	Boston Bruins
Fred “Bun” Cook	Player	1966	New York Rangers
William Cook	Player	1952	New York Rangers
Allen M. “Scotty” Davidson	Player	1950	Toronto Blueshirts
Charles Graham Drinkwater	Player	1950	Montreal Victorias
Charles R “Chuck” Gardiner	Player	1945	Chicago Blackhawks
Eddie Gerard	Player	1945	Ottawa Senators
Frank “Moose” Goheen	Player	1952	St. Paul Saints
Silas “Si” Griffis	Player	1950	Vancouver Millionaires
William A. Hewitt	Builder	1947	Sportswriter
Harvey “Busher” Jackson	Player	1966	Toronto Maple Leafs
Ernie “Moose” Johnson	Player	1952	Montreal Wanderers
Aurel Joliat	Player	1947	Montreal Canadiens
Edouard C. “Newsy” Lalonde	Player	1950	Montreal Canadiens
Duncan “Mickey” MacKay	Player	1952	Vancouver Millionaires
Joseph Malone	Player	1950	Quebec Bulldogs
Frank McGee	Player	1945	Ottawa Silver Seven
Howie Morenz	Player	1945	Montreal Canadiens
Francis Nelson	Builder	1947	OHA Governor to the Amateur Athletic Union of Canada
Frank Nighbor	Player	1947	Ottawa Senators
William Northey	Builder	1947	President of the Montreal Hockey Club, Montreal Forum
Lester Patrick	Player	1947	New York Rangers
Thomas Phillips	Player	1945	Kenora Thistles
Harvey Pulford	Player	1945	Ottawa Silver Seven
George T. Richardson	Player	1950	Queen's University
John Ross Robertson	Builder	1947	OHA President from 1899 to 1905
Claude C. Robinson	Builder	1947	Executive for the Winnipeg Victorias
Arthur H. Ross	Player	1949	Montreal Wanderers
Edward “Eddie” Shore	Player	1947	Boston Bruins
Lord Stanley (of Preston)	Builder	1945	Donated the Stanley Cup
William H. “Hod” Stuart	Player	1945	Montreal Wanderers
James T. Sutherland	Builder	1947	CAHA President 1919 OHA President 1915-1918
Fred “Cyclone” Taylor	Player	1947	Vancouver Millionaires
Harry Trihey	Player	1950	Montreal Shamrocks
Georges Vezina	Player	1945	Montreal Canadiens

^{†} Names appear in similar fashion to the way in which they are displayed at the International Hockey Hall of Fame.
