= 1905 CAHL season =

- League: Canadian Amateur Hockey League
- Sport: Ice hockey
- Duration: January 2 – March 11, 1905
- Teams: 6

1905
- Champions: Montreal Victorias
- Top scorer: Russell Bowie (27 goals)

CAHL seasons
- ← 1904 1906 (ECAHA) →

The 1905 Canadian Amateur Hockey League (CAHL) season was the seventh and final season of the league. Teams played a ten-game schedule. This year saw the addition of two teams, Montreal Westmount and Montreal Nationals. Montreal Nationals had previously been in the FAHL. Montreal Victorias won the league championship with a record of 9–1.

== League business ==
=== Executive ===
- Fred McRobie, Victorias (President)
- Harry Shaw, Montreal (Secretary-Treasurer)

At the league meeting, new franchises were granted to Montreal Westmount and Montreal Le National. Grand Trunk, Three Rivers and Montreal Wanderers were turned down. Ottawa representative J.P. Dickson attended the meeting to try to arrange a return to the league by Ottawa on condition that Wanderers were accepted also. This was turned down, partly because the league had decided to have exclusively amateur players.

== Pre-season ==
Quebec Hockey Club went to New York City in December 1904 for an exhibition series against tha amateur teams of New York at St. Nicholas Rink. Quebec lost to New York Wanderers 5-3 and defeated the New York Athletic Club 7-2.

== Regular season ==
=== Highlights ===
Montreal Hockey Club's captain, Archie Hooper died before the season of complications stemming from a February 1903 ice hockey game injury.

This season saw several impressive rookies including Art Ross for Montreal Westmount and Ernie Russell for Montreal. Lester and Frank Patrick played together for Montreal Westmount.

The league had a lot of scoring. The league leader, Russell Bowie of Victorias scored 27 goals in eight games. On January 7, Shamrocks and Westmount combined for 24 goals in a Shamrocks 14–10 win. On February 18, Fred Brophy, the Westmount goaltender, decided to get in on the act and rushed the length of the ice to score against Paddy Moran of Quebec.

Montreal Le National lost their first four games by a combined score of 6–42 and withdrew from the rest of the schedule, defaulting the rest of their matches.

Montreal Victorias won the season with a record of 9–1, but could not make a satisfactory arrangement with the Stanley Cup trustees and would not play in a challenge against Ottawa. The Victorias were granted a best-of-three series by the trustees, but declined, demanding a sudden-death game or two-game, total-goals series, which was not agreed to by the trustees.

=== Final standing ===
Team	Games Played	Wins	Losses	Ties	Goals For	Goals Against
Montreal Victorias	10	9	1	0	64	32
Quebec Hockey Club	10	8	2	0	78	45
Montreal Hockey Club	10	7	3	0	54	42
Montreal Shamrocks	10	3	7	0	41	62
Montreal Westmount	10	3	7	0	55	75
Montreal Le National	10	0	10†	0	6	42

† Le National defaulted their last six games.

== Schedule and results ==
Month	Day	Visitor	Score	Home	Score
Jan.	2	Montreal	9	Le National	1
Jan.	7	Shamrocks	14	Westmount	10
Jan.	7	Victorias	5	Quebec	3
Jan.	11	Montreal	6	Shamrocks	1
Jan.	14	Quebec	10	Westmount	9
Jan.	16	Le National	1	Shamrocks	8
Jan.	18	Victorias	8	Montreal	5
Jan.	21	Le National	2	Quebec	13
Jan.	21	Victorias	7	Shamrocks	2
Jan.	23	Westmount	12	Le National	2
Jan.	26	Quebec	4	Shamrocks	2
Jan.	28	Montreal	5	Westmount	4
Jan.	30†	Nationals		Victorias	
Feb.	1	Westmount	4	Victorias	9
Feb.	4	Montreal	3	Quebec	7
Feb.	4	Westmount	3	Shamrocks	2
Feb.	13†	Nationals		Westmount	
Feb.	18	Shamrocks	5	Montreal	7
Feb.	18	Westmount	5	Quebec	17
Feb.	22	Victorias	13	Shamrocks	4
Feb.	22†	Nationals		Montreal	
Feb.	25	Quebec	3	Victorias	8
Feb.	27†	Quebec		Nationals	
Feb.	27	Montreal	6	Victorias	3
Mar.	1†	Shamrocks		Nationals	
Mar.	4	Victorias	11	Westmount	5
Mar.	4	Shamrocks	3	Quebec	11
Mar.	6† (††)	Victorias		Nationals	
Mar.	8	Westmount	3	Montreal	5
Mar.	11	Quebec	10	Montreal	8

† Defaulted by Nationals

†† Victorias clinch league championship.

== Player statistics ==
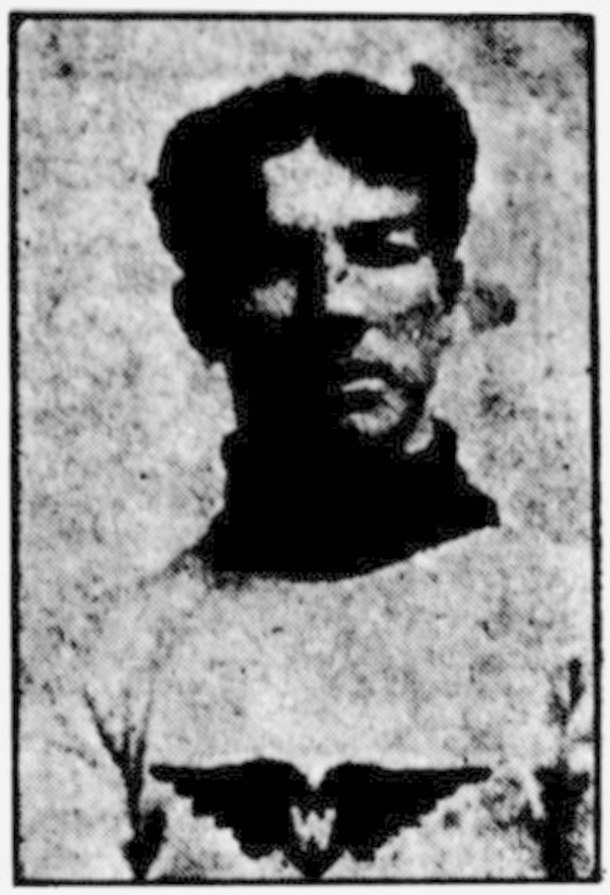
Art Ross with the Montreal Westmount.

=== Goaltending averages ===
Name	Club	GP	GA	SO	GAA
Nathan Frye	Victorias	8	32		4.0
Oliver Waugh	Montreal	9	42		4.7
Paddy Moran	Quebec	9	45		5.0
Mike Kenny	Shamrocks	9	62		6.9
Fred Brophy	Westmount	6	49		8.2
Edgar Darling	Westmount	3	26		8.7
Joseph Cattarinich	Le National	4	42		10.5

=== Scoring leaders ===
Name	Club	GP	G
Bowie, Russell	Victorias	8	27
Russel, Blair	Victorias	8	19
Power, Joe	Quebec	9	15
Foulis, Colin	Westmount	7	13
Russell, Ernie	Montreal	8	11
Ross, Art	Westmount	8	10
Hogan, Eddie	Quebec	9	10
Church, Tom	Westmount	9	9
Howard, Cavie	Victorias	8	9
Jordan, Herb	Quebec	8	9

== See also ==
- 1904–05 FAHL season
- Canadian Amateur Hockey League
- List of pre-NHL seasons
- List of ice hockey leagues

Preceded by 1904 CAHL season	CAHL seasons 1905	Succeeded by 1906 ECAHA season
