= Irish Rangers =

Irish Rangers may refer to:

- Irish Army Ranger Wing (ARW), the elite special operations forces of the Defence Forces of Ireland
- Royal Irish Rangers, former infantry regiment of the British Army (1968–2002)
- 102nd Regiment of Foot (Irish Rangers), former infantry regiment of the British Army, raised in 1794
- 199th (Duchess of Connaught's Own Irish Rangers) Battalion, CEF, unit in the Canadian Expeditionary Force during the First World War
- Irish Canadian Rangers, an infantry regiment of the Non-Permanent Active Militia of the Canadian Militia

== See also ==
- Irish regiment
