= Arthur Farrell =

Canadian ice hockey player

Art Farrell
- Hockey Hall of Fame, 1965
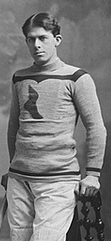
- Born: February 8, 1877 Montreal, Quebec, Canada
- Died: February 7, 1909 (aged 31) Sainte-Agathe-des-Monts, Quebec, Canada
- Position: Centre
- Played for: Montreal Shamrocks
- Playing career: 1896–1900

Arthur "Art" Farrell (February 8, 1877 – February 7, 1909) was a Canadian ice hockey player, author and businessman. Farrell played for St. Mary's College in the 1890s and later the Montreal Shamrocks in the Amateur Hockey Association of Canada (AHAC) and Canadian Amateur Hockey League (CAHL). Born in Montreal, Quebec, Farrell helped lead the Shamrocks to Stanley Cup victories in 1899 and 1900.

He wrote the first ever book on ice hockey, Hockey: Canada's Royal Winter Game, published in 1899 and of which only four remaining copies are known to exist in the world. He went on to write two "how-to" books on hockey: Ice hockey and ice polo guide of 1901-1904 and How to play Ice Hockey, published in 1907.

== Personal life ==
Farrell was born in Montreal, Quebec, the son of William Farrell and Mary Meagher. He was the fourth child of eight. His father was a successful businessman and Montreal alderman.

After leaving hockey in 1901, Farrell went into his father's business firm and wrote books on ice hockey, revising his 1899 book for the American market. Farrell fell ill with tuberculosis in 1906, and entered the sanatorium in Sainte-Agathe-des-Monts, where he died in 1909. He was inducted into the Hockey Hall of Fame in 1965, along with his teammate Fred Scanlan, as a player.

Farrell was one of the editors for the Spalding Athletic Library collection which was published by American Sports Publishing Co.

== Playing career ==
Farrell studied and played ice hockey at St. Mary's College from 1895 until 1896. While there, he met future Shamrocks' players Harry Trihey, Fred Scanlan and Jack Brannen. In 1897, the four joined the Montreal Shamrocks. Farrell, along with Trihey, Scanlan and Brannen would form an impressive offensive line for the Shamrocks. (In those days, four forwards played as a line, including a rover.) The Shamrocks would win their league championship and the Stanley Cup in 1899 and 1900. The group played one more season together with the Shamrocks, then all four (and in fact the entire team) left the Shamrocks and Farrell and Trihey left competitive play entirely. While still playing, Farrell served as referee in CAHL games, and he continued as a referee after he retired as a player.

=== Career statistics ===
			Regular season					Playoffs
Season	Team	League	GP	G	A	Pts	PIM	GP	G	A	Pts	PIM
1893–94	St. Mary's College	AHAC-J	—	—	—	—	—	—	—	—	—	—
1894–95	St. Mary's College	AHAC-J	—	—	—	—	—	—	—	—	—	—
1895–96	St. Mary's College	AHAC-J	—	—	—	—	—	—	—	—	—	—
1896–97	Montreal Shamrocks	AHAC	2	2	0	2	—	—	—	—	—	—
1897–98	Berlin H/C	OHA-I	2	6	0	6	—	—	—	—	—	—
1898–99	Montreal Shamrocks	CAHL	8	8	0	8	—	—	—	—	—	—
1898–99	Montreal Shamrocks	Stanley Cup	—	—	—	—	—	1	2	0	2	—
1899–1900	Montreal Shamrocks	CAHL	7	13	0	13	—	—	—	—	—	—
1899–1900	Montreal Shamrocks	Stanley Cup	—	—	—	—	—	5	10	0	10	—
1900–01	Montreal Shamrocks	CAHL	8	10	0	10	—	—	—	—	—	—
1900–01	Montreal Shamrocks	Stanley Cup	—	—	—	—	—	2	1	0	1	2
