= 1900 CAHL season =

Ice hockey season

- League: Canadian Amateur Hockey League
- Sport: Ice hockey
- Duration: January 6 – March 10, 1900
- Teams: 5

1900
- Champions: Montreal Shamrocks
- Top scorer: Harry Trihey (17 goals)

CAHL seasons
- ← 1899 1901 →

The 1900 Canadian Amateur Hockey League (CAHL) season was the second season of the league. Teams played an eight-game schedule. Again, the Montreal Shamrocks were the league champion with a record of seven wins and one loss.

== League business ==
=== Executive ===
- F. R. Baird (President)
- John Patrick Dickson (1st vice-president)
- H. E. Scott (2nd vice-president)
- George R. James (secretary-treasurer)
- Harry McLaughlin (councillor)

McGill University applied to join the league but was turned down.

The use of netting for the goal was demonstrated with a model produced by Frank Stocking, goaltender of the Quebec club at the annual meeting. After an exhibition game between the Shamrocks and Victorias, the use of goal nets was approved for league play, and used for the season. The netting connected the two upright posts, but there was no crossbar across the top.

The use of hockey gloves was quite common and shin guards were now mostly in use inside the stockings though some players still used the old style outside the stockings.

== Season ==
Star rover Graham Drinkwater retired from the Victorias before the season.

=== Highlights ===
The Shamrocks won the championship losing only one game, and that, after the league championship was decided. This was the second year in a row for the Shamrocks, who were a mediocre team before this stretch of success and would return to it the next year.

=== Final standing ===
Note GP = Games Played, W = Wins, L = Losses, T = Ties, GF = Goals For, GA = Goals Against

Team	GP	W	L	T	GF	GA
Montreal Shamrocks	8	7	1	0	49	26
Montreal Hockey Club	8	5	3	0	34	36
Ottawa Hockey Club	8	4	4	0	28	19
Montreal Victorias	8	2	6	0	44	55
Quebec Hockey Club	8	2	6	0	33	52

=== Results ===
Month	Day	Visitor	Score	Home	Score
Jan.	6	Montreal HC	6	Victorias	5
Jan.	6	Shamrocks	5	Ottawa HC	4
Jan.	13	Montreal HC	3	Shamrocks	8
Jan.	13	Ottawa HC	3	Quebec HC	2
Jan.	18	Victorias	4	Shamrocks	10
Jan.	20	Montreal HC	2	Ottawa HC	5
Jan.	20	Quebec HC	3	Victorias	14
Jan.	27	Montreal HC	8	Quebec HC	7
Jan.	27	Ottawa HC	5	Victorias	3
Feb.	3	Quebec HC	2	Shamrocks	8
Feb.	10	Victorias	1	Ottawa HC	11
Feb.	10	Quebec HC	5	Montreal HC	6
Feb.	17	Ottawa HC	0	Montreal HC	3
Feb.	24	Quebec HC	3	Ottawa HC	0
Feb.	24	Victorias	1	Montreal HC	3
Feb.	27	Shamrocks	5	Montreal HC	3
Mar.	1 (†)	Shamrocks	10	Victorias	6
Mar.	3 (‡)	Ottawa HC		Shamrocks	
Mar.	4	Victorias	10	Quebec HC	7
Mar.	10	Shamrocks	3	Quebec HC	4

† Shamrocks clinch league championship.

‡ defaulted to Shamrocks

== Player Stats ==
=== Scoring leaders ===
Note: GP = Games played, G = Goals scored

Name	Club	GP	G
Harry Trihey	Shamrocks	7	17
Russell Bowie	Victorias	7	15
Billy Christmas	Montreal HC	8	12
Bruce Stuart	Ottawa HC	5	11
James Gillespie	Quebec HC	8	10
Arthur Farrell	Shamrocks	8	9
Blair Russel	Victorias	7	9
George McCarron	Quebec HC	2	7
Charlie Liffiton	Montreal HC	8	6
Jack Brannen	Shamrocks	8	6

=== Goaltending averages ===
Note: GP = Games played, GA = Goals against, SO = Shutouts, GAA = Goals against average

Name	Club	GP	GA	SO	GAA
Billy Nicholson	Montreal HC	4	11	1	2.75
Bouse Hutton	Ottawa HC	7	19	0	2.8
James H. McKenna	Shamrocks	7	26	0	3.7
Fred Munro	Montreal HC	4	25	0	6.3
Frank Stocking	Quebec HC	8	52	1	6.5
Thomas Powers	Victorias	8	55	0	6.9

== Stanley Cup challenges ==
=== Shamrocks vs. Winnipeg ===
The MHA's Winnipeg Victorias issued another challenge for the Cup. This time, a best-of-three series was played against the defending champion Montreal Shamrocks. Winnipeg won the first game, 4–3, but Montreal prevailed in the next two games, 3–2 and 5–4.

Date	Winning Team	Score	Losing Team	Location
February 12, 1900	Winnipeg Victorias	4–3	Montreal Shamrocks	Montreal Arena
February 14, 1900	Montreal Shamrocks	3–2	Winnipeg Victorias	Montreal Arena
February 16, 1900	Montreal Shamrocks	5–4	Winnipeg Victorias	Montreal Arena
Montreal wins best-of-three series 2 games to 1

February 12, 1900
Winnipeg	4		Shamrocks	3
George Merritt		G	James H. McKenna	
Rod Flett		P	Frank Tansey	
Charles Johnstone		CP	Frank Wall	
Tony Gingras	1	F	Arthur Farrell	
Dan Bain, Capt	2	F	Jack P. Brannen	
William N. Roxburgh	1	F	Harry Trihey, Capt	2
Colin "Tote" Campbell		F	Fred Scanlan	1
Referee – H. Baird; Umpires – Clarence McKerrow, F. Stocking

February 14, 1900
Winnipeg	2		Shamrocks	3
George Merritt		G	James H. McKenna	
Rod Flett		P	Frank Tansey	
Charles Johnstone	1	CP	Frank Wall	
Tony Gingras		F	Arthur Farrell	
Dan Bain, Capt		F	Jack P. Brannen	1
William N. Roxburgh		F	Harry Trihey, Capt	2
Colin "Tote" Campbell	1	F	Fred Scanlan	
Referee – H. Baird; Umpires – Clarence McKerrow, Billy Christmas

February 16, 1900
Winnipeg	4		Shamrocks	5
George Merritt		G	James H. McKenna	
Rod Flett		P	Frank Tansey	
Charles Johnstone		CP	Frank Wall	
Tony Gingras	1	F	Arthur Farrell	2
Dan Bain, Capt	2	F	Jack P. Brannen	
William N. Roxburgh	1	F	Harry Trihey, Capt	3
Colin "Tote" Campbell		F	Fred Scanlan	
Referee – H. Baird

=== Shamrocks vs. Halifax ===
In March, the Shamrocks then received another challenge for the Cup. However, the Halifax Crescents of the Halifax City Hockey League did not pose much of a threat as Montreal crushed them, 10–2 and 11–0.

Date	Winning Team	Score	Losing Team	Location
March 5, 1900	Montreal Shamrocks	10–2	Halifax Crescents	Montreal Arena
March 7, 1900	Montreal Shamrocks	11–0	Halifax Crescents	Montreal Arena
Montreal wins best-of-three series 2 games to 0

March 5, 1900
Halifax	2		Shamrocks	10
Fred Bishop		G	James H. McKenna	
Alfred Kane		P	Frank Tansey Capt.	
Tom Mullane, Capt.		CP	Frank Wall	3
Joe Crockett	1	F	Arthur Farrell	4
Art Ryan		F	Jack P. Brannen	1
Fred Maher	1	F	Harry Trihey	2
Alex McInnes		F	Fred Scanlan	
Referee – H. Baird

March 7, 1900
Halifax	0		Shamrocks	11
Fred Bishop		G	James H. McKenna	
Alfred Kane		P	Frank Tansey Capt.	
Tom Mullane, Capt.		CP	Frank Wall	1
Joe Crockett		F	Arthur Farrell	4
Art Ryan		F	Jack P. Brannen	2
Fred Maher		F	Harry Trihey	3
Alex McInnis		F	Fred Scanlan	1
Referee – H. Baird

== Stanley Cup engraving ==
1900 Montreal Shamrocks
Players
Forwards
Jack P. Brannen (rover)
Arthur Farrell (centre)
Fred Scanlan (left wing)
Harry Trihey (centre/right wing – captain)
Charles Hoerner †
Defencemen
Frank Tansey (point)
Fred Wall (cover point)
John Brennon †
Goaltender
James H. McKenna

- † Did not play-on team picture
- & unknown first name

non-players=

- Harry W. McLaughlin (president), C.M. Hart (vice-president)
- W.H. Kearney (director)&, C.F. Smith (director)
- Barney Dunphy (Coach/Trainer), C. Foley (Ass't trainer)

== See also ==
- List of Stanley Cup champions
- Canadian Amateur Hockey League

Preceded by Montreal Shamrocks; Mar. 1899	Montreal Shamrocks; Stanley Cup Champions; 1900	Succeeded by Winnipeg Victorias; Jan. 1901
Preceded by 1899 CAHL season	CAHL seasons 1900	Succeeded by 1901 CAHL season
