= 1904 CAHL season =

Ice hockey season

- League: Canadian Amateur Hockey League
- Sport: Ice hockey
- Duration: January 2 – February 24, 1904
- Teams: 5

1904
- Champions: Quebec Hockey Club
- Top scorer: Russell Bowie (27 goals)

CAHL seasons
- ← 1903 1905 →

The 1904 Canadian Amateur Hockey League (CAHL) season was the sixth season of the league. Teams played an eight-game schedule. This was a tumultuous year as Ottawa resigned in February and defaulted four games. The Quebec Hockey Club placed first to take the championship. Quebec did not play for the Stanley Cup.

Also, prior to the start of the season a rival hockey league, the Federal Amateur Hockey League was started, with the Montreal Wanderers taking most of the 'Little Men of Iron' from the Montreal Hockey Club.

== League business ==
=== Executive ===
- Harry Trihey, Shamrocks (President)
- F. Stocking, Quebec (1st Vice-President)
- J. P. Dickson ( 2nd Vice-President)
- Fred McRobie, Montreal (Secretary-Treasurer)

As the Wanderers had signed players from Montreal, it was forbidden for teams to play games against FAHL teams, and for team officials to participate in FAHL activities.

== Season ==
=== Highlights ===
This season saw several impressive rookies including Frank Patrick for Montreal Victorias, Ernie (Moose) Johnson for Montreal and Alf Smith and Jim McGee for Ottawa.

The season started out with Ottawa winning their first four games. However, in their third game against the Victorias, the Ottawa team arrived 1½ hours late. The game was called at midnight, with Ottawa ahead 4–1. After a game where the Shamrocks arrived late in Ottawa, the League levied fines against the Shamrocks and Ottawa, and ordered the Ottawa-Victorias game to be replayed. Despite a threat from Mr. Dickson of Ottawa that Ottawa would resign if the game was to be replayed, the League continued to demand that the game be played. The Ottawa club offered to play it if it had a bearing on the league championship, but this was not acceptable to the league. In the end, Ottawa resigned from the league and the league considered the final four games to be forfeits. This overshadowed a great season from Quebec, which won the CAHL season with a record of 5–1 (plus two wins by forfeit).

=== Final standings ===
Team	Games Played	Wins	Losses	Ties	Goals For	Goals Against
Quebec Hockey Club	6	5	1	0	50	37
Montreal Victorias	8	5	3	0	75	48
Montreal Hockey Club	7	2	5	0	34	49
Montreal Shamrocks	7	0	7	0	32	74
Ottawa Hockey Club^{‡}	4	4	0	0	32	15

^{‡} Resigned from league.

== Stanley Cup challenges ==
Ottawa would leave the CAHL in mid-season, leaving Quebec to win the league. The Stanley Cup did not pass to the Quebec Bulldogs based on their league championship. The Cup trustees decided that the Cup went with Ottawa. Quebec refused to make a challenge for the Stanley Cup, arguing that the Cup belonged to the CAHL season winner.

=== Winnipeg vs. Ottawa ===
Before they resigned from the CAHL, Ottawa HC defended the Cup against the Winnipeg Rowing Club in a best two-of-three series played in Ottawa 9–1,2–6,2–0 (2–1).

Date	Winning Team	Score	Losing Team	Location
December 30, 1903	Ottawa HC	9–1	Winnipeg Rowing Club	Aberdeen Pavilion, Ottawa
January 1, 1904	Winnipeg Rowing Club	6–2	Ottawa HC	Aberdeen Pavilion, Ottawa
January 4, 1904	Ottawa HC	2–0	Winnipeg Rowing Club	Aberdeen Pavilion, Ottawa
Ottawa wins best-of-three series 2 games to 1

December 30, 1903
Ottawa (9)			Winnipeg (1)	
Player	G	Pos	Player	G
John "Bouse" Hutton		G	Art Brown	
Harvey Pulford, Capt		P	Percy E. Brown	
Arthur Moore		CP	S. Crawford Richards	
Harry Westwick	4	RO	Joe Hall	
Frank McGee	3	C	Billy Breen, Capt	
Suddy Gilmour	1	LW	Billy Bawlf	1
Alf Smith	1	RW	Clint E. Bennest	
Jim McGee		sub	Claude Borland	
Billy Gilmour		sub	Harry Kirby	
Referee – Harry Trihey; Umpires – William A. Northey, C. J. Hanratty

Source: Montreal Gazette

January 1, 1904
Ottawa (2)			Winnipeg (6)	
Player	G	Pos	Player	G
John "Bouse" Hutton		G	Art Brown	
Harvey Pulford, Capt		P	Percy E. Brown	
Arthur Moore		CP	Eric Hamber	
Harry Westwick	1	RO	Joe Hall	1
Frank McGee		C	Billy Breen, Capt	2
Suddy Gilmour		LW	Billy Bawlf	2
Alf Smith	1	RW	Claude Borland	1
Referee – Harry Trihey; Umpires – M. J. McCrory, C. J. Hanratty

Source: Montreal Gazette

January 4, 1904
Ottawa (2)			Winnipeg (0)	
Player	G	Pos	Player	G
John "Bouse" Hutton		G	Art Brown	
Harvey Pulford, Capt		P	Percy E. Brown	
Arthur Moore		CP	Eric Hamber	
Harry Westwick		RO	Joe Hall	
Frank McGee	1	C	William Breen, Capt	
Suddy Gilmour	1	LW	Billy Bawlf	
Billy Gilmour		RW	Claude Borland	
Referee – Harry Trihey; Umpires – M. J. McCrory, C. J. Hanratty

Source: Montreal Gazette

== Exhibitions ==
After the season, the Montreal Victorias travelled to New York city, to play against Brooklyn Crescents and the New York Wanderers. The Victorias tied Brooklyn 8–8 and lost to the Wanderers 6–4.

== Schedule and results ==
Month	Day	Visitor	Score	Home	Score
Jan.	2	Victorias	18	Shamrocks	2
Jan.	2	Montreal	3	Quebec	9
Jan.	9	Victorias	6	Ottawa	10
Jan.	9	Quebec	13	Shamrocks	5
Jan.	16	Ottawa	8	Montreal	3
Jan.	16	Victorias	12	Quebec	5
Jan.	20	Shamrocks	3	Montreal	8
Jan.	23	Victorias	8	Montreal	5
Jan.	30	Shamrocks	6	Quebec	8
Jan.	30†	Ottawa	4	Victorias	1
Feb.	6	Quebec	6	Montreal	4
Feb.	6	Shamrocks	5	Ottawa	10
Feb.	13	Victorias	12	Shamrocks	7
Feb.	17	Montreal	5	Shamrocks	4
Feb.	20 (††)	Quebec	9	Victorias	7
Feb.	24	Montreal	6	Victorias	11
Feb.	–	Montreal		Ottawa	
Feb.	–	Ottawa		Shamrocks	
Feb.	–	Quebec		Ottawa	
Feb.	–	Ottawa		Quebec	

† Ordered to be replayed but never replayed as Ottawa resigned from league.

†† Quebec clinches league championship.

== Player statistics ==
=== Goaltending averages ===
Note: GP = Games played, GA = Goals against, SO = Shutouts, GAA = Goals against average

Name	Club	GP	GA	SO	GAA
Hutton, John Bouse	Ottawa	4	15		3.8
Nichol, Jim	Victorias	8	48		6.0
Moran, Paddy	Quebec	6	37		6.2
Waugh, Oliver	Montreal	5	32		6.4
Brophy, Fred	Montreal	1	8		8.0
Mike Kenny	Shamrocks	4	35		8.8
S. Price	Montreal	1	9		9.0
James Cloran	Shamrocks	3	39		13.0

=== Scoring leaders ===
Note: GP = Game played, G = Goals scored

Name	Club	GP	G
Bowie, Russell	Victorias	8	27
Jordan, Herb	Quebec	6	19
Russell, Blair	Victorias	8	17
Howard, Cavie	Victorias	6	16
McGee, Frank	Ottawa	4	12
Sargent, Grover	Montreal	6	11
Power, Joe	Quebec	6	10
Coulson, Herbert	Montreal	6	8
Smith, Alf	Ottawa	4	8
Foulis, Colin	Shamrocks	6	7

== Stanley Cup engraving ==
The following Ottawa Hockey Club players and staff were members of the Stanley Cup winning team.

1904 Ottawa Hockey Club aka "Silver Seven"

=== Players ===
Forwards

- Frank McGee(center-rover)
- Alf Smith (right wing-cover point-Playing-Coach)
- Hamilton Billy Gilmour (right wing)
- Sutherland Suddy Gilmour (left wing)
- Harry Westwick (rover)
- Scott&

Defencemen

- Harvey Pulford (point-Captain)
- Jim McGee (point-cover point)
- Arthur Moore(cover point)

Goaltenders

- John "Bouse" Hutton

=== Coaching and administrative staff ===
- Percy M. Butler (President), Robert T. "Bob" Shillington (manager)
- Patrick Baskerville (treasurer), Thomas D'Arcy McGee (secretary)
- Halder Kirby (club doctor), Llewellyn Bates (Vice President)
- Chauncy Kirby, Martin Rosenthal, Charles Sparks (directors)
- Mac McGilton (Ass't Trainer), Pete Green (trainer)
- No official team picture has been found for the 1904 Ottawa

=== Stanley Cup engraving ===
Cyclone Taylor scratched 'Fred W. Taylor' over the official engraving of 'OTTAWA 1904/Ottawa vs Wanderers'.

- &unknown first name.

=== Montreal Wanderers vs. Ottawa ===
A two-game series between the Montreal Wanderers from the FAHL and Ottawa from the CAHL was arranged for the Stanley Cup. The teams played the first game in Montreal to a 5–5 tie. Montreal refused to play overtime, demanding that the game be considered a no-contest and proposed that the series start over as a best two-of-three series. The Cup trustees demanded that the series continue as scheduled, and the Wanderers abandoned the challenge.

Date	Winning Team	Score	Losing Team	Location
March 2, 1904	Ended in a 5–5 tie			Montreal Arena
Ottawa wins series; Montreal is disqualified for refusing to play the second game in Ottawa.

According to the Gazette, the game saw "the dirtiest game ever seen between two senior teams at the Arena." Thirty-six penalties were called. Thomas Leahy was injured and replaced by Ken Mallen. James Strachan, president of the Wanderers, was quoted as saying that the Wanderers would not go to Ottawa and play with Dr. Kearns as referee. Ottawa took a 2–0 lead before the Wanderers scored five in a row. The Ottawas came back with three, the final goal by Frank McGee.

March 2, 1904
Ottawa (5)			Montreal (5)	
Player	G	Pos	Player	G
John "Bouse" Hutton		G	Billy Nicholson	
Jim McGee		P	Billy Strachan	
Alf Smith		CP	Billy Bellingham	
Harry Westwick	2	R	Thomas Leahy, Ken Mallen	1; 1
Frank McGee	1	C	Jack Marshall	1
Billy Gilmour	1	RW	Jimmy Gardner	1
Suddy Gilmour	1	LW	Cecil Blatchford	1
Referee - Dr. Kearns; Umpires - Stevens, Baskerville

Source: Montreal Gazette

The Wanderers demanded a replay of the game to be held in Montreal, which Ottawa refused. The series was cancelled, with Ottawa retained the Stanley Cup championship. Ottawa then joined FAHL in the offseason. | |}

=== Brandon Wheat City vs. Ottawa ===
Brandon Wheat City Hockey Club, the Manitoba League champion, challenged for the Cup in a best-of-three series. It was scheduled only days after the Montreal Wanderers challenge (Coleman page. 98–99)

Date	Winning Team	Score	Losing Team	Location
March 9, 1904	Ottawa	6–3	Brandon	Dey's Arena
March 11, 1904	Ottawa	9–3	Brandon	Dey's Arena
Ottawa HC wins best-of-three series two games to none Source: (Coleman page 98–99)

March 9, 1904
Brandon 3			Ottawa 6	
Player	G	Pos	Player	G
Doug "Dutchie" Morrison		G	John "Bouse" Hutton	
Lester Patrick		P	Harvey Pulford, Capt.	
Lorne Hannay, Coach	2	CP	Jim McGee	
George Smith		R	Harry Westwick	
Jackie Brodie, Capt.	1	C	Frank McGee	5
Lorne Laidlaw		RW	Alf Smith	1
Harry Bright	1	LW	Suddy Gilmour	
Referee - Dr. Kearns; Umpires - Stevens, Baskerville

- Spare - Brandon - Robert Cross (Captain), William Hopper, Sam G. Lowes, Harold Deeton, Frank "Dad" Wheelan
- Spares - Ottawa - Billy Gilmour - RW, Arthur Moore - D. (Coleman page 98–99).
- Referee F. Chittick - Umpirers Senator Watson, William Foran

March 11, 1904
Brandon 3			Ottawa 9	
Player	G	Pos	Player	G
Doug "Dutchie" Morrison		G	John "Bouse" Hutton	
Lester Patrick		P	Harvey Pulford, Capt.	
Lorne Hannay, Coach		CP	Jim McGee	
George Smith	1	R	Harry Westwick	1
Jackie Brodie, Capt.	1	C	Frank McGee	3
Lorne Laidlaw	1	RW	Alf Smith	4
Harry Bright	1	LW	Suddy Gilmour	1
Referee - Dr. Kearns; Umpires - Stevens, Baskerville

- Spare - Brandon - Robert Cross (Captain), William Hopper, S.G Lowe, H. Breton, F. Wheelan
- Spares - Ottawa - Billy Gilmour - RW, Arthur Moore - D
- Referee F. Chittick - Umpirers Senator Watson, William Foran

== See also ==
- 1904 FAHL season
- 1904–05 FAHL season - Stanley Cup Champions Ottawa Silver Sevens
- List of Stanley Cup champions

Preceded by Ottawa Hockey Club; 1904	Ottawa Hockey Club; Stanley Cup Champions; 1904	Succeeded by Ottawa Hockey Club; January, 1905
Preceded by 1903 CAHL season	CAHL seasons 1904	Succeeded by 1904–05 FAHL season
