= 1901 CAHL season =

- League: Canadian Amateur Hockey League
- Sport: Ice hockey
- Duration: January 5 – March 5, 1901
- Teams: 5

1901
- Champions: Ottawa Hockey Club
- Top scorer: Russell Bowie (24 goals)

CAHL seasons
- ← 1900 1902 →

The 1901 Canadian Amateur Hockey League (CAHL) season was the third season of the senior ice hockey league. Teams played an eight-game schedule. The Ottawa Hockey Club was the league champion with a record of seven wins, no losses and a draw. The Montreal Shamrocks lost a Stanley Cup challenge during the season, so Ottawa did not inherit the Stanley Cup. The Club declined to challenge Winnipeg after the season.

== League business ==
=== Executive ===
- George R. James, Montreal (President)
- D. Watson, Quebec (1st vice-president)
- J. W. Smith, Ottawa ( 2nd vice-president)
- J. Stafford Bishop, Victorias (Secretary-Treasurer)
- C. Hart (Councillor)

The league adopted travelling expenses of $85 between Ottawa-Montreal, $100 between Montreal-Quebec and $125 between Ottawa-Quebec for the visiting teams to receive from the home team.

The league banned member teams from playing exhibition matches outside the league without league permission.

== Regular season ==
=== Highlights ===
The Ottawa club would win the season, undefeated, with players Sixsmith, Westwick and Pulford starring.

=== Final standing ===
Note GP = Games Played, W = Wins, L = Losses, T = Ties, GF = Goals For, GA = Goals Against

Team	GP	W	L	T	GF	GA
Ottawa Hockey Club	8	7	0	1	33	20
Montreal Victorias	8	4	3	1	45	32
Montreal Shamrocks	8	4	4	0	30	25
Montreal Hockey Club	8	3	5	0	28	37
Quebec Hockey Club	8	1	7	0	21	43

Although Ottawa won the league championship, the Shamrocks had lost their challenge to Winnipeg and Ottawa would not be awarded the Cup. At first, Ottawa was intending to challenge Winnipeg for the Cup, but on February 27, 1901, announced that they would not do so that winter. According to Coleman(1966), Ottawa did not issue a challenge due to the "lateness of the season." The Ottawa Journal as reported in The Globe suggested that the Ottawa club was wise in their decision, as they were in "racked condition in which they are, as a result of the immensely hard exertions put forth by them in all their games this season". The Ottawa Hockey Club did not challenge the following season, either.

=== Results ===
Month	Day	Visitor	Score	Home	Score
Jan.	5	Quebec HC	4	Ottawa HC	5
Jan.	5	Montreal HC	2	Victorias	3
Jan.	12	Ottawa HC	4	Shamrocks	2
Jan.	16	Shamrocks	3	Montreal HC	2
Jan.	19	Victorias	2	Ottawa HC	2 (OT 10')
Jan.	19	Quebec HC	4	Shamrocks	10
Jan.	21	Montreal HC	7	Quebec HC	3
Jan.	23	Victorias	4	Shamrocks	3
Jan.	26	Ottawa HC	9	Montreal HC	4
Feb.	2	Victorias	5	Quebec HC	6
Feb.	2	Montreal HC	3	Ottawa HC	5
Feb.	9	Shamrocks	2	Quebec HC	1
Feb.	9	Ottawa HC	5	Victorias	4
Feb.	16	Quebec HC	0	Montreal HC	4
Feb.	16 (†)	Shamrocks	1	Ottawa HC	2 (OT 30')
Feb.	20	Victorias	13	Montreal HC	3
Feb.	23	Ottawa HC	1	Quebec HC	0 (OT 20')
Feb.	23	Montreal HC	3	Shamrocks	1
Feb.	27	Shamrocks	8	Victorias	5
Mar.	2	Quebec HC	3	Victorias	9

† Ottawa clinches league championship.

== Player Stats ==
=== Scoring leaders ===
Note: GP = Games played, G = Goals scored

Name	Club	GP	G
Russell Bowie	Victorias	7	24
Lorne Campbell	Montreal HC	7	10
Arthur Farrell	Shamrocks	8	10
Harold Henry	Ottawa HC	8	8
Blair Russel	Victorias	8	8
Arthur Sixsmith	Ottawa HC	7	7
Harry Trihey	Shamrocks	7	7
Charlie Liffiton	Montreal HC	8	6
Harry Westwick	Ottawa HC	7	6
Edward Stuart	Victorias	5	6
Jack Smith	Ottawa HC	4	6

=== Goaltending averages ===
Note: GP = Games played, GA = Goals against, SO = Shutouts, GAA = Goals against average

Name	Club	GP	GA	SO	GAA
Fred Chittick	Ottawa HC	1	0	1	0.0
Archie Lockerby	Victorias	1	2		2.0
John Bouse Hutton	Ottawa HC	7	20		2.9
James H. McKenna	Shamrocks	8	25		3.1
Mark O'Meara	Quebec HC	1	4		4.0
Fred Munro	Victorias	7	30		4.3
Billy Nicholson	Montreal HC	8	37		4.6
Frank Stocking	Quebec HC	7	38		5.4

=== Exhibition games ===
On January 12, the Montreal Victorias played an exhibition against the New York Hockey Club, in New York, losing 2–1.

== Stanley Cup challenges ==
=== Shamrocks vs. Winnipeg ===
In January 1901, the Winnipeg Victorias of the MHA again challenged the Montreal Shamrocks for the Cup. This time, Winnipeg prevailed, sweeping the best-of-three series with scores of 4–3 and 2–1. Game two was the first overtime game in Cup history with Dan Bain scoring at the four-minute mark of the extra period.

Date	Winning Team	Score	Losing Team	Location
January 29, 1901	Winnipeg Victorias	4–3	Montreal Shamrocks	Montreal Arena
January 31, 1901	Winnipeg Victorias	2–1 (OT 4')	Montreal Shamrocks	Montreal Arena
Winnipeg wins best-of-three series 2 games to 0

January 29, 1901
Winnipeg	4		Shamrocks	3
Art Brown		G	James H. McKenna	
Rod Flett		P	Mike Grant	
Magnus Flett		CP	Frank Wall	1
Tony Gingras	1	F	Harry Trihey	
Dan Bain	1	F	Jack P. Brannen	1
Charles Johnston		F	Fred Scanlan	
Burke Wood	2	F	Arthur Farrell	1
Fred Chadham		sub		
Referee – H. Baird; Umpires – A. McKerrow, Dickie Boon

January 31, 1901
Winnipeg	2		Shamrocks	1
Art Brown		G	James H. McKenna	
Rod Flett		P	Mike Grant	
Magnus Flett		CP	Frank Wall	
Tony Gingras		F	Harry Trihey	1
Dan Bain	2	F	Jack P. Brannen	
Charles Johnston		F	Fred Scanlan	
Burke Wood		F	Arthur Farrell	
Fred Chadham		sub		
Referee – H. Baird; Umpires – A. McKerrow, Dickie Boon

== See also ==
- 1900–01 MHA season
- List of Stanley Cup champions

Preceded by 1900 CAHL season	CAHL seasons 1901	Succeeded by 1902 CAHL season
