= Russell Bowie =

Canadian ice hockey player (1880–1959)

- Hockey Hall of Fame, 1947
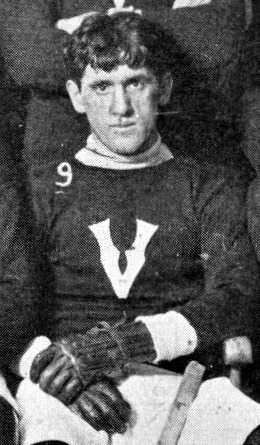
- Bowie c. 1905
- Born: August 24, 1880 Montreal, Quebec, Canada
- Died: April 8, 1959 (aged 78) Montreal, Quebec, Canada
- Position: Rover/Forward
- Shot: Right
- Played for: Montreal Victorias
- Playing career: 1896–1908

Russell George Alexander "Dubbie" Bowie (August 24, 1880 – April 8, 1959) was a Canadian ice hockey player. He was generally regarded as one of the best players of the pre-NHL era of the sport, and was inducted into the Hockey Hall of Fame in 1947. A staunch amateur, he retired from playing in 1909 when all major hockey leagues turned professional, though he continued as an on-ice official until an injury forced his retirement. In nine seasons of competitive play, he led his league in goal scoring five times.

== Playing career ==
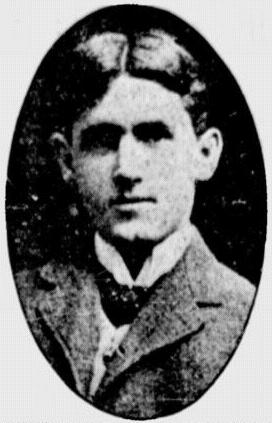
Bowie c. 1910

Bowie played centre and rover for numerous amateur Montreal teams in the 1890s. His senior debut came in 1899 with the Montreal Victorias, who were playing in the Canadian Amateur Hockey League (CAHL). He would finish with 11 goals in 7 league games, the third best in the league. He also played for the Victorias when they won the Stanley Cup for the final time, in 1898, recording one goal in two challenge games.

On February 20, 1901, Bowie scored seven goals in a game for the Victorias and was well positioned to dominate the CAHL, and two weeks later, he scored 6 goals against the Montreal Shamrocks. He finished the season with 24 goals, 14 more than his nearest rival.

In the 1903 season Bowie led the CAHL in scoring with 22 goals in 7 games. He repeated as CAHL scoring leader in 1904 with 27 goals in 8 games. His 26 goals in 8 games led the CAHL for a third year in a row in 1905. The CAHL was replaced by the Eastern Canada Amateur Hockey Association for 1906, and during the season Bowie missed one game and finished second in scoring with 30 goals in 9 games, one behind leader Harry Smith. He placed second again in 1907 with 38 goals in 10 games.

Over his career, Bowie would average almost three goals per game, a mark only matched by Frank McGee in major senior play. He again led the league in scoring in 1903, with 22 goals in 7 games, 8 ahead of McGee.

Bowie never accepted money to play hockey, famously refusing all importuning and turning down large offers, and was quoted as saying, "I am an amateur, was an amateur, and will die an amateur." He weathered a scandal in 1907 where it was alleged that he had taken pay from the professional Montreal Wanderers club, but the allegations were proven false—although the Wanderers did send him a grand piano in anticipation of Bowie's acceptance of their offer, an inducement he refused to receive. He did play against professionals in the ECAHA and International Hockey League.

Bowie retired from major play in 1909 — along with Harvey Pulford, Harry Westwick and Alf Smith, one of the final players who had played in the 19th century — when the professional National Hockey Association formed and the Victorias no longer played at a top level. Bowie led his league in scoring five times during his career: in 1901, 1903, 1904, 1905, and 1908.

He played in ten games for the Victorias in the next two seasons in lower level amateur competition, but his retirement was punctuated by an injury in 1910, when he broke his collarbone. He became a referee in retirement, officiating for the NHA thereafter. He was inducted into the Hockey Hall of Fame in 1947.

== Career statistics ==
=== Regular season and playoffs ===
			Regular season					Playoffs
Season	Team	League	GP	G	A	Pts	PIM	GP	G	A	Pts	PIM
1898–99	Montreal Victorias	CAHL	7	11	0	11	—	—	—	—	—	—
1898–99	Montreal Victorias	St-Cup	—	—	—	—	—	2	1	0	1	—
1899–1900	Montreal Victorias	CAHL	7	15	0	15	—	—	—	—	—	—
1900–01	Montreal Victorias	CAHL	7	24	0	24	—	—	—	—	—	—
1901–02	Montreal Victorias	CAHL	7	13	0	13	—	—	—	—	—	—
1902–03	Montreal Victorias	CAHL	7	22	0	22	—	2	0	0	0	3
1903–04	Montreal Victorias	CAHL	8	27	0	27	—	—	—	—	—	—
1904–05	Montreal Victorias	CAHL	8	27	0	27	—	—	—	—	—	—
1905–06	Montreal Victorias	ECAHA	9	30	0	30	8	—	—	—	—	—
1906–07	Montreal Victorias	ECAHA	10	39	0	39	13	—	—	—	—	—
1907–08	Montreal Victorias	ECAHA	10	31	0	31	19	—	—	—	—	—
1908–09	Montreal Victorias	IPAHU	5	21	0	21	19	—	—	—	—	—
1909–10	Montreal Victorias	IPAHU	3	6	0	6	—	2	5	0	5	8
CAHL totals			51	139	0	139	—	4	1	0	1	3
ECAHA totals			29	100	0	100	40	—	—	—	—	—

== Bibliography ==
- Coleman, Charles L. (1964), The Trail of the Stanley Cup, Volume 1: 1893–1926 inc., Dubuque, Iowa: Kendall/Hunt Publishing, ISBN 0-8403-2941-5
- Hockey Hall of Fame (2003), Honoured Members, Bolton, Ontario: Fenn Publishing, ISBN 1-55168-239-7
