= Fred McRobie =

Canadian ice hockey player

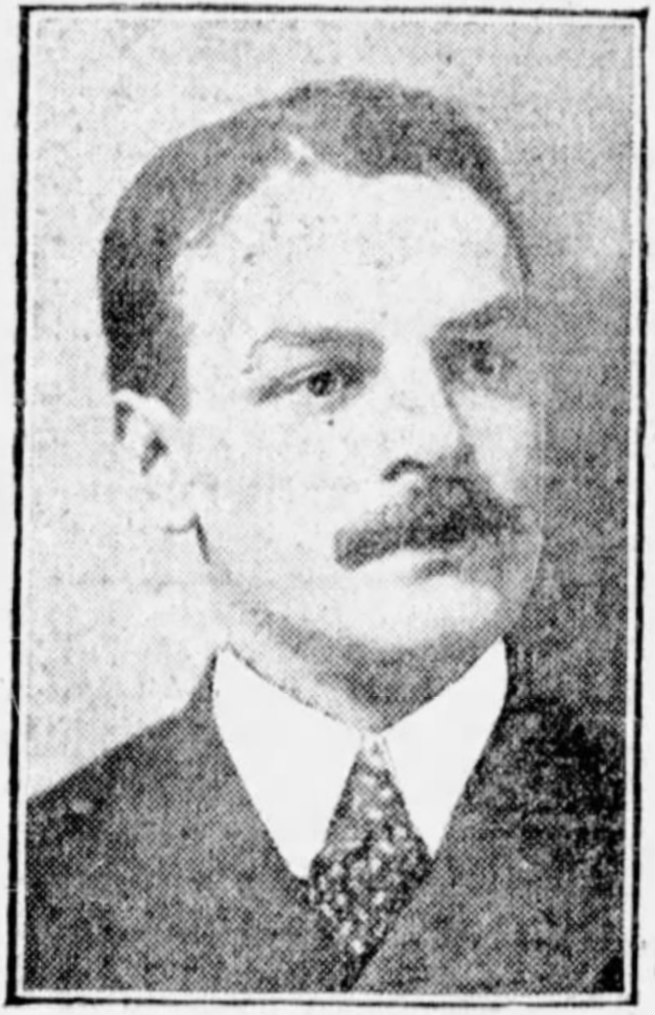
- McRobie c. 1903
- Born: April 9, 1875 Montreal, Quebec, Canada
- Died: November 1, 1961 (aged 86) Montreal, Quebec, Canada
- Height: 6 ft 0 in (183 cm)
- Weight: 170 lb (77 kg; 12 st 2 lb)
- Position: Defence
- Played for: Montreal Victorias
- Playing career: 1898–1902

Frederick Mackenzie McRobie (April 9, 1875 – November 1, 1961) was a Canadian amateur ice hockey player for the Montreal Victorias in the 1890s, playing defense. He won the Stanley Cup with the Victorias in 1899.

McRobie also worked as an ice hockey league executive, first as a secretary-treasurer and honorary president of the Canadian Amateur Hockey League and then, for the 1907 season, as the president of the Eastern Canada Amateur Hockey Association.
