= Saint John Mohawks =

Defunct Canadian hockey team

The Saint John Mohawks were an early amateur senior ice hockey team based in Saint John, New Brunswick, Canada in the 1890s and first decade of the 1900s. The team was the Maritimes champion of ice hockey in 1899.
