= 199th Battalion Duchess of Connaught's Own Irish Rangers, CEF =

199th Battalion, CEF
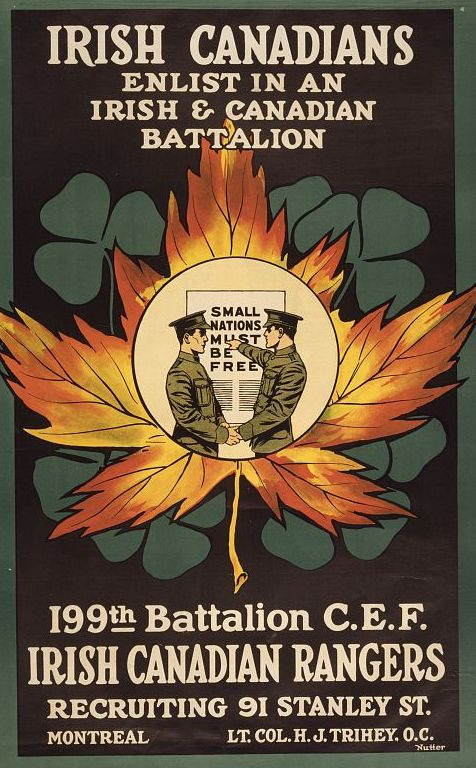
- Recruitment poster, circa 1915
- Active: 1916–1917
- Disbanded: 1917
- Country: Canada
- Branch: Canadian Expeditionary Force
- Type: Infantry
- Garrison/HQ: Montreal
- Motto: Quis separabit? (Latin for 'Who shall separate us?')
- Theatre of war honour: The Great War, 1916–17

The 199th (Duchess of Connaught's Own Irish Rangers) Battalion, CEF was a unit in the Canadian Expeditionary Force (CEF) during the First World War.

== History ==
The battalion was founded by the CEF to improve their recruitment success by having an all-Irish regiment. They were also called the "Duchess of Connaught's Own Irish Rangers", as a tribute to Princess Louise Margaret, Duchess of Connaught and Strathearn, who funded the battalion. Based in Montreal, Quebec, the unit began recruiting during the winter of 1915/16 in that city.

After sailing to England in December 1916, the battalion was sent on a tour of Ireland at the request of the Colonial Secretary, the Canadian-born Bonar Law. On its return to England, the battalion was absorbed into the 23rd Reserve Battalion, CEF, on May 11, 1917.

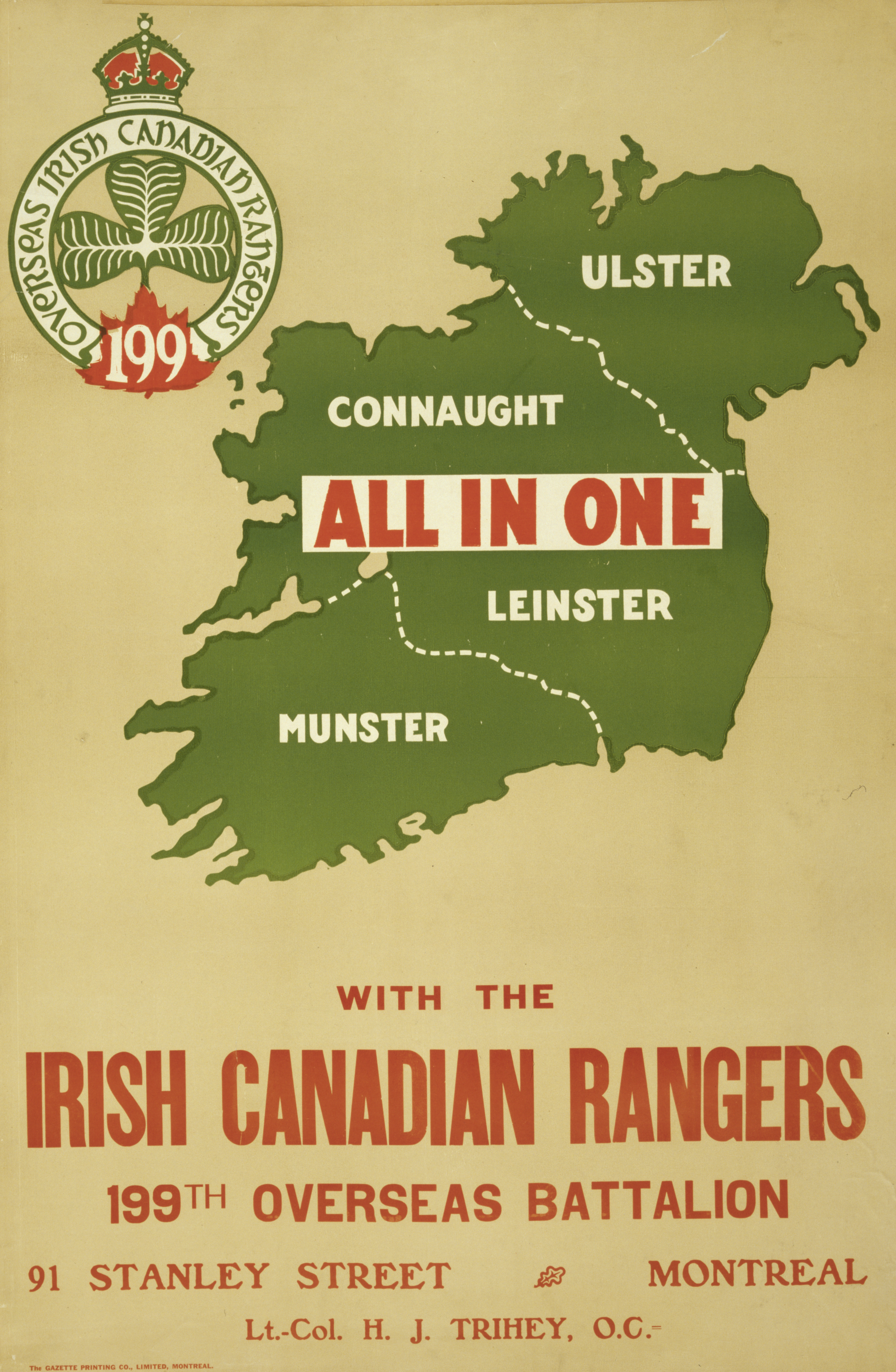
Recruiting poster with map of Ireland

The 199th (Duchess of Connaught's Own Irish Rangers) Battalion, CEF, had two commanding officers: Lieutenant-Colonel H. J. Trihey (December 26, 1916 – January 10, 1917) and Lieutenant-Colonel J. V. O'Donahoe (January 10, 1917 – April 11, 1917).

== Perpetuation ==
In 1920, the perpetuation of the 199th Battalion was assigned to the Irish Canadian Rangers, a Montreal infantry regiment of the Non-Permanent Active Militia that disbanded in 1936.

== See also ==
- List of infantry battalions in the Canadian Expeditionary Force
