= Blair Russel =

Canadian ice hockey player (1880–1961)

- Hockey Hall of Fame, 1965
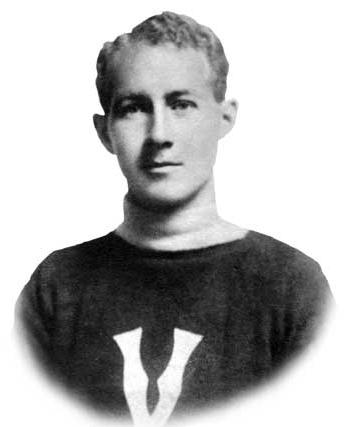
- Born: September 17, 1880 Montreal, Quebec, Canada
- Died: December 7, 1961 (aged 81) Montreal, Quebec, Canada
- Position: Winger
- Played for: Montreal Victorias
- Playing career: 1899–1910

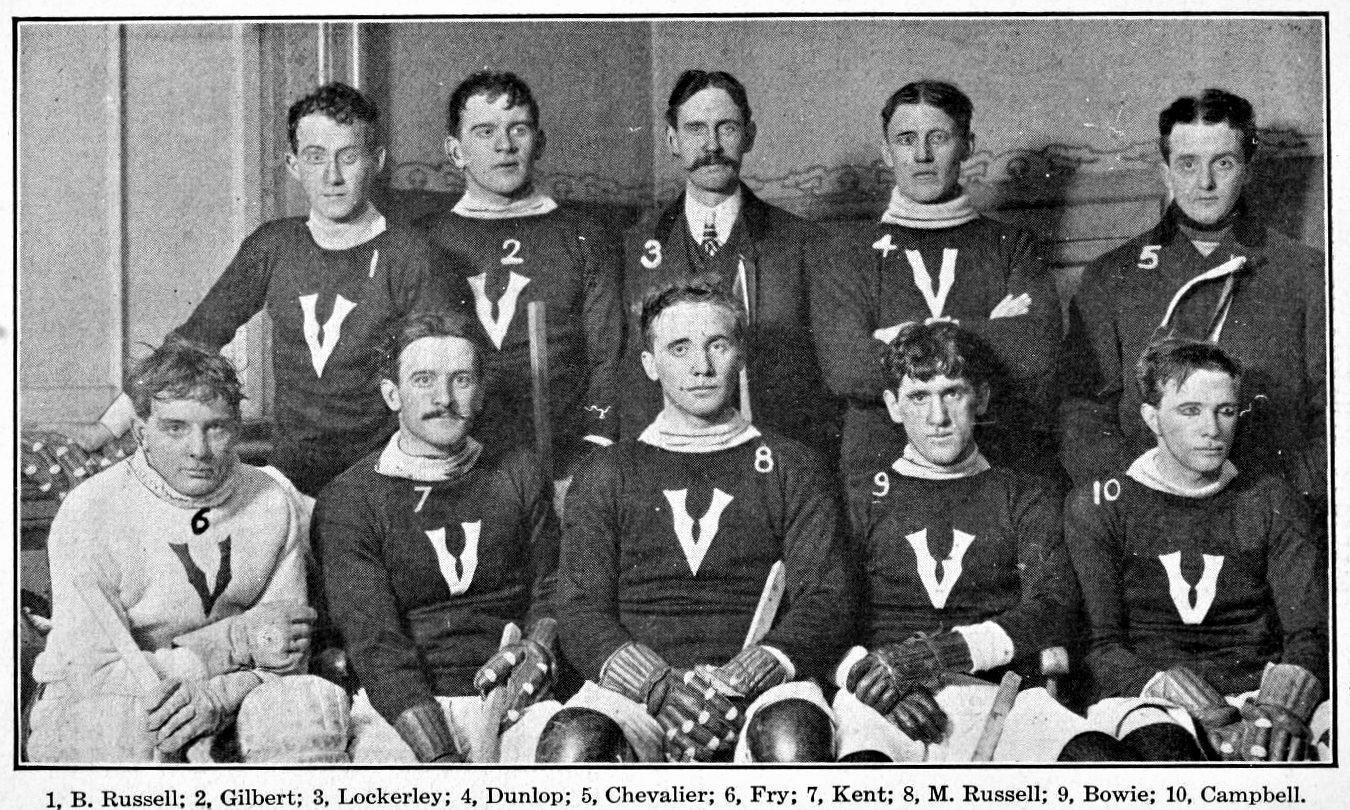
Russel, standing far left, with the Montreal Victorias.

Blair Russel (September 17, 1880 – December 7, 1961) was a Canadian amateur ice hockey forward who played for the Montreal Victorias. On the Victorias he was a long-time linemate of famous goal scorer Russell Bowie. He was inducted into the Hockey Hall of Fame in 1965.

Russel was born in Montreal, Quebec. He joined the Montreal Victorias in 1894 as a junior, playing for the Victorias' team in the Montreal Metropolitan League. Russel moved up to the Victorias Canadian Amateur Hockey League (CAHL) Intermediate team two years later and joined the CAHL Senior team for the 1899–1900 season.

An article by D. A. L. MacDonald in the April 14, 1934 issue of the Montreal Gazette, "Turning Back Hockey's Pages", revisiting players from earlier eras, describes Russel as being "a tireless skater, a great back checker and a fine scorer in his own right."

He was a younger brother of Bert Russel who played with the Ottawa Hockey Club.

== Awards ==
- 1907 – ECAHA 1st All-Star Team
