= Irish Canadian Rangers =

- Active: 1914–1936
- Country: Canada
- Branch: Canadian Militia
- Type: Line infantry
- Role: Infantry
- Size: One regiment
- Part of: Non-Permanent Active Militia
- Garrison/HQ: Montreal, Quebec
- Engagements: First World War
- Battle honours: See #Battle Honours

The Irish Canadian Rangers were an infantry regiment of the Non-Permanent Active Militia of the Canadian Militia (now the Canadian Army). In 1936, the regiment was disbanded as a result of a country-wide reorganization of the Canadian Militia.

== History ==
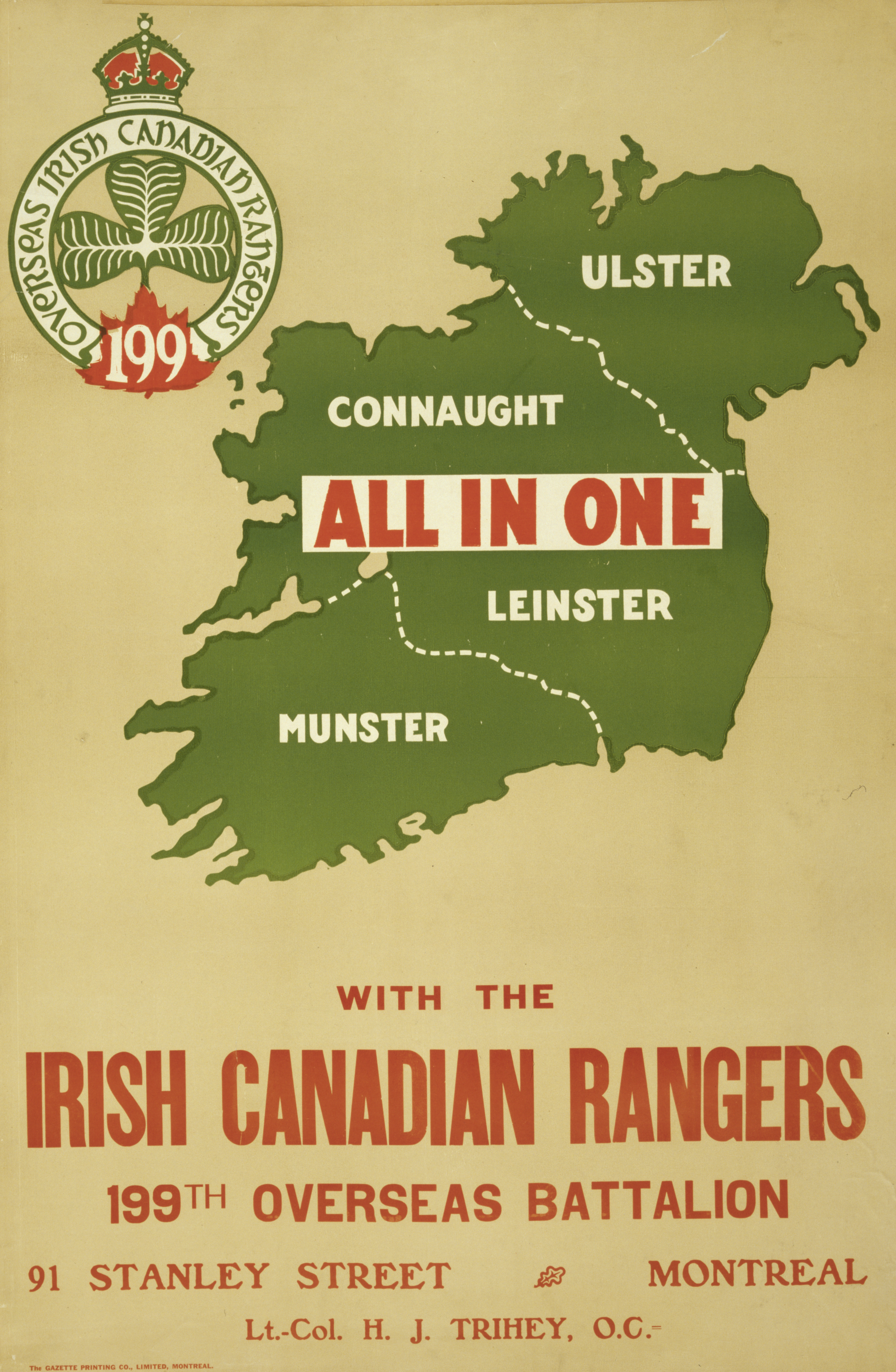
First World War recruiting poster for the Irish Canadian Rangers

First authorized on 29 August 1914 as the 55th Regiment in Montreal, Quebec. It recruited primarily from Montreal's Irish community where along with the rest of the local militia provided home defence in the Montreal area. In the summer of 1915, the regiment recruited an entire company for service with the newly raised 60th Battalion (Victoria Rifles of Canada), CEF. Later that same year, the regiment was the prime recruiter for the newly raised 199th Battalion of the Canadian Expeditionary Force, of which most of the men recruited primarily came from the 55th Regiment.

On 1 April 1920, it was redesignated as The Irish Canadian Rangers as part of the 1920 militia reorganization following the Otter Commission.

On 1 February 1936, the Irish Canadian Rangers were disbanded along with 13 other regiments as part of the 1936 militia reorganization.

== Perpetuations ==
- 199th Battalion (Duchess of Connaught's Own Irish Rangers), CEF

== Organization ==
=== 55th Regiment (29 August 1914) ===
- Regimental Headquarters (Montreal, Quebec)
- A Company
- B Company
- C Company
- D Company
- E Company
- F Company
- G Company
- H Company

=== 55th Regiment, The Irish Canadian Rangers (15 December 1914) ===
- Regimental Headquarters (Montreal, Quebec)
- A Company
- B Company
- C Company
- D Company

=== The Irish Canadian Rangers (1 April, 1920) ===
- 1st Battalion (perpetuating the 199th Battalion, CEF)
- 2nd (Reserve) Battalion

== Battle honours ==
- Hill 70 (Note: Selected to be borne on colours and appointments)
- Ypres, 1917
- Amiens

== Notable members ==
- Lieutenant-Colonel Harry Trihey
