= Harry Trihey =

Canadian ice hockey player (1877–1942)

- Hockey Hall of Fame, 1950
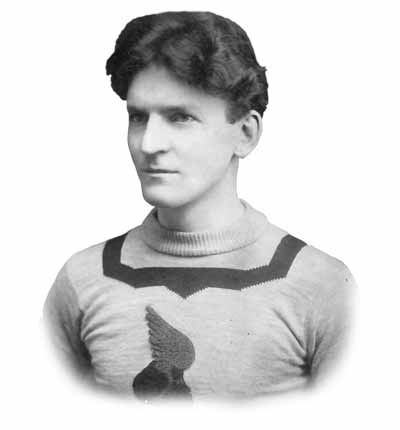
- Born: December 25, 1877 Montreal, Quebec, Canada
- Died: December 9, 1942 (aged 64) Montreal, Quebec, Canada
- Position: Centre
- Played for: Montreal Shamrocks
- Playing career: 1896–1901

Henry Judah "Flip" Trihey (December 25, 1877 – December 9, 1942) was a Canadian amateur ice hockey player and executive in the era before professional ice hockey. Trihey played the centre forward position for the Montreal Shamrocks from 1897 to 1901, and was regarded as the best forward of his day during his playing years.

After his retirement as a hockey player, Trihey became a noted lawyer in Montreal, operating his own law firm and partnering in others while serving as an executive in the Canadian Amateur Hockey League. He served in World War I first as commanding officer of the newly raised militia unit, the 55th Regiment, The Irish Canadian Rangers, then overseas with the newly raised CEF battalion, the 199th Battalion Duchess of Connaught's Own Irish Rangers, CEF, and held the post of Port Commissioner for the Montreal Harbor Commission in later years. He is an Honoured Member of the Hockey Hall of Fame.

== Playing career ==
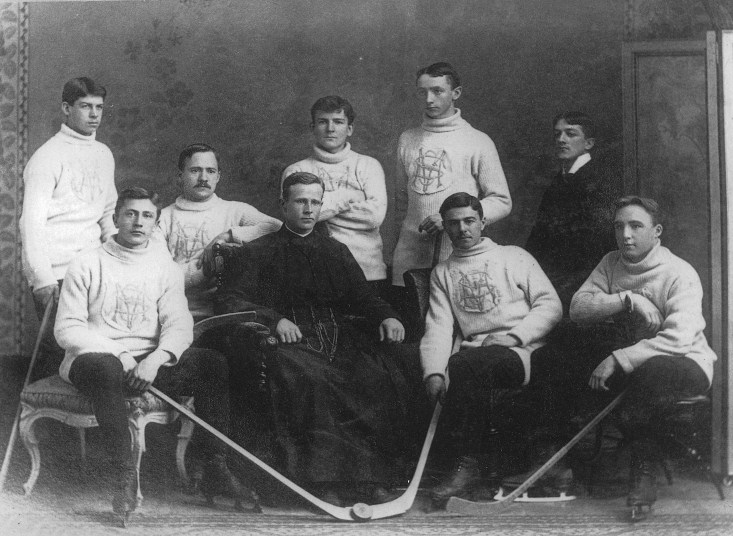
Trihey, in the middle of the back row, with St. Mary's College team.

Before making his major senior debut, Trihey starred in high school hockey with St. Mary's of Montreal between 1893 and 1896, and also appeared with the Montreal Orioles of the Quebec Amateur Hockey Association in 1896.

By the age of 17 Trihey was already well known for his playing ability and in 1897 he made his senior-level debut, playing in a single game with the Montreal Shamrocks of the Amateur Hockey Association of Canada in 1897; he secured a regular shift with the club the following year. Teamed with linemates Arthur Farrell and Fred Scanlan in 1899, Trihey was named captain of the "Fighting Irish" and had a breakout season, leading the league in scoring with 19 goals. On February 4, 1899, Trihey amassed ten goals in one game in a match versus Quebec, which remains the record for the most goals scored by a single player in a major senior regular season match. He went on to score the only goal of the second to the last game of the regular season against the perennial champion Montreal Victorias, which clinched the regular season title for the Shamrocks and earned them the right to defend the Stanley Cup. The defence took place on March 14 against Queen's University of Ontario, a match won by the Shamrocks 6–2, led by Trihey's three goals. In the off-season, he also served on the athletic club's lacrosse side.

Already respected enough to serve on a competition committee regarding the adoption of goal nets and to be quoted as the preeminent authority on forward play by his linemate Arthur Farrell in his 1899 book, Trihey continued his high level of play in 1900, once again leading the Shamrocks to an easy league championship, while repeating his league scoring championship with 17 goals. His best match during the regular season came against the Victorias on January 18, when he scored five goals. The Shamrocks had two defenses of the Stanley Cup that season, the first a best-of-three match against the team from Winnipeg in February. Trihey led the Shamrocks in scoring with seven goals, scoring the game-winning goals in both of the Montreal victories. After the regular season was over, the Shamrocks made a second defense as champions of the Canadian Amateur Hockey League against the Halifax Crescents in March; Trihey added five more goals to his playoff total as Montreal overwhelmed the Maritimers in 10-2 and 11-0 victories, securing the Shamrocks' third and final Cup win.

Hampered by an injured hand, Trihey lost considerable form in 1901, scoring only seven goals in seven regular season matches. The Shamrocks defended the Stanley Cup one last time, again against Winnipeg Victorias in January, but lost in two games. Trihey was again injured in the final game, scoring his last goal in that match, and retired from organized play.

== Later life and legacy ==
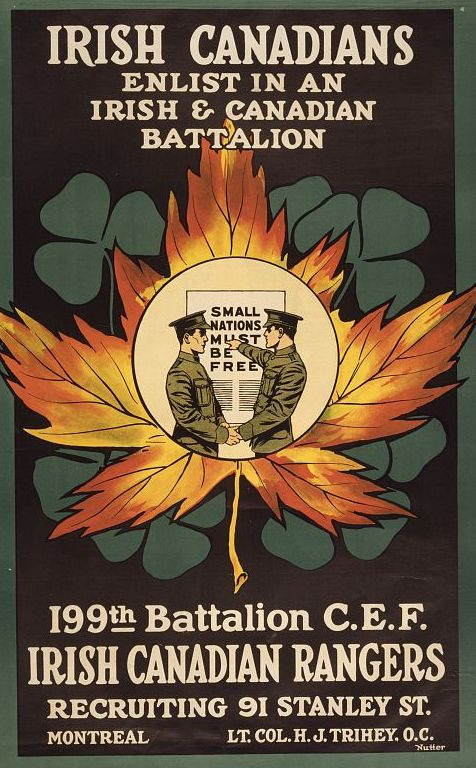
Recruitment poster for the Irish Canadian Rangers, c. 1915

Noted for being a strategic minded player, Trihey had two lasting impacts on the sport. Firstly, he was the first known player to plan advance forward line strategies rather than improvising on the ice. Secondly, reversing the accustomed practice of defencemen flipping the puck into the air and over their opponents' heads, Trihey insisted that they rush the puck up the ice, passing the puck off as the situation warranted. These innovations are regarded as having been crucial to the Shamrocks' success during Trihey's tenure and were widely adopted thereafter. He was also a strong proponent of physical conditioning and diet, unusual to the era. Even after his retirement, he continued to proffer advice on how best to play the game.

Trihey served as secretary-treasurer and president of the CAHL following his retirement as a player until 1904, as well as developing a successful law practice. He also served as a referee both for league and Stanley Cup play and sat on the advisory board of the Montreal Wanderers Hockey Club. During World War I, he was a lieutenant colonel first commanding the newly raised 55th Regiment, The Irish Canadian Rangers in the Canadian Militia and soon after the 199th Battalion Irish Canadian Rangers of the Canadian Expeditionary Force. Trihey resigned his commission and returned to Montreal in 1917 after the British army reversed its earlier promise to send the Rangers into battle as a discrete unit, instead choosing to plug them into the front line as reinforcements, and in the wake of unrest over the Easter Rising in Ireland in 1916. Later in life, he was a partner in the law firm of Plimsoll and Coonan from the 1920s to 1932, and served as a Port Commissioner of the Montreal Harbor Commission.

Trihey lived in Westmount after his playing days, and had three children, Harry Henry O'Neill, Elizabeth Alice Mary and Mary Patricia. He was posthumously inducted into the Hockey Hall of Fame in 1950.

== Career statistics ==
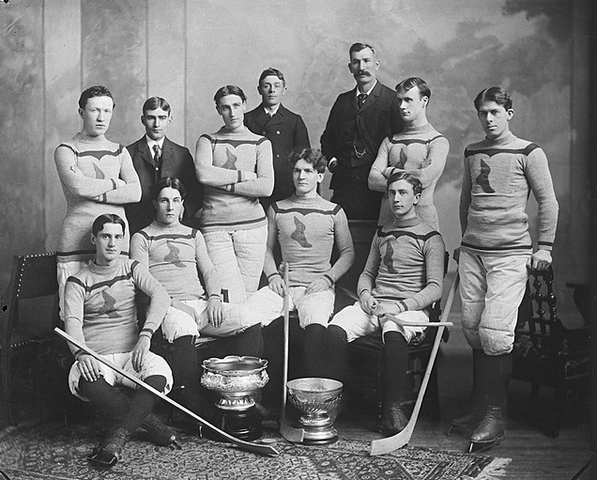
The 1899 Stanley Cup champion Montreal Shamrocks; Trihey is seated third from left.

| | | | Regular season | | Playoffs |
| Season | Team | League | GP | G | GP | G |
|---|---|---|---|---|---|---|
| 1897 | Montreal Shamrocks | AHAC | 1 | 0 | — | — |
| 1898 | Montreal Shamrocks | AHAC | 8 | 3 | — | — |
| 1899 | Montreal Shamrocks | CAHL | 7 | 19 | 1 | 3 |
| 1900 | Montreal Shamrocks | CAHL | 7 | 17 | 5 | 12 |
| 1901 | Montreal Shamrocks | CAHL | 7 | 7 | 2 | 1 |
| AHAC totals | | | 9 | 3 | — | — |
| CAHL totals | | | 21 | 43 | 8 | 16 |

Assists were not yet awarded in this era of hockey
