= Fred Scanlan =

Canadian ice hockey player

- Hockey Hall of Fame, 1965
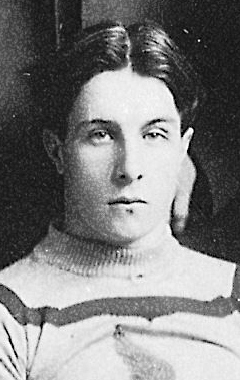
- Born: May 5, 1877 Sainte-Anne-de-Bellevue, Quebec, Canada
- Died: November 11, 1950 (aged 73) San Francisco, California, U.S.
- Position: Left wing
- Shot: Left
- Played for: Montreal Shamrocks; Winnipeg Victorias
- Playing career: 1897–1903

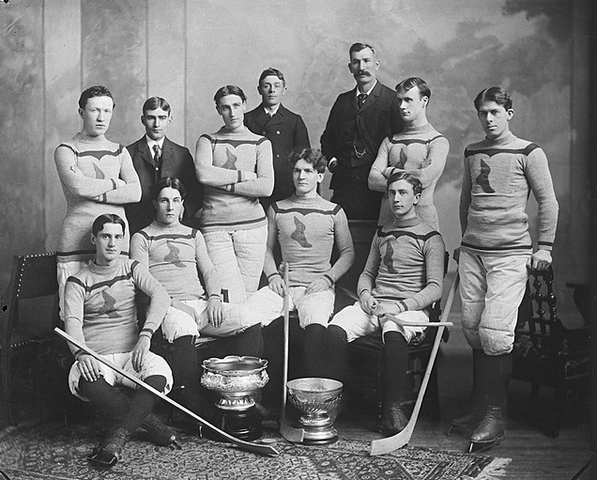
Fred Scanlan, sitting second from left in the front row, with the Montreal Shamrocks in 1899.

John Frederick Scanlan (May 5, 1877 – November 11, 1950) was a Canadian amateur ice hockey player in the era before professional ice hockey. Scanlan was a forward who played for the Montreal Shamrocks and Winnipeg Victorias. Fred Scanlan was a Stanley Cup champion with the Shamrocks in 1899 and 1900. He died in San Francisco. He was buried in the family plot in Notre Dame des Neiges Cemetery in Montreal.

Scanlan was inducted into the Hockey Hall of Fame in 1965.

== Playing career ==
Scanlan joined the senior Montreal Shamrocks for the 1897–98 season. He played four seasons with the Shamrocks, members of Cup championship squads in 1899 and 1900. He played on a forward line with other notable players Arthur Farrell and Harry Trihey. In 1901, Scanlan moved to Winnipeg. He played two seasons with the Winnipeg Victorias before retiring from competitive ice hockey. During his career, he scored 28 goals and had 9 assists in 40 regular season games and six goals in 17 games of playoff and Stanley Cup games.

In November 1903, he moved to San Francisco, California.

== Awards and achievements ==
- Stanley Cup Championships (1899 & 1900)
- Inducted into the Hockey Hall of Fame in 1965
