= Montreal Shamrocks =

- City: Montreal, Quebec
- League: 1886–1891 (independent) 1891–1892 (AHAC); 1893–1894 (dormant); 1895*–1898 (AHAC); 1899–1905 (CAHL); 1906–1909 (ECAHA); 1910 (CHA)/(NHA); 1910–11 (dormant); 1911–12 (IAHU); 1912–24 (MCHL) *Came in mid-season after the Montreal Crystals merged into them.
- Operated: 1886–1924
- Home arena: Victoria Skating Rink, Jubilee Arena, Montreal Arena
- Colours: Green and White
- Head coach: Harry Trihey

Championships
- Stanley Cups: 2 (1899, 1900)

The Montreal Shamrocks were an amateur, later professional, and then amateur again men's ice hockey club in existence from 1886 to 1924, based in Montreal, Quebec, Canada. They were spun off from the Montreal Shamrocks lacrosse club. Starting off as an independent club and briefly playing in the AHAC, the team became a permanent fixture in the early amateur leagues, when in 1895 they merged with the Montreal Crystals and replaced them midway through the 1895 season in the AHAC. The club eventually went professional and played one season in the National Hockey Association (NHA), the predecessor of today's National Hockey League. Afterwards, with the cost of professionalism being too expensive, the team reverted to an amateur club and played into the 1920s in various amateur leagues. Their greatest success came when they won back to back Stanley Cups at the turn of the century in 1899 and 1900.

== Team history ==
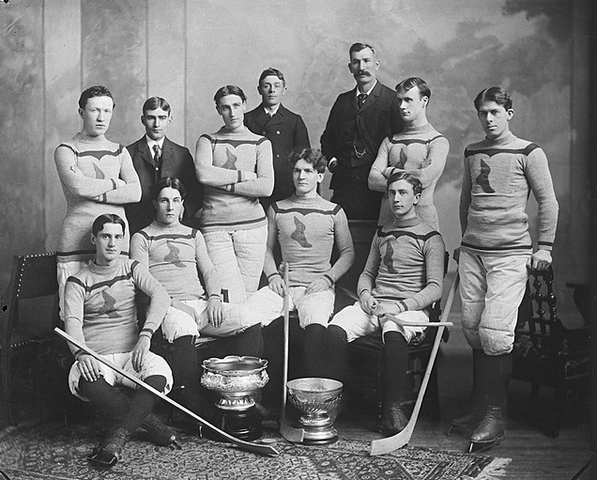
Shamrocks championship club, 1899.

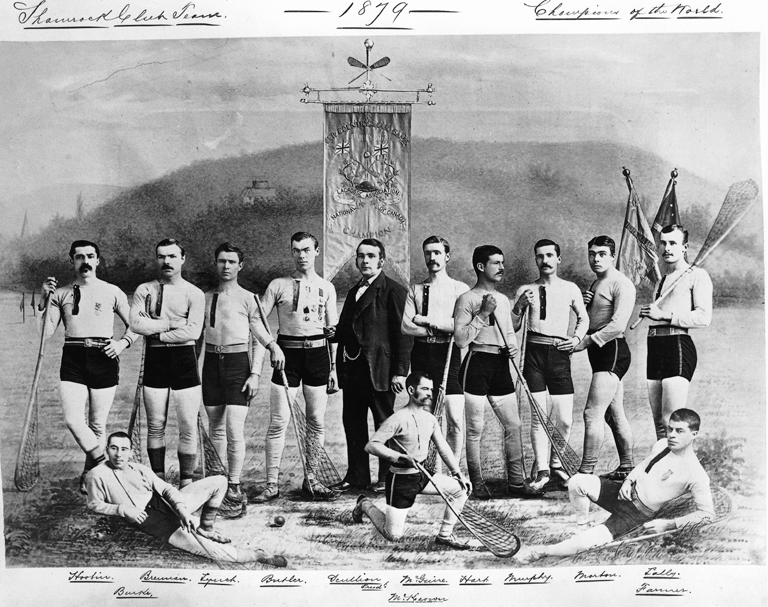
Shamrock championship lacrosse team, 1879

The Shamrocks were founded on December 15, 1886, at a meeting of the Shamrock Lacrosse Club to organize an ice hockey club. The Shamrock Lacrosse Club of Montreal predated the hockey team by twenty years, founded in 1867 by J. B. L. Flynn. Both teams were under the umbrella name of the Shamrock Amateur Athletic Association of Montreal. The Shamrocks started off playing exhibition games, but their standard of play increased leading to the club playing in two Amateur Hockey Association of Canada (AHAC) challenges, in 1891 and 1892 respectively. After these challenges the club went into dormancy, but in 1895 the SAAA purchased the Montreal Crystals' hockey club and merged them into the Shamrocks, reviving the team in the process. The newly revived Montreal Shamrocks hockey club then replaced the Crystals midway through the AHAC's 1895 season. After this, the club began actively competing in season based play.

The club rose to be the pre-eminent senior amateur hockey club in North America by the turn of the twentieth century, winning the Stanley Cup in 1899 and 1900 before losing a Stanley Cup challenge in 1901. Following the retirement of its stars, including Hall of Famers Harry Trihey and Arthur Farrell, the Shamrocks faded from prominence and never again had a winning season. They were eventually done in as a professional entity around 1910 by the growth of professionalisation in hockey. Despite playing one season in the National Hockey Association (the forerunner to the National Hockey League), they had trouble competing financially with other clubs, and with the myriad splits and feuding in elite-level hockey (which lead to the formation, disbandment, and formation of new leagues), the Shamrocks ceased being a professional club and became dormant.

In 1911–12, the club was reactivated and returned to their amateur roots by joining the Interprovincial Amateur Hockey Union. In 1912–13, they joined the Montreal City Hockey League. They played in that league until 1924 when the Shamrocks finally folded.

== Junior teams ==
Outside of the popular senior team, the Montreal Shamrocks had two lower tier teams. First was an intermediate team that played from 1896 through 1912. From 1896 to 1898 they played in the Intermediate Amateur Hockey Association of Canada (IAHAC). Then, from 1899 to 1912, they played in the Intermediate Canadian Amateur Hockey league (ICAHL).

There was also a junior team that played from 1902 through 1916. In 1902 they played in the Junior Montreal Hockey League. In 1903 they played in the Independent Junior League. From 1904 to 1908, they played in the Junior Amateur Hockey Association of Canada (JAHAC). The team became dormant in 1909 but returned in 1915. They would fold after the 1916 season.

== Players ==
While the lacrosse club was a predominantly working-class team, based largely in the Irish Catholic industrial working-class neighbourhood of Griffintown, the hockey club reflected a more bourgeois background, more in keeping with the image the Shamrock Amateur Athletic Association wished to convey to the wider community of Montreal, as Irish Catholics attempted to integrate into the mainstream of the city's body politic in the late 19th century. Many of the players on the Stanley Cup–winning teams of 1899–1901 went on to study at McGill University, and entered into the city's bourgeois professional ranks as doctors, lawyers, and businessmen.

Harry Trihey, the captain of the Cup-winning teams, became a prominent Montreal lawyer and, during World War I, was commissioned by the Government of Canada to raise the Irish Canadian Rangers, a venture that ended with Mr. Trihey resigning his commission and returning to Montreal in 1916 after the British High Command reversed its earlier promise to Mr. Trihey to send the Rangers into battle as a unit, deciding instead to plug them into the front line as reinforcements. Mr. Trihey also had problems recruiting in Quebec and Ireland following the GPO Rising in Dublin at Easter 1916.

== Season-by-season record ==
Year	GP	W	L	T	PTS	GF	GA	PIM	Finish	Playoffs
1896	8	1	7	0	2	16	30	--	5th in AHAC	--
1897	8	1	7	0	2	27	37	--	5th in AHAC	--
1898	8	3	5	0	6	25	36	--	3rd in AHAC	--
1899	8	7	1	0	14	40	21	--	1st in CAHL	Won Stanley Cup
1900	8	7	1	0	14	49	26	--	1st in CAHL	Won Stanley Cup
1901	8	4	4	0	8	30	25	--	3rd in CAHL	Lost Stanley Cup challenge
1902	8	1	7	0	2	15	62	--	5th in CAHL	--
1903	8	0	8	0	0	21	56	--	5th in CAHL	--
1904	8	1	7	0	2	32	74	--	4th in CAHL	--
1905	8	3	7	0	6	41	62	--	4th in CAHL	--
1906	10	0	10	0	0	30	90	--	Last in ECAHA
1907	10	2	8	0	4	52	120	--	Last in ECAHA	--
1908	10	5	5	0	10	53	49	--	4th in ECAHA	--
1909	12	2	10	0	4	56	103	--	4th in ECAHA
1910	12	3	8	1	25	59	100	--	6th in NHA	--
1911–12	5	2	3	0	4	--	--	--	3rd in IAHU

== Prominent players ==
The following players have been inducted into the Hockey Hall of Fame:

- Arthur Farrell
- Jimmy Gardner
- Jack Laviolette
- Jack Marshall
- Didier Pitre
- Fred Scanlan
- Harry Trihey
- Joe Hall
- Tommy Dunderdale

== See also ==
- List of Stanley Cup champions
