= Canadian Amateur Hockey League =

Canadian amateur ice hockey association

- Sport: Ice hockey
- Founded: December 14, 1898 (127 years ago)
- First season: 1899
- Folded: December 11, 1905 (120 years ago)
- Country: Canada
- Last champion: Montreal Victorias (1905)
- Most titles: Montreal Shamrocks (2), Ottawa Hockey Club (2)

The Canadian Amateur Hockey League (CAHL) was an early men's amateur hockey league founded in 1898, replacing the organization that was formerly the Amateur Hockey Association of Canada (AHAC) before the 1898–99 season. The league existed for seven seasons, folding in 1905 and was itself replaced by the Eastern Canada Amateur Hockey Association (ECAHA). Formed because of a dispute between teams of the AHAC, it further developed the sport in its transition to professional, with a growing focus on revenues. The CAHL itself would fold over a dispute, leading to the new ECAHA league.

== History ==
=== Founding ===
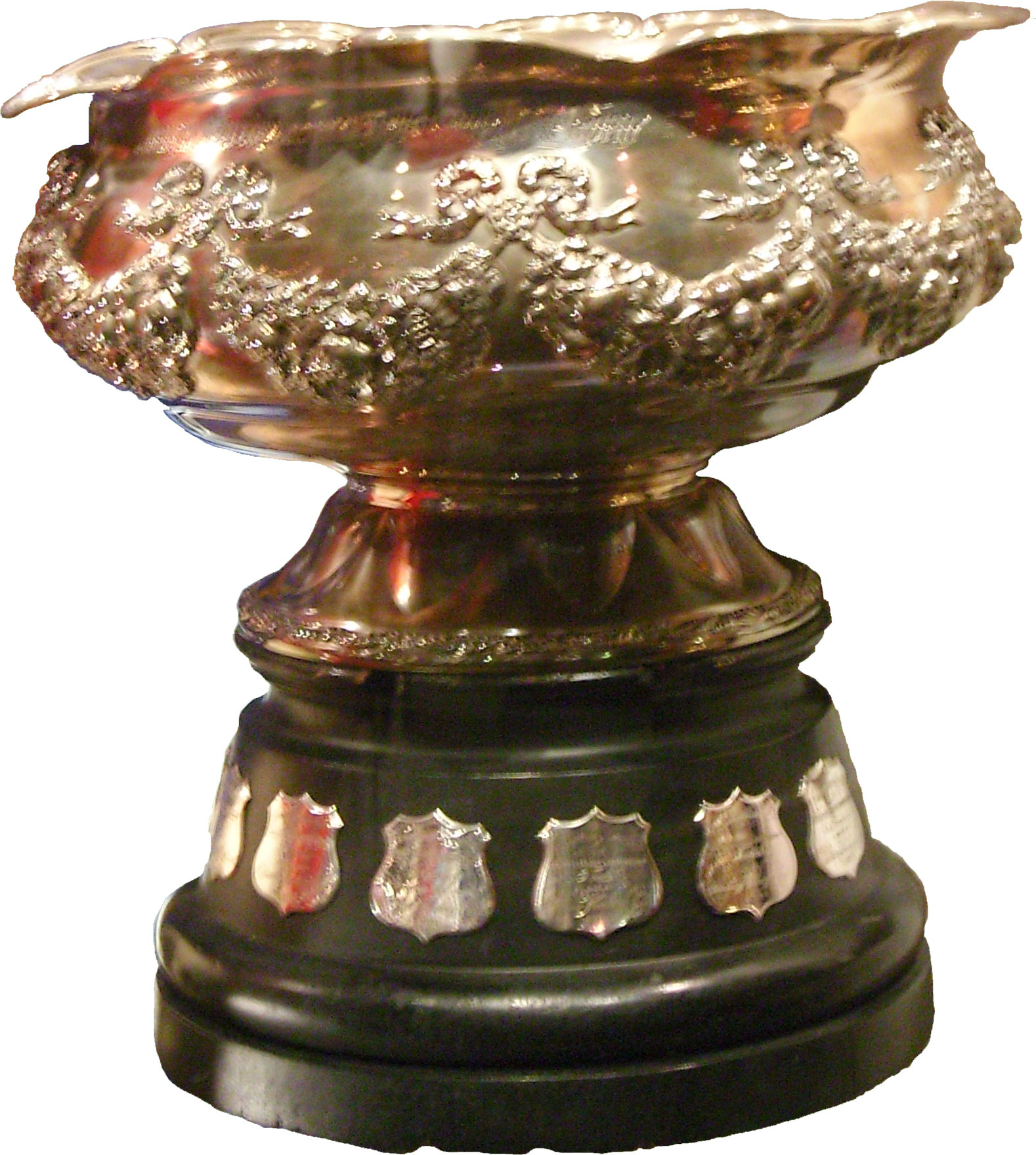
Championship trophy of the CAHL.

The annual meeting of the Amateur Hockey Association of Canada (AHAC) was held in Montreal on December 10, 1898, and was reported as "a cataclysm in the hockey world."

At the previous year's meeting, the application of the Ottawa Capitals to join was declined. In 1898, the Capitals had won the intermediate championship and applied again for AHAC membership. The AHAC executive then voted in favor of admitting the Capitals for league membership. This led to the representatives of the Quebec, Montreal Victorias and Ottawa clubs opting to withdraw from the association. The representative of the Montreal Hockey Club asked the group to reconsider but was declined, after which point Montreal also withdrew.

The withdrawing teams then met at the Windsor Hotel the same day. A representative of the McGill University also attended on the possibility that McGill would join. On December 14, the group met again and organized the CAHL, adding also the Montreal Shamrocks and not McGill. The new league adopted the existing constitution of the AHAC.

The following executive committee was formed:

- H. Wilson, (president)
- A. E. Swift, Quebec (1st. vice-president)
- E. P. Murphy, (2nd. vice-president)
- George Jones, (secretary-treasurer)

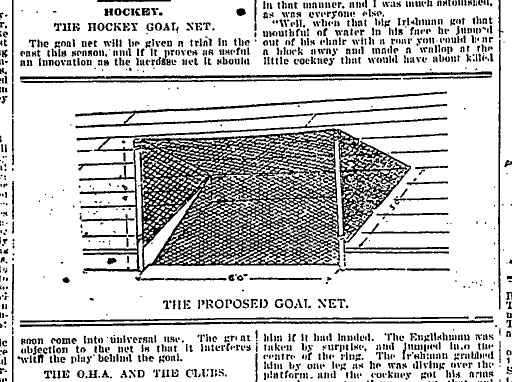
Diagram of hockey net

=== Hockey net ===
Almost lost in the shuffle of the dissolution of AHAC and the founding of the CAHL was the first use of netting for the goals. Proposed by the Quebec team, a rope was used to connect the tops of the existing goal posts. Attached to the rope and the posts was netting in a pocket, to catch any pucks that entered the net. Nets had been in use for the goals in lacrosse and ice polo. The nets became a permanent part of the CAHL rinks after an exhibition series in 1899.

=== Final season ===
The league would stay with the same five teams until the 1904 season. During the season, Ottawa withdrew from the league in a dispute with the league. The league continued its schedule with the remaining four teams. The following season, the league admitted the Montreal Le National and Montreal Westmount clubs in place of Ottawa, which joined the Federal Amateur Hockey League. It would be the final season of the league, as in the off-season the Montreal Wanderers and Ottawa would form the Eastern Canada Amateur Hockey Association and absorb the teams of the CAHL.

== Teams ==
Season	Teams	Champion
1899	Montreal Hockey Club, Montreal Shamrocks†, Montreal Victorias, Ottawa Hockey Club and Quebec HC	Montreal Shamrocks (best record)
1900	Montreal HC, Montreal Shamrocks^{†}, Montreal Victorias, Ottawa HC and Quebec HC	Montreal Shamrocks (best record)
1901	Montreal HC, Montreal Shamrocks, Montreal Victorias, Ottawa HC and Quebec HC	Ottawa HC (best record)
1902	Montreal HC†, Montreal Shamrocks, Montreal Victorias, Ottawa HC and Quebec HC	Montreal HC (best record)
1903	Montreal HC, Montreal Shamrocks, Montreal Victorias, Ottawa HC^{†} and Quebec HC	Ottawa HC (best record)
1904	Montreal HC, Montreal Shamrocks, Montreal Victorias, Ottawa HC^{†‡} and Quebec HC	Quebec HC (best record)
1905	Montreal HC, Montreal Le National, Montreal Shamrocks, Montreal Victorias, Montreal Westmount and Quebec HC	Montreal Victorias (best record)

† Stanley Cup winner ‡ Ottawa resigned February 8, 1904.

== See also ==
- Federal Amateur Hockey League
- List of Stanley Cup champions
- List of pre-NHL seasons
- List of ice hockey leagues
