= Cyclone Taylor =

Canadian ice hockey player and civil servant (1884–1979)

Cyclone Taylor MBE
- Hockey Hall of Fame, 1947
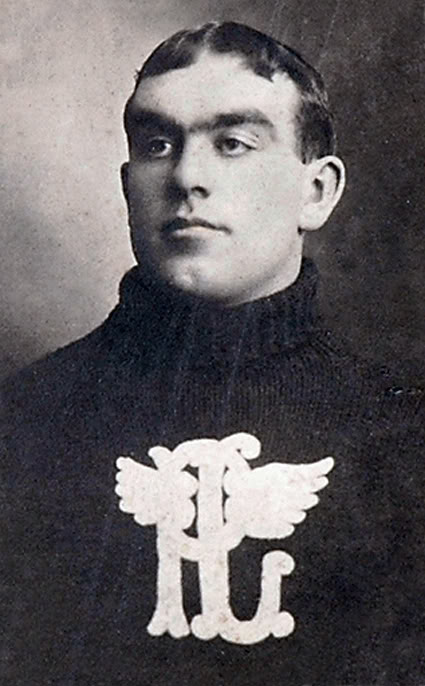
- Taylor during his time with the Portage Lakes Hockey Club in 1905
- Born: June 23, 1884 Tara, Ontario, Canada
- Died: June 9, 1979 (aged 94) Vancouver, British Columbia, Canada
- Height: 5 ft 8 in (173 cm)
- Weight: 165 lb (75 kg; 11 st 11 lb)
- Position: Rover / Cover-point
- Shot: Left
- Played for: Portage Lakes Hockey Club; Ottawa Hockey Club; Pittsburgh Athletic Club; Renfrew Creamery Kings; Vancouver Millionaires; Vancouver Maroons
- Playing career: 1906–1922

Frederick Wellington "Cyclone" Taylor MBE (June 23, 1884 – June 9, 1979) was a Canadian professional ice hockey player and civil servant. A cover-point and rover, he played professionally from 1906 to 1922, and is acknowledged as one of the first stars of the professional era of hockey. Taylor was recognized as one of the fastest skaters and most prolific scorers, winning five scoring championships in the PCHA. He won the Stanley Cup twice, with Ottawa in 1909 and Vancouver in 1915, and was inducted into the Hockey Hall of Fame in 1947.

Born and raised in Southern Ontario, Taylor moved to Manitoba in 1906 to continue his hockey career. He quickly departed to play in Houghton, Michigan, and spent two years in the International Hockey League, the first openly professional hockey league in the world. He returned to Canada in 1907 and joined the Ottawa Senators, spending two seasons with the team. During those years, Taylor was often spoken of in the same stature as baseball's Ty Cobb, and in 1909, when Taylor signed with the Renfrew Creamery Kings, the pair were the highest paid athletes in their respective sports. Taylor moved to Vancouver in 1912 to play for the Vancouver Millionaires of the Pacific Coast Hockey Association (PCHA), where he played for the remainder of his career until 1922. In the 1918 Stanley Cup Final, Taylor scored 9 goals in the series, setting an NHL-era Stanley Cup Final record that remains unbroken.

Upon moving to Ottawa in 1907, Taylor was given a position within the federal Interior Department as an immigration clerk and remained an immigration official for the next several decades. In 1914, Taylor was the first Canadian official to board the Komagata Maru, which was involved in a major incident relating to Canadian immigration. Taylor ultimately became the Commissioner of Immigration for British Columbia and the Yukon, the highest position in the region.

In 1946, he was named a Member of the Order of the British Empire for his services as an immigration officer, and he retired in 1950.

== Early life ==
Frederick Wellington Taylor was born in Tara, Ontario, the second son and fourth of five children to Archie and Mary Taylor. (Note: The other children were, in order: Russell, Harriet, Elizabeth, and Rosella. See Whitehead 1977, p. 10.) The exact date of Taylor's birth is uncertain, though most sources give it as June 23, 1884. (Note: Hockey historian Eric Zweig has noted there are discrepancies in various sources relating to Taylor's birth, with both 1884 and 1885 listed. He concludes that the 1884 date is likely the correct one. See Zweig 2007, pp. 47–48.) Archie, the son of Scottish immigrants, was a travelling salesman who sold farm equipment. Taylor was close to his mother, a devout Methodist, and took after her in that he never smoked, drank, or swore. Taylor claimed that he was named Frederick Wellington after a local veterinarian, a friend of his father. (Note: Taylor said that on the day of his birth Archie was fishing with Frederick the veterinarian and decided to name his son Frederick Wellington. See Whitehead 1977, pp. 8–9.) At the age of six, Taylor moved with his family to Listowel, a town 80 kilometres (50 mi) south of Tara. The Taylor family was rather poor: Archie initially made around C$50–60 a month, a low wage for the era, especially for a family with five children. To help out, Taylor left school when he was 17 and started working in a local piano factory. His earnings of around $20 a month helped supplement his father's salary, which had risen to $75 monthly.

At age five, Taylor began skating on ponds near Tara and learned to play hockey when he moved to Listowel. He was given his first pair of skates and was taught by a local barber named Jack Riggs, who was known in the community for his speed skating. Taylor first joined an organized team, the Listowel Mintos, in 1897 when he was 13, and spent the next five years with them. Though initially a couple of years younger than the other players, Taylor was able to keep up with them, and by the time he was sixteen, he was one of the top players and leading scorers in the league. The Mintos joined the Ontario Hockey Association (OHA), the governing body of hockey in Ontario, for the 1900–01 season. They entered a local league, winning the championship as Taylor played a major role. The team reached the provincial junior championship in 1904, losing in sudden-death overtime. This greatly enhanced Taylor's name across the province, and several teams were interested in having him join them.

In October 1903, Taylor was reportedly invited by Bill Hewitt, the secretary of the OHA, to play for the Toronto Marlboros. Happy with his life in Listowel, where he had family and a job, Taylor rejected the offer. This angered Hewitt, who had expected Taylor to accept his invitation and change cities. The OHA regulated player transfers between clubs, ostensibly to keep players from moving from team to team and to preserve the ideals of amateurism. As Taylor refused to join the Marlboros, he was not allowed to play anywhere else in Ontario. Hewitt thus banned Taylor from playing hockey in Ontario for the 1903–04 season. (Note: Zweig has questioned this version of events, which was recounted by Taylor in the 1970s: Zweig notes that if the offer to join the Marlboros was made, it was likely in 1904, not 1903 when he was still relatively unknown. Zweig also questions how involved Hewitt, an executive of the OHA, would be with one of its teams. See Zweig 2007, pp. 48–49.) Taylor left Listowel in 1904 and tried to join a team in Thessalon, Ontario, but was not sanctioned to play for them. Rather than play anywhere else, he sat out the 1904–05 season.

== Hockey career ==
=== Portage la Prairie and Portage Lakes (1906–1907) ===
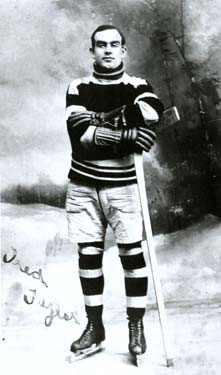
Taylor with the Ottawa Senators in 1908

Frustrated with sitting out a whole hockey season, Taylor looked for other options for the upcoming season. The OHA only had jurisdiction in Ontario and could not ban Taylor from joining teams elsewhere, so in early January 1906 he moved west to Manitoba and joined a team in Portage la Prairie, Manitoba, for the 1905–06 season. As hockey was strictly amateur in Canada at the time, Taylor was offered room, board, and $25 a month in spending money to join the team. In his first game with Portage la Prairie, Taylor scored two goals, impressing his opponents with his skilled play. After one match against the Kenora Thistles, the top team in the league, Taylor was offered a chance to join them as they travelled east to challenge for the Stanley Cup, the championship trophy of Canadian hockey. While considering the offer, Taylor was approached by representatives from the Portage Lakes Hockey Club. A professional team based in Houghton, Michigan, Portage Lakes were members of the International Hockey League (IHL), the first openly professional hockey league. (Note: Though ostensibly amateur, teams in Canada had started to covertly compensate players by this time despite all leagues expressly forbidding such a practice. See Mason 1998, pp. 2–3.) Offered US$400 to join the team, plus expenses, Taylor agreed. Taylor had previously played in Houghton in the 1902–03 season when he had been invited to join a few friends studying dentistry there to play a series of exhibition games against local teams.

In early February, having played four games for Portage la Prairie, Taylor left the team for Houghton. Playing cover-point (an early version of a defenceman), Taylor scored eleven goals in six games for Portage Lakes as the team won the 1906 IHL championship. The following season saw Taylor score 14 goals in 23 games as Portage Lakes repeated as league champions. Taylor recalled his time in the IHL, a rough and physical league, with fondness, saying that the "league was a wonderful testing and training ground, and I was a far better player for my experience there." He also found the atmosphere nice, as "there was a different feeling there with the sport seemingly so far from its home and us all down from Canada as sort of paid mercenaries."

Offering high salaries, the IHL brought in many of the top Canadian players, who were happy to play hockey for the first time in their careers (though some had been covertly paid in Canada). In 1907, the Eastern Canada Amateur Hockey Association (ECAHA), the top league in Canada, decided to allow professional players. Many Canadian players took the opportunity to play in Canada and left the IHL, which folded that summer. Taylor returned to Listowel for the summer of 1907, playing lacrosse and entertaining offers to join various hockey teams for the upcoming season. Representatives from the Quebec Bulldogs, Montreal Victorias, Montreal Wanderers, and Cobalt Silver Kings all met with Taylor. Cobalt's offer was the most interesting to Taylor largely due to their wealthy owner, rail-builder and mine-owner Michael John O'Brien, though he turned Cobalt down as the club did not offer enough money.

=== Ottawa Senators (1907–1909) ===
In Portage La Prairie they called him a tornado, in Houghton, Michigan, he was known as a whirlwind. From now on he'll be known as Cyclone Taylor.

— Allegedly written by Malcolm Brice, a reporter for the Ottawa Free Press, after hearing Earl Grey, Governor General of Canada refer to Taylor as a "cyclone" about his skating ability. (Note: Despite claims by Whitehead that Brice wrote this, searches by hockey historians have found no such article. See Kitchen 2008, p. 160 and Zweig 2007, p. 47.)

Taylor ended up signing with the Ottawa Senators, who played in the ECAHA (the league would drop the word "Amateur" in 1908 and become known as the ECHA). The Senators offered him $500 for the season, a high salary for the time but not extravagant. What attracted Taylor to Ottawa was that the club also promised him a job within the immigration branch of the federal Department of the Interior. Taylor was intrigued by the offer—the ability to have a permanent career was important. A position in the civil service promised job security for Taylor after his hockey career ended. He thus took up a position as a junior clerk for $35 a month.

Soon after arriving in Ottawa, Taylor received offers to leave the Senators and join other teams. The Ottawa Victorias, who played in the Federal Amateur Hockey League, a rival to the ECAHA, asked Taylor to play a two-game series against the Renfrew Creamery Kings of the local Upper Ottawa Valley Hockey League, with the possibility of a full-season contract. Renfrew, owned by O'Brien, argued that Taylor was not allowed to play for the Victorias, and the Stanley Cup trustees confirmed he was not eligible. Instead, Renfrew made their proposal to Taylor for after the series ended: $1,500 for the season. They argued that he could leave the team because Taylor had not signed a contract with Ottawa. Taylor visited Renfrew, about 80 kilometres (50 mi) from Ottawa, and initially agreed to sign there as he heard rumours that he was not wanted in Ottawa. However, representatives from the Senators met up with Taylor and confirmed the club did want him, which convinced him to return for the start of the season.

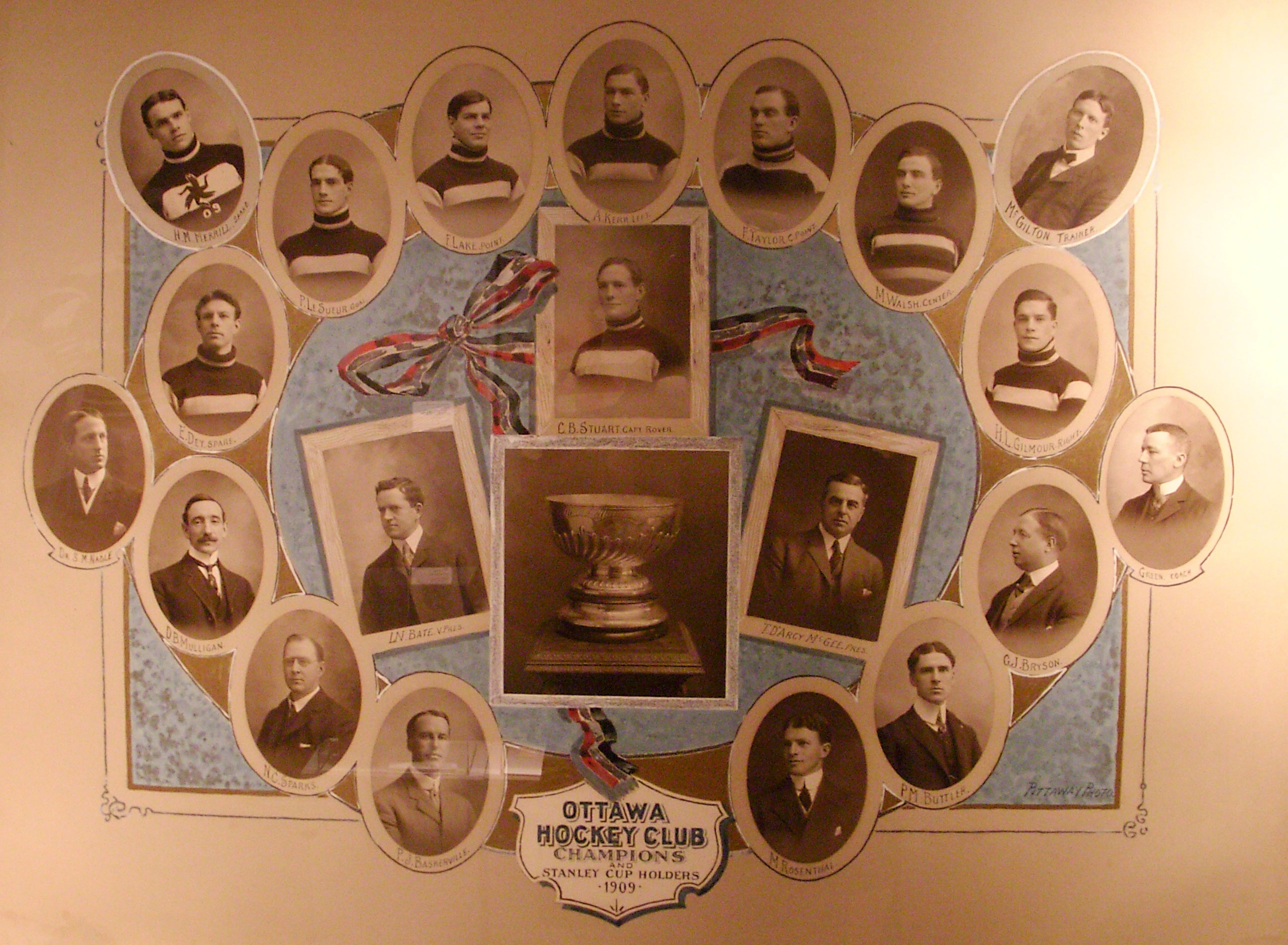
The Ottawa Senators on a postcard celebrating their Stanley Cup win in 1909. Taylor is on the top row, third from right.

Taylor played at centre for the Senators in the first game of the season. Listed as being 5 ft 8 in (1.73 m) and 165 pounds (75 kg), Taylor was of average size for a hockey player in the era. As one of the main forwards and one of the fastest players in hockey, he was frequently called for being offside due to being too quick for his linemates and the rules at the time forbidding any forward passing. It was decided then that he would move to cover-point for the rest of the season so that he would be further back on the ice and able to better utilize his speed. Later in the season, during a January 11, 1908, game against the Montreal Wanderers, the Earl Grey, Governor General of Canada, was reportedly in attendance. Afterward, he was allegedly overheard by Ottawa Free Press reporter Malcolm Brice saying, "That new No. 4, Taylor, he's a cyclone if ever I saw one," a reference to Taylor's speed. Though previously referred to as both a "tornado" and a "whirlwind", the "Cyclone" stuck with Taylor for the rest of his career. Taylor performed well in his first season with Ottawa, scoring nine goals in eleven games and being named the best cover-point in the ECAHA. After the season ended, the Senators travelled to New York City for a series of exhibition matches against the Wanderers, during which Taylor garnered the most press attention with his skills.

At the start of the 1908–09 season, Taylor signed with the Pittsburgh Athletic Club of the Western Pennsylvania Hockey League. However after three games there, the team released him and Fred Lake, accusing them of trying to undermine their management and intentionally losing a game to do so. Taylor considered offers from other teams but decided to return to Ottawa for the season, playing 11 games and scoring 9 goals. The Senators won the league championship and, as per the regulations of the era, were awarded the Stanley Cup as a result.

=== Renfrew Creamery Kings (1909–1912) ===
In the lead-up to the 1909–10 season, Taylor was again courted by O'Brien to join his team in Renfrew, Ontario. Throughout November 1909 there were contradictory newspaper reports about the club Taylor would sign with, and both Ottawa and Renfrew claimed he had signed with them. By December 30, Taylor finalized an agreement with the Renfrew Creamery Kings. His salary was reported to be as high as $5,250 for the season, which, if accurate, would have made Taylor the highest-paid athlete in Canadian history up to that time. A comparison was made with Major League Baseball player Ty Cobb, another top athlete at the time who Taylor was often compared to, who had signed around the same time for US$6,500. (Note: The figure $5,250 comes from Whitehead's biography of Taylor. However, Cosentino has suggested the base salary was closer to $2,000, with the rest coming from a guaranteed salary outside of hockey and a bond to ensure he would sign. See Whitehead 1977, pp. 105–106 and Cosentino 1990, p. 73.)

The signing of Taylor was important for O'Brien for a different reason. He had long sought to win the Stanley Cup, and his previous efforts to challenge it had been unsuccessful. Moreover, when the ECHA had re-constituted itself as the Canadian Hockey Association (CHA) in November 1909, O'Brien was unable to join. He thus started a new league, the National Hockey Association (NHA), which was composed of teams refused entry to the CHA and new teams O'Brien owned. By adding Taylor to the new league, the NHA gained immediate legitimacy and the CHA folded within a few weeks, at which point its remaining teams were admitted into the NHA. (Note: The NHA was replaced by the NHL as the top league in Eastern Canada starting in 1917–18. See McKinley 2000, pp. 97–98.)

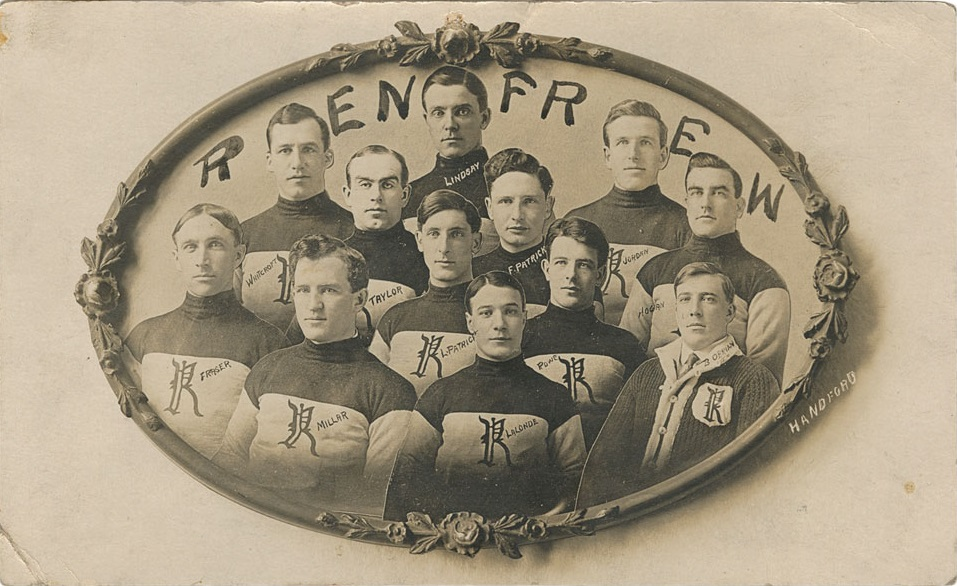
The 1909–10 Renfrew Creamery Kings on a postcard. Taylor is fourth from left.

Aside from the high salary, Taylor was interested in joining Renfrew because they made it known they were trying to build a strong team and were willing to pay for it. Shortly before he signed with the club, they had agreed to terms with the highly sought-after brothers Lester and Frank Patrick. The Patricks had been approached by six teams before they agreed to sign with Renfrew for $3,000 and $2,000 respectively. Other prominent players who joined the club were goaltender Bert Lindsay and forward Herb Jordan, the latter of whom was agreeing to turn professional by signing with Renfrew. The team was further bolstered mid-way through the season with the acquisition of Newsy Lalonde, one of the highest-scoring players of the era. With such a high-priced roster, the team became informally known as the "Millionaires".

Despite the high-priced talent, which included four future members of the Hockey Hall of Fame on the roster, Renfrew finished third in the NHA and thus could not make a challenge for the Stanley Cup, a right reserved for the league winner. Taylor performed well, scoring ten goals in twelve games, finishing fourth on the team. During the season, one of the most famous legends about Taylor developed: before Renfrew's first game in Ottawa against the Senators, Taylor boasted he would score a goal while skating backward (an unusual way to skate at the time, let alone score). Despite his boast before the February 12, 1908, game, Taylor was held scoreless as Ottawa won 8–5. However, during the next game between the two, on March 8 in Renfrew, the Creamery Kings won 17–2, and Taylor scored three times, including once where he skated backward.

Taylor re-signed with Renfrew for the 1910–11 season, though a league-wide salary drop saw him earn only $1,800. Reflecting later on, Taylor said that he and the other players "knew those big first-year salaries couldn't last." The Patrick brothers had moved west to join their father to establish a lumber company in British Columbia, and Lalonde joined the rival Montreal Canadiens. A weakened Renfrew team again finished third. Taylor scored twelve goals in sixteen games to again place fourth on the team in scoring.

Renfrew disbanded before the 1911–12 season, and the rights to its players were dispersed to the other teams in the league. Taylor was claimed by the Wanderers, whose owner, Sam Lichtenhein, was working on a new arena and needed a star player to bolster attendance. However, Taylor refused to report to the club because he was not interested in moving to or playing in Montreal, stating he would only play for Ottawa or not at all. Despite attempts by the Senators to trade for him, Taylor's rights remained with the Wanderers, leading him to sit out the season. Though he did not play, Taylor was still paid a salary of $1,200 by the Senators in hopes that he would join them for the following season, and he spent the winter playing a few games and working as a referee in the local semi-professional league. At the end of the season the NHA sent an all-star team to Vancouver to play a series of games against teams from the Pacific Coast Hockey Association (PCHA), a new professional league established by the Patricks in Western Canada. Though Taylor had not played all year, the Patricks had consented to the exhibition on the condition that Taylor would be included on the NHA team.

=== Vancouver Millionaires (1912–1922) ===
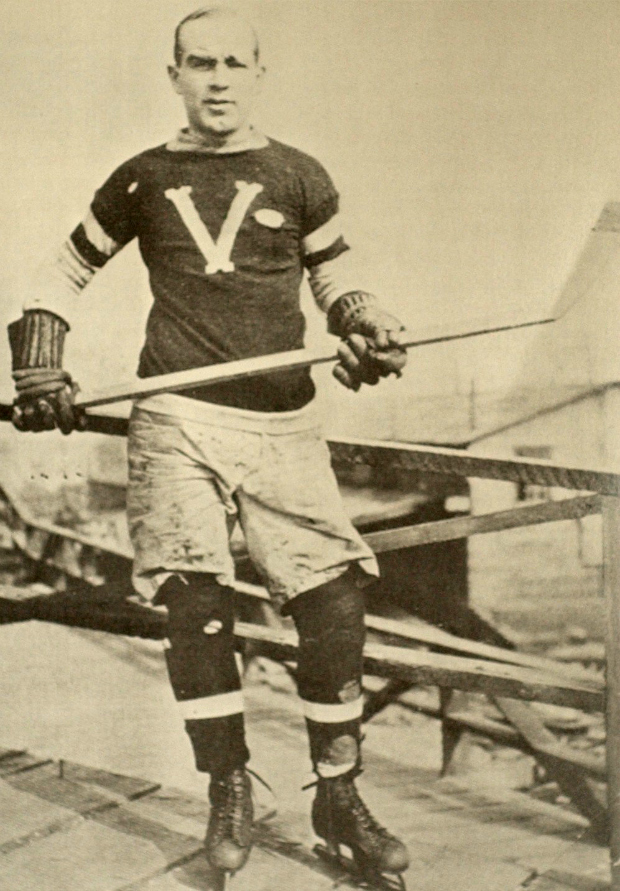
Taylor during his first season with the Vancouver Millionaires, 1912–13. He would spend the last nine seasons of his career with the team, winning the Stanley Cup again in 1915.

Lester and Frank Patrick had moved to Western Canada in 1907 and 1908 to work for their father Joe in the lumber company he established there. They sold the family business in 1911 and used the money from the sale to set up the PCHA, recruiting players from Eastern Canada to join the league.

After the conclusion of the 1911–12 season, the Wanderers gave up trying to sign Taylor. He was offered a contract of $3,000 to join the Toronto Tecumsehs, double the salary of any other player, but turned it down because he did not like the idea of being bought and sold. Ottawa also made an offer of $1,800 for the season. Still, again, Taylor turned it down. During the off-season, Taylor frequently contacted the Patricks, who encouraged him to move west and play in their league. After months of discussion, Taylor agreed to join the Vancouver Millionaires, a decision that was announced on November 20. He was given a salary of $2,200, transportation back to Ottawa, and a four-month leave of absence from his immigration job. The offer made Taylor the highest-paid player in hockey again, and was at least $500 more than anyone had earned in the PCHA the previous season. As was his style, Taylor did not sign a contract, later stating that there "never was in those days with the Patricks. It was just a verbal agreement, and we shook hands on it." Speaking after the agreement, Lester Patrick noted that they "had Fred Taylor in mind right from the beginning. His acquisition was just a matter of timing."

Much like in the NHA, Taylor's presence gave legitimacy to the PCHA. While the first games of the PCHA's inaugural season only had half the tickets sold, the Millionaires sold out their home opener for the 1912–13 season, Taylor's debut in the league. It was the first sell-out for the PCHA. Before that first game, against the New Westminster Royals on December 10, Taylor had severe abdominal pains and nearly missed the match. He barely made it to the game, though he scored in a 7–2 Vancouver victory. The abdominal pain turned out to be appendicitis, which left Taylor severely ill during his first season in the West. He originally wanted to wait for surgery until the season was over, but ultimately postponed it indefinitely. Even so, he managed to play in all sixteen games for Vancouver during the season, finishing with ten goals and eight assists (the PCHA was the first league to officially keep track of assists), fourth on his team and sixth overall in the league for scoring.

==== Conversion to rover ====
The following season saw Taylor move positions to rover, a position that combined offence and defence; he would play as a rover for the remainder of his career. The change to a position that allowed for more offence helped Taylor lead the PCHA in scoring with 39 points in 16 games, and he tied with Tommy Dunderdale for the goal-scoring title with 24. Taylor repeated as the scoring leader in 1914–15, with 45 points in 16 games, and finished tied for second in goals scored with 23. Vancouver finished first in the league and thus earned the right to compete for the Stanley Cup. Starting in 1914, the Cup had been contested by the champions of the PCHA and the NHA, with each league hosting a best-of-five series in alternating years. The 1915 Final was held in Vancouver, and as the leagues used different rules, games alternated between PCHA and NHA rules. (Note: The most prominent difference in rules was that the PCHA still used the rover, while the NHA had abolished the position; thus PCHA games used seven players (six skaters and a goaltender) on each team, while the NHA used six. See Bowlsby 2012, p. 39.) The NHA champions were the Ottawa Senators, with whom Taylor had played previously and won the Cup in 1909. They focused on trying to contain him but to no avail. Vancouver won the first three games to win the Cup, with Taylor scoring eight goals and two assists.

Taylor repeated as PCHA scoring champion again in 1915–16 with 35 points in 18 games, finishing second for goals with 21 and tied for the lead in assists with 14. Vancouver finished second in the league and thus could not defend its Stanley Cup title. After the season ended, Taylor announced his retirement, though this was not taken seriously by the league or his peers and was largely ignored. True enough, he was convinced to re-join the team before the start of the 1916–17 season. He started the season strongly, leading the league in scoring early on, but in early December, his appendicitis flared up. He was forced to miss time and have surgery to remove his appendix. Playing in 12 of the Millionaires' 23 games, Taylor finished ninth overall in league scoring with 29 points and third in assists with 15.

At full health for the 1917–18 season, Taylor appeared in 18 games and finished first in goals (32) and points (43), and was second for assists (11); he was named the most valuable player of the league. Vancouver won the PCHA championship and travelled to Toronto to play the National Hockey League (NHL) champion, the Toronto Arenas, in the 1918 Stanley Cup Final. Though Taylor scored the most goals in the series (9) and the Millionaires outscored the Arenas (21 to 18), Toronto won the best-of-five series and the Cup. Taylor repeated as scoring champion of the PCHA in 1918–19, and for the first time led in goals (23), assists (13), and points (36). It marked the fifth and final time he led the PCHA in scoring.

After the end of the season, Taylor again announced his intention to retire, though he was back for the start of the 1919–20 season. A leg injury forced him out of several games, and he only played in ten, recording twelve points and finishing far behind the scoring leaders. This contributed to a third retirement announcement, which he insisted was final. However he was coaxed out of it by Frank Patrick, who ran the Millionaires and agreed to let Taylor play only in home games and only as a replacement player throughout the during 1920–21 season. (Note: At the time hockey players would play nearly the entire game without a break. See McKinley 2000, p. 126.) Taylor had five goals and one assist in the six games he played in and appeared in three of the five games Vancouver played in the Stanley Cup Final against the Senators, recording one assist. Ottawa won the Cup, and Taylor decided that he was retiring yet again. He sat out the 1921–22 season, but decided to attempt a return for the 1922–23 season. He appeared with Vancouver, then known as the Maroons, against the Victoria Cougars on December 8, 1922. Unable to keep pace with the game, Taylor decided after the one game to finally quit hockey.

=== Later career ===
Taylor remained involved in hockey after his playing career ended. He was the inaugural president of the Pacific Coast Hockey League, serving from 1936 to 1940. In 1970, he dropped the puck in the ceremonial face-off that preceded the Vancouver Canucks' first home game when the team joined the NHL. A season-ticket holder, Taylor was a fixture at Canucks games until his death.

== Life outside hockey ==
=== Immigration officer ===
In October 1907, Taylor joined the Immigration Branch of the Department of the Interior, a job that the Ottawa Senators arranged as an inducement to get Taylor to play with the club. Taylor liked the idea of a position within the federal government, seeing it as something that would ensure job security after his hockey career ended. He started as a junior clerk, earning $35 a month. When Taylor moved to Vancouver in 1912 he initially took a leave of absence from his position. Frank Patrick would later use his close connection with Sir Richard McBride, the Premier of British Columbia, to get Taylor's position transferred west, and helped Taylor get promoted to senior immigration inspector.

By 1914, Taylor oversaw traffic into the port of Vancouver, boarding ships and checking crew and passenger manifests. It was in this capacity that Taylor was involved in the Komagata Maru incident. The Komagata Maru was a steamship that carried 376 Sikh, Muslim, and Hindu immigrants from India in an attempt to circumvent the restrictive Canadian immigration laws which had been set up to keep non-Europeans from entering. The ship reached Vancouver on May 23, 1914, and Taylor was the first immigration officer to board the ship. Taylor spent considerable time on the ship as it sat in the Vancouver harbour. With the passengers unable to disembark and not given additional supplies, Taylor oversaw everyone until it left again for India on July 23, when the passengers were refused entry into Canada. Reflecting on the incident later in life, Taylor said that "[i]t was a terrible affair, and nobody was proud of it."

When the First World War broke out in August 1914, Taylor enlisted in the Canadian Army. Though reluctant to go overseas, he wanted to help out and was willing to do whatever was necessary. Shortly after his enlistment, it was announced that immigration officials were deemed a vital job and exempt from service. As a result, Taylor was discharged from the military and spent the war working in Vancouver.

After he retired from hockey, Taylor kept his immigration post and eventually rose to become the Commissioner of Immigration for British Columbia and the Yukon, the top position in the region. In 1946 Taylor was named as a Member of the Order of the British Empire for outstanding service to the country and community as an immigration officer in two wars. He retired from the civil service in 1950.

=== Politics ===
As a member of the B.C. Progressive Conservative party, Taylor unsuccessfully ran for election in the Vancouver Centre riding in the 1952 British Columbia general election, finishing fourth out of six candidates. He ran again in Vancouver Centre in the 1953 British Columbia general election, where he had 1,007 votes for 5.27% of the ballots, and again finished fourth of six candidates. In 1952 he was elected to one term as a member of the Vancouver Park Board.

== Personal life ==
Raised a Methodist, Taylor never drank alcohol, smoked cigarettes, or cursed, which was unusual for hockey players. He attributed these values to his mother's religious devotion. His family were staunch supporters of the federal Conservative Party, which caused some concerns when Taylor was offered a position in the federal government upon his move to Ottawa; many federal jobs were patronage appointments, and with the Liberal Party in power at the time it was unusual for a Conservative supporter to be given such a position. In the summer of 1908, Taylor helped found Scout troop No. 7 in Ottawa, starting a lifelong involvement with the Scouting movement. In Vancouver, he continued this work and took on an active role with the YMCA. Known for his "way with words" and "admired for his easy, courtly manner", Taylor also was known to be well-dressed throughout his playing career and continued to maintain this style in later life. Taylor is also reported to have been a Freemason.

Taylor enjoyed sports other than hockey and played lacrosse during the summers of his hockey career. While in Ottawa during the summer of 1908, he joined the Ottawa Capitals of the National Lacrosse Union. Taylor was seen as a good lacrosse player, though his biographer Eric Whitehead has suggested that Taylor's abilities may have been embellished by reporters due to his hockey fame. Overall, his time with the Capitals was uneventful except for an incident during a game on June 27, 1908. During the scuffle, Taylor got into a fight with a player and accidentally punched the referee, Tom Carlind. Police immediately arrested Taylor and jailed him for several hours until Carlind arrived and explained it was unintentional. League officials considered banning Taylor over the incident, but they let him play for the rest of the season because he drew large crowds. In 1914 he joined the Vancouver Terminals, playing for $50 per game.

=== Marriage and family ===
In February 1908 Taylor met Thirza Cook. A hockey fan, she worked as a secretary in the Immigration Department and met Taylor there after watching him play the previous night. After their first date, Taylor met Cook's widowed mother, who was from a well-off family and related by marriage to John Rudolphus Booth, an Ottawa lumber tycoon. Cook's mother was not impressed with Taylor, as his background was of a lower social standing than her own, and did not like the idea of her daughter being with a hockey player. This feeling was shared by Cook's six siblings. Despite this animosity, Taylor resolved to win the family over and decided he would save $10,000 to prove his worth. Earning a combined $2,800 from his two jobs at the time, Taylor needed six years to reach his goal. While playing in Renfrew, Taylor took a train to Ottawa several times per week to visit Cook. When he moved to Vancouver in 1912 he promised he would return for the spring and summer of 1913, initially planning for a wedding that autumn. Taylor and Cook were married on March 19, 1914, at her Ottawa home, with Frank Patrick serving as the best man. They went to New York on their honeymoon, where Taylor joined the Millionaires in an exhibition series. The couple moved to Vancouver after the series ended, spending the rest of their lives there. Thirza died in March 1963, from heart troubles.

Taylor had three sons and two daughters. John, the second oldest child, also played hockey and won two Canadian university championships while attending the University of Toronto. Offered a contract by the Toronto Maple Leafs of the NHL, he turned it down on the advice of his father and instead earned a law degree. John worked in immigration law before entering politics and was elected to the House of Commons in 1957, representing Vancouver—Burrard until his defeat in the 1962 election. In 1957 Taylor's oldest son, Fred Jr., opened a chain of sporting-goods stores and named them Cyclone Taylor Sports after his father. A grandson, Mark Taylor, played in the NHL from 1981 to 1986 with the Philadelphia Flyers, Pittsburgh Penguins and Washington Capitals. Joan, Taylor's youngest child, predeceased him, dying in 1976 from heart problems brought on by her figure skating career. After breaking his hip in 1978, Taylor's health deteriorated, and he died in his sleep in Vancouver on June 9, 1979.

== Legacy ==
Taylor was regarded as one of the best hockey players throughout his playing career and is considered the first star of the professional era. In 1908 when he went to play in Pittsburgh, it was noted in The Pittsburgh Press how he was "in a position to get almost anything he asked for the coming season and there were lots of bidders", and that his signing in Pittsburgh was a great achievement for the team. Likewise, when he left Ottawa in 1912 and moved to Vancouver, the Ottawa Citizen said he was "the greatest drawing card in the game" and that the Senators should have increased their salary offer to him. Taylor was of average size for a hockey player of his era, and was known more for speed and creativity than for his physical prowess. He was highly sought by teams, as his presence led to higher ticket sales. In an era when players only signed on for one season at a time, Taylor always had several teams interested in his services, and thus was able to command some of the highest salaries of his time.

In 1947, Taylor was elected into the Hockey Hall of Fame in its second class of inductees, and he was later inducted into the Canadian Sports Hall of Fame and the British Columbia Sports Hall of Fame. When the Hockey Hall of Fame started construction on a new building in 1961, Taylor was given the honour of turning the sod. There are several awards named after Taylor. The Vancouver Canucks team award for most valuable player is named the Cyclone Taylor Trophy. Since 1966 the Cyclone Taylor Cup has been awarded to the champion of a tournament between the winners of the British Columbia Junior B leagues. The junior Listowel Cyclones, based in Taylor's hometown, is named after him.

== Career statistics ==
=== Regular season and playoffs ===
| | | | Regular season | | | | | Playoffs |
| Season | Team | League | GP | G | A | Pts | PIM | GP | G | A | Pts | PIM |
|---|---|---|---|---|---|---|---|---|---|---|---|---|
| 1905–06 | Portage la Prairie | MHL | 4 | 3 | 1 | 4 | 0 | — | — | — | — | — |
| 1905–06 | Portage Lakes | IHL | 6 | 11 | 0 | 11 | 4 | — | — | — | — | — |
| 1906–07 | Portage Lakes | IHL | 23 | 18 | 7 | 25 | 31 | — | — | — | — | — |
| 1907–08 | Ottawa Senators | ECAHA | 10 | 9 | 0 | 9 | 40 | — | — | — | — | — |
| 1908–09 | Pittsburgh Athletic Club | WPHL | 3 | 0 | 0 | 0 | 0 | — | — | — | — | — |
| 1908–09 | Ottawa Senators | ECHA | 11 | 9 | 0 | 9 | 28 | — | — | — | — | — |
| 1909–10 | Renfrew Creamery Kings | NHA | 13 | 10 | 0 | 10 | 19 | — | — | — | — | — |
| 1910–11 | Renfrew Creamery Kings | NHA | 16 | 12 | 0 | 12 | 21 | — | — | — | — | — |
| 1911–12 | NHA All-Stars | Exhib. | 3 | 0 | 0 | 0 | 3 | — | — | — | — | — |
| 1912–13 | Vancouver Millionaires | PCHA | 14 | 10 | 8 | 18 | 5 | — | — | — | — | — |
| 1913–14 | Vancouver Millionaires | PCHA | 16 | 24 | 15 | 39 | 18 | — | — | — | — | — |
| 1914–15 | Vancouver Millionaires | PCHA | 16 | 23 | 22 | 45 | 9 | — | — | — | — | — |
| 1914–15 | Vancouver Millionaires | St-Cup | — | — | — | — | — | 3 | 8 | 2 | 10 | 3 |
| 1915–16 | Vancouver Millionaires | PCHA | 18 | 22 | 13 | 35 | 9 | — | — | — | — | — |
| 1916–17 | Vancouver Millionaires | PCHA | 12 | 14 | 15 | 29 | 12 | — | — | — | — | — |
| 1917–18 | Vancouver Millionaires | PCHA | 18 | 32 | 11 | 43 | 0 | 2 | 0 | 1 | 1 | 0 |
| 1917–18 | Vancouver Millionaires | St-Cup | — | — | — | — | — | 5 | 9 | 0 | 9 | 15 |
| 1918–19 | Vancouver Millionaires | PCHA | 20 | 23 | 13 | 36 | 12 | 2 | 1 | 0 | 1 | 0 |
| 1919–20 | Vancouver Millionaires | PCHA | 10 | 6 | 6 | 12 | 0 | 2 | 0 | 0 | 0 | 0 |
| 1920–21 | Vancouver Millionaires | PCHA | 6 | 5 | 1 | 6 | 0 | 2 | 0 | 0 | 0 | 0 |
| 1920–21 | Vancouver Millionaires | St-Cup | — | — | — | — | — | 3 | 0 | 1 | 1 | 5 |
| 1922–23 | Vancouver Maroons | PCHA | 1 | 0 | 0 | 0 | 0 | — | — | — | — | — |
| NHA totals | | | 29 | 22 | 0 | 22 | 40 | — | — | — | — | — |
| PCHA totals | | | 130 | 159 | 104 | 263 | 65 | 8 | 1 | 1 | 2 | 0 |
| Stanley Cup totals | | | — | — | — | — | — | 11 | 17 | 3 | 20 | 23 |
Source: Total Hockey (Note: Assist totals for pre-PCHA years are unofficial. See Diamond 2002, p. 610.)

== Awards and achievements ==
| Award | Year(s) |
|---|---|
| PCHA Scoring Champion | 1913–14, 1914–15, 1915–16, 1917–18, 1919 |
| PCHA All-Star Team | 1914, 1915 |
| PCHA Most Valuable Player | 1918 |
| Stanley Cup Champion | 1909 (Note: In 1909, Ottawa won the ECHA season championship, ahead of then-Cup holder Montreal Wanderers. Ottawa thus became the Stanley Cup holder/champion.), 1915 (Note: 1915 was the second post-season organized interleague competition, determining an annual Stanley Cup Champion, as compared to the previous challenge trophy era, when a team could issue a direct challenge to the existing Cup holder at any time during the season. For example, during the 1907–08 season, the Cup-holding Montreal Wanderers retained the Cup by defeating a challenger, continued to retain it by winning their league championship, then accepted challenges from two more teams – retaining the Cup both times.) |

== Records (1) ==
- Most goals, Stanley Cup Final Series (NHL era): 9 in the 1918 Stanley Cup Final (tied with Babe Dye and Frank Foyston)

== Bibliography ==
- Bowlsby, Craig H. (2012), Empire of Ice: The Rise and Fall of the Pacific Coast Hockey Association, 1911–1926, Vancouver: Knights of Winter, ISBN 978-0-9691705-6-3
- Coleman, Charles L. (1964), The Trail of the Stanley Cup, Volume 1: 1893–1926 inc., Dubuque, Iowa: Kendall/Hunt Publishing, OCLC 957132
- Cosentino, Frank (1990), The Renfrew Millionaires: The Valley Boys of Winter 1910, Burnstown, Ontario: General Store Publishing House, ISBN 0-919431-35-6
- Cyclone Taylor Cup (2019), Cyclone Taylor Cup: About, Cyclone Taylor Cup
- Diamond, Dan, ed. (2002), Total Hockey: The Official Encyclopedia of the National Hockey League (2nd ed.), New York: Total Sports Publishing, ISBN 1-892129-85-X
- Elections British Columbia (1988), Electoral History of British Columbia, 1871–1986, Victoria, BC: Queen's Printer for British Columbia, ISBN 0-7718-8677-2
- "Fred Taylor and Fred Lake Fired from P.A.C. Team of Hockey League", Pittsburgh Press, Pittsburgh, November 27, 1908
- "Fred Taylor to Play Here", Pittsburgh Press, Pittsburgh, November 11, 1908
- Grand Lodge of British Columbia and Yukon, Fred "Cyclone" Taylor O.B.E., Grand Lodge of British Columbia and Yukon
- Hardy, Stephen; Holman, Andrew C. (2018), Hockey: A Global History, Champaign: University of Illinois Press, ISBN 978-0-252-08397-6
- Hawthorn, Tom (March 15, 2002), "John Taylor: Former MP famous for his 'footsteps' campaign", The Globe and Mail, Toronto
- Hendriksen, Daniel (March 25, 2009), "Backchecking: Taylor Followed In Famous Grandfather's Footsteps", The Hockey News, Toronto
- "Hockey's Cyclone Taylor dies two weeks before 94th birthday", Ottawa Citizen, Ottawa, June 11, 1979
- Holzman, Morey; Nieforth, Joseph (2002), Deceptions and Doublecross: How the NHL Conquered Hockey, Toronto: Dundurn Press, ISBN 1-55002-413-2
- Kitchen, Paul (2008), Win, Tie, or Wrangle: The Inside Story of the Old Ottawa Senators 1883–1935, Manotick, Ontario: Penumbra Press, ISBN 978-1-897323-46-5
- "Lichtenhein's War with Patricks Reacts as Boomerang on N.H.A.", Ottawa Citizen, Ottawa, November 20, 1912
- Listowel Cyclones (2019), Fred Cyclone Taylor, Listowel Cyclones
- MacLeod, Alan Livingstone (2021), Capitals, Aristocrats, and Cougars: Victoria's Hockey Professionals, 1911–1926, Victoria: Heritage House, ISBN 978-1-77203-373-1
- Maniago, Stephanie; De Vera, Alfred; Boddez, Ben; Brumwell, Chris; Brown, Ben, eds. (2018), 2018–19 Vancouver Canucks Media Guide, Vancouver: Hemlock Printers
- Mason, Daniel S. (Spring 1998), "The International Hockey League and the Professionalization of Ice Hockey, 1904–1907", Journal of Sport History, 25 (1): 1–17
- McKinley, Michael (2000), Putting a Roof on Winter: Hockey's Rise from Sport to Spectacle, Vancouver: Greystone Books, ISBN 1-55054-798-4
- McKinley, Michael (2009), Hockey: A People's History, Toronto: McClelland & Stewart, ISBN 978-0-7710-5771-7
- "Ottawa Team Meet Waterloo; Outclassed By Renfrew 17 to 2", Ottawa Citizen, Ottawa, March 9, 1910
- Ross, J. Andrew (2015), Joining the Clubs: The Business of the National Hockey League to 1945, Syracuse, NY: Syracuse University Press, ISBN 978-0-8156-3383-9
- Shea, Kevin (May 8, 2012), Spotlight: One on One with Cyclone Taylor, Hockey Hall of Fame, archived from the original on May 11, 2019
- Sproule, William J. (2019), Houghton: The Birthplace of Professional Hockey, Calumet, Michigan: Copper Island Printing, ISBN 978-1-7330823-0-3
- "Supplement to the London Gazette", London Gazette, London, July 1, 1946
- "Taylor Refuses to Jump Contract Will Leave for Coast Saturday", Ottawa Citizen, Ottawa, November 21, 1912
- Whitehead, Eric (1977), Cyclone Taylor: A Hockey Legend, Toronto: Doubleday Canada, ISBN 0-385-13063-5
- Whitehead, Eric (1980), The Patricks: Hockey's Royal Family, Toronto: Doubleday Canada, ISBN 0-385-15662-6
- Wong, John Chi-Kit (2005), Lords of the Rinks: The Emergence of the National Hockey League 1875–1936, Toronto: University of Toronto Press, ISBN 0-8020-8520-2
- Wong, John Chi-Kit (2009), "Boomtown Hockey: The Vancouver Millionaires", in Wong, John Chi-Kit (ed.), Coast to Coast: Hockey in Canada to the Second World War, Toronto: University of Toronto Press, pp. 223–257, ISBN 978-0-8020-9532-9
- Young, Scott (1989), 100 Years of Dropping the Puck: A History of the OHA, Toronto: McClelland & Stewart, ISBN 0-7710-9093-5
- Zweig, Eric (2007), "Setting Cyclone's Story Straight", Hockey Research Journal, 11: 47–50
- Zweig, Eric (2018), Stanley Cup: The Complete History, Buffalo, New York: Firefly, ISBN 978-0-2281-0138-3
