= Montreal Westmount =

- City: Montreal, Quebec; Canada
- League: CAHL-I 1899–1911; CAHL (1905); SLSHL (1909–10); IPAHU (1910–1913); MCHL (1919–1921)

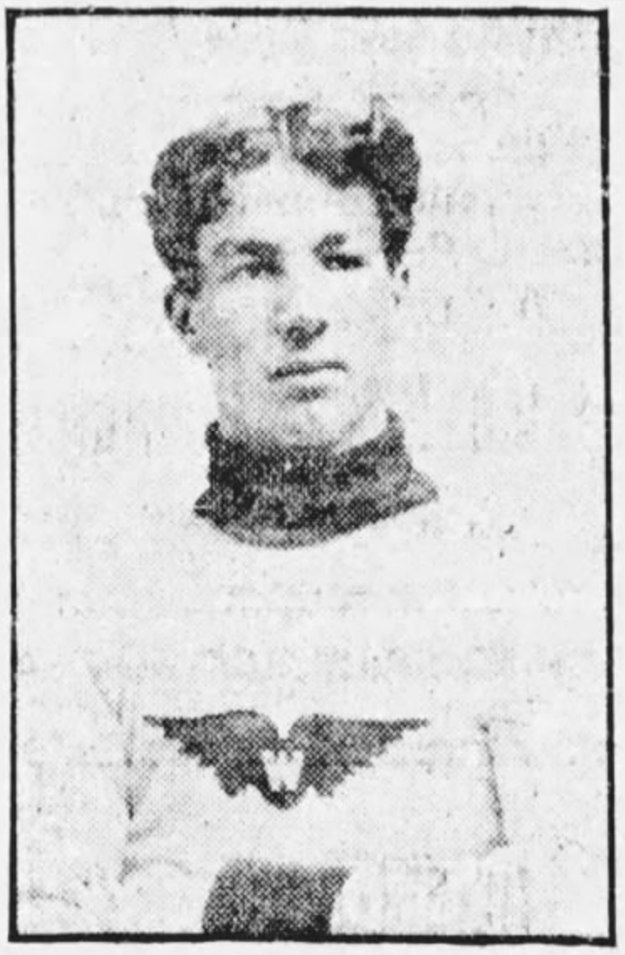
Art Ross with Montreal Westmount.

Montreal Westmount, or the Westmount Amateur Athletic Association, was a Canadian amateur ice hockey team from the Montreal suburb of Westmount. The Montreal Westmount played in various amateur leagues during the first decades of the 20th century, such as the Canadian Amateur Hockey League (1905), the Interprovincial Amateur Hockey Union (1910–1913), and the Montreal City Hockey League (1919–1921).

The Montreal Westmount organization also had teams in high school and junior leagues, and several early era greats in the sport went through the Westmount ranks before embarking on other careers, such as brothers Lester and Frank Patrick, Art Ross, and brothers Sprague and Odie Cleghorn. Also Hockey Hall of Fame referee Cooper Smeaton was a Montreal Westmount product.
