= Lester Patrick =

Canadian ice hockey player and coach (1883–1960)

- Hockey Hall of Fame, 1947
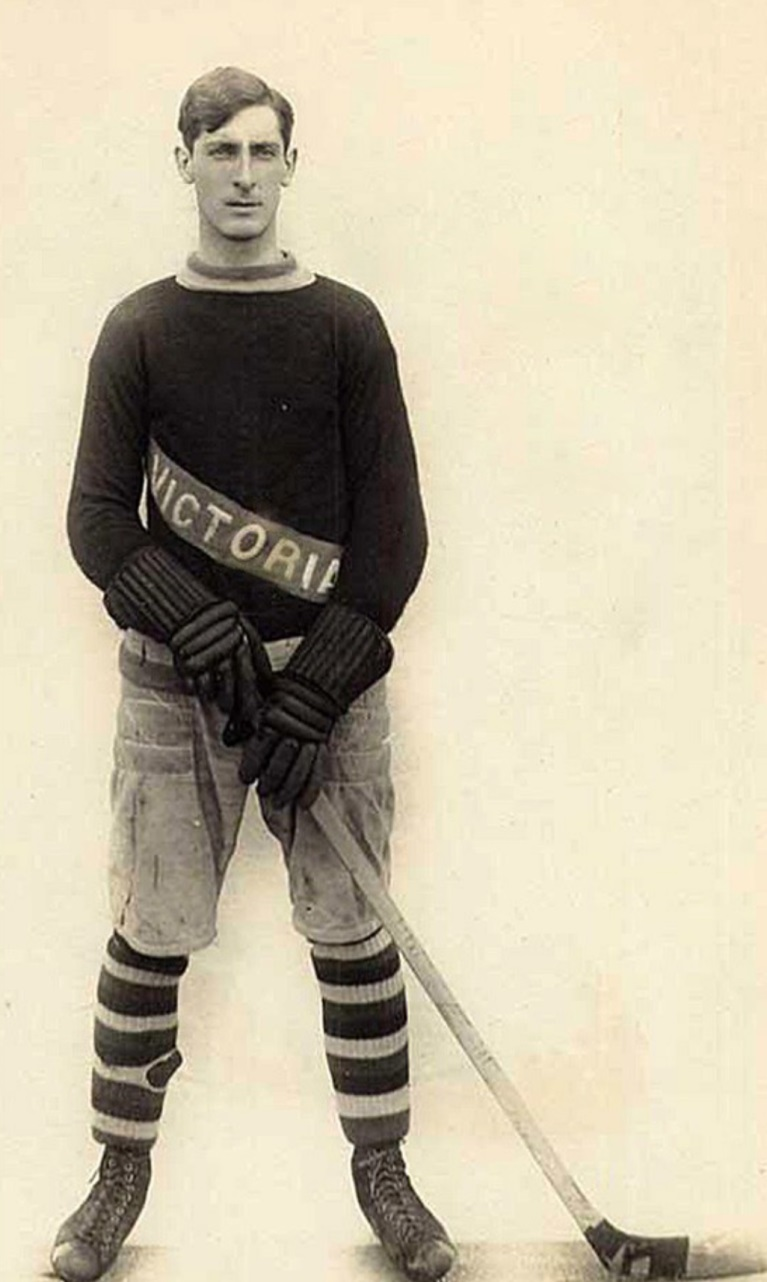
- Patrick in 1912, with the Victoria Aristocrats
- Born: December 31, 1883 Drummondville, Quebec, Canada
- Died: June 1, 1960 (aged 76) Victoria, British Columbia, Canada
- Height: 6 ft 1 in (185 cm)
- Weight: 180 lb (82 kg; 12 st 12 lb)
- Position: Defence
- Shot: Left
- Played for: New York Rangers; Victoria Cougars; Victoria Aristocrats; Seattle Metropolitans; Spokane Canaries; Renfrew Creamery Kings; Edmonton Pros; Montreal Wanderers; Brandon Wheat City
- Playing career: 1904–1928

Curtis Lester Patrick (December 31, 1883 – June 1, 1960) was a Canadian professional ice hockey player and coach associated with the Victoria Aristocrats/Cougars of the Pacific Coast Hockey Association (PCHA; Western Hockey League (WHL) after 1924), and the New York Rangers of the National Hockey League (NHL). Along with his brother Frank Patrick and father Joseph Patrick, he founded the PCHA and helped develop several rules for the game of hockey. Patrick won the Stanley Cup six times as a player, coach and manager.

Born in Drummondville, Quebec, Patrick moved to Montreal with his family at a young age and grew up there, and started playing hockey at this time while also working for his father's lumber company. Patrick first played for a top-level team in 1904 when he spent a season with the Brandon Hockey Club in Manitoba, and subsequently played three years in Montreal, winning the Stanley Cup with the Montreal Wanderers in both 1906 and 1907. Moving west to British Columbia with his family in 1907 Patrick played for a local team in Nelson, British Columbia, and was invited to join the Edmonton Hockey Club for a Cup challenge in 1908. Patrick and his brother Frank were lured back east in 1909 by promises of a large salary to join the Renfrew Creamery Kings of the National Hockey Association, though both returned to Nelson after one season with Renfrew.

In 1911 the brothers formed the PCHA, and Patrick owned, managed, coached, and played for the Victoria team. He led the team to a Cup challenge in 1914, and aside from one season with the Seattle Metropolitans in 1917–18 he was with the team until the league was sold off in 1926. While with Victoria he won the Cup again in 1925, the last team outside the National Hockey League (NHL) to do so. Along with Frank, Patrick would introduce many innovations in the PCHA that remain in hockey today, including the blue line, the penalty shot, and tracking assists, among others.

When the WHL, which the PCHA had been absorbed into in 1924, was sold to the NHL in 1926, Patrick was hired by the expansion New York Rangers to be their coach and manager. He led the team to Stanley Cup wins in 1928 and 1933, along with three further Finals appearances. He resigned as coach in 1939 though remained as manager, winning the Cup in that role again in 1940, before resigning from that role in 1946.

Patrick's sons Lynn and Muzz both played for him on the Rangers, and his grandsons Craig and Glenn also played in the NHL. Lynn, Muzz, and Craig all later coached and served as general managers in the NHL as well, while another grandson, Dick is an executive and part-owner of the Washington Capitals; in 2024, great-grandson Chris was named general manager of the Capitals. Patrick's contributions to hockey were recognized with his induction into the Hockey Hall of Fame in 1947, and he is also the namesake of the NHL's Lester Patrick Trophy, awarded for outstanding contributions to hockey in the United States, and the Patrick Division, which existed in the NHL from 1974 to 1993.

== Early life and career ==
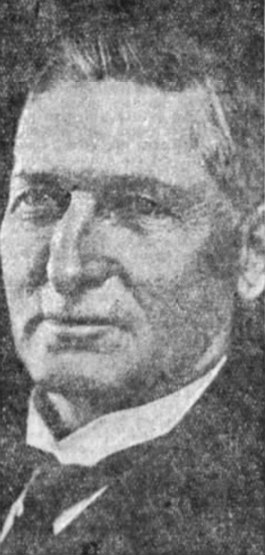
Lester Patrick's father Joe

Patrick's father, Joe, was the son of Irish immigrants: Thomas Patrick had emigrated from County Tyrone in Ireland to Canada in 1848 and settled in Quebec. Joe was born in 1857 and in 1883 married Grace Nelson. They moved to Drummondville, Quebec where Joe worked as a general store clerk and Grace was a schoolmarm. Drummondville was predominantly French-speaking and Catholic at the time, making the Anglophone and Methodist Patrick family a minority in the town. Patrick was born on December 31, 1883, in Drummondville, Quebec, the oldest child of Joe and Grace Patrick. (Note: There were six children in total: Lester, Frank, Lucinda, Edward, and Dora, and a girl who died in infancy.) In 1887 the family moved 9 miles (14 km) to Carmell Hill, where Joe bought a half-interest in a general store with William Mitchell. (Note: Mitchell later became a Canadian senator.) As in Drummondville the town was mainly Francophone, leading the family to learn French. Joe and his partners sold their store in 1892 earning a substantial profit of $10,000; Joe used his $5,000 to establish a lumber company and built a mill in Daveluyville, which was 60 miles (97 km) west of Quebec City. That winter Patrick and his younger brother Frank received their first pair of skates. In 1893 the family moved again, this time to Montreal, as Joe expanded his lumber company. They first lived in Pointe-Saint-Charles, a rail district, before moving to the more prosperous suburb of Westmount in 1895. While in Montreal the two older Patrick brothers were first introduced to ice hockey. They also met Art Ross at this time, who became a close friend of both brothers and had an extensive career in hockey. Patrick developed into a strong hockey player and would frequently be invited as a ringer to play in important games.

In 1901 Patrick enrolled in McGill University. He played basketball in his first semester as a student, and subsequently joined the hockey team. He was also invited to tryout for the Montreal Shamrocks, a top senior team in the city; however as this would have meant leaving the university, Patrick declined the offer, following the advice of his father. Even so Patrick only studied at McGill for one year before he withdrew. He was more focused on playing sports than studying, and so Joe decided to have Patrick start working for the family business. After initially working in an office role, within a year Patrick was promoted to a branch manager. The company was downsized though and so in June 1903 Patrick decided to move to Calgary in Western Canada in an effort to work on cattle ranches. Upon arriving in Calgary he found the lifestyle was not suitable for him, and instead joined the Canadian Pacific Railway as a rodman and chainman on a survey gang, working until the autumn of that year.

On his way back to Montreal, Patrick stopped in Brandon, Manitoba. He had friends there playing hockey, and was offered spot with the team for $25 per month to cover expenses. He played as cover-point (Note: Point and cover-point were early versions of defencemen, and were not expected to contribute much to offensive actions.) for the season. While points and cover-points were not expected to contribute much to offensive actions, Patrick tried to carry the puck up the ice during a game, scoring a goal. While the club questioned his motive, he argued that it was successful, and the fans enjoyed it, so was allowed to keep doing so. He also advocated for the two defenders to line up side-by-side, rather than one in front of the other as had been the standard since the beginning of hockey; this change was adopted by the team and soon widely adopted in hockey. Brandon challenged the Ottawa Senators for the Stanley Cup in that season, but were defeated in the two-game, total-goal series. After the season Patrick returned to Montreal, arriving by March 1904.

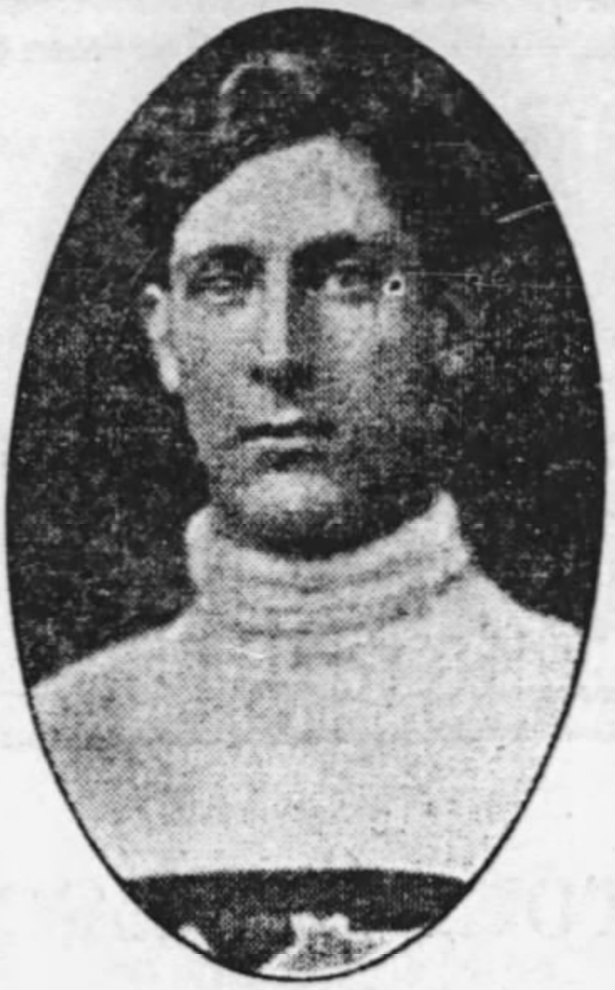
Patrick with the Nelson Hockey Club in 1909

Patrick played the 1904–05 season with Montreal Westmount in the Canadian Amateur Hockey League (CAHL), then the top level league in Canadian hockey. In eight games Patrick had four goals. While back from school during a break in 1905, Frank briefly joined the Montreal Westmount club and played two games; this marked the first time the brothers played together. Preoccupied with work commitments for his father, Patrick frequently missed team workouts and the team did not perform very well. The CAHL was disbanded prior to the start of the 1905–06 season and replaced by a new league, the Eastern Canada Amateur Hockey Association (ECAHA). Patrick joined the Montreal Wanderers, who were admitted to the new league, scoring 17 goals in nine games for them. The Wanderers finished in a tie with Ottawa for first in the league, leading to a two game, total goal playoff was played for the league championship. The Wanders won the series 12 goals to 10, with Patrick scoring the final two goals in the last minutes of the second game, and were thus also awarded the Stanley Cup. The following season the Wanderers again finished first in the ECAHA, though lost the Cup in a challenge against the Kenora Thistles, champions of the Manitoba Hockey Association, in January 1907. In a rematch series in March 1907 the Wanderers defeated Kenora to again win the Cup. Patrick had scored 11 goals in nine regular season games, and a further 10 goals in six Cup challenge games.

In 1907 Joe purchased a tract of land in the Slocan Valley in southeastern British Columbia (BC), and moved the family west to Nelson, British Columbia, a town near the land, to start a new lumber company there. Frank remained in Montreal to complete his studies, as he had one year remaining. In Nelson Patrick played for a local hockey team, scoring 22 goals in 6 games during the 1908–09 season.

During the season Patrick also accepted an offer to join the Edmonton Hockey Club of the Alberta Amateur Hockey Association for their upcoming Cup challenge against his former team, the Wanderers. The team had signed several high-profile players from Eastern Canada to play for the team in the challenge; only two players on the team were from Edmonton, with the rest coming from the east. Patrick and Tommy Phillips, who had played for Kenora, never even reached Edmonton; they met their team in Winnipeg on its way east for the Cup challenge. Edmonton lost the two game, total-goal series 14–9, with Patrick scoring one goal. While other players were paid several hundred dollars for the series, (Note: Phillips, who broke his ankle in the first game and sat out the second, was paid $600.) Patrick was given $100 for expenses. In a story he told years later, Patrick noted that after informing his father he only spent $62, he was ordered to reimburse the Edmonton club the remaining $38; Patrick would claim this "must have been the first and last time in history that a hockey player ever returned any part of his expense money."

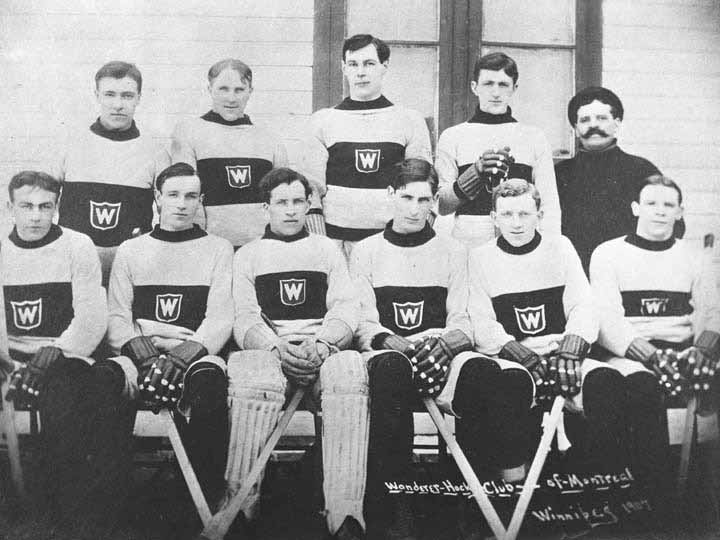
The Montreal Wanderers during the Stanley Cup challenge in 1907, in which the team would defeat the Kenora Thistles. Patrick is in the front row, third from right.

The following year a new top-level league, the National Hockey Association (NHA), was established; unlike the ECHA, (Note: The ECAHA renamed itself the ECHA in 1908, dropping the word "Amateur".) the NHA was openly professional. Several teams began to send offers to both Patrick brothers, who had decided to return east for the winter and play hockey there. Among the teams making offers were the Renfrew Creamery Kings, owned by J. Ambrose O'Brien, a wealthy mining magnate, and when Patrick received the offer he replied saying he would join the team for $3,000, an exorbitant salary for the era. Surprised by the offer, Patrick asked for his brother Frank as well, and Frank was offered $2,000 to join the team.

Along with other high-profile players, most famously Cyclone Taylor, who signed for a reported $5,250, (Note: The figure $5,250 comes from Whitehead's biography of Taylor. However Cosentino has suggested the base salary was closer to $2,000, with the rest coming from a guaranteed salary outside of hockey and a bond to ensure he would sign. Regardless, Taylor had the highest salary in hockey history. See Whitehead 1977, pp. 105–106 and Cosentino 1990, p. 73.) the team was nicknamed the "Millionaires". Along with several teammates, the Patricks lived in a boarding house in Renfrew during the season, and players were often seen together about town. Patrick was the more out-spoken of the brothers, with Frank being quiet and reserved, though his demeanor changed when the topic of hockey came up. He became quite lively and was open about his ideas on how to improve the game, and what type of tactics could be used. Taylor would later recall he was quite impressed by the brothers knowledge and views, stating that "Frank in particular had an amazing grasp of the science of hockey, and they were both already dreaming about changes that would improve the game".

== Pacific Coast Hockey Association ==
Joe sold his lumber company in January 1911, making a profit of around $440,000, of which he gave both Lester and Frank $25,000. In a separate transaction Joe also sold a private interest he had, earning a further $35,000. With this money Joe solicited ideas from his family on what to invest in, and Frank suggested they establish their own hockey league, one based in BC and that they controlled. It was put to a vote, with both Joe and Frank voting in favour and Lester against, so they agreed to move forward, and the family moved to Victoria, British Columbia. They incorporated the new league, the Pacific Coast Hockey Association (PCHA), on December 7, 1911.

The initial plan was to place teams in large cities in Western Canada, with one each in Vancouver and Victoria (both in BC), and one in Edmonton and Calgary (both in Alberta). Issues in finding support for the Alberta-based teams meant that the new league would only be based in BC initially. The mild weather on the West Coast meant that unlike Central and Eastern Canada natural ice could not be used for games, and so the Patrick family built two arenas: the Denman Arena in Vancouver and the Patrick Arena in Victoria. While the arenas were being built Patrick went east to recruit players, offering up to twice the salary they were making in the NHA to join the new league, and was able to recruit several high-profile names. Patrick managed and played for the Victoria team, (Note: The Victoria team would be known variously as the "Capitals", "Aristocrats", and "Cougars" during its existence.) while Frank would do the same for the Vancouver team. (Note: The team would later be known as the "Millionaires".) Patrick played all 16 games for the team in the inaugural 1912 season, finishing tied for third on the team in scoring with 10 goals. At a height of 6 ft 1 in (1.85 m) and weight of 180 pounds (82 kg) Patrick was larger than many other hockey players of the era, and historian Alan Livingstone MacLeod notes that in team photos Patrick was "at least half a head taller than the other players".

Buoyed by an influx of players from the east (16 of the 23 players in the PCHA's first season had played in the NHA previously), the league did well and demonstrated early it could be a serious challenger to the supremacy of the NHA.

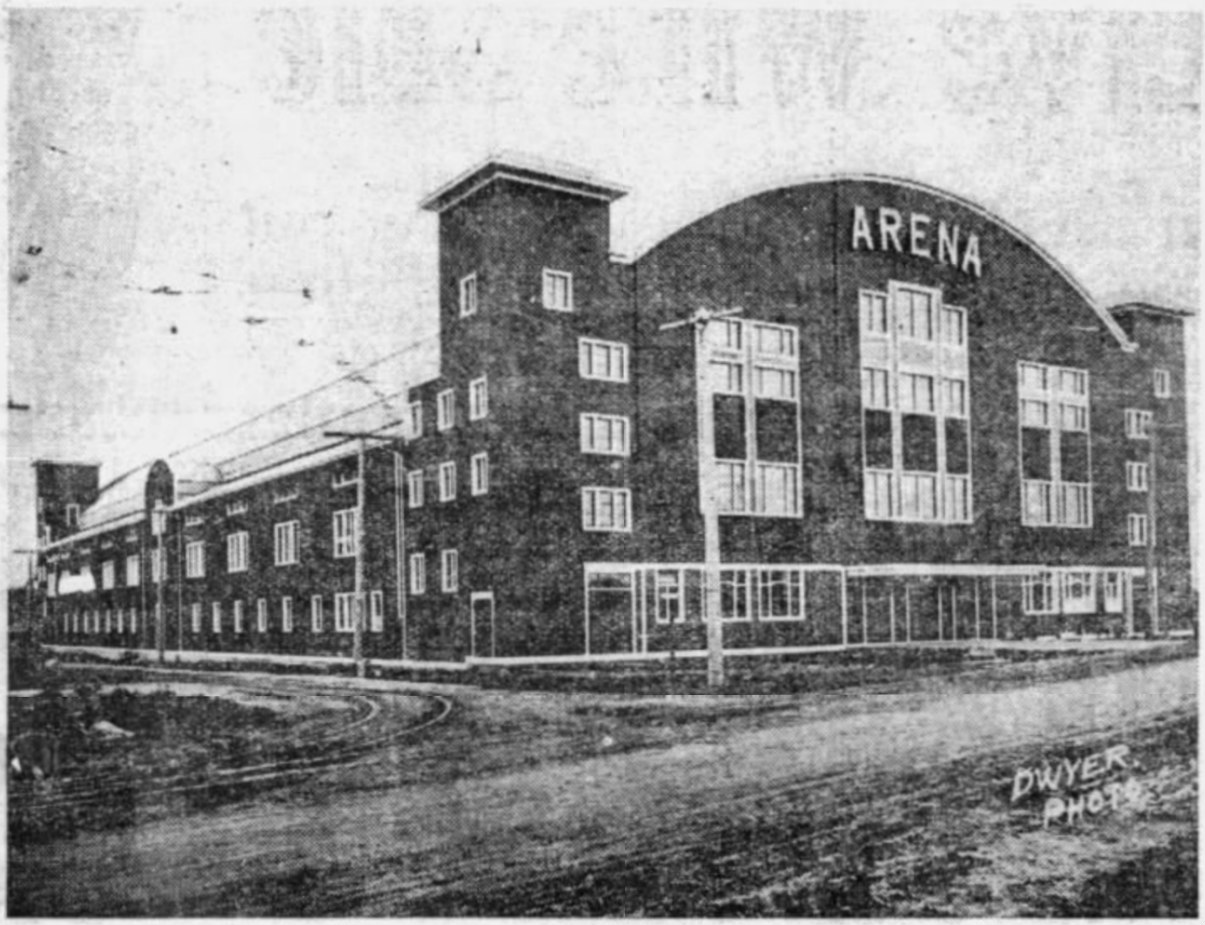
The Patrick Arena in 1912. It was built and owned by the Patrick family, it hosted three games of the 1925 Stanley Cup Final. It burned down in 1929.

Prior to the start of the 1913–14 Patrick broke a bone in his left arm, keeping him from playing until mid-way through the season, though he continued to serve as coach. Victoria started the season badly, but with Patrick returning they finished strong and won the league championship, with 10 wins in 16 games. Patrick played eight of the games, and had ten points. With a new agreement reached between the PCHA and NA, Victoria played the NHA champions, the Toronto Blueshirts, for the Cup. The teams played a best-of-five series, which Toronto won 3 games to 0. Patrick played all three games and had two goals.

In January 1916 the Victoria Arena was commandeered by the Canadian military for use as a training facility for new recruits. Prior to the 1916–17 Patrick moved his team from Victoria to Spokane, Washington, where they were renamed the Spokane Canaries. The reason for the move is not clear, though MacLeod speculates that Patrick thought the military may allow the team to continue to use it, which was not to be the case. After that season the Canaries were disbanded, and Patrick joined the Stanley Cup champion Seattle Metropolitans.

The Aristocrats were revived in 1918 as the Victoria Cougars, and Patrick took over as player-manager. Despite playing in only about half the games, he retired as a player after the 1922 season. Remaining with the Cougars as head coach, Patrick became the last non-NHL coach to win the Stanley Cup in 1925.

In January 1926 Patrick returned to the ice for the Cougars in an effort to help the team, which was playing poorly.

== New York Rangers ==
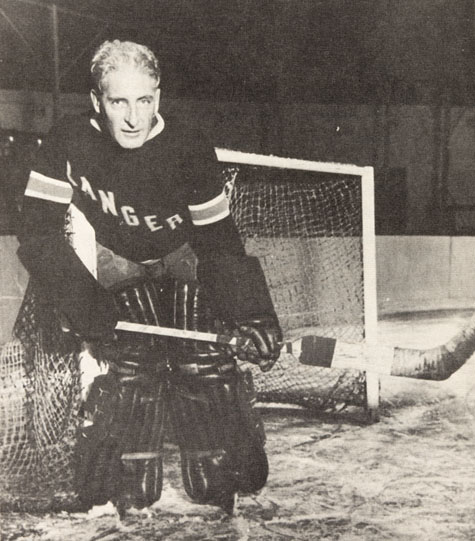
Lester Patrick serving as goaltender during the 1928 Stanley Cup Final

By the early 1920s the PCHA was losing money. Seattle folded in 1924, and with only two teams left (Vancouver and Victoria), the Patricks decided to merge with the Western Canada Hockey League, which was renamed the Western Hockey League (WHL). The WHL continued for two seasons until 1926, though with continued financial difficulties and expansion plans by the NHL (which would add three teams between 1924 and 1926, growing to ten teams overall) it was clear the league would not be sustainable. With the consent of five of the six WHL teams (Note: Saskatoon had an agreement to sell its players to the Montreal Maroons.) Frank met with the NHL and offered to sell the rights to WHL players to the league for a lump sum, allowing the NHL to quickly stock the expansion teams being set up. This was agreed to, and for $100,000 the Victoria team was transferred to Detroit, (who named themselves the Detroit Cougars in recognition). (Note: They would later be renamed the Falcons, and finally Red Wings.) The Chicago team, later named the Black Hawks, also paid $100,000 for players, receiving the Portland Rosebuds. The Boston Bruins, whose owner Charles Adams and manager Art Ross had helped facilitate the sale, also purchased select players, paying a total of $17,000, netting the WHL owners a total of $267,000.

In October 1926 Patrick was offered the position of coach with the New York Rangers, another expansion team in the NHL. Shortly after he was also named the team's general manager, replacing Conn Smythe. He played one regular season game for the Rangers, on March 20, 1927, serving as a substitute defenceman against the New York Americans.

He is famous for an incident which occurred on April 7, 1928, during Game 2 of the 1928 Stanley Cup Final against the Montreal Maroons. After starting goaltender Lorne Chabot suffered an eye injury when he was hit by the puck in the middle of the second period, Patrick inserted himself into the game as the Rangers' new netminder, telling the players "Boys, don't let an old man down." At the age of 44 years, 99 days, Patrick remains the oldest man to have played in the Stanley Cup Finals. At the time it was not common for teams to have a backup goaltender, and the opposing team's coach had to allow a substitute goaltender. However, Maroons manager-coach Eddie Gerard refused to give permission for the Rangers to use Alec Connell, the Ottawa Senators' netminder who was in the stands, as well as minor-leaguer Hugh McCormick. Odie Cleghorn, the coach of the Pittsburgh Pirates, stood in for Patrick as coach for the remainder of the game, and directed the Rangers to check fiercely at mid-ice which limited the Maroon players to long harmless shots. Patrick saved 18 to 19 shots while allowing one goal in helping the Rangers to an overtime victory. For the next three games, the league gave permission for the Rangers to use Joe Miller from the New York Americans in goal. The Rangers went on to win the Stanley Cup, their first in franchise history.

The Rangers played in the Stanley Cup Final in 1929, and again in 1932, though lost both years. They won a second Stanley Cup championship in 1933, defeating the Toronto Maple Leafs. Patrick coached the team to the Finals once more in 1937, though they lost. He resigned as coach in 1939 and was replaced by Frank Boucher, remaining as general manager of the Rangers and serving as an assistant coach to Boucher.

Patrick won the Cup for the final time in 1940 when the Rangers, coached by Boucher, defeated Toronto. However the onset of the Second World War in 1939 had depleted the Rangers, who saw many players enlist in the armed forces of both Canada and the United States. This led to tension between Patrick and Boucher, and with the team continuing to lose Patrick resigned as general manager on February 22, 1946, replaced by Boucher, who took on the dual role of coach and general manager. He stayed on as vice president of Madison Square Garden, finally retiring in 1950. Patrick had also briefly assumed an executive position in the NHL in early 1943: league president Frank Calder collapsed at a board meeting in January, and until his replacement Red Dutton was able to assume the role in May, Patrick and E.W. Bickle of Toronto oversaw the league.

== Later life and legacy ==
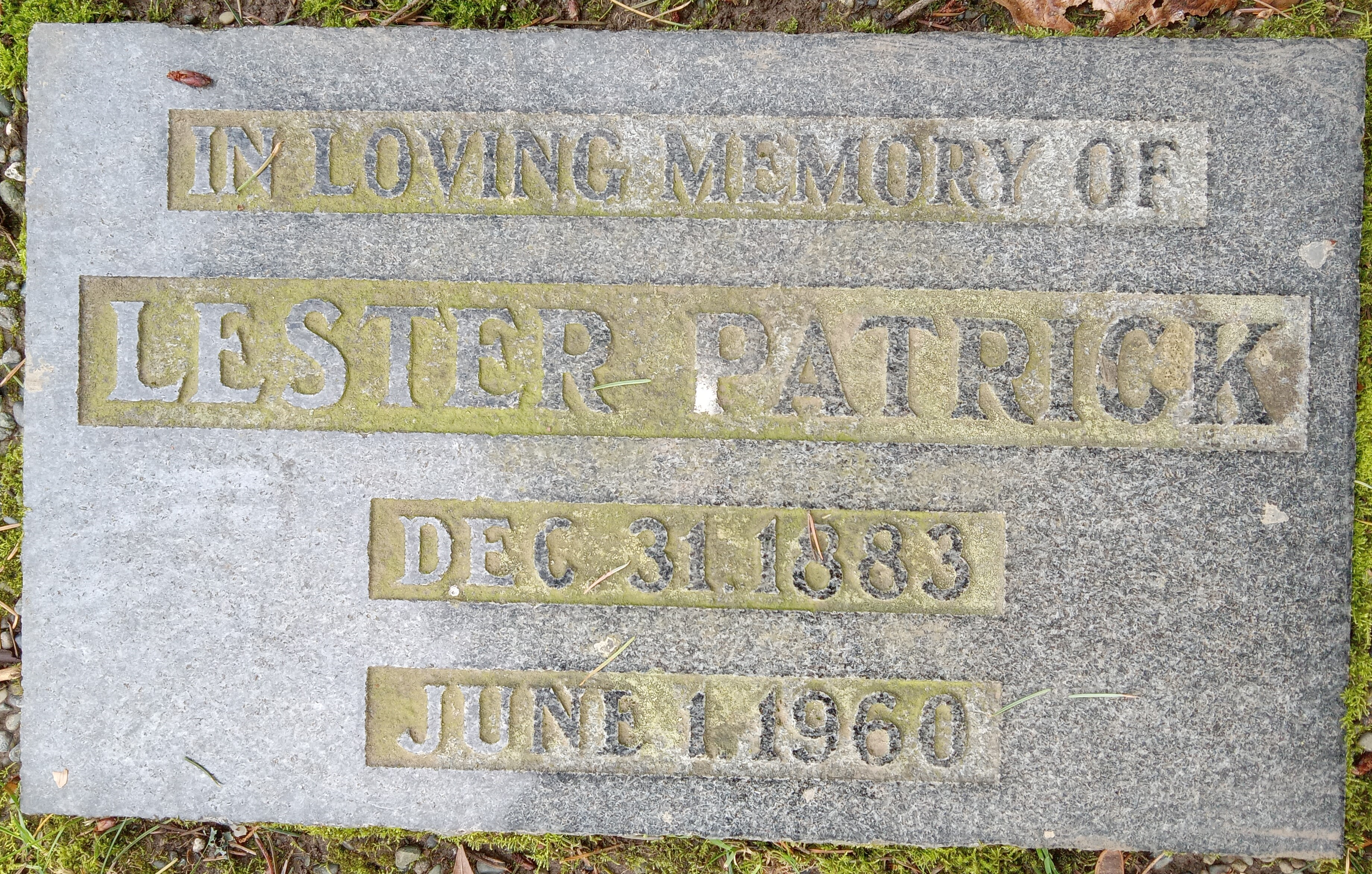
Patrick's grave marker

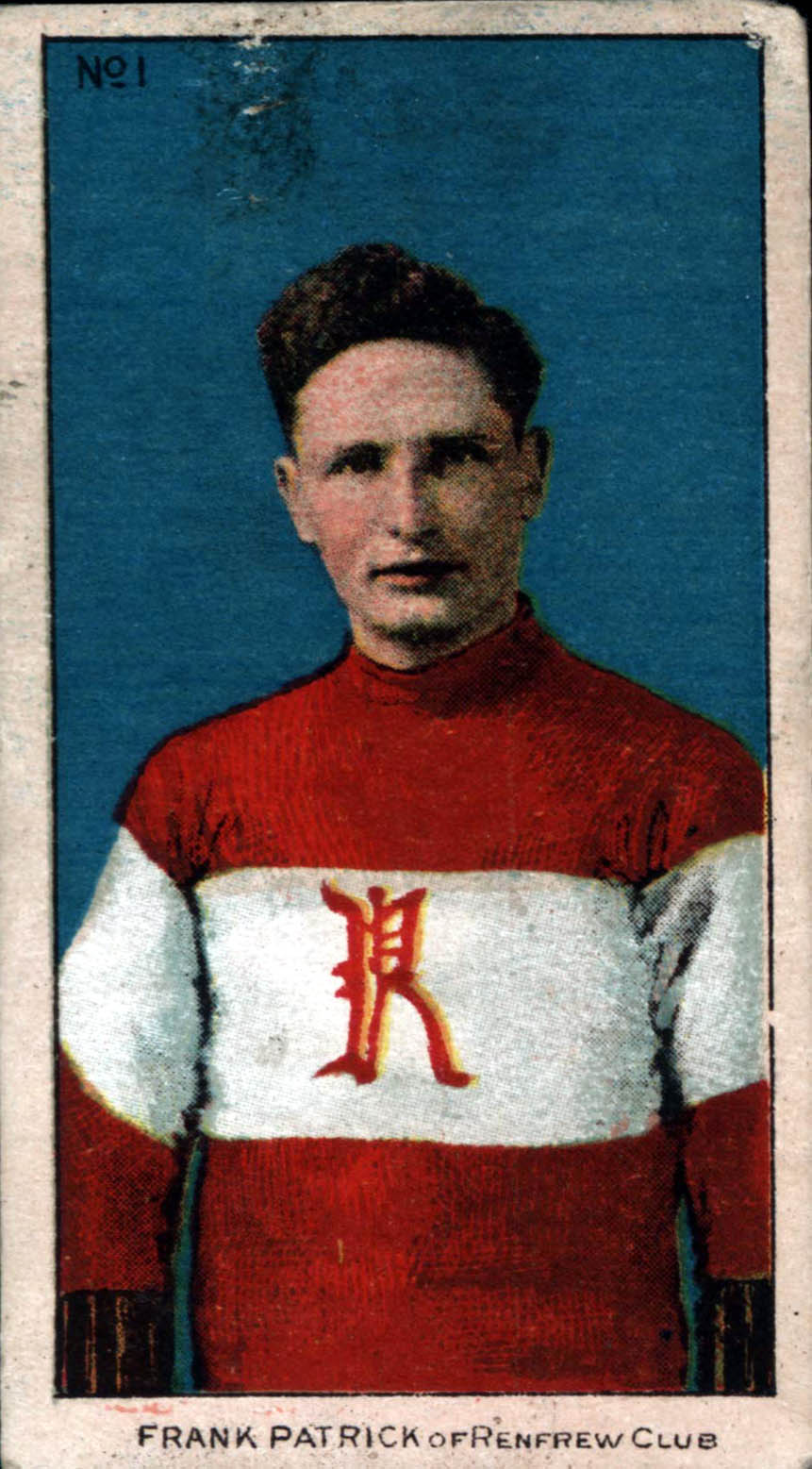
Frank Patrick with the Renfrew Creamery Kings on a hockey card, circa 1910–12. The Patrick brothers introduced the blue line, the penalty shot, and tracking assists, among others.

Patrick developed lung cancer, and his health quickly deteriorated. He died in Victoria after a heart attack on June 1, 1960, aged 76. He was interred in the family plot at the Royal Oak Burying Park. Exactly four weeks later, he was followed by his brother Frank, who was 74; Frank's death was also attributed to a heart attack.

The Lester Patrick Trophy, awarded for outstanding contributions to hockey in the United States, is named for him. He was also the namesake of the Patrick Division, one of the former divisions of the NHL teams. The championships trophy of the Western Hockey League, the Lester Patrick Cup, was renamed after Patrick upon his death in 1960. He was inducted into the Hockey Hall of Fame in 1947.

As a coach Patrick described his philosophy to reporters: "It is incumbent upon you initially to build up their morale and then maintain it, and before you do that you must have acquired their confidence in your judgement, and you must know the man." He was known to be patient with players, and while he would go onto the ice to show plays, he let the players work on it, aware that it took time for some to learn.

The Patrick brothers created many new rules for hockey, and at least 22 remain in the NHL rulebook to this day. They introduced the blue line, the forward pass, and the playoff system, a change adopted by other leagues and sports around the world. After a suggestion by their father Joe, they began using numbers on players' sweaters and in programs to help fans identify the skaters. A new rule allowed the puck to be kicked everywhere but into the net, and allowed goaltenders to fall to the ice to make a save. They were responsible for crediting assists when a goal was scored, and invented the penalty shot.

With the Rangers Patrick also became an early advocate of the farm team system, in which the parent team sponsored several minor and junior teams in order to retain their playing rights. This allowed teams like the Rangers, who did not have many local players, to acquire talent from other regions, and kept competing teams from signing all the players. The Rangers developed an extensive system in this way, including forming a new league, the Eastern Amateur Hockey League, which had teams in the New York region. In 1933 Patrick started hosting Rangers' training camps in Winnipeg, in a further effort to expand the search for talent beyond the provinces of Ontario and Quebec where the NHL's two Canadian teams (the Toronto Maple Leafs and Montreal Canadiens) were located.

The Patricks have been dubbed "Hockey's Royal Family". Patrick's son, Lynn and grandson Craig were both inducted into the Hockey Hall of Fame. Another son, Muzz, was a player and eventually coach and general manager of the Rangers. Another grandson, Glenn, played in the NHL during parts of the 1970s while another grandson, Dick (Muzz's son) has been an executive and minority owner of the Washington Capitals since 1982. Great-grandson Chris, the son of Dick, was named general manager of the Capitals in 2024.

Patrick also played a role in the early development of women's hockey. In Nelson his sisters Myrtle, Cynda and Dora were associated with the Nelson Ladies Hockey Club, and in 1911 Patrick would coach the team. In January 1916, the Patrick brothers talked of forming a women's league to complement the PCHA and occupy dates for their arenas in Vancouver and Victoria. The proposal included teams from Vancouver, Victoria, Portland, and Seattle. The league never formed but in January 1917, the Vancouver News-Advertiser reported that wives of the Seattle Metropolitans had assembled a team. In February 1921, Frank announced a women's international championship series that would be played in conjunction with the PCHA. A series of games were held over that month with teams from Seattle, Vancouver, and Victoria, playing during intermissions of PCHA games. Both Seattle and Victoria's teams disbanded after the series, and the proposed women's league was not further developed.

== Awards and achievements ==
- Stanley Cup champion (6): 1906, 1907 as a player; 1925, 1928, 1933, 1940 as an owner/manager/coach

== Career statistics ==
=== Regular season and playoffs ===
			Regular season					Playoffs
Season	Team	League	GP	G	A	Pts	PIM	GP	G	A	Pts	PIM
1903–04	Brandon HC	MNWHA	12	4	2	6	—	—	—	—	—	—
1903–04	Brandon HC	St-Cup	—	—	—	—	—	2	0	0	0	0
1904–05	Montreal Westmount	CAHL	8	4	0	4	—	—	—	—	—	—
1905–06	Montreal Wanderers	ECAHA	9	17	0	17	26	2	3	0	3	3
1906–07	Montreal Wanderers	ECAHA	9	11	0	11	11	—	—	—	—	—
1906–07	Montreal Wanderers	St-Cup	—	—	—	—	—	6	10	0	10	32
1907–08	Nelson Seniors	BCHL	—	—	—	—	—	2	1	0	1	—
1908–09	Edmonton HC	Exhib	1	1	0	1	3	—	—	—	—	—
1908–09	Nelson Pros	Exhib	2	4	0	4	3	—	—	—	—	—
1908–09	Edmonton HC	St-Cup	—	—	—	—	—	2	1	1	2	3
1909–10	Renfrew Creamery Kings	NHA	12	24	0	24	25	—	—	—	—	—
1911–12	Victoria Senators	PCHA	16	10	0	10	9	—	—	—	—	—
1912–13	Victoria Senators	PCHA	15	14	5	19	12	—	—	—	—	—
1913–14	Victoria Aristocrats	PCHA	9	5	5	10	0	—	—	—	—	—
1913–14	Victoria Aristocrats	St-Cup	—	—	—	—	—	3	2	0	2	—
1914–15	Victoria Aristocrats	PCHA	17	12	5	17	15	—	—	—	—	—
1915–16	Victoria Aristocrats	PCHA	18	13	11	24	27	—	—	—	—	—
1916–17	Spokane Canaries	PCHA	23	10	11	21	15	—	—	—	—	—
1917–18	Seattle Metropolitans	PCHA	17	2	8	10	15	2	0	1	1	0
1918–19	Victoria Aristocrats	PCHA	9	2	5	7	0	—	—	—	—	—
1919–20	Victoria Aristocrats	PCHA	11	2	2	4	3	—	—	—	—	—
1920–21	Victoria Aristocrats	PCHA	5	2	3	5	13	—	—	—	—	—
1921–22	Victoria Aristocrats	PCHA	2	0	0	0	0	—	—	—	—	—
1925–26	Victoria Cougars	WHL	23	5	8	13	20	2	0	0	0	2
1926–27	New York Rangers	NHL	1	0	0	0	2	—	—	—	—	—
1927–28	New York Rangers	NHL	—	—	—	—	—	1	0	0	0	0
PCHA totals			142	72	55	127	109	2	0	1	1	0
NHL totals			1	0	0	0	2	1	0	0	0	0
St-Cup totals			—	—	—	—	—	13	13	1	14	—

- Stats from Total Hockey

=== Coaching record ===
			Regular season					Playoffs
Season	Team	League	GC	W	L	T	Finish	GC	W	L	T	Result
1912	Victoria Senators	PCHA	16	7	9	0	3rd	–	—	—	—	–
1912–13	Victoria Senators	PCHA	15	10	5	0	1st	–	—	—	—	–
1913–14	Victoria Aristocrats	PCHA	15	10	5	0	1st	3	0	3	0	Lost Stanley Cup series
1914–15	Victoria Aristocrats	PCHA	17	4	13	0	3rd	—	—	—	—	—
1915–16	Victoria Aristocrats	PCHA	18	5	13	0	4th	—	—	—	—	—
1916–17	Spokane Canaries	PCHA	23	8	15	0	4th	—	—	—	—	—
1917–18	Seattle Metropolitans	PCHA	18	11	7	0	1st	2	0	1	1	Lost in Final
1918–19	Victoria Aristocrats	PCHA	20	7	13	0	3rd	—	—	—	—	—
1919–20	Victoria Aristocrats	PCHA	22	10	12	0	3rd	—	—	—	—	—
1920–21	Victoria Aristocrats	PCHA	24	10	13	1	3rd	—	—	—	—	—
1921–22	Victoria Aristocrats	PCHA	24	11	12	1	3rd	—	—	—	—	—
1922–23	Victoria Cougars	PCHA	30	16	14	0	2nd	2	1	1	0	Lost in Final
1923–24	Victoria Cougars	PCHA	30	11	18	1	3rd	—	—	—	—	—
1924–25	Victoria Cougars	WCHL	28	16	12	0	3rd	8	5	1	2	Won Stanley Cup
1925–26	Victoria Cougars	WHL	30	15	11	4	3rd	7	2	3	2	Lost in Stanley Cup Finals
1926–27	New York Rangers	NHL	44	25	13	6	1st, American	2	0	1	1	Lost in semi-final
1927–28	New York Rangers	NHL	44	19	16	9	2nd, American	9	5	3	1	Won Stanley Cup
1928–29	New York Rangers	NHL	44	21	13	10	2nd, American	6	3	2	1	Lost in Final
1929–30	New York Rangers	NHL	44	17	17	10	3rd, American	4	1	2	1	Lost semi-final
1930–31	New York Rangers	NHL	44	19	16	9	3rd, American	4	2	2	0	Lost in semi-final
1931–32	New York Rangers	NHL	48	23	17	8	1st, American	7	3	4	—	Lost in Final
1932–33	New York Rangers	NHL	48	23	17	8	3rd, American	8	6	1	1	Won Stanley Cup
1933–34	New York Rangers	NHL	48	21	19	8	3rd, American	2	0	1	1	Lost in quarter-final
1934–35	New York Rangers	NHL	48	22	20	6	3rd, American	4	1	1	2	Lost in semi-final
1935–36	New York Rangers	NHL	48	19	17	12	4th, American	—	—	—	—	—
1936–37	New York Rangers	NHL	48	19	20	9	3rd, American	9	6	3	—	Lost in Final
1937–38	New York Rangers	NHL	48	27	15	6	2nd, American	3	1	2	—	Lost in quarter-final
1938–39	New York Rangers	NHL	48	26	16	6	2nd, NHL	7	3	4	—	Lost in semi-final
PCHA totals			272	120	149	3	—	7	1	5	1
WCHL/WHL totals			58	31	23	4	—	15	7	4	4	One Stanley Cup Win
NHL totals			604	281	216	107	—	65	31	26	8	Two Stanley Cup Wins

== See also ==
- List of family relations in the NHL
- Patrick Arena

== Bibliography ==
- Anderson, Dave (April 3, 1961), "The day the coach played goalie", Sports Illustrated, vol. 14, no. 3, pp. M3–M4
- Blumenstock, Kathy (October 5, 1982), "Patrick Is Part Of Capitals' 'Fresh Start'", Washington Post, Washington
- Boucher, Frank; Frayne, Trent (1973), When the Rangers Were Young, New York City: Dodd, Mead & Company, ISBN 0-396-06852-9
- Bowlsby, Craig H. (2012), Empire of Ice: The Rise and Fall of the Pacific Coast Hockey Association, 1911–1926, Vancouver: Knights of Winter, ISBN 978-0-9691705-6-3
- Coleman, Charles L. (1964), The Trail of the Stanley Cup, Volume 1: 1893–1926 inc., Dubuque, Iowa: Kendall/Hunt Publishing, OCLC 957132
- Cosentino, Frank (1990), The Renfrew Millionaires: The Valley Boys of Winter 1910, Burnstown, Ontario: General Store Publishing House, ISBN 0-919431-35-6
- Diamond, Dan, ed. (2003), Total Hockey: The Official Encyclopedia of the National Hockey League, Second Edition, New York: Total Sports Publishing, ISBN 1-894963-16-4
- Fischler, Stan (1976), Those Were The Days: The Lore of Hockey by the Legends of the Game, New York, NY: Dodd, Mead & Company, ISBN 0-396-07015-9
- Hardy, Stephen; Holman, Andrew C. (2018), Hockey: A Global History, Champaign, Illinois: University of Illinois Press, ISBN 978-0-252-08397-6
- Holzman, Morey; Nieforth, Joseph (2002), Deceptions and Doublecross: How the NHL Conquered Hockey, Toronto: Dundurn Press, ISBN 1-55002-413-2
- Jenish, D'Arcy (2013), The NHL Centennial History: 100 Years of On-Ice Action & Boardroom Battles, Toronto: Doubleday Canada, ISBN 978-0-385-67146-0
- Jenish, D'Arcy (1992), The Stanley Cup: A Hundred Years of Hockey at Its Best, Toronto: McClelland & Stewart, ISBN 0-7710-4406-2
- Kitchen, Paul (2008), Win, Tie, or Wrangle: The Inside Story of the Old Ottawa Senators 1883–1935, Manotick, Ontario: Penumbra Press, ISBN 978-1-897323-46-5
- MacLeod, Alan Livingstone (2021), Capitals, Aristocrats, and Cougars: Victoria's Hockey Professionals, 1911–1926, Victoria: Heritage House, ISBN 978-1-77203-373-1
- McKinley, Michael (2009), Hockey: A People's History, Toronto: McClelland & Stewart, ISBN 978-0-7710-5771-7
- McKinley, Michael (2000), Putting a Roof on Winter: Hockey's Rise from Sport to Spectacle, Vancouver: Greystone Books, ISBN 1-55054-798-4
- Norton, Wayne (2009), Women on Ice: The Early Years of Women's Hockey in Western Canada, Ronsdale Press, ISBN 978-1-55380-073-6
- Ross, J. Andrew (2015), Joining the Clubs: The Business of the National Hockey League to 1945, Syracuse, New York: Syracuse University Press, ISBN 978-0-8156-3383-9
- Stott, Jon C. (2008), Ice Warriors: The Pacific Coast/Western Hockey League 1948–1974, Surrey, British Columbia: Heritage House Publishing, ISBN 978-1-894974-54-7
- Svrluga, Barry (February 10, 2019), "For hockey's royal family, Dick Patrick getting his name on Stanley Cup is final coronation", Washington Post, Washington
- "Rangers won, 2-1: Lester Patrick Figured in Victory Over Americans", The Montreal Gazette, Montreal, March 21, 1927
- Whitehead, Eric (1977), Cyclone Taylor: A Hockey Legend, Toronto: Doubleday Canada, ISBN 0-385-13063-5
- Whitehead, Eric (1980), The Patricks: Hockey's Royal Family, New York City: Doubleday, ISBN 0-385-15662-6
- Wong, John (2018), "The Patricks's Hockey Empire: Cultural Entrepreneurship and the Pacific Coast Hockey Association, 1911–1924", The International Journal of the History of Sport, 35 (7–8): 673–693, doi:10.1080/09523367.2018.1540411, S2CID 151023851
- Wong, John Chi-Kit (2005). Lords of the Rinks. University of Toronto Press. ISBN 0-8020-8520-2.
- Zweig, Eric (2015), Art Ross: The Hockey Legend Who Built the Bruins, Dundurn Press, ISBN 978-1-4597-3040-3
- Zweig, Eric (2012), Stanley Cup: 120 Years of Hockey Supremacy, Richmond Hill, Ontario: Firefly Books, ISBN 978-1-77085-104-7

Preceded by Position created	Head coach of the New York Rangers; 1926–39	Succeeded by Frank Boucher
Preceded by Conn Smythe	General Manager of the New York Rangers; 1926–46	Succeeded by Frank Boucher
Preceded by John S. Hammond	President of the New York Rangers; 1932–34	Succeeded by John S. Hammond
