= Frank Patrick (ice hockey) =

Canadian ice hockey player

- Hockey Hall of Fame, 1950 (Builder)
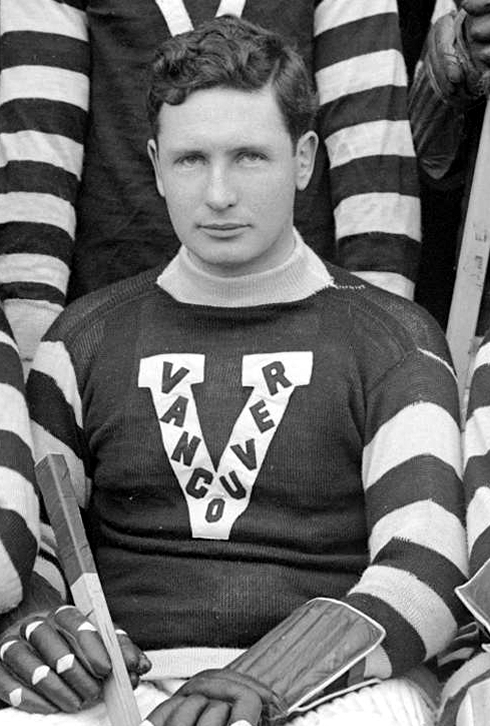
- Patrick while a member of the Vancouver Millionaires, 1913–14
- Born: December 21, 1885 Ottawa, Ontario, Canada
- Died: June 29, 1960 (aged 74) Vancouver, British Columbia, Canada
- Height: 5 ft 11 in (180 cm)
- Weight: 185 lb (84 kg; 13 st 3 lb)
- Position: Defence
- Shot: Left
- Played for: Vancouver Maroons (PCHA); Vancouver Millionaires (PCHA); Nelson Hockey Club (WKHL); Renfrew Creamery Kings (NHA); Montreal Victorias (ECAHA)
- Playing career: 1904–1924

Francis Alexis Patrick (December 21, 1885 – June 29, 1960) was a Canadian professional ice hockey player, head coach, manager, and executive. Along with his brother Lester, he founded the Pacific Coast Hockey Association (PCHA), the first major professional hockey league in Western Canada. Patrick, who also served as president of the league, took control of the Vancouver Millionaires, serving as a player, coach, and manager of the team. It was in the PCHA that Patrick would introduce many innovations to hockey that remain today, including the blue line, the penalty shot, and tracking assists, among others.

Born in Ottawa and raised in Montreal, Patrick first played hockey there along with his brother Lester. In 1904 he made his debut in the top Canadian league, though was limited as he attended McGill University and then moved west to British Columbia with his family in 1907 to establish a lumber company. The Patrick brothers returned to Central Canada in 1909 when they signed with the Renfrew Creamery Kings for one season. The Patrick family sold their lumber company in 1910 and used the proceeds to establish the PCHA, setting up teams in Vancouver, Victoria, and New Westminster. The league soon established itself as a legitimate enterprise, and their champions played for the Stanley Cup starting in 1915. Patrick played for, coached, and managed the Vancouver Millionaires, which won the Cup in 1915, the first team west of Manitoba to do so, and played for the Cup again in 1918, 1921, and 1922, losing each time. Patrick also served as president of the PCHA for nearly its entire existence, and in this role introduced many rules that helped modernize the game, making it both faster and more entertaining.

In 1926 the PCHA, which had since merged with the Western Canada Hockey League and was later renamed the Western Hockey League, was sold to the eastern-based National Hockey League (NHL). Patrick would later join the NHL in 1933, serving first in an executive role for the league and then as coach for the Boston Bruins from 1934 to 1936, and worked with the Montreal Canadiens from 1940 to 1941 in a business management role. Outside of hockey he faced financial difficulties, and died in 1960, four weeks after Lester. In recognition of his role in establishing modern hockey, Patrick was inducted into the Hockey Hall of Fame as a builder in 1950.

== Early life ==
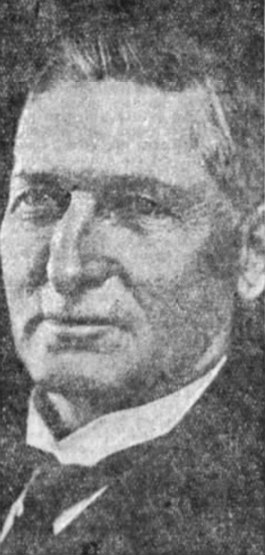
Frank Patrick's father Joe

Patrick's father, Joe, was the son of Irish immigrants: Thomas Patrick had emigrated from County Tyrone in Ireland to Canada in 1848 and settled in Quebec. Joe was born in 1857 and in 1883 married Grace Nelson. They moved to Drummondville, Quebec, where Joe worked as a general store clerk and Grace was a schoolmarm. Drummondville was predominantly French-speaking and Catholic at the time, making the Anglophone and Methodist Patrick family a minority in the town. Patrick was born on December 21, 1885, in Ottawa, Ontario, the second son of Joe and Grace Patrick. (Note: There were six children in total: Lester, Frank, Lucinda, Edward, and Dora, and a girl who died in infancy.) It is not clear why he was born in Ottawa, which was roughly a five-hour train ride from Drummondville at the time; biographer Eric Whitehead suggested Grace likely needed some specialized care for the birth as the reason for the relocation. In 1887 the family moved 9 miles (14 km) to Carmell Hill, where Joe bought a half-interest in a general store with William Mitchell. (Note: Mitchell later became a Canadian senator.) As in Drummondville the town was mainly Francophone, leading the family to learn French. Joe and his partners sold their store in 1892, earning a substantial profit of $10,000; Joe used his $5,000 to establish a lumber company and built a mill in Daveluyville, which was 60 miles (97 km) west of Quebec City. That winter Patrick and his older brother Lester received their first pair of skates. In 1893 the family moved again, this time to Montreal, as Joe expanded his lumber company. They first lived in Pointe-Saint-Charles, a rail district, before moving to the more prosperous suburb of Westmount in 1895. While in Montreal the two older Patrick brothers were first introduced to ice hockey. Patrick attended Stanstead College, a prep school, where he played both hockey and football. They also met Art Ross at this time, who became a close friend of both brothers and had an extensive career in hockey.

In 1904 Patrick played his first senior games, with the Montreal Victorias of the Canadian Amateur Hockey League, then the top league in Canada; he recorded four goals in the five games played for the team. While back from school during a break in 1905, he briefly joined the Montreal Westmount club and played two games. Lester was also on the team, and this marked the first time the brothers played together.

Patrick enrolled at McGill University in Montreal in 1906, and joined their hockey team. The next year Joe purchased a tract of land in the Slocan Valley in southeastern British Columbia (BC), and moved the family west to Nelson, British Columbia, a town near the land, to start a new lumber company there. Patrick remained in Montreal to complete his studies, as he had one year remaining. He played with the Victorias as well during the season, recording eight goals in eight games (he missed the final two games due to a shoulder injury). While professionalism had been allowed in the Eastern Canada Amateur Hockey Association (ECAHA) at that time, Patrick remained an amateur. He also worked as a referee in league matches, and while he was the youngest official he was considered to be one of the best, the league president at one point calling him the "most competent referee [they'd] seen all winter". (Note: Whitehead erroneously states the team was based in Ottawa. See Whitehead 1980, p. 48.)

== Nelson and Renfrew ==
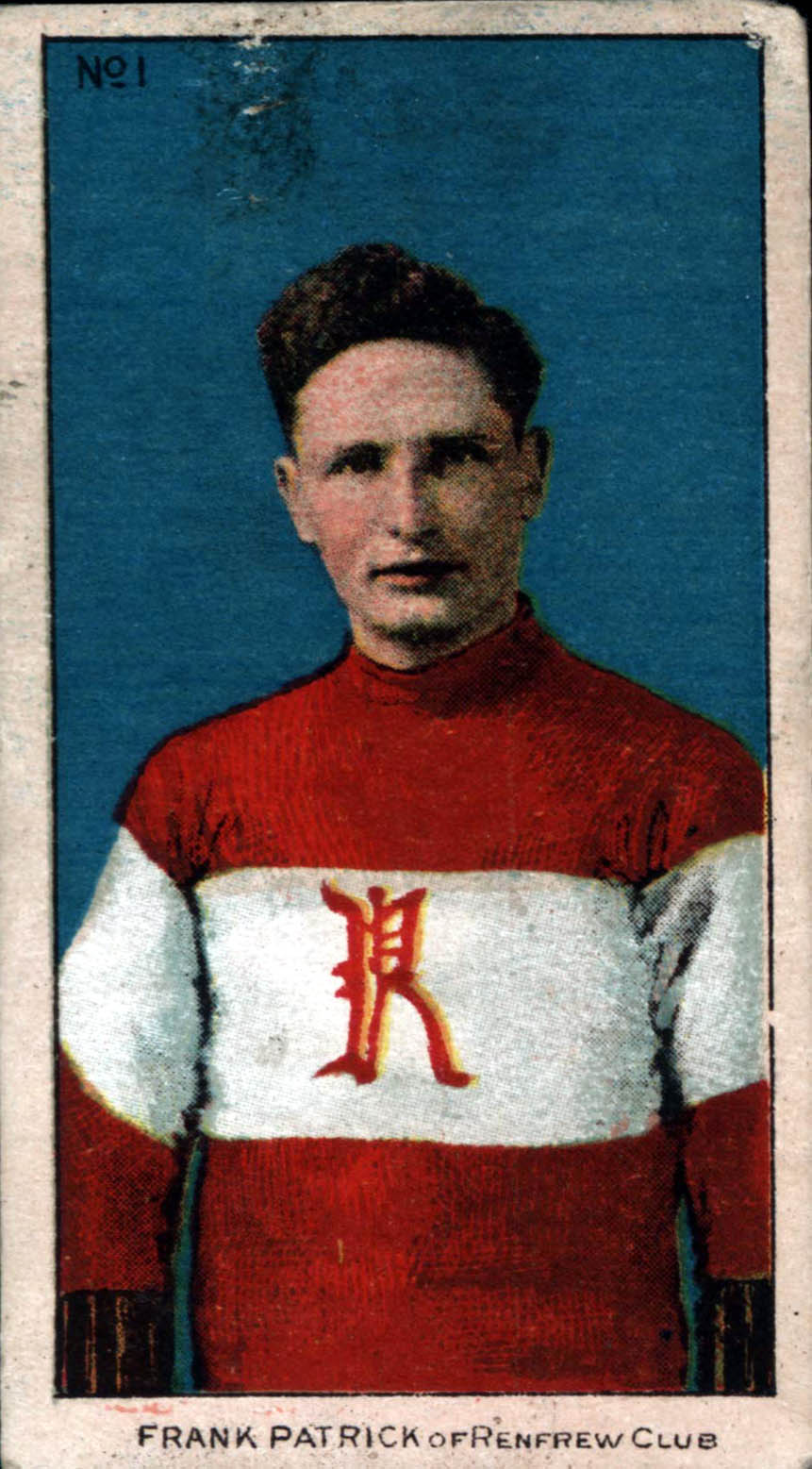
Patrick with the Renfrew Creamery Kings on a hockey card, circa 1910–1912

In April 1908 Patrick graduated from McGill with a Bachelor of Arts degree and was planning to travel west immediately to join his family and work for the new company. However he injured his leg in a baseball game that spring, which forced him to stay in Montreal until September 1908. On arrival he took up a position as a "timer", overseeing the 200 labourers who fell trees. He also joined Lester on the local Nelson Hockey Club, which competed in a regional league. Patrick scored nine goals in the five games he played.

The following year a new top-level league, the National Hockey Association (NHA), was established; unlike the ECHA (Note: The ECAHA renamed itself the ECHA in 1908, dropping the word "Amateur".), the NHA was openly professional. Several teams began to send offers to both Patrick brothers, who had decided to return east for the winter and play hockey there. Among the teams making offers were the Renfrew Creamery Kings, owned by J. Ambrose O'Brien, a wealthy mining magnate, and when Lester received the offer he replied saying he would join the team for $3,000, an exorbitant salary for the era. Surprised by the offer, Lester asked for his brother as well, and Patrick was offered $2,000 to join the team.

Along with other high-profile players, most famously Cyclone Taylor, who signed for a reported $5,250, (Note: The figure $5,250 comes from Whitehead's biography of Taylor. However Cosentino has suggested the base salary was closer to $2,000, with the rest coming from a guaranteed salary outside of hockey and a bond to ensure he would sign. Regardless, Taylor had the highest salary in hockey history. See Whitehead 1977, pp. 105–106 and Cosentino 1990, p. 73.) the team was nicknamed the "Millionaires". Along with several teammates, the Patricks lived in a boarding house in Renfrew during the season, and players were often seen together about town. While Lester was more out-spoken, Patrick was quiet and reserved, though that changed when the topic of hockey came up. He became quite lively and was open about his ideas on how to improve the game, and what type of tactics could be used. Taylor would later recall he was quite impressed by the brothers knowledge and views, stating that "Frank in particular had an amazing grasp of the science of hockey, and they were both already dreaming about changes that would improve the game".

During the 1909–10 season, Patrick scored 8 goals in 11 games, though the team failed to win the championship. After the season the Creamery Kings went to New York City for an exhibition series against other NHA teams. Patrick was impressed by both the diversity of people living in the city (Note: Taylor later recalled Patrick "couldn't get over all the languages he heard spoken during a walk along Sixth Avenue".) and Madison Square Garden. While it did not have an ice-making plant at the time, Patrick was interested enough to make sketches of the arena, and studied it in detail while he was in New York.

The outlandish salaries offered by Renfrew and other teams were unsustainable, and in response the NHA instituted a salary cap of $8,000 per team for the 1910–11 season. Both Patricks had already returned to Nelson, certain their hockey careers were over anyway. They did help build a rink in Nelson, largely financed by their father. Patrick played a few games for Nelson that winter, but was not seriously committed.

== PCHA ==
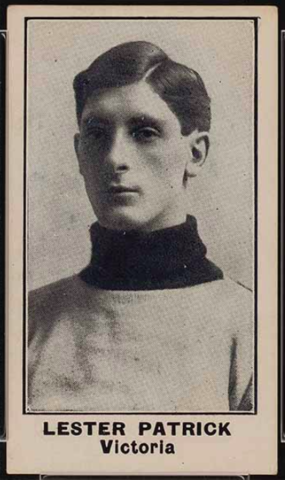
Lester Patrick, 1912. The Patrick brothers formed the PCHA together, and introduced several innovations that shaped modern hockey.

Joe sold his lumber company in January 1911, making a profit of around $440,000, of which he gave both Lester and Frank $25,000. In a separate transaction Joe also sold a private interest he had, earning a further $35,000. With this money Joe solicited ideas from his family on what to invest in, and Patrick suggested they establish their own hockey league, one based in BC and that they controlled. It was put to a vote, with both Joe and Frank voting in favour and Lester against, so they agreed to move forward. They incorporated the new league, the Pacific Coast Hockey Association (PCHA), on December 7, 1911.

The initial plan was to place teams in large cities in Western Canada, with one each in Vancouver and Victoria (both in BC), and one in Edmonton and Calgary (both in Alberta). Issues in finding support for the Alberta-based teams meant that the new league would only be based in BC initially. The mild weather on the West Coast meant that unlike Central and Eastern Canada natural ice could not be used for games, and so the Patrick family built two arenas: the Denman Arena in Vancouver and the Patrick Arena in Victoria. While the arenas were being built Patrick went east to recruit players, offering up to twice the salary they were making in the NHA to join the new league, and was able to recruit several high-profile names. Patrick managed and played for the Vancouver team, (Note: The team would later be known as the "Millionaires".) while Lester would do the same for the Victoria team. (Note: The Victoria team would be known variously as the "Capitals", "Aristocrats", and "Cougars" during its existence.) Patrick played all 15 games for Vancouver during the 1912 season, (Note: The schedule called for 16 games, but in his role as league executive Patrick had cancelled the last game of the season, as the league standings had been determined.) and recorded 23 goals, placing him second on Vancouver for scoring and fourth in the league. The league itself did well and demonstrated it could be a serious challenger to the supremacy of the NHA.

To help bolster attendance and improve his team for the 1912–13 season, Patrick signed his former teammate in Renfrew, Cyclone Taylor, who was considered one of the biggest names in hockey at the time. The signing of Taylor to the PCHA gave the league legitimacy. While the first games of the PCHA's inaugural season only had half the tickets sold, the Millionaires sold out their home opener for the 1912–13 season, Taylor's debut in the league. It was the first sell-out for the PCHA. However even with Taylor on the team, Vancouver (who had now began to be known as the "Millionaires") did not win the league title, finishing second; Patrick again placed fourth overall in league scoring, and third on Vancouver, with 20 points in 16 games. (Note: Starting in 1912–13 the PCHA kept track of assists; points were the total of goals and assists.)

Though the PCHA was effectively a syndicate controlled by the Patrick brothers, initially they had a figurehead president, William Pickering Irving, until 1913 when Patrick assumed the role; he would keep the title for the rest of the league's existence. The PCHA and NHA also came to an agreement that would see an end to player raiding: the PCHA would hold the professional rights to all players west of Port Arthur, Ontario, while the NHA did so for players between Port Arthur and Montreal (players east of that were subject to the Maritime Professional Hockey League). The leagues also agreed to a yearly challenge series between the two teams that won each league for the right to hold the Stanley Cup, effectively ending the challenge era for the Cup. For a third year in a row Vancouver finished second in the league, with Patrick sixth overall in scoring (second on the team), recording 20 points while playing all 16 games in the 1913–14 season.

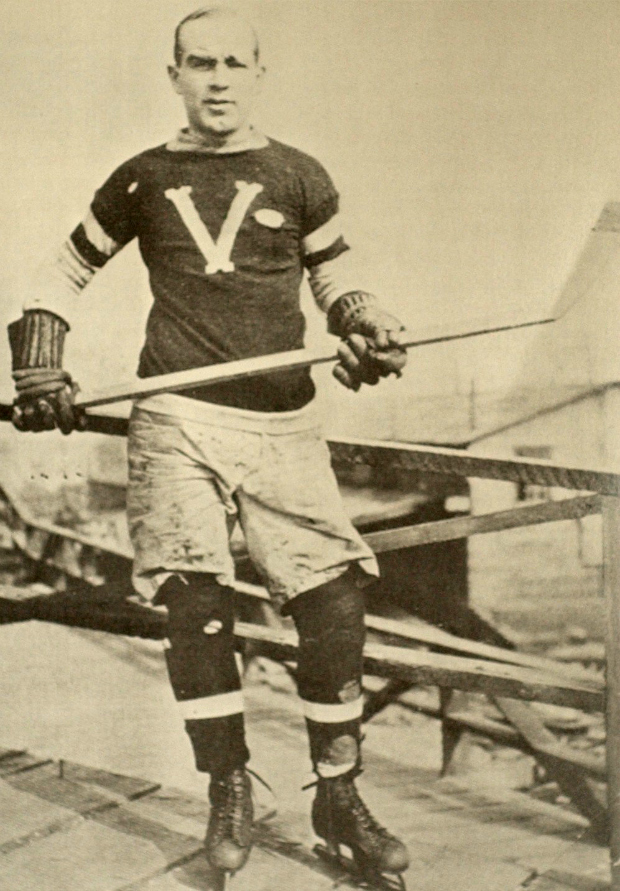
Cyclone Taylor during his first season with the Vancouver Millionaires, 1912–13. Taylor's signing with the PCHA gave the league credibility as a serious enterprise, and helped Vancouver win the Stanley Cup in 1915.

The First World War began before the start of the 1914–15 season, which had a major impact on the league. Patrick initially offered to help form a sportsman's battalion, but the offer was declined by the Canadian government, who preferred to keep the PCHA active in order to boost public morale. Patrick initially retired from playing to focus on coaching and managing the team. However he returned to play near the end of the season to help the defence, ending up in four games during the season with Vancouver. Vancouver won the league championship and competed for the Stanley Cup. The 1915 Final was held in Vancouver, and as the leagues used different rules, games alternated between PCHA and NHA rules. (Note: The most prominent difference in rules was that the PCHA still used the rover, while the NHA had abolished the position; thus PCHA games used seven players (six skaters and a goaltender) on each team, while the NHA used six. See Bowlsby 2012, p. 39.) The NHA champions were the Ottawa Senators. Vancouver won the first three games to win the Cup, the first time a PCHA team had done so. Patrick played all three games of the series and had two goals and one assist.

Prior to the start of the 1915–16 season Patrick led efforts to form a new PCHA team in Seattle, the Seattle Metropolitans, and took an active role in helping build their arena, the Seattle Ice Arena. To help bolster the league, he also saw that the agreement with the NHA end, and both leagues began openly courting signed players. Again sitting out to focus on his off-ice roles, Patrick appeared in eight games during the season and recorded four points. Patrick returned to a full-time playing position for 1916–17 to replace Lloyd Cook, who joined the Spokane Canaries. Patrick played in 23 of the 24 games that season, scoring 26 points.

By 1917 the war was causing a serious impact on the PCHA as many players either enlisted or were drafted into the Canadian military. The Spokane franchise was shut down for the 1917–18 season, both as a means to reduce demand on players, and to save money for the league; the players were dispersed to the other three teams. With the changes Patrick again focused on coaching and managing Vancouver and leading the PCHA as a whole. He did appear in one game during the season, scoring a goal. Vancouver defeated Seattle in the playoffs and won the league championship and a chance to play for the Stanley Cup. The National Hockey League (NHL) was formed in November 1917 to replace the NHA as the top league in Central Canada. The NHL kept the agreement to play the PCHA for the Stanley Cup, and the NHL's champion Toronto Arenas hosted Vancouver for the 1918 Stanley Cup Final. Toronto won the best-of-five series three games to two, with Patrick not playing in any games.

Patrick did not play during the 1918–19 season, one in which Vancouver finished first in the league, though they lost in the playoffs to Seattle. In order to have more time for his league duties and other business affairs, Patrick hired Cook as playing-manager for the 1919–20 season. Patrick would only appear in six more games as a player: twice during the 1922–23 season and for four games during the 1924–25 season. Vancouver played for the Cup again in 1921, when they hosted Ottawa, and 1922 against the Toronto St. Patricks, losing both times.

== NHL ==
By the early 1920s the PCHA was losing money. Seattle folded in 1924, and with only two teams left (Vancouver and Victoria), the Patricks decided to merge with the Western Canada Hockey League, which was renamed the Western Hockey League (WHL). The WHL continued for two seasons until 1926, though with continued financial difficulties and expansion plans by the NHL (which would add three teams between 1924 and 1926, growing to ten teams overall) it was clear the league would not be sustainable. With the consent of five of the six WHL teams (Note: Saskatoon had an agreement to sell its players to the Montreal Maroons.) Patrick met with the NHL and offered to sell the rights to WHL players to the league for a lump sum, allowing the NHL to quickly stock the expansion teams being set up. This was agreed to, and for $100,000 the Victoria team was transferred to Detroit, who named themselves the Detroit Cougars in recognition. (Note: They would later be renamed the Falcons, and finally Red Wings.) The Chicago team, later named the Black Hawks, also paid $100,000 for players, receiving the Portland Rosebuds. The Boston Bruins, whose owner Charles Adams and manager Art Ross had helped facilitate the sale, also purchased select players, paying a total of $17,000, netting the WHL owners a total of $267,000. Patrick was offered positions with both the Chicago Black Hawks and Detroit Cougars, but he refused their offers.

In 1933 he was given a position with the NHL as managing director of the league. In this role he served under NHL president Frank Calder, overseeing on-ice officials and enforcing rules. Prior to the start of the 1933–34 season Patrick announced he would be working to cut down on the violence endemic in the sport and see stronger punishment for infractions. He also implemented some new rules, including a crease around the goal; allowing players to stop flying pucks with their hands; and a major penalty for touching an official in any manner. In this role Patrick oversaw the suspension of Eddie Shore for his hit on Ace Bailey during a December 12, 1933, game that saw Bailey hit his head on the ice and nearly die. Initially suspending Shore for six games, once it was clear Bailey would live (though he was forced to retire from playing), Patrick increased the suspension to 16 games, the longest in NHL history to that time. Shortly after a benefit game was played for Bailey in February 1934, Patrick resigned his role. It is not clear why he did so, but historian J. Andrew Ross has suggested Patrick was expecting to take over from Calder as president of the league in short order, and left when that was not going to happen.

That off-season Art Ross, who had been working as the general manager and coach of the Boston Bruins, offered the coaching position to Patrick for the 1934–35 season, so Ross could focus on managing the team. Patrick accepted, earning $10,500 for the season. However the two did not work well together, and after two seasons with the team Patrick was let go in 1936, with Ross again assuming the coaching duties. There were also allegations that Patrick was drunk during the Bruins' series against the Toronto Maple Leafs in the 1936 playoffs; Patrick's daughter Francis instead thought that he may have had bipolar disorder, though a diagnosis was never made.

== Later life ==
After the WHL disbanded in 1926, Patrick spent the next two years away from hockey. He became involved in prospecting for gold and silver in the Cariboo Mountains region of BC, though was unsuccessful. In 1933 he borrowed money from Joe and invested into mining and oil interests in BC, though gave that up after four years and losing most of the investment, which totaled around $300,000.

In 1928 he helped form a new minor league, the Pacific Coast Hockey League. Patrick owned one team, the Vancouver Lions, and served as the first president of the league. He also continued to manage the Denman Arena, which he kept busy with events. However the Denman Arena burned down the night of August 19, 1936. He was hired by the Montreal Canadiens of the NHL in April 1940 to work as the business manager of the team, however conflicts with the team's manager Tommy Gorman led to Patrick leaving after a few months in 1941 when he took a up a position with the Canadian Car and Foundry, which was owned by the same group that owned the Canadiens.

After his hockey career Patrick had financial issues, which led to him developing an alcohol addiction. Lester tried to help financially, and the NHL provided a $300 per month pension. He also kept working on innovations for hockey, including an unbreakable hockey stick developed with lamination process, however by the time it was finished fibre glass sticks had been created, making Patrick's model obsolete.

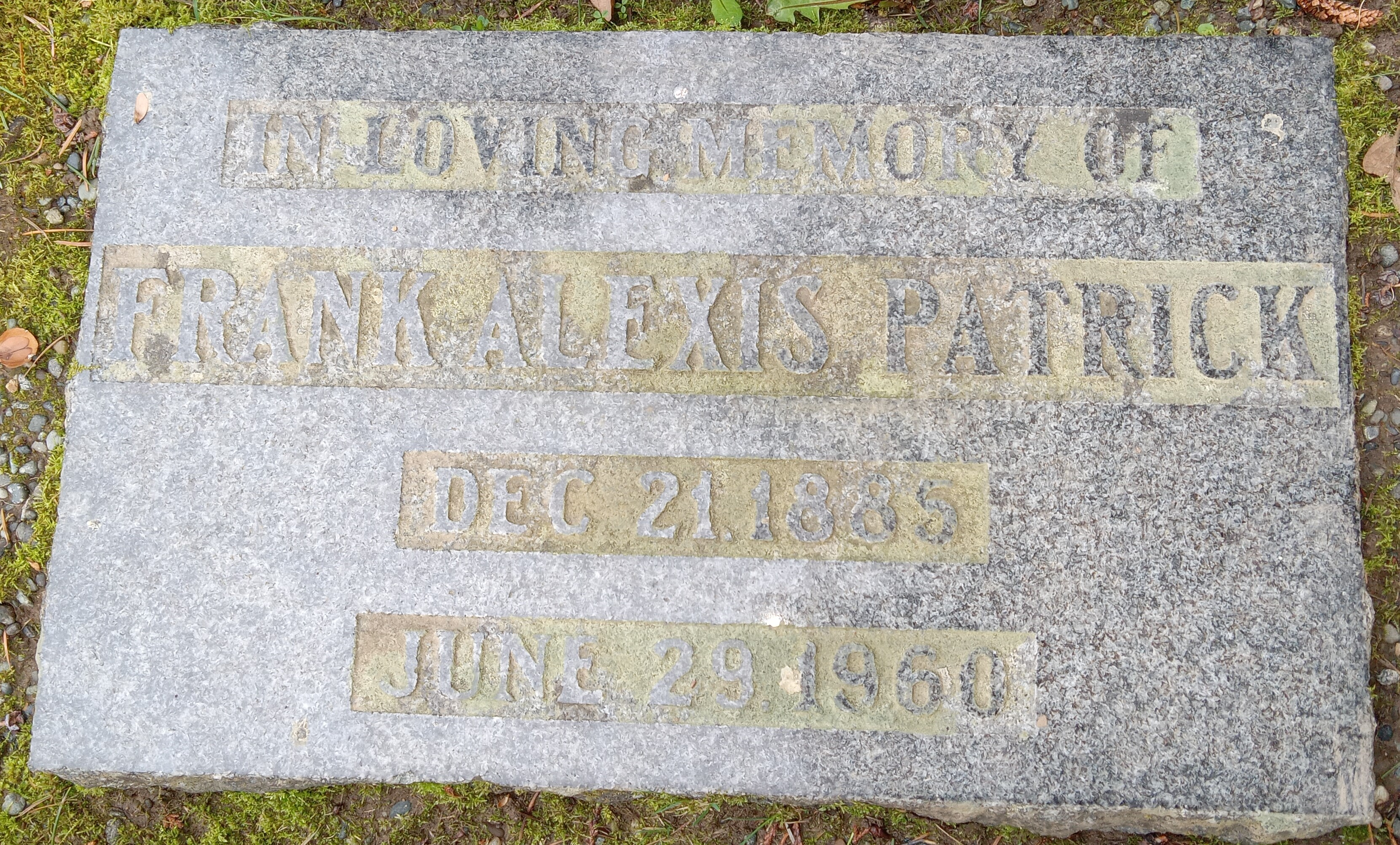
Patrick's grave marker

Lester died on June 1, 1960, in Victoria. Patrick was not well and was unable to attend the funeral of his brother, and on June 29, 1960, he too died, in Vancouver from a heart attack. Patrick and his wife Catherine had three children: one son and two daughters. He was interred in the family plot at the Royal Oak Burying Park.

== Legacy ==
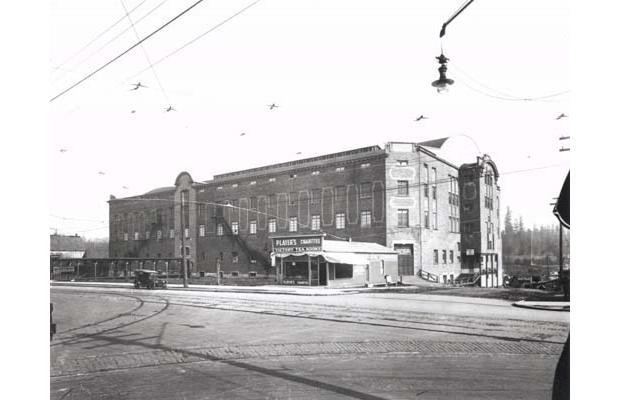
The Denman Arena in Vancouver in 1913. Built and owned by the Patrick family, it was the first arena in Canada to have artificial ice, and with a capacity of 10,500 was the largest arena in the country when it opened in 1911. It burned down in 1936.

Patrick, along with his brother Lester, is credited with helping shape modern hockey. His Hockey Hall of Fame biography notes that he is "credited with 22 changes that remain in the NHL rulebook". Among the innovations they introduced was officially tracking assists and allowing goaltenders to stop a puck any way they wanted (previously they had to remain on their feet). In 1913 they decided to add lines on the ice, thereby dividing the surface into zones and allowing forward passing in certain zones, which allowed for a faster-paced game. Patrick devised the penalty shot in 1921 as a means to counteract fouls on good scoring chances. The Patricks are also credited with introducing numbers to player sweaters for identification purposes (starting in 1911–12), but this had been had also been experimented with in the NHA at the same time. In recognition of his contributions to the sport, Patrick was inducted into the Hockey Hall of Fame as a builder in 1950.

Patrick also played a role in the early development of women's hockey. After establishing the PCHA, he helped found the Vancouver Amazons, a women's team. As early as January 1916, the Patrick brothers talked of forming a women's league to complement the PCHA and occupy dates for their arenas in Vancouver and Victoria. The proposal included teams from Vancouver, Victoria, Portland, and Seattle. The league never formed but in January 1917, the Vancouver News-Advertiser reported that wives of the Seattle Metropolitans had assembled a team. In February 1921, Patrick announced a women's international championship series that would be played in conjunction with the PCHA. A series of games were held over that month with teams from Seattle, Vancouver, and Victoria, playing during intermissions of PCHA games. Both Seattle and Victoria's teams disbanded after the series, and Patrick did not further develop a women's league.

== Career statistics ==
=== Regular season and playoffs ===
| | | | Regular season | | | | | Playoffs |
| Season | Team | League | GP | G | A | Pts | PIM | GP | G | A | Pts | PIM |
|---|---|---|---|---|---|---|---|---|---|---|---|---|
| 1903–04 | Montreal Victorias | CAHL | 5 | 4 | 1 | 5 | 0 | — | — | — | — | — |
| 1904–05 | Montreal Westmount | CAHL | 2 | 4 | 0 | 4 | 0 | — | — | — | — | — |
| 1905–06 | McGill University | CIAU | 3 | 6 | 0 | 6 | 0 | — | — | — | — | — |
| 1906–07 | McGill University | CIAU | 4 | 6 | 0 | 6 | 12 | — | — | — | — | — |
| 1907–08 | Montreal Victorias | ECAHA | 8 | 8 | 0 | 8 | 6 | — | — | — | — | — |
| 1908–09 | Nelson HC | WKHL | 5 | 9 | 0 | 9 | 0 | — | — | — | — | — |
| 1909–10 | Renfrew Creamery Kings | NHA | 11 | 8 | 0 | 8 | 23 | — | — | — | — | — |
| 1910–11 | Nelson HC | BCBHL | 3 | 0 | 0 | 0 | 0 | — | — | — | — | — |
| 1911–12 | Vancouver Millionaires | PCHA | 15 | 23 | 0 | 23 | 0 | — | — | — | — | — |
| 1912–13 | Vancouver Millionaires | PCHA | 14 | 12 | 8 | 20 | 17 | — | — | — | — | — |
| 1913–14 | Vancouver Millionaires | PCHA | 16 | 11 | 9 | 20 | 3 | — | — | — | — | — |
| 1914–15 | Vancouver Millionaires | PCHA | 4 | 2 | 2 | 4 | 6 | — | — | — | — | — |
| 1914–15 | Vancouver Millionaires | St-Cup | — | — | — | — | — | 3 | 2 | 1 | 3 | 0 |
| 1915–16 | Vancouver Millionaires | PCHA | 8 | 3 | 1 | 4 | 3 | — | — | — | — | — |
| 1916–17 | Vancouver Millionaires | PCHA | 23 | 13 | 13 | 26 | 30 | — | — | — | — | — |
| 1917–18 | Vancouver Millionaires | PCHA | 1 | 1 | 0 | 1 | 0 | — | — | — | — | — |
| 1922–23 | Vancouver Millionaires | PCHA | 2 | 0 | 1 | 1 | 0 | — | — | — | — | — |
| 1924–25 | Vancouver Maroons | WCHL | 4 | 0 | 1 | 1 | 0 | — | — | — | — | — |
| NHA totals | | | 12 | 9 | 0 | 9 | 23 | — | — | — | — | — |
| PCHA/WCHL totals | | | 87 | 65 | 36 | 101 | 59 | — | — | — | — | — |

- Stats from Total Hockey

=== Coaching ===
| | | | Regular season | | | | | Playoffs |
| Season | Team | League | GC | W | L | T | Finish | GC | W | L | Result |
|---|---|---|---|---|---|---|---|---|---|---|---|
| 1934–35 | Boston Bruins | NHL | 48 | 26 | 16 | 6 | 1st, American | 4 | 1 | 3 | Lost in semi-final |
| 1935–36 | Boston Bruins | NHL | 48 | 22 | 20 | 6 | 2nd, American | 2 | 1 | 1 | Lost in semi-final |
| NHL totals | | | 96 | 48 | 36 | 12 | — | 6 | 1 | 4 | — |

- Coaching stats from Total Hockey

== See also ==
- List of family relations in the NHL
- List of members of Canada's Sports Hall of Fame
- List of members of the Hockey Hall of Fame
- List of professional sports families

== Bibliography ==
- Boileau, Ron; Wolf, Philip (2002), "The Pacific Coast Hockey Association: Innovative Pioneer League Took Top Hockey West", in Diamond, Dan (ed.), Total Hockey: The Official Encyclopedia of the National Hockey League (Second ed.), New York: Total Sports Publishing, pp. 51–54, ISBN 1-892129-85-X
- Bowlsby, Craig H. (2012), Empire of Ice: The Rise and Fall of the Pacific Coast Hockey Association, 1911–1926, Vancouver: Knights of Winter, ISBN 978-0-9691705-6-3
- Coleman, Charles L. (1964), The Trail of the Stanley Cup, Volume 1: 1893–1926 inc., Dubuque, Iowa: Kendall/Hunt Publishing, OCLC 957132
- Cosentino, Frank (1990), The Renfrew Millionaires: The Valley Boys of Winter 1910, Burnstown, Ontario: General Store Publishing House, ISBN 0-919431-35-6
- Diamond, Dan, ed. (2003), Total Hockey: The Official Encyclopedia of the National Hockey League, Second Edition, New York: Total Sports Publishing, ISBN 1-894963-16-4
- Frank Patrick Biography, Hockey Hall of Fame
- Duff, Bob (2017), The First Season: 1917–18 and the Birth of the NHL, Windsor, Ontario: Biblioasis, ISBN 978-1-771961-84-4
- Holzman, Morey; Nieforth, Joseph (2002), Deceptions and Doublecross: How the NHL Conquered Hockey, Toronto: Dundurn Press, ISBN 1-55002-413-2
- Hockey Hall of Fame (2003), Honoured Members: Hockey Hall of Fame, Bolton, Ontario: Fenn Publishing, ISBN 1-55168-239-7
- Jenish, D'Arcy (2013), The NHL Centennial History: 100 Years of On-Ice Action & Boardroom Battles, Toronto: Doubleday Canada, ISBN 978-0-385-67146-0
- Jenish, D'Arcy (1992), The Stanley Cup: A Hundred Years of Hockey at its Best, Toronto, Ontario: McClelland & Stewart Inc., ISBN 0-7710-4406-2
- Kitchen, Paul (2008), Win, Tie, or Wrangle: The Inside Story of the Old Ottawa Senators 1883–1935, Manotick, Ontario: Penumbra Press, ISBN 978-1-897323-46-5
- MacLeod, Alan Livingstone (2021), Capitals, Aristocrats, and Cougars: Victoria's Hockey Professionals, 1911–1926, Victoria: Heritage House, ISBN 978-1-77203-373-1
- McKinley, Michael (2009), Hockey: A People's History, Toronto: McClelland & Stewart, ISBN 978-0-7710-5771-7
- McKinley, Michael (2000), Putting a Roof on Winter: Hockey's Rise from Sport to Spectacle, Vancouver: Greystone Books, ISBN 1-55054-798-4
- Norton, Wayne (2009), Women on Ice: The Early Years of Women's Hockey in Western Canada, Ronsdale Press, ISBN 978-1-55380-073-6
- Ross, J. Andrew (2015), Joining the Clubs: The Business of the National Hockey League to 1945, Syracuse, New York: Syracuse University Press, ISBN 978-0-8156-3383-9
- Whitehead, Eric (1977), Cyclone Taylor: A Hockey Legend, Toronto: Doubleday Canada, ISBN 0-385-13063-5
- Whitehead, Eric (1980), The Patricks: Hockey's Royal Family, New York City: Doubleday, ISBN 0-385-15662-6
- Wong, John (2018), "The Patricks's Hockey Empire: Cultural Entrepreneurship and the Pacific Coast Hockey Association, 1911–1924", The International Journal of the History of Sport, 35 (7–8): 673–693, doi:10.1080/09523367.2018.1540411, S2CID 151023851
- Wong, John Chi-Kit (2012), "Boomtown Hockey: The Vancouver Millionaires", in Wong, John Chi-Kit (ed.), Coast to Coast: Hockey in Canada to the Second World War, Toronto, Ontario: University of Toronto Press, pp. 223–257, ISBN 978-0-8020-9532-9
- Wong, John Chi-Kit (2005), Lords of the Rinks: The Emergence of the National Hockey League 1875–1936, Toronto: University of Toronto Press, ISBN 0-8020-8520-2
- Zweig, Eric (2015), Art Ross: The Hockey Legend Who Built the Bruins, Dundurn Press, ISBN 978-1-4597-3040-3

Sporting positions
| Preceded by Art Ross | Head coach of the Boston Bruins; 1934–36 | Succeeded by Art Ross |
