= 1912–13 PCHA season =

Canadian pro ice hockey league season

1912 PCHA season
- League: Pacific Coast Hockey Association
- Sport: Ice hockey
- Duration: December 10, 1912–March 18, 1913
- Number of teams: 3

1912–13
- Champion: Victoria Senators
- Top scorer: Tommy Dunderdale (Victoria)

PCHA seasons
- ← 1912 1913–14 →

The 1912–13 PCHA season was the second season of the professional men's ice hockey Pacific Coast Hockey Association. Season play ran from December 10, 1912, to March 18, 1913. Like the previous season, teams were to play a 16-game schedule, but one game was cancelled. The Victoria Senators were the PCHA champions. After the season the club played, and won, an exhibition series against the National Hockey Association champion Quebec Bulldogs.

== Offseason ==
The Patricks signed Cyclone Taylor from the Ottawa Senators, replacing Newsy Lalonde who returned to the Montreal Canadiens. Taylor signed with the Vancouver Millionaires on November 19, 1912.

== Teams ==
1912–13 Pacific Coast Hockey Association
Team	City	Arena	Capacity
New Westminster Royals	Vancouver, British Columbia	Denman Arena	10,500
Vancouver Millionaires	Vancouver, British Columbia	Denman Arena	10,500
Victoria Senators	Victoria, British Columbia	Patrick Arena	4,000

=== Map of teams ===
PCHA Teams

== Regular season ==
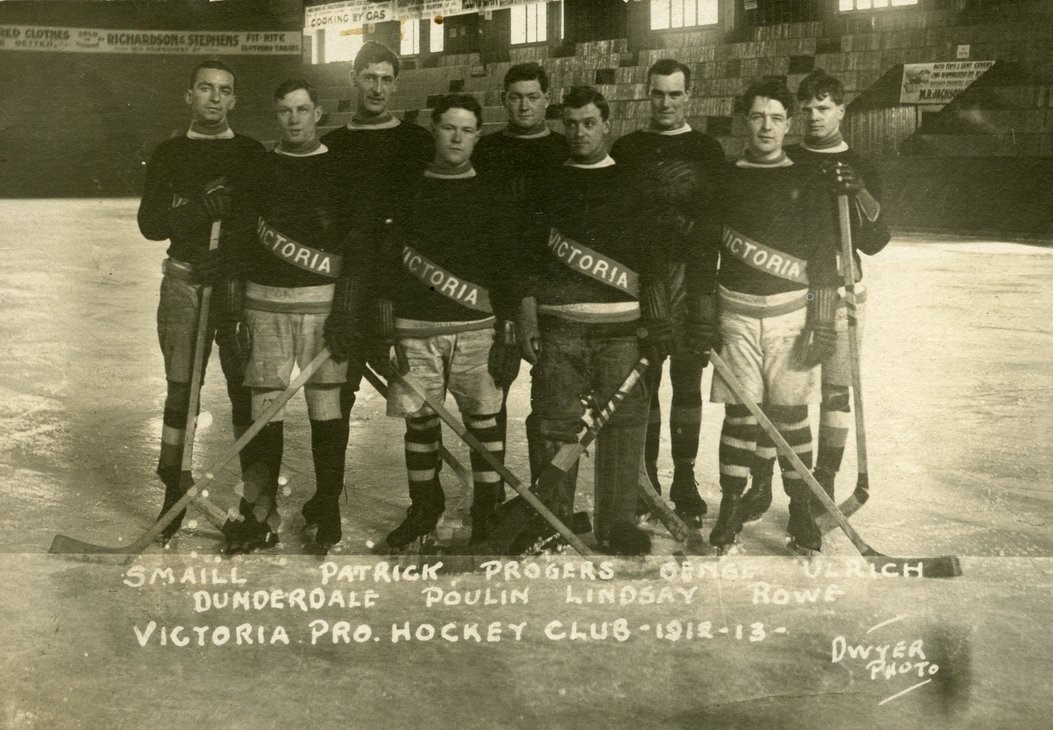
1912–13 Victoria Senators

The PCHA moved two games east of the Rockies, on March 17 in Calgary, Alberta, and on March 18 in Regina, Saskatchewan. The final game of the season, between Victoria and New Westminster was cancelled. Victoria won the championship and formally asked to play for the Stanley Cup, but was turned down due to the PCHA season ending several weeks later than the eastern leagues' season finished.

=== Highlights ===
On January 14, 1913, the PCHA held a speed skating competition among PCHA players. Ken Mallen was the victor, defeating Cyclone Taylor and Si Griffis. Griffis defeated Ernie Johnson to challenge Mallen.

Tommy Dunderdale won the overall scoring championship with 24 goals in 15 games. The top one-game performance was on March 17, when Eddie Oatman scored five goals in a game against Vancouver. On January 31, Lester Patrick, a defenseman, scored four goals in one game versus New Westminster.

The PCHA tried out NHA-style six-man hockey on February 15, in a game between New Westminster and Vancouver, but reverted to seven-man play for the rest of the season.

=== Final standings ===
Note: W = Wins, L = Losses, T = Ties, GF= Goals For, GA = Goals against

Pacific Coast Hockey Association	GP	W	L	T	GF	GA
Victoria Senators	15	10	5	0	68	56
Vancouver Millionaires	16	7	9	0	84	89
New Westminster Royals	15	6	9	0	67	74

=== Results ===
Month	Day	Visitor	Score	Home	Score
Dec.	10	New Westminster	2	Vancouver	7
Dec.	13	New Westminster	4	Victoria	6
Dec.	17	Victoria	3	Vancouver	6
Dec.	27	Vancouver	4	Victoria	5 (OT 14'15")
Jan.	4	New Westminster	5	Vancouver	10
Jan.	9	New Westminster	2	Victoria	3 (OT 12'45")
Jan.	17	Vancouver	3	Victoria	4
Jan.	21	Victoria	5	Vancouver	4
Jan.	25^{a}	Victoria	1	New Westminster	3
Jan.	28	New Westminster	2	Vancouver	8
Jan.	31	New Westminster	3	Victoria	7
Feb.	4	Victoria	7	Vancouver	4
Feb.	7	Vancouver	3	New Westminster	2 (OT 5'45")
Feb.	11	Vancouver	2	Victoria	7
Feb.	15	New Westminster	5	Vancouver	3
Feb.	18	Victoria	1	New Westminster	6
Feb.	21	New Westminster	1	Victoria	8
Feb.	25	Victoria	6	Vancouver	9
Feb.	28	Vancouver	3	New Westminster	11
Mar.	4	Vancouver	5	Victoria	4
Mar.	7	Victoria	1	New Westminster	0
Mar.	17^{b}	Vancouver	7	New Westminster	11
Mar.	18^{c}	Vancouver	6	New Westminster	10
Mar.	^{d}	Victoria	-	New Westminster	-

- ^{a} Played in Vancouver
- ^{b} Played in Calgary
- ^{c} Played in Regina
- ^{d} Cancelled

A game between Victoria and New Westminster was cancelled at the end of the season.

== Player statistics ==
=== Scoring leaders ===
Player	Team	GP	G	A	Pts	PIM
Tommy Dunderdale	Victoria Senators	15	24	5	29	36
Carl Kendall	Vancouver Millionaires	14	14	6	20	21
Smokey Harris	Vancouver Millionaires	16	14	6	20	61
Frank Patrick	Vancouver Millionaires	14	12	8	20	17
Lester Patrick	Victoria Senators	15	14	5	19	12
Cyclone Taylor	Vancouver Millionaires	14	10	8	18	5
Jack McDonald	Vancouver Millionaires	16	11	4	15	9
Ran McDonald	New Westminster Royals	12	11	3	14	29
Charles Tobin	New Westminster Royals	13	11	3	14	20
Eddie Oatman	New Westminster Royals	13	9	5	14	46

=== Goaltending averages ===
Name	Club	GP	GA	SO	Avg.
Bert Lindsay	Victoria	15	56	1	3.7
Hughie Lehman	New Westminster	14	64		4.6
Allan Parr	Vancouver	16	89		5.6
Foxy Smith	New Westminster	1	10		10.0

== See also ==
- List of pre-NHL seasons
- 1912 in sports
- 1913 in sports
