= Joseph Patrick =

Canadian businessman

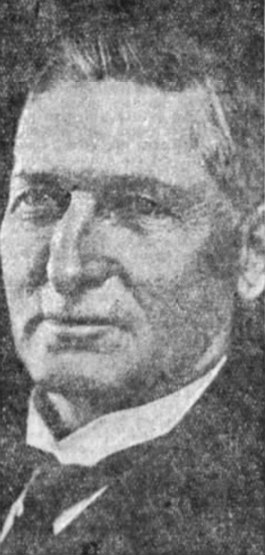
Joseph Patrick

Joseph Patrick (August 4, 1857 – January 28, 1941) was a Canadian businessman who helped start the Pacific Coast Hockey Association with his sons Lester and Frank. Patrick came up with the idea to put numbers on ice hockey players' uniforms.

== Biography ==
Patrick was born in South Durham, Canada East, in 1857. He was one of 10 children born to Irish immigrants Thomas and Lucinda Patrick. In 1881, Patrick moved to Drummondville and became a clerk at a general store. In 1883, he married Grace Nelson. They had eight children, and the two oldest, Lester and Frank, were eventually elected into the Hockey Hall of Fame.

In 1887, Patrick bought a general store with his cousin. They sold the store five years later, and Patrick used the money to form a lumber company. In 1907, he started Patrick Lumber Company in Nelson, British Columbia. In 1911, he sold the company for $440,000. Lester and Frank wanted to start a new ice hockey league, and the money was used to build artificial ice rinks for the league in Vancouver and Victoria. They were the first artificial ice rinks in Canada. Patrick and his family moved to Victoria in 1912, when the new league, the Pacific Coast Hockey Association, began play. His sons made several innovations in ice hockey during this time, and Patrick came up with the idea to put numbers on the players' uniforms. The PCHA continued to operate until 1924.

In his later years, Patrick kept active in the community in Victoria and was an alderman. He died in Vancouver in 1941. In 1998, he was inducted into the BC Sports Hall of Fame. He was the fifth member of his family to be inducted, after Lester, Frank, and his grandsons, Lynn and Muzz.

== Bibliography ==
- Hiam, C. Michael (2011). Eddie Shore and That Old-Time Hockey.
- Whitehead, Eric (1980). The Patricks: Hockey's Royal Family.
