= 1915 Allan Cup =

Canadian senior ice hockey championship

The Allan Cup trophy

The 1915 Allan Cup was the Canadian Amateur Hockey Association (CAHA) championship for senior ice hockey in the 1914–15 season. The title was first held by the Melville Millionaires as champions of their league and two challenge wins. The Millionaires then lost the final Allan Cup challenge to the Winnipeg Monarchs. The 1915 playoff marked the eighth time the Allan Cup had a champion.

== Planning ==
The Canadian Amateur Hockey Association (CAHA) was established in 1914, and arranged playoffs for the 1915 Allan Cup such that one team each from Eastern and Western Canada would challenge for the trophy, and that the cup holders played no more than two series to defend it. The CAHA preferred a home-and-home series, but cup trustee Claude C. Robinson stated that sudden death could be used in case the weather did not support hockey. CAHA president W. F. Taylor determined the playoffs format by having names drawn out of a hat by Winnipeg mayor Richard Deans Waugh.

== Southern Saskatchewan Hockey League ==
The defending 1914 Allan Cup champions, the Regina Victorias, failed to win the Southern Saskatchewan Hockey League. The league champion Melville Millionaires defended the Allan Cup on behalf of the league.

== First challenge ==
The Melville Millionaires received a challenge from the Prince Albert Mintos, Northern Saskatchewan Hockey League champions. The series was a home-and-home.

- Melville Millionaires (Allan Cup holder)
- Prince Albert Mintos (Challenger)

=== Results ===
Melville Millionaires 9 - Prince Albert Mintos 8
Melville Millionaires 6 - Prince Albert Mintos 5

Melville Millionaires win the series 15-13 and retain the Allan Cup.

== Second challenge ==
Melville was challenged for the Allan Cup by the Toronto Victorias of the Ontario Hockey Association (OHA), who wanted to play under the eligibility rules adopted by the CAHA in December 1914. Residency requirements for players on Melville were questioned, whether they had lived in Melville long enough. The Saskatchewan Amateur Hockey Association (SAHA) contested that the residency rules did not come into effect until the next season. The CAHA held a special meeting at Winnipeg to discuss player eligibility and the residence rule.

=== Results ===
Played in Melville, Saskatchewan.

Melville Millionaires 8 - Toronto Victorias 8
Melville Millionaires 7 - Toronto Victorias 3

Melville Millionaires win the series 15-11 and retain the Allan Cup.

== Third challenge ==
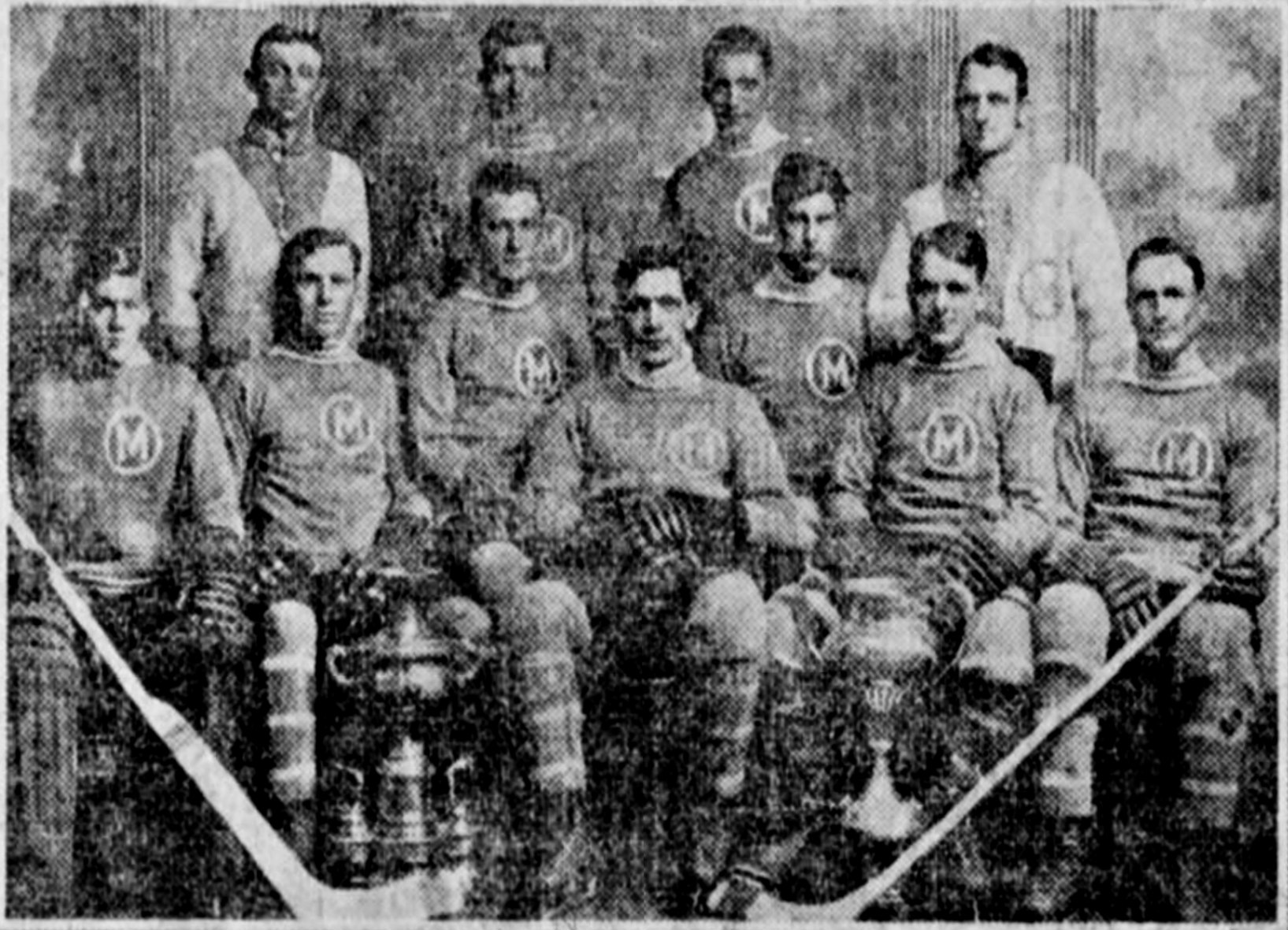
Winnipeg Monarchs with the Allan Cup in 1915. Back row, from left: Walter Robertson (trainer), Dick Irvin, Stan Marples, Harry Stuart. Front row, from left: Tommy Murray, Reg Hay, Frank Cadham, Alex Irvin, Del Irvine, Steamer Maxwell, Clem Loughlin.

The Melville Millionaires received a challenge from the Winnipeg Monarchs who won the Western Canada senior playoffs. The Monarchs were led by Fred Marples as team president and repeated as champions of the Winnipeg Amateur Hockey League. In the 1915 playoffs, the Monarchs defeated the Winnipeg Falcons by a total score of 27–14, defeated Fort William by a total score of 16–10, the defeated Edmonton by a total score of 17–8 to reach the final series.

=== Results ===
Played in Melville, Saskatchewan.

Melville Millionaires 4 - Winnipeg Monarchs 3
Winnipeg Monarchs 4 - Melville Millionaires 2

Winnipeg Monarchs conquer the Allan Cup, winning the series 7-goals-to-6. There were no further challenges.

== Long-term outcomes ==
At the 1915 CAHA general meeting, residency rules were amended to give exceptions to soldiers relocated for service, and for students studying away from home. The CAHA expressed regret that a general meeting was called to handle the SAHA grievance, instead of dealing with the matter at an executive meeting as per the SAHA constitution. The CAHA then made a committee to review the constitutions of each CAHA branch, such that each coincides with the CAHA.

In 1932, the CAHA decided to remove Melville's name from the trophy, since the team lost the final challenge, and to replace the nameplate with a plaque names of players who died serving in World War I. In 1933, the CAHA restored the Melville plate to the trophy, and noted many of the team members had died in World War I.
