= George Hay (ice hockey) =

Canadian ice hockey player (1898–1975)

- Hockey Hall of Fame, 1958
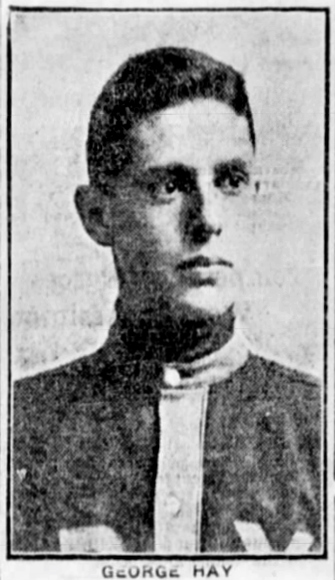
- Born: January 10, 1898 Listowel, Ontario, Canada
- Died: July 13, 1975 (aged 77) Stratford, Ontario, Canada
- Height: 5 ft 6 in (168 cm)
- Weight: 155 lb (70 kg; 11 st 1 lb)
- Position: Left wing
- Shot: Left
- Played for: Regina Capitals; Portland Rosebuds; Chicago Black Hawks; Detroit Red Wings
- Playing career: 1921–1933

William George "The Western Wizard" Hay (January 10, 1898 — July 13, 1975) was a Canadian professional ice hockey forward who played for the Regina Capitals and Portland Rosebuds of the Western Canada Hockey League (WCHL) and the Chicago Black Hawks and Detroit Red Wings in the National Hockey League (NHL) between 1921 and 1933. He was a top star on the Canadian prairies, named a WCHL All-Star four times in five seasons. He transferred to the NHL in 1926 when the Rosebuds were sold to the rival league and went on to score the first goal in the history of the Chicago Black Hawks. He retired in 1933 after several seasons with the Red Wings. Hay was inducted into the Hockey Hall of Fame in 1958.

== Early life ==
Hay was born in Listowel, Ontario, but moved to Winnipeg, Manitoba, at an early age. He and childhood friend Dick Irvin were teammates on the Winnipeg Monarchs when they played junior. On January 10, 1916, Hay enlisted with the 101st Battalion (Winnipeg Light Infantry) to serve in the First World War. He followed in the footsteps of his older brother Reginald "Reg" Hay (born 1890), who was also a hockey player and a member of the 1915 Winnipeg Monarchs senior team which had captured the Allan Cup as senior amateur champions of Canada. Before the Hay brothers both joined the military ranks they had played together on the Monarchs in the Division A of the Manitoba Hockey League during the 1915–16 season. Hay arrived in England in July 1916, and on September 2 that year was in France. At that time the 101st Battalion was broken up, and he transferred to the 17th Reserve Battalion and then the Canadian Army Service Corps. While overseas Hay contracted the Spanish flu, but returned to Canada by May 1919.

== Playing career ==
Returning from the war, Hay settled in Regina, Saskatchewan and played two seasons with the Regina Victorias of the Saskatchewan Senior Hockey League between 1919 and 1921. He then joined the Regina Capitals and began his professional career in the WCHL. In four years in Regina, he was named a league First-Team All-Star three times. Hay remained with the team after it relocated to become the Portland Rosebuds in 1925, and was named an All-Star for the fourth time in 1925–26. When the league collapsed in 1926, the Rosebuds were sold in their entirety to the NHL and became the Chicago Black Hawks.

Hay joined the team in Chicago for the 1926–27 season, and on November 17, 1926, scored the first goal in the history of the Black Hawks. He completed the season in Chicago but was traded, along with Percy Traub, to the Detroit Cougars in exchange for $15,000 after its conclusion. Hay played his finest NHL season in 1927–28, leading the team in goals and points, and was named to an unofficial all-star team by the league's managers. He played seven seasons in the Detroit organization, and retired one game into the 1933–34 season to take over as the coach of their minor league team, the Detroit Olympics, whom he spent three years with before leaving the game.

He was inducted into the Hockey Hall of Fame in 1958, and has been honoured by the Manitoba Hockey Hall of Fame. He was considered one of the best stickhandlers in the game during his time in the NHL.

== Off the ice ==
Following his hockey career, Hay worked in insurance until the outbreak of World War II. He served as a flight-lieutenant and instructor with the Royal Canadian Air Force until the conclusion of the war, after which he returned to his insurance business. He retired in 1965 and lived quietly until his death in Stratford, Ontario, ten years later.

== Career statistics ==
=== Regular season and playoffs ===
| | | | Regular season | | | | | Playoffs |
| Season | Team | League | GP | G | A | Pts | PIM | GP | G | A | Pts | PIM |
|---|---|---|---|---|---|---|---|---|---|---|---|---|
| 1914–15 | Winnipeg Strathconas | MIHL | 7 | 4 | 0 | 4 | — | — | — | — | — | — |
| 1915–16 | Winnipeg Monarchs | MHL Div. A | 7 | 6 | 4 | 10 | 10 | 2 | 2 | 2 | 4 | 4 |
| 1916–17 | Winnipeg Monarchs | WpgJrHL | — | — | — | — | — | — | — | — | — | — |
| 1919–20 | Regina Victorias | SSHL | 12 | 8 | 3 | 11 | 5 | 2 | 1 | 0 | 1 | 0 |
| 1920–21 | Regina Victorias | SSHL | 16 | 9 | 4 | 13 | 7 | 4 | 5 | 2 | 7 | 2 |
| 1921–22 | Regina Capitals | WCHL | 25 | 21 | 11 | 32 | 9 | 6 | 0 | 1 | 1 | 4 |
| 1922–23 | Regina Capitals | WCHL | 30 | 28 | 8 | 36 | 12 | 2 | 1 | 0 | 1 | 0 |
| 1923–24 | Regina Capitals | WCHL | 25 | 20 | 11 | 31 | 8 | 2 | 1 | 1 | 2 | 0 |
| 1924–25 | Regina Capitals | WCHL | 20 | 16 | 6 | 22 | 6 | — | — | — | — | — |
| 1925–26 | Portland Rosebuds | WHL | 30 | 19 | 12 | 31 | 4 | — | — | — | — | — |
| 1926–27 | Chicago Black Hawks | NHL | 35 | 14 | 10 | 23 | 12 | 2 | 1 | 0 | 1 | 2 |
| 1927–28 | Detroit Cougars | NHL | 42 | 22 | 13 | 35 | 22 | — | — | — | — | — |
| 1928–29 | Detroit Cougars | NHL | 41 | 11 | 8 | 19 | 14 | 2 | 1 | 0 | 1 | 0 |
| 1929–30 | Detroit Cougars | NHL | 44 | 18 | 15 | 33 | 8 | — | — | — | — | — |
| 1930–31 | Detroit Falcons | NHL | 44 | 8 | 10 | 18 | 22 | — | — | — | — | — |
| 1931–32 | Detroit Olympics | IHL | 48 | 10 | 9 | 19 | 26 | 6 | 0 | 0 | 0 | 2 |
| 1932–33 | Detroit Red Wings | NHL | 34 | 1 | 6 | 7 | 9 | 4 | 0 | 1 | 1 | 0 |
| 1933–34 | Detroit Olympics | IHL | 4 | 0 | 0 | 0 | 0 | — | — | — | — | — |
| WCHL totals | | | 130 | 104 | 48 | 152 | 39 | 10 | 2 | 2 | 4 | 4 |
| NHL totals | | | 240 | 74 | 62 | 136 | 87 | 8 | 2 | 1 | 3 | 2 |

| Preceded by Detroit Cougars captains Reg Noble | Detroit Falcons captain 1930–31 | Succeeded by Carson Cooper |
