= Steamer Maxwell =

Canadian ice hockey player (1890–1975)

- Hockey Hall of Fame, 1962
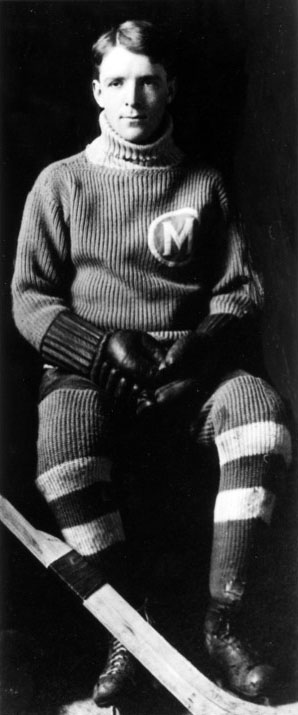
- Born: May 19, 1890 Winnipeg, Manitoba, Canada
- Died: September 11, 1975 (aged 85) Winnipeg, Manitoba, Canada
- Height: 5 ft 7 in (170 cm)
- Weight: 135 lb (61 kg; 9 st 9 lb)
- Position: Rover
- Played for: Winnipeg Hockey Club; Winnipeg Monarchs
- Playing career: 1909–1915

Frederick George "Steamer" Maxwell (May 19, 1890 – September 11, 1975) was a Canadian amateur ice hockey player. He played rover in the days of seven-man hockey at the turn of the 20th century, spending six seasons with the Winnipeg Monarchs of the Manitoba Hockey League (MHL) between 1909 and 1915. Considered one of the top players of his era, he won two Manitoba provincial championships with the Monarchs and was a member of the team that won the 1915 Allan Cup as Canadian senior amateur champions. Maxwell spurned multiple offers to turn professional and ultimately quit playing hockey when he learned some of his peers at the senior amateur level were getting paid.

A long-time coach at the senior level, Maxwell led the Winnipeg Falcons to an Allan Cup championship in 1920; the team went on to win an Olympic Gold medal as Canada's representative in the 1920 Olympic ice hockey tournament. He coached into the 1930s, leading several teams to senior and junior championships. Maxwell is an honoured member of the Manitoba Sports and Hockey Halls of Fame and was inducted into the Hockey Hall of Fame in 1962.

== Playing career ==
Quick on his feet, Maxwell's skating ability at rover earned him the nickname "Steamer". He began his senior career in 1909–10, appearing in one game with the Winnipeg Monarchs of the Manitoba Hockey League (MHL). In 1910–11, he scored six goals for the Monarchs in five games and was named to the league's second All-Star team. He scored seven goals in seven games for the Monarchs in 1911–12, and by the following season had been named the team's captain.

Maxwell scored three goals and two assists for the Monarchs in the 1913–14 season as the team won the city and provincial championships. By virtue of the title, the team was granted possession of the Allan Cup, emblematic of Canada's national senior-amateur championship. The team initially refused to defend the trophy against a challenge by the Kenora Thistles after the Cup's trustees ruled Dick Irvin ineligible. Facing the possibility of having to play with only six players against Kenora's seven, the Monarchs threatened to default. The game, held March 11, 1914, was ultimately played and Maxwell's speed and skating helped lead the Monarchs to a 6–2 victory. The team was unable to defend the trophy against a second challenge, played two nights later against the Regina Victorias. Maxwell scored a goal in a 5–4 defeat.

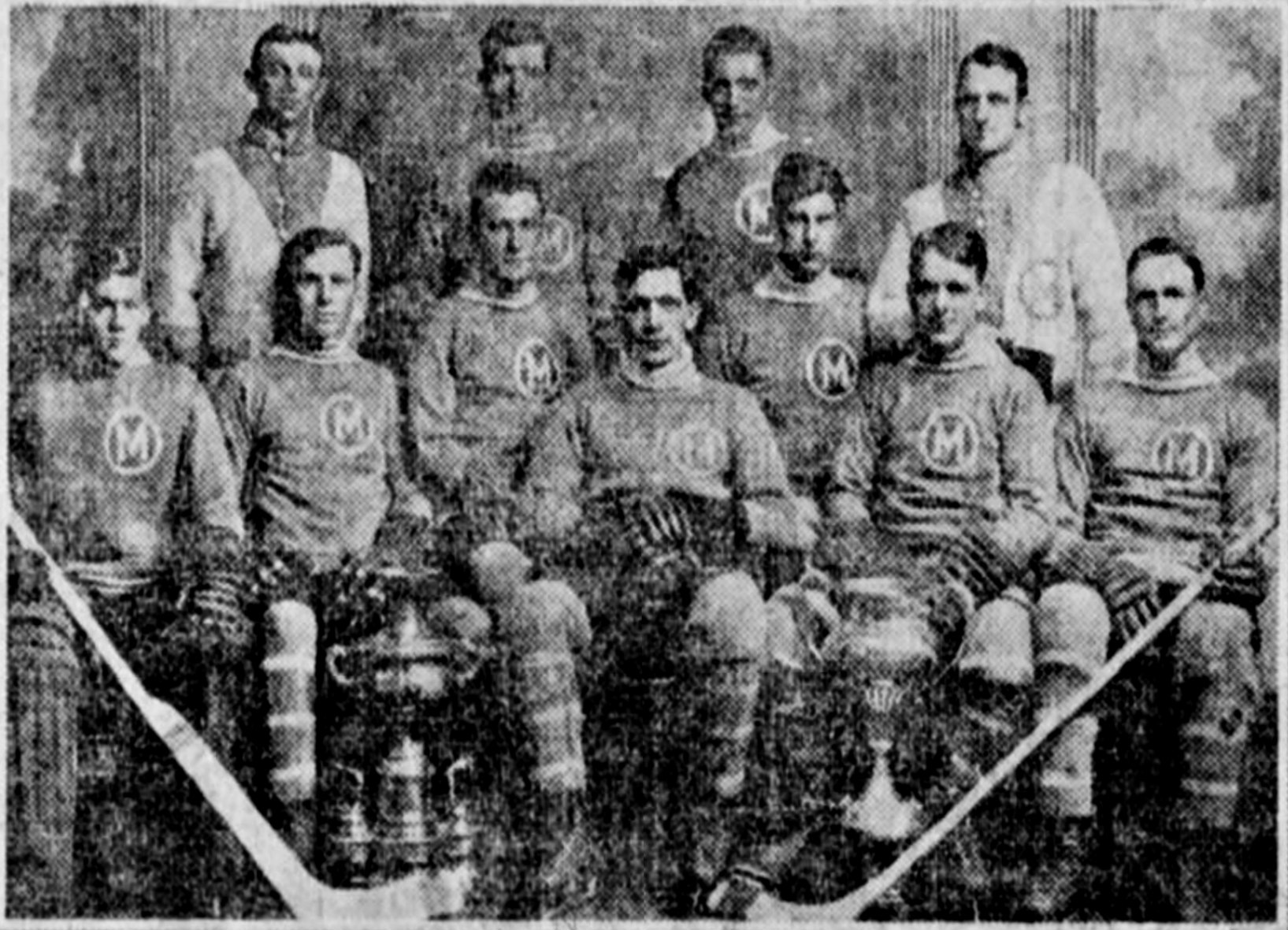
Winnipeg Monarchs in 1915. Steamer Maxwell is sitting second from right with the Allan Cup between his legs.

The Monarchs repeated as Manitoba provincial champions in 1914–15 as Maxwell again scored three goals and two assists during regular league play. The team reached the 1915 Allan Cup finals, where they challenged the Saskatchewan champion Melville Millionaires who held the Cup. Unlike the previous year's single-game contests, the 1915 final was played as a two-game, total-goals series. Melville defeated Winnipeg by a 4–3 score in the first game, but the Monarchs overcame a two-goal deficit in the second match to win 4–2 and win the series on an aggregate total of seven to six. There were no further challenges, and Maxwell and the Monarchs ended the season as Allan Cup champions.

Throughout his playing career, Maxwell received several offers to turn professional. Toronto Blueshirts of the National Hockey Association offered him $1,500 to join their team, while representatives of the Pacific Coast Hockey Association made an offer of $1,800 the following season. He turned both offers down, preferring to remain an amateur. His feelings on what constituted an amateur player were so strong that he quit playing hockey following the 1915 Allan Cup as the nature of the senior game at the time failed to meet his expectations: "When I played, I bought my own skates and boots. When I found out some of the others were getting paid, I quit."

== Coaching career ==
Olympic medal record

Men's Ice hockey
Gold medal – first place	1920 Antwerp	Team competition

Maxwell remained in the game, turning to coaching. He served two seasons as coach of the Winnipeg Monarchs before moving to the cross-town rival Winnipeg Falcons. He led the Falcons to the 1920 Allan Cup, defeating the University of Toronto Varsity Blues by scores of 8–3 and 3–2. The victory also earned his team the right to represent Canada at the first Olympic ice hockey tournament at the Summer Games in Antwerp. His business interests outside of hockey prevented Maxwell from travelling to Belgium with his team; however the International Ice Hockey Federation (IIHF) lists him as the coach for the gold medal winning Canadians, who outscored their opponents 29–1 in three games played.

Maxwell coached several Winnipeg teams throughout the 1920s and 1930s. He led the Winnipeg Rangers, Winnipeg Winnipegs and Elmwood Millionaires to Manitoba provincial senior championships in 1926, 1927 and 1930, respectively. He led the Millionaires' junior team to a provincial title that same season.

Maxwell briefly coached in the professional ranks, with the Winnipeg Maroons of the American Hockey Association in 1927–28. The Toronto Maple Leafs attempted to sign him to coach their National Hockey League club in 1931, however team owner Conn Smythe chose to hire Dick Irvin instead after Maxwell insisted on a three-year contract. Instead, Maxwell returned to the Winnipeg Monarchs, where he led their junior team to the western Canadian championship in 1931–32. In the Memorial Cup final, Maxwell's squad lost to the eastern champion Sudbury Cub Wolves.

Coaching the senior Monarchs, Maxwell led the team to the Manitoba Championship in 1933–34. Canadian Amateur Hockey Association invited the team to represent Canada at the 1935 World Championship. However, as with 1920, Maxwell was unable to travel to Europe with his team. The Monarchs went on to win the World Championship.

In addition to coaching, Maxwell was a long time referee. He frequently officiated matches in both Allan and Memorial Cup playoffs, as well as professional teams that traveled through Western Canada. He was recognized numerous times for his playing and coaching career. Maxwell is an honoured member of the Manitoba Hockey Hall of Fame, and was inducted into the Manitoba Sports Hall of Fame in 1988. That honour followed his 1962 induction into the Hockey Hall of Fame.

== Personal life ==
Outside of hockey, Maxwell owned a lumber business, F. G. Maxwell Co. Ltd, which he operated until his retirement in 1967. He was a partner with fellow Hall of Famer Charlie Gardiner until the latter's death in 1934. The company, which focused on plywood supply, was successful and ultimately made Maxwell a millionaire. Following his retirement, Maxwell turned to photography and world travel. He and his wife Ann resided in his hometown of Winnipeg. He had two sisters, Genevieve and Beatrice. Genevieve was herself a champion tennis player in Western Canada.

An avid baseball fan, Maxwell was among the founders of the Winnipeg Arena baseball club in 1908, and became the team's manager in 1912. At its peak, the team drew as many as 5,000 fans per game. As a player, manager or general manager, Maxwell was a member of eight Arena teams that won the Winnipeg city championship between 1908 and 1923. He was known for his quick, and often barbed, wit; His friends often told a story of an Arenas baseball game where, after failing to convince the umpire that it was too dark to play, Maxwell sent his players onto the field with lighted candles. In his later years, he served on the advisory board of the Winnipeg Goldeyes professional club.

== Career statistics ==
			Regular season					Playoffs
Season	Team	League	GP	G	A	Pts	PIM	GP	G	A	Pts	PIM
1909–10	Winnipeg Hockey Club	MHL	1	0	0	0	0	—	—	—	—	—
1910–11	Winnipeg Monarchs	MHL	5	6	0	6	—	—	—	—	—	—
1911–12	Winnipeg Monarchs	MHL	8	7	0	7	—	—	—	—	—	—
1912–13	Winnipeg Monarchs	MHL	8	2	0	2	—	—	—	—	—	—
1913–14	Winnipeg Monarchs	MHL	8	3	2	5	6	2	1	0	1	6
1914–15	Winnipeg Monarchs	MHL	7	3	2	5	22	1	1	0	1	6
Senior totals			37	21	4	25	28	3	2	0	2	12
