= Winnipeg Monarchs (senior) =

Canadian senior ice hockey team from Winnipeg, Manitoba

- City: Winnipeg, Manitoba, Canada
- League: Manitoba Hockey Association (1910–1922)
- Founded: 1906
- Operated: 1906–1936
- Colors: Purple, White

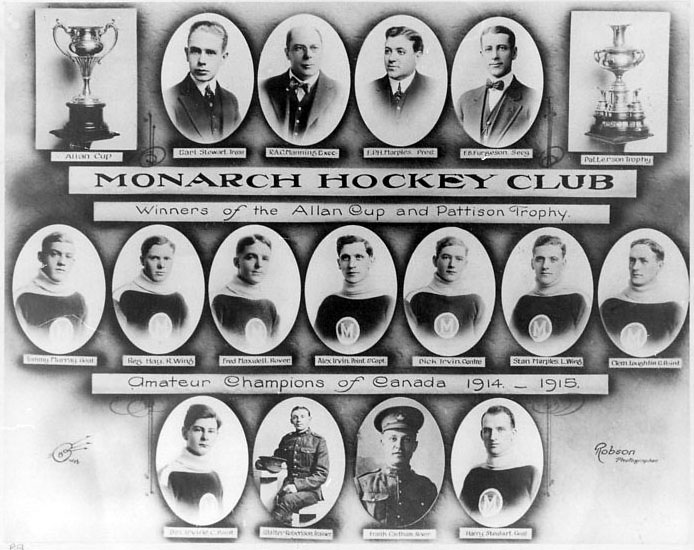
Winnipeg Monarchs team collage in 1915

The Winnipeg Monarchs were a Canadian senior ice hockey team from Winnipeg, Manitoba, that was organized in 1906. The Monarchs won the 1915 Allan Cup as the Canadian Senior Hockey Champions. In 1935 the Monarchs won gold for Canada at the World Ice Hockey Championships.

== History ==
The Monarchs were founded in the 1906 as a team of students from the Victoria-Albert School in Winnipeg, who won the juvenile age group championship of a Winnipeg minor ice hockey league during the 1906–07 season. The Monarchs formed teams at the juvenile and intermediate levels for the 1907–08 season, with both teams winning their respective league championships. The Monarchs went on to win three consecutive intermediate championships, with a roster that included Alex Irvin and Charles Tobin. Fred Marples became secretary of the Monarchs in 1909, and co-ordinated exhibition tours in the United States in 1910 and 1912. The team was admitted to the Winnipeg Amateur Hockey League for the 1910–11 season, but did not win a game. The team won one game during the 1911–12 season then merged with the intermediate level Winnipeg Strathconas in 1912.

=== 1912–13 season ===
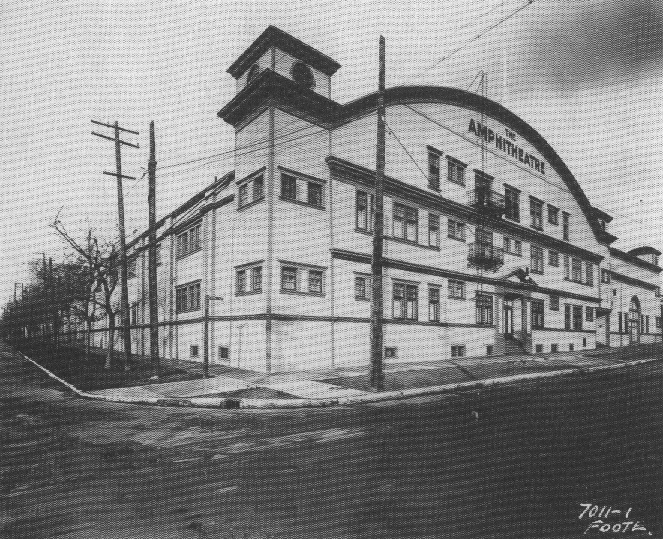
Winnipeg Amphitheatre

The Monarchs merged with the Winnipeg Strathconas as of the 1912–13 season due to struggles in finding ice time, and elected Marples as their president. He was also elected as the secretary-treasurer of the Winnipeg Amateur Hockey League. He arranged extra time at the Winnipeg Amphitheatre for practices and games, and felt that it would improve the chances of the Monarchs winning the Allan Cup. The decision to use the Amphitheatre caused a rift within the league which had an agreement in the previous season to play all games at the Winnipeg Auditorium. Marples and the Monarchs felt that the league did not have the authority to bind any club to any single rink, and that the Amphitheatre had better amenities for the players and spectators. League president W. F. Taylor cast a tie-breaking vote to uphold the agreement to play all games at the Auditorium.

=== 1913–14 season and the Allan Cup ===
In the 1913–14 season, the league chose to play its games at both the Amphitheatre and the Auditorium. Marples resurrected the Strathconas senior team and entered them into the Independent Amateur Hockey League, in addition to operating the Monarchs. He felt it necessary to give the younger players more opportunities to practice and play in order to develop talent, secured more ice time and operated the Strathconas as a reserve team. The Monarchs won the Winnipeg Amateur Hockey League regular season title and were chosen to defend the first challenge for the 1914 Allan Cup on behalf of the league.

The Allan Cup trophy

The Winnipeg Amateur Hockey League debated whether or not players from the Strathconas were in a lower level of hockey and eligible to be a reserve player. Trustees for the Allan Cup also struggled to determine player eligibility since there was no authoritative national body to classify leagues by the level of play. When Allan Cup trustee William Northey ruled that Dick Irvin of the Strathconas was ineligible to compete, the Monarchs refused to defend the Allan Cup. Marples considered the Strathconas to be a reserve team for the Monarchs and that the decision was unfair to his team. After three days of negotiating, the Monarchs agreed to play without Irvin in a one-game Allan Cup challenge versus the Kenora Thistles, instead of the customary two-game series decided on total goals scored. The Monarchs won by a 6–2 score versus the Kenora Thistles, then lost the second Allan Cup challenge in a one-game final by a 5–4 score to the Regina Victorias.

Players on the Winnipeg Monarchs were presented with motorcycles as gifts after the Allan Cup playoffs. The action was criticized by members of the Manitoba branch of the Amateur Athletic Union of Canada (AAU of C) for being against amateur principles and promoting professionalism, despite that the AAU of C constitution did not forbid gifts. Marples defended the action and stated that he and the club would ensure the players did not exchange or sell the motorcycles for profit.

=== 1914–15 season and the Allan Cup ===
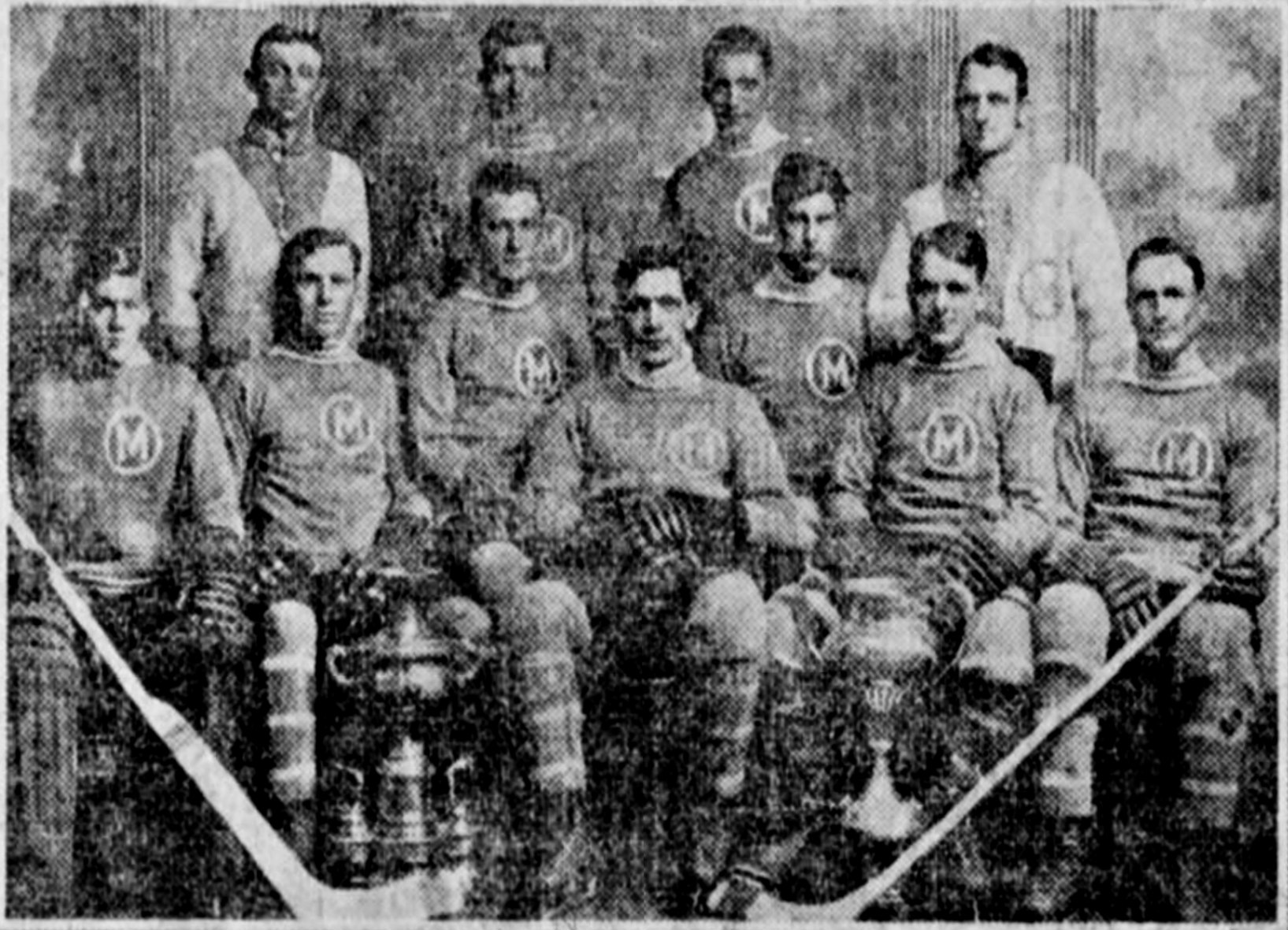
Winnipeg Monarchs with the Allan Cup in 1915. Back row, from left: Walter Robertson (trainer), Dick Irvin, Stan Marples, Harry Stuart. Front row, from left: Tommy Murray, Reg Hay, Frank Cadham, Alex Irvin, Del Irvine, Steamer Maxwell, Clem Loughlin.

The Winnipeg Amateur Hockey League met with Allan Cup trustees in June 1914, and agreed on the need to form a national commission to govern ice hockey in Canada and competition for the trophy. The meeting formed the Manitoba Amateur Hockey Association (MAHA) with Marples appointed as its secretary. The Canadian Amateur Hockey Association (CAHA) was established on December 4, 1914, with Marples representing the Winnipeg Monarchs at the meeting.

The Winnipeg Monarchs repeated as league champions in the 1914–15 season. In the 1915 Allan Cup playoffs, the Monarchs defeated the Winnipeg Falcons by a total score of 27–14, defeated Fort William by a total score of 16–10, the defeated Edmonton by a total score of 17–8 to reach the final series. The Monarchs defeated the Melville Millionaires by a 4–2 score, and won the 1915 Allan Cup by a two-game total score of 7–6.

=== World War I patriotic hockey ===
The Winnipeg Amateur Patriotic Hockey League became the Winnipeg Military Hockey League during the 1917–18 season. Its teams were named for battles fought during World War I, which included the Monarchs temporarily named Ypres and managed by Marples. The Monarchs reverted to their old name as of the 1918–19 season, and resumed competing for the Allan Cup with Marples continuing as president of the team.

=== 1930s and the World Championships ===
In 1934, the Senior Monarchs won the Manitoba Senior Championship, and in 1935 they represented Canada at the World Ice Hockey Championships held in Switzerland. The 1935 National Team roster included three 1932 gold medal-winning Olympians: Roy Henkel, Victor Lindquist and Romeo Rivers. The team was undefeated during the seven-game tournament, scoring 44 goals while allowing an average of only one goal per game. In the final game the Monarchs defeated Switzerland by a score of 4–2 to win the world championship title for Canada.

After the winning the world championship title, the Monarchs continued to tour Europe where they played in 66 exhibition games before returning home to Canada with a 63–1–2 record. Following this successful European tour, the Winnipeg Monarch Senior Club ceased operations.

== NHL alumni ==
List of alumni who played in the National Hockey League (NHL):

- Bobby Benson
- Helge Bostrom
- Turk Broda
- Cecil Browne
- Percy Galbraith
- Haldor Halderson
- George Hay
- Dick Irvin
- Ching Johnson
- Clem Loughlin
- Wilf Loughlin
- Cully Wilson
- Hal Winkler

== Other Winnipeg Monarchs teams ==
Two junior teams would later use the Monarchs name. The Winnipeg Monarchs competed in the Manitoba Junior Hockey League from 1930 to 1978. The Monarchs name was also used by a Western Canada Hockey League team during the 1976–77 season. The Winnipeg Minor Hockey Association uses the Monarchs name in its AAA programs.
