= W. F. Taylor =

Canadian ice hockey administrator (1877–1945)

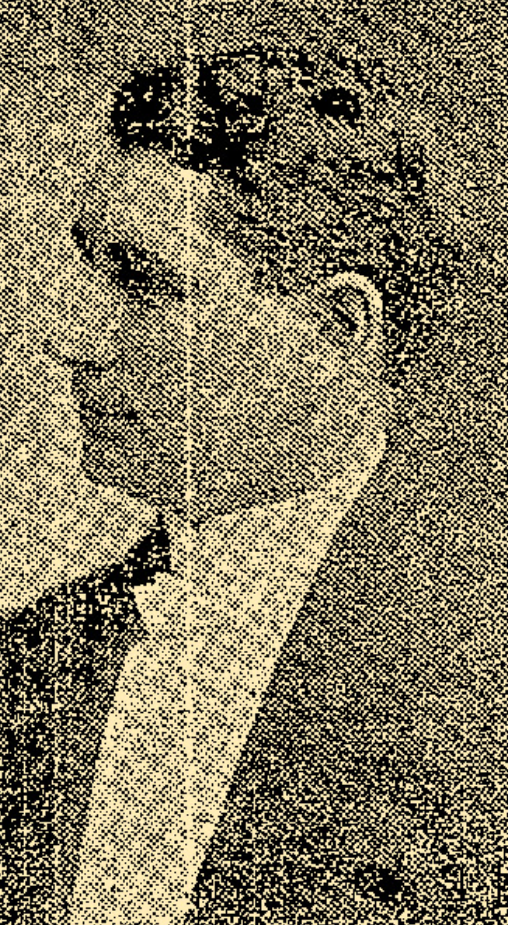
- Born: William Franklin Taylor; May 16, 1877; Campbellford, Ontario, Canada
- Died: April 12, 1945 (aged 67); Winnipeg, Manitoba, Canada
- Resting place: Cathedral of St. John Cemetery
- Education: University of Toronto
- Occupation: Dentist
- Years active: 1898 – 1945
- Known for: Founding president of the Canadian Amateur Hockey Association and the Manitoba Amateur Hockey Association
- Awards: Manitoba Hockey Hall of Fame

William Franklin Taylor (May 16, 1877 – April 12, 1945) was a Canadian ice hockey administrator. He was the founding president of both the Canadian Amateur Hockey Association (CAHA) and the Manitoba Amateur Hockey Association in 1914, and also served as president of the Winnipeg Amateur Hockey League. He sought for the Allan Cup to be symbollic of the amateur hockey championship of Canada, and to establish a national authority to oversee competition for the trophy. He allied the CAHA with the Amateur Athletic Union of Canada against professionalism and to promote amateur sport and expand hockey in Canada. He supported a desire by the players to govern their own affairs, to standardize ice hockey rules and ice hockey rink dimensions, and recognition of the authority and judgment of on-ice officials. Taylor assisted with patriotic fundraising to contribute to the World War I effort in Canada, and served the community in Winnipeg as a leading member of the Elks and the Shriners. He sat on the board of governors for The Children's Hospital of Winnipeg and the local Children's Aid Society, and was posthumously inducted into the Manitoba Hockey Hall of Fame in 1992.

== Early life and education ==
William Franklin Taylor was born on May 16, 1877, in Campbellford, Ontario. He grew up in a family that included four boys and two girls, to parents Jane Fraser and dentist John Taylor. Taylor graduated from the University of Toronto Faculty of Dentistry and was admitted to the Royal College of Dental Surgeons of Ontario.

Taylor relocated to Winnipeg in 1898, and practiced dentistry there for the remainder of his life along with his brother J. F. Taylor. Taylor was a member of the Benevolent and Protective Order of Elks and the ruler of the Winnipeg lodge. In January 1908, he was appointed deputy supreme exalted ruler for Western Canada.

== Early Winnipeg hockey career ==
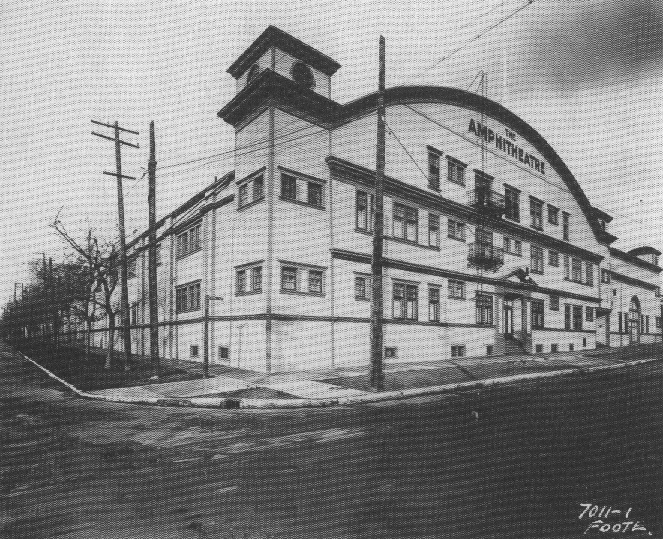
Winnipeg Amphitheatre

Taylor was elected president of the Winnipeg Amateur Hockey League on November 14, 1912, as a compromise to have an outside person settle internal disagreements. The Winnipeg Monarchs led by Fred Marples had made their own arrangements to play and practice at the Winnipeg Amphitheatre, whereas the league had an agreement for teams to use the Winnipeg Auditorium which was preferred by the Winnipeg Hockey Club and the Winnipeg Victorias. Teams also disagreed on the cost of ice time, the amount of practice time and heating for the spectators in the seating area. Taylor cast a tie-breaking vote to uphold a decision by the previous executive to play all league games at the Auditorium.

Taylor was re-elected president in November 1913 by acclamation, and thanked all players in the league who had declined professional contracts to remain as amateurs. Disagreements persisted between the teams over the location of games and the league agreed to allow teams to choose their own home ice location. Taylor released the 1913–14 season schedule which included games at both the Amphitheatre and Auditorium, and reached an agreement where season tickets were sold to give spectators access to both rinks.

In January 1914, the league debated whether players from leagues from elsewhere in Manitoba and Northwestern Ontario were eligible to be a reserve player in the Winnipeg league. Debate focused on whether these leagues were an equal level of senior hockey, or a lower level of intermediate hockey. The issue was temporarily resolved by asking permission from the other league for the player to be a reserve in another league. The issue resurfaced again in the national playoffs for the 1914 Allan Cup. Trustees for the Allan Cup struggled to determine player eligibility since there was no authoritative national body to classify leagues by the level of play, and determine who was a senior level player compared to an intermediate level player.

== Founding of a Manitoba hockey body ==
The Allan Cup was the championship trophy for amateur senior ice hockey in Canada.

Members of the Winnipeg Amateur Hockey League met on June 23, 1914, and agreed to form a commission to oversee hockey in Manitoba. Taylor was appointed chairman of the provisional Manitoba Hockey Commission, which sought to merge into a national commission when such a body became established.

The Allan Cup trustee in Western Canada, Claude C. Robinson, suggested that a governing body be formed for hockey in Canada, which was echoed by similar calls from The Winnipeg Tribune and the Winnipeg Free Press. The proposal was backed by clubs in Western Canada and letters were sent to all amateur hockey clubs in Canada to attend a national meeting. The stated purpose of a national commission was to discuss revisions to the Allan Cup competition format and deadlines, to standardize ice hockey rules and ice hockey rink dimensions, and to establish regular annual meetings for national hockey issues.

Taylor was elected the first president of the Manitoba Hockey Commission on July 7, 1914. Recommendations were taken to form a constitution by July, then delegates would to be chosen to attend the meeting to establish a national body. In October 1914, athletic organizations in Manitoba combined to form an Athletic Patriotic Committee to support the World War I effort in Canada. Taylor was named an executive member to arrange sporting events for patriotic fundraising.

The Winnipeg Amateur Hockey League met for its annual meeting in November 1914, and questioned if enough teams would exist for the upcoming season due to a shortage of players during World War I. Taylor stated his willingness to step down as president but would accept another term to perpetuate the league. He supported a desire by the players to govern their own affairs and league officers that were open-minded. He was re-elected to a third term and the league endorsed donating a portion of profits towards patriotic funds.

The Manitoba Hockey Commission met later in November to discuss additional recommendations for a national meeting, and sought for the Allan Cup to be recognized as the championship trophy for amateur hockey in Canada, and that the national commission be the authority to decide on which leagues and players were eligible. Manitoba clubs planned to send their own delegates to the national meeting, although Taylor was designated as the only spokesperson to speak for Manitoba. He was tasked with convincing other teams and associations to accept the proposal, despite reports from the Winnipeg Free Press that Eastern Canada and the Ontario Hockey Association did not show much interest in founding a national body.

== Founding of a Canadian hockey body ==
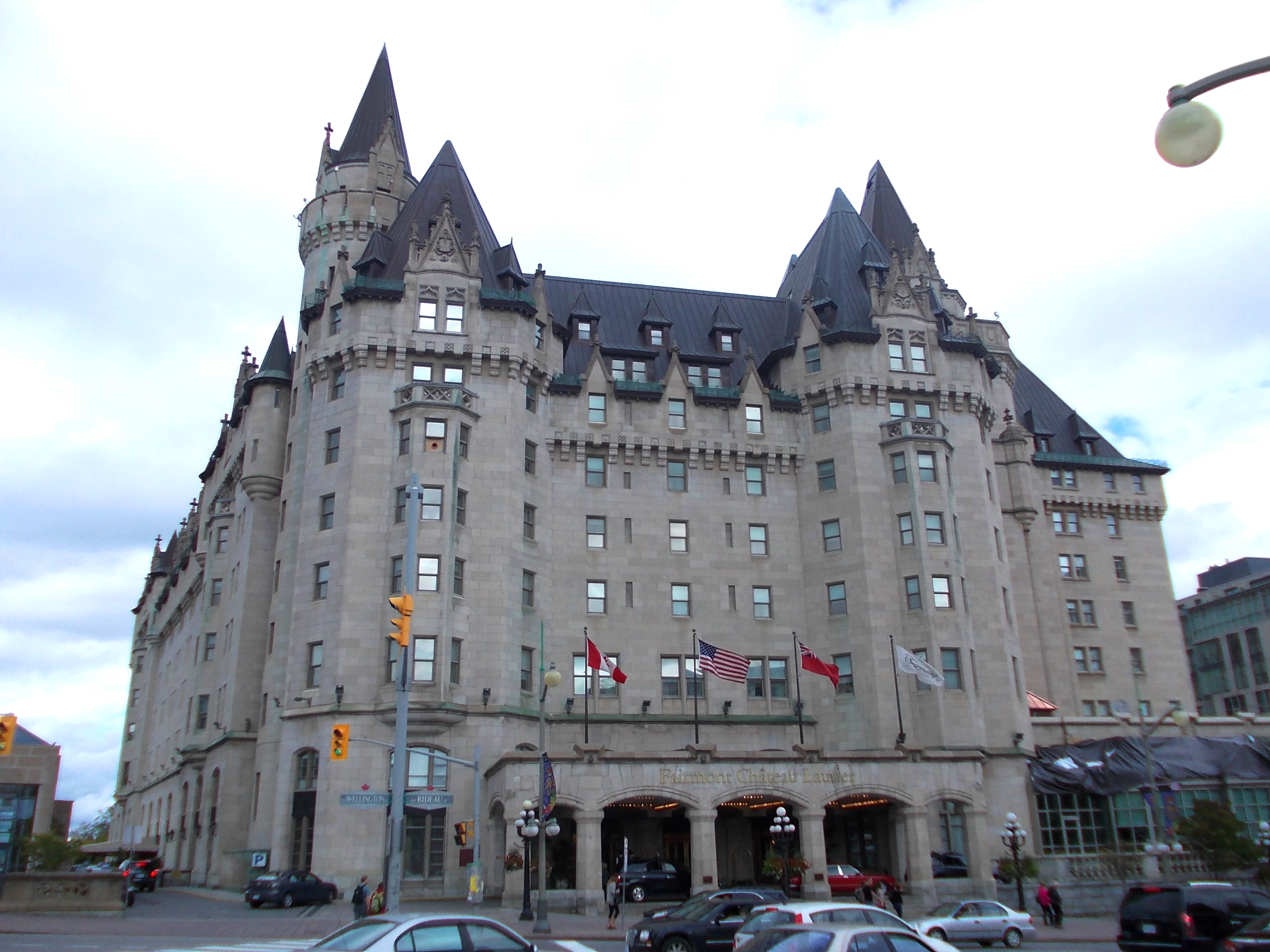
Hotel Château Laurier

The Canadian Amateur Hockey Association (CAHA) was founded on December 4, 1914, at the Hotel Château Laurier in Ottawa, with Taylor elected as its first president. The CAHA adopted a constitution, drafted by-laws and registration rules for players, and planned to organize eight branches across the nine provinces of Canada. The Allan Cup was chosen to represent the CAHA championship of a provincial playoffs system, although the cup remained under the control of its trustees according to the deed of gift from H. Montagu Allan. Taylor reached an agreement with Allan Cup trustee William Northey, that the CAHA could manage Allan Cup games on a temporary basis and be the beneficiary of profits overseen by the trustees.

Taylor recommended at the meeting for the CAHA to apply for articles of alliance with the Amateur Athletic Union of Canada (AAU of C). The CAHA was accepted as an affiliate two days later and abided by AAU of C policies against professionalism and to promote amateur sport in Canada. Taylor was subsequently named to the affiliations and alliances committee of the AAU of C.

Taylor presided over the first annual meeting of the Manitoba Hockey Commission on December 26, 1914, which saw its named changed to become the Manitoba Amateur Hockey Association (MAHA) to align with the CAHA. The MAHA ratified the player registration rules put in place by the CAHA to maintain amateurism and exclude professionals, and sought to expand within Manitoba by recruiting existing leagues to join.

Taylor determined the 1915 Allan Cup playoffs format by having names drawn out of a hat by Winnipeg mayor Richard Deans Waugh. Taylor called an emergency meeting of the CAHA on March 15, to resolve registration and rules inconsistencies and to prevent protests during Allan Cup competition. The CAHA resolved that the constitutions and by-laws for all of its branches must be in accordance with those of the CAHA, and requested copies of all such constitutions and by-laws to be submitted for approval at the next general meeting. The CAHA also decided to centralize the final three series for the 1916 Allan Cup, where the three challengers would meet the reigning champion in Winnipeg.

== World War I and patriotic hockey ==
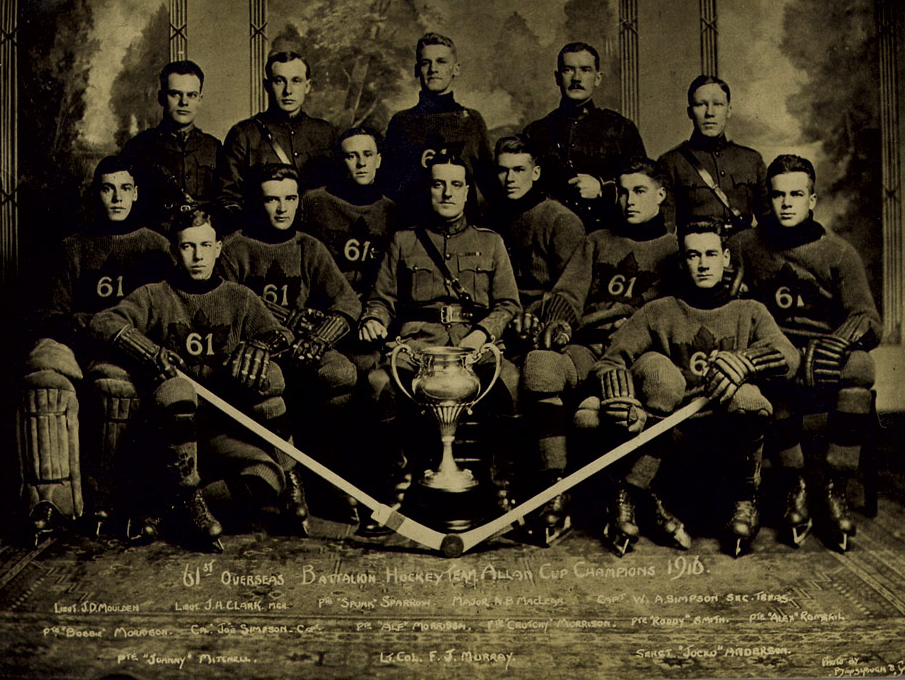
Winnipeg 61st Battalion with the Allan Cup in 1916

Taylor expected hockey as usual for the 1915–16 season and stated that teams in Winnipeg planned to play despite decreased talent being available due to enlistments to serve in World War I. He chose to retire in November 1915 after three seasons as the Winnipeg Amateur Hockey League president. He was succeeded by Robert McKay as president. Taylor was re-elected president of the MAHA in November 1915 and sought to continue hockey for the patriotic fund while temporarily suspending the Allan Cup competition as recommended by the Winnipeg Amateur Hockey League.

Following a recommendation by the AAU of C, Taylor asked the CAHA branches for a mail-in vote on whether or not to hold an annual meeting in December 1915. He was in favour is having the meeting since the association was only a year old and that continued communication was necessary for the CAHA to grow in its formative years. He suggested that the AAU of C and the Canadian Amateur Lacrosse Association hold their annual meetings concurrently to reduce costs. When the mail-in vote was inconclusive, Taylor asked those against a meeting to reconsider and suggested that the furthest branches send a proxy vote. The meeting went ahead as Taylor planned on December 10, 1915, in Winnipeg. The CAHA decided to have Allan Cup competition as usual which was supported by the cup's trustees. Taylor was named to the committee to review the constitutions of each branch of the CAHA, and was succeeded as president by Captain James T. Sutherland, the president of the Ontario Hockey Association.

Taylor remained involved with the Winnipeg Amateur Hockey League which had renamed itself the Patriotic Hockey League, and was appointed to the discipline committee. He felt that a referee's decision should be final and had no sympathy for teams protesting the judgment of on-ice officials. He assisted in overseeing finances for the league which raised C$4,000 for the patriotic fund. He represented the CAHA in presenting the Allan Cup trophy to the Winnipeg 61st Battalion who played the season in the Patriotic Hockey League.

Taylor supported having an annual CAHA meeting in 1916 to promote the game and to perpetuate the national association. He also advocated for someone to fill the president's position since Sutherland had been deployed to Europe to serve in the war. Taylor was succeeded as president of the MAHA by W. M. Noble in November 1916. MAHA officers then favoured not to have a CAHA meeting in 1916, and Ontario Hockey Association vice-president J. F. Paxton was named acting president of the CAHA.

== Later life and community service ==
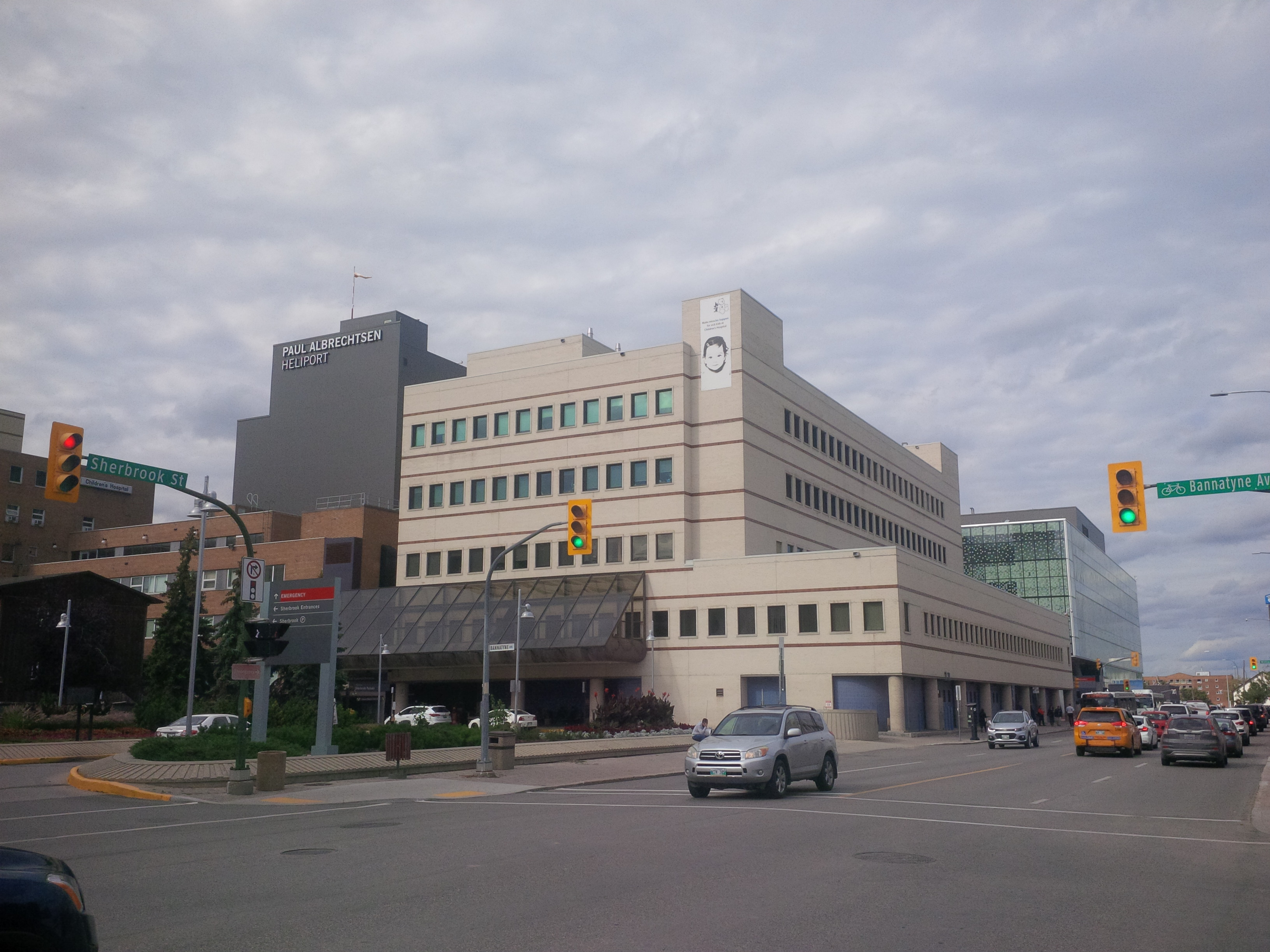
Children's Hospital of Winnipeg

Taylor represented the CAHA at a banquet for the Winnipeg Falcons in May 1920, after the team became the first gold medalists in ice hockey at the Olympic Games. He became involved in community service as a freemason in the Scottish Rite Prince Rupert Lodge AF and AM, and was a potentate of the Shriners in the Khartum Temple of the Shrine. The Shriners established a facility for crippled children as part of The Children's Hospital of Winnipeg in 1925. The new wing included 20 beds and was funded by the Khartum Temple to care for children from the Canadian Prairies. Taylor served on the board of governors for the hospital, and was named to the dental board of the Children's Aid Society of Winnipeg in 1936.

Taylor attended the silver jubilee of the MAHA on October 22, 1938, at the Fort Garry Hotel in Winnipeg, where five of six past presidents were guests of honour. The CAHA chose to hold its silver jubilee on April 11, 1939, in Winnipeg, to recognize the contributions of Taylor and other Manitoba officials in founding the CAHA in 1914. Taylor was one of six persons in attendance at the silver jubilee who had attended the original meeting of the CAHA in 1914, and was one of the 11 former CAHA presidents to be honoured. In his address to the delegates at the silver jubilee, Taylor told a story of humble beginnings of the CAHA.

"At that first meeting we had the ideal of serving the youth of Canada but we started in a small and inauspicious way. Today, I am proud to say, the CAHA is the strongest organization in sport in Canada, the strongest, in fact, in the world".

— W. F. Taylor—April 10, 1939

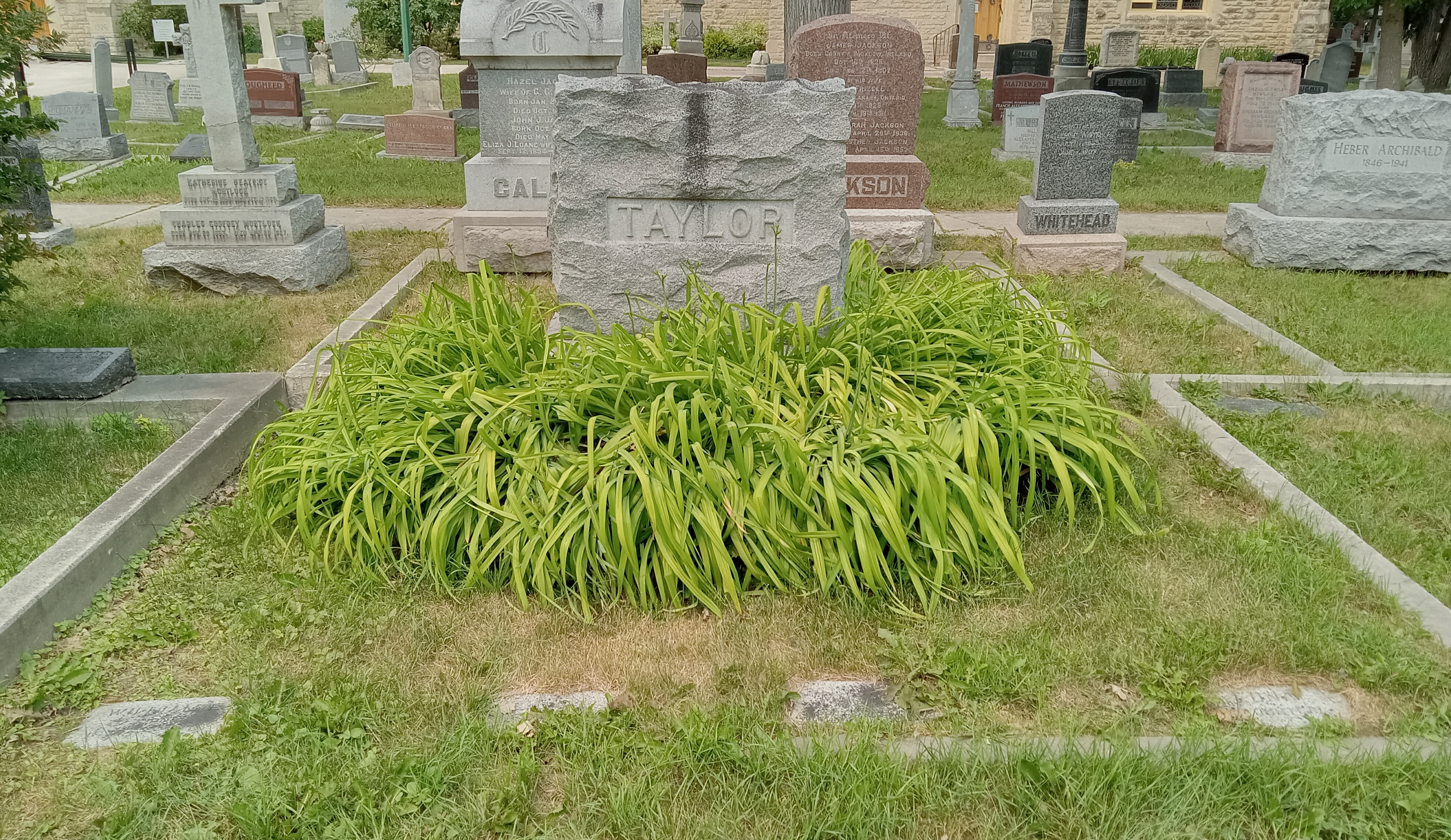
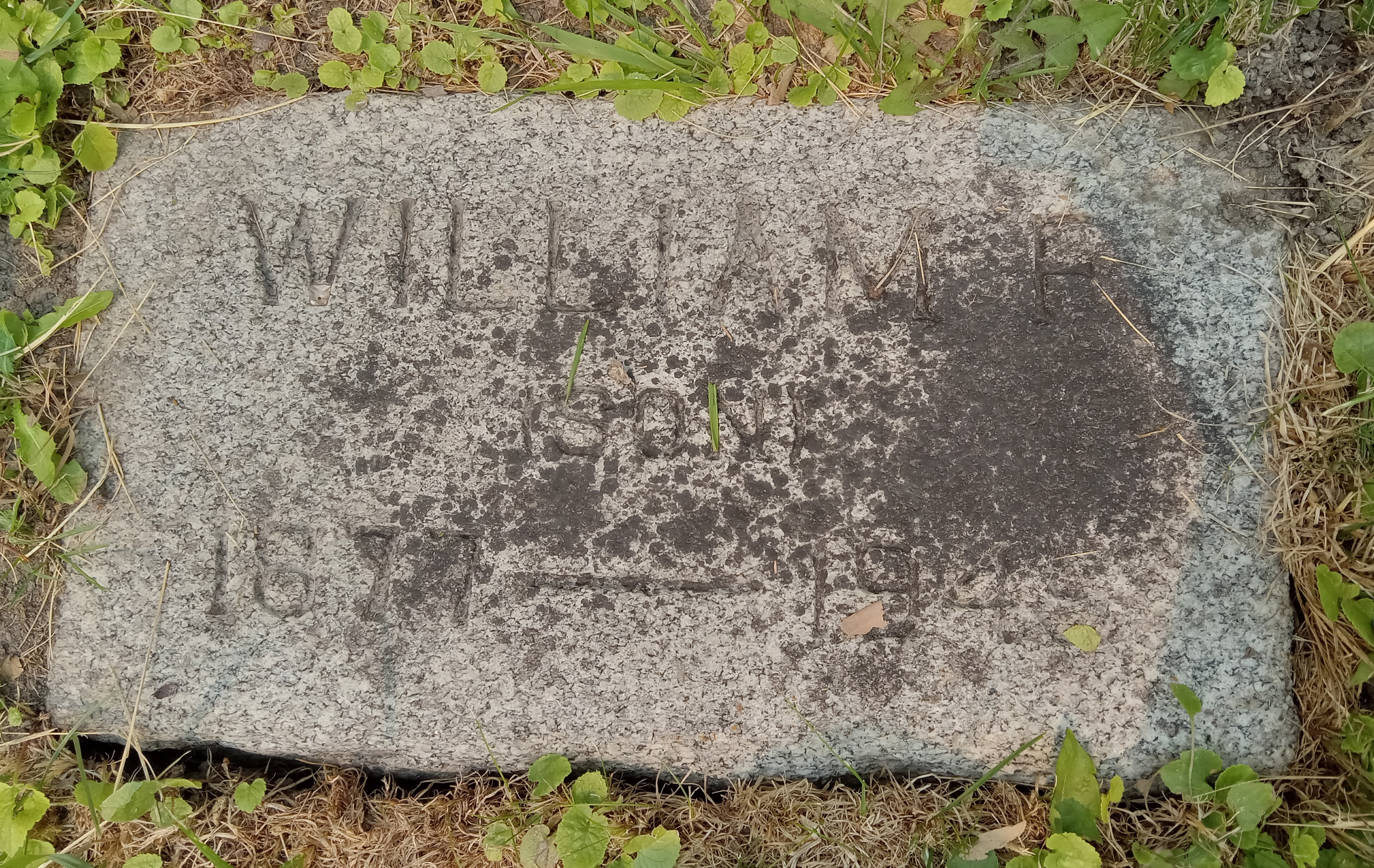
Taylor's grave markers at Cathedral of St. John Cemetery

Taylor was married to Nancy Taylor and had two daughters. He died at home in Winnipeg on April 12, 1945, and was interred in the family plot at the Cathedral of St. John Cemetery in Winnipeg.

== Legacy and honours ==
The Winnipeg Free Press credited Taylor for handling contentious hockey issues in a business-like manner, making impartial rulings and being a peacemaker. The Winnipeg Tribune credited his efforts for retaining on-ice officials amid growing hooliganism by spectators. He was named honorary president of the Winnipeg Amateur Hockey League immediately upon his retirement. He was the honorary president of the CAHA from 1915 to 1919, and was presented with an engraved medal as its past-president when the CAHA established the practice in March 1925. He was also the honorary president of the MAHA from 1916 to 1934.

After Taylor's death, the CAHA observed a moment of silence for him at its annual meeting in April 1945. The Shriners' Hospital for Crippled Children in Winnipeg which he helped establish, was replaced by a new facility in June 1949. He was posthumously inducted into the Manitoba Hockey Hall of Fame in 1992. The CAHA merged into Hockey Canada in 1994, and the MAHA evolved into Hockey Manitoba. He was since made the namesake of the Dr. W. F. Taylor Memorial Scholarship maintained by Hockey Manitoba.

== Bibliography ==
- McKinley, Michael (2014). It's Our Game: Celebrating 100 Years Of Hockey Canada. Toronto, Ontario: Viking Press. ISBN 978-0-670-06817-3.
