= Fred McCulloch =

Canadian ice hockey player

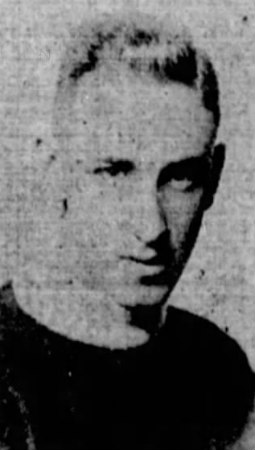
- McCulloch around 1915
- Born: March 5, 1892; Carleton Place, Ontario, Canada
- Died: August 11, 1966 (aged 74); Vancouver, British Columbia
- Position: Goaltender
- Played for: Victoria Aristocrats
- Playing career: 1909–1929

Frederick Fisher McCulloch (March 5, 1892 – August 11, 1966) was a Canadian professional ice hockey player. He played as a goaltender with the Victoria Aristocrats of the Pacific Coast Hockey Association during the 1915–16 season.

Prior to joining the PCHA McCulloch had won the Allan Cup (as Canadian national amateur champions) in 1914 with the Regina Victorias.
