= Fred Wilson (ice hockey) =

Canadian ice hockey and football player (1892–1971)

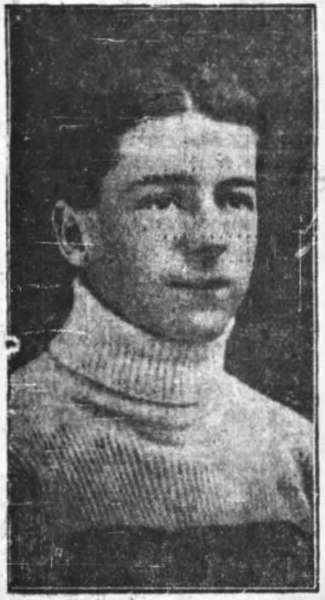
- Wilson circa 1913–14
- Born: October 3, 1892; Hastings, Ontario, Canada
- Died: January 18, 1971 (aged 78)
- Height: 5 ft 7 in (170 cm)
- Weight: 160 lb (73 kg; 11 st 6 lb)
- Position: Centre
- Shot: Right
- Played for: Regina Capitals
- Playing career: 1910–1928

Frederick Cornelius Wilson (October 3, 1892 – January 18, 1971) was a Canadian professional ice hockey and football player. He played with the Regina Capitals of the Western Canada Hockey League during the 1921–22 season. He was also a member of the 1914 Regina Victorias that captured the Allan Cup as senior amateur champions of Canada.

Wilson was inducted into the Saskatchewan Sports Hall of Fame as a football player in 1974, having played for the Regina Rugby Club and Regina Roughriders.

== Statistics ==
=== Regular season and playoffs ===
			Regular season					Playoffs
Season	Team	League	GP	G	A	Pts	PIM	GP	G	A	Pts	PIM
1921–22	Regina Capitals	WCHL	10	1	1	2	2	3	0	0	0	0
