= Richard Deans Waugh =

Canadian politician

Mayor Richard Deans Waugh

23rd Mayor of Winnipeg

Personal details
- Born: 23 March 1868 Melrose, Scotland
- Died: 20 May 1938 (aged 70)
- Spouse: Harriet S. Logan (m. 1892)

Richard Deans Waugh (23 March 1868 – 20 May 1938) was a Canadian politician, the 23rd Mayor of Winnipeg in 1912 and again from 1915 to 1916.

Waugh was born in Melrose, Scotland and moved to Canada in 1881 initially working in a lawyer's office before he entered the real estate business. Melrose was among those who established the Winnipeg Real Estate Exchange.

In 1897 Thomson Beattie moved to Winnipeg and partnered with Waugh to open Haslam Land Co. Beattie would die on the sinking of the Titanic in 1912.

His municipal political career included serving on city council, chairing the city's Parks Board from 1904 to 1908, then as Winnipeg's Controller from 1909 to 1911 before his first term as Mayor in 1912. He especially called for the development of municipal playgrounds while mayor.

Waugh was particularly noted for his participation in curling and served as president of the Manitoba Curling Association and Winnipeg's Granite Curling Club. Canadian Amateur Hockey Association president W. F. Taylor had Waugh determine the 1915 Allan Cup playoffs format by drawing names out of a hat.

Following the Treaty of Versailles, Waugh became a member of the commission which oversaw the Saarland region while its coal resources were shipped to France. Waugh resigned from the Saarland Commission due to his disagreements with the group's activities.

Today, his name is commemorated in Winnipeg as Waugh Road.
