= Charles Tobin =

Canadian ice hockey player (1885–1924)

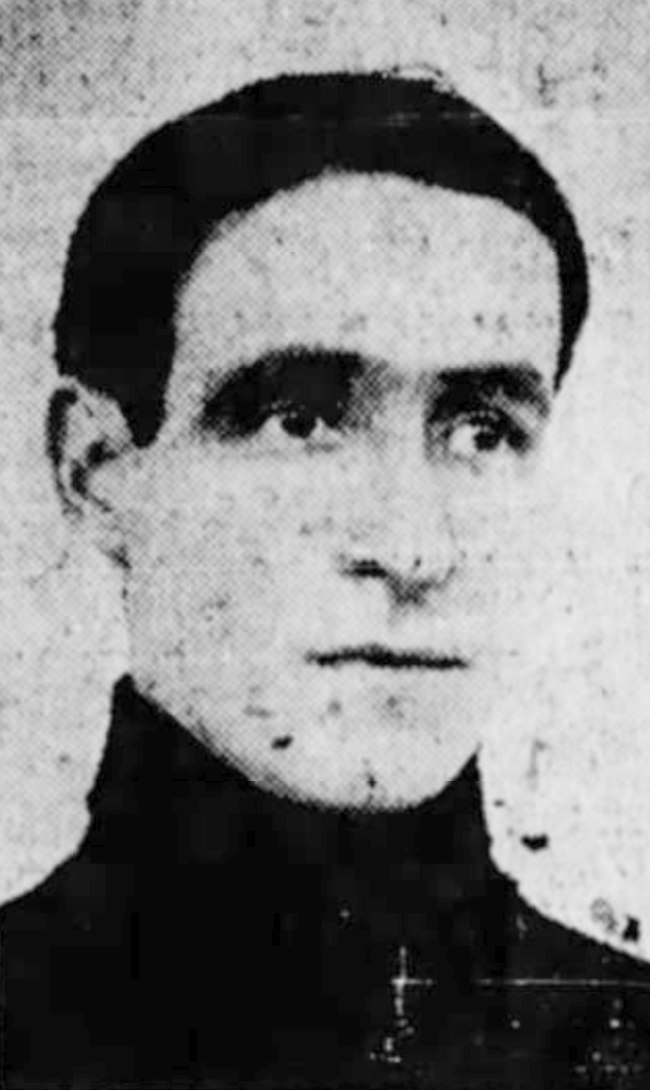
- Born: November 24, 1885 Winnipeg, Manitoba, Canada
- Died: May 30, 1924 (aged 38) Portland, Oregon, USA
- Height: 5 ft 10 in (178 cm)
- Weight: 160 lb (73 kg; 11 st 6 lb)
- Position: Right wing
- Shot: Right
- Played for: New Westminster Royals; Portland Rosebuds; Seattle Metropolitans; Vancouver Millionaires; Victoria Cougars
- Playing career: 1917–1922

Charles Stuart Tobin (November 24, 1885 – May 30, 1924) was a Canadian professional ice hockey player. Tobin played 175 games in various professional and amateur leagues, including the Pacific Coast Hockey Association (PCHA). Amongst the PCHA teams he played for were the New Westminster Royals, Portland Rosebuds, Seattle Metropolitans, Vancouver Millionaires and Victoria Cougars.

== Personal life ==
Tobin was born in Winnipeg, Manitoba. He died in 1924 at St. Vincent's Hospital in Portland, Oregon after illness due to ulcers of the stomach.

== Playing career ==
Tobin first played senior-level ice hockey with the Edmonton Thistles in 1904–05. Starting in 1906, Tobin played for several teams in early western Canada professional leagues, such as Battleford of the Alberta Professional League, Winnipeg Monarchs, Winnipeg Shamrocks and Winnipeg Hockey Club of the Manitoba leagues, Prince Albert, Saskatoon and Moose Jaw of the Saskatchewan Professional League.

Hockey on the Canadian Prairies was often strenuous due to the weather and the physical nature of the game, and once, while Tobin was playing with North Battleford in the city of Battleford, the temperature was so low that the players had to use alcohol rubs to fight off frostbite. And in December 1907, while playing for the Winnipeg Hockey Club in a qualifying test game, he was assaulted by Joe Hall in a particularly rough contest and had to be carried off the ice.

"The 'Pegs were going down the ice and Hall had just jumped into the game when he and Tobin came together. Tobin was knocked down and as Hall circled past him he swung his stick around with the result that it crashed into Tobin's head with a sickening sound and the 'Peg player was stretched on the ice, afterwards being carried off."

— Winnipeg Tribune describing Joe Hall's attack on Tobin on December 19, 1907

In 1912, the new PCHA was formed and Tobin joined the league in its second season, in 1912–13, playing for the New Westminster Royals. Tobin would play the bulk of his career in the PCHA, playing with the Portland Rosebuds, Victoria Aristocrats, Seattle Metropolitans and Vancouver Millionaires. Several of the teams were PCHA champions and Tobin played in the 1916, 1920 and 1922 Stanley Cup Final series with the Rosebuds, Metropolitans and Millionaires, but did not play for a Stanley Cup champion, losing in the fifth and deciding game all three times.

== Statistics ==
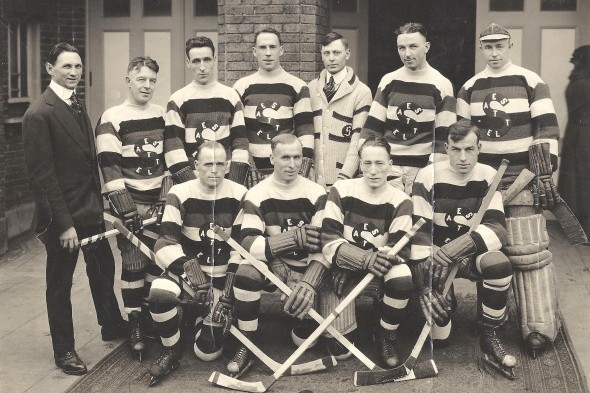
Tobin, third from left in the top row, with the Seattle Metropolitans.

			Regular season					Playoffs
Season	Team	League	GP	G	A	Pts	PIM	GP	G	A	Pts	PIM
1904–05	Edmonton Thistles	ASHL	1	0	–	0	0	–	–	–	–	–
1906–07	Winnipeg Shamrocks	WCAHA	1	3	0	3	2	–	–	–	–	–
1907–08	North Battleford	APHL	9	19	8	27	11	–	–	–	–	–
	Brandon Wheat Cities	MHL	1	0	0	0	0	–	–	–	–	–
1908–09	Winnipeg Shamrocks	MHL	1	1	0	1	0	–	–	–	–	–
1909–10	Winnipeg Hockey Club	WAHL	2	6	0	6	0	–	–	–	–	–
1910–11	Winnipeg Monarchs	WAHL	3	4	1	5	–	–	–	–	–	–
	Saskatoon Westerns	SPHL	6	9	0	9	–	–	–	–	–	–
	Prince Albert Mintos	SPHL	–	–	–	–	–	2	8	0	8	–
	Prince Albert Mintos	Stanley Cup	–	–	–	–	–	2	4	0	4	9
1911–12	Moose Jaw Brewers	SPHL	6	8	0	8	–	–	–	–	–	–
1912–13	New Westminster Royals	PCHA	13	11	3	14	20	–	–	–	–	–
1913–14	New Westminster Royals	PCHA	14	5	2	7	12	–	–	–	–	–
1914–15	Portland Rosebuds	PCHA	18	11	2	13	15	–	–	–	–	–
1915–16	Portland Rosebuds	PCHA	18	21	8	29	22	–	–	–	–	–
		Stanley Cup	–	–	–	–	–	5	2	1	3	12
1916–17	Portland Rosebuds	PCHA	24	15	7	22	45	–	–	–	–	–
1917–18	Portland Rosebuds	PCHA	18	13	3	16	0	–	–	–	–	–
1919	Victoria Aristocrats	PCHA	20	10	1	11	3	–	–	–	–	–
1919–20	Seattle Metropolitans	PCHA	19	10	4	14	3	2	0	0	0	0
		Stanley Cup	–	–	–	–	–	5	0	0	0	0
1920–21	Seattle Metropolitans		21	4	0	4	6	2	0	0	0	0
1921–22	Vancouver Millionaires		9	1	0	1	0	2	0	0	0	0
		Stanley Cup	–	–	–	–	–	5	0	0	0	0
PCHA totals			174	101	30	131	126	4	0	0	0	0
Stanley Cup totals			–	–	–	–	–	17	6	1	7	21
