= Stan Marples =

Canadian ice hockey player

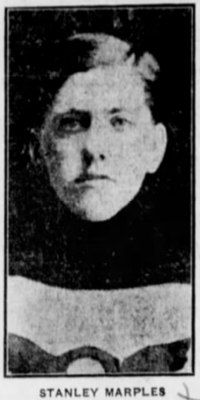
- Born: November 16, 1891 Winnipeg, Manitoba, Canada
- Died: January 27, 1928 (aged 36) Moose Jaw, Saskatchewan, Canada
- Height: 6 ft 1 in (185 cm)
- Weight: 170 lb (77 kg; 12 st 2 lb)
- Position: Left wing
- Played for: Portland Rosebuds; Victoria Aristocrats
- Playing career: 1912–1922

Stanley Gibson "Stan" Marples (November 16, 1891 – January 27, 1928) was a professional ice hockey left winger who played in various professional and amateur leagues, including the Pacific Coast Hockey Association. Amongst the teams he played with were the Portland Rosebuds and Victoria Aristocrats. Marples was also part of the 1915 Winnipeg Monarchs team which captured the Allan Cup as Canadian amateur champions by defeating the Melville Millionaires 4 goals to 2. He was the brother of Fred Marples, president of the Winnipeg Monarchs.

He died in Moose Jaw, Saskatchewan, where he lived in his last years, in 1928. He was buried at Moose Jaw after a funeral attended by the representatives from the Manitoba and Canadian Hockey Associations.
