= Alex Irvin =

Canadian ice hockey player

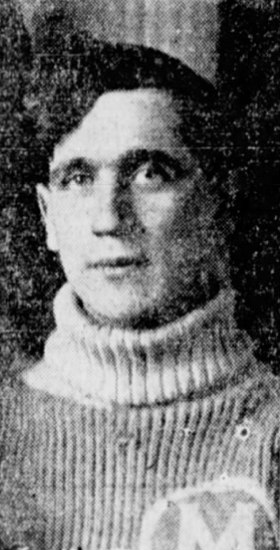
- Irvin with the Winnipeg Monarchs
- Born: April 5, 1890; Hamilton, Ontario, Canada
- Died: April 25, 1971 (aged 81)
- Position: Defence
- Played for: Vancouver Millionaires; Victoria Aristocrats
- Playing career: 1908–1919

Aleck Ellison "Alex" Irvin (April 5, 1890 – April 25, 1971) was a Canadian professional ice hockey player. He played with the Vancouver Millionaires and the Victoria Aristocrats of the Pacific Coast Hockey Association during the 1919 PCHA season.

Alex Irvin was an older brother of Hockey Hall of Fame member Dick Irvin, and although the brothers were both born in Hamilton, Ontario, they both came up through the hockey ranks in Winnipeg where they played for the Winnipeg Monarchs. On March 10, 1915 the Monarchs captured the Allan Cup as Canadian amateur champions by defeating the Melville Millionaires 4 goals to 2, with Alex Irvin captaining the team.
