= Tommy Murray (ice hockey) =

American-Canadian ice hockey player (1893–1963)

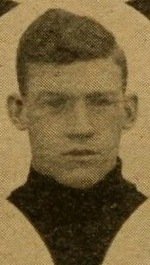
- Murray with the Portland Rosebuds in 1915–16.
- Born: February 17, 1893 Buffalo, New York
- Died: October 25, 1963 (aged 70) Fontana, California
- Height: 5 ft 7 in (170 cm)
- Weight: 175 lb (79 kg; 12 st 7 lb)
- Position: Goaltender
- Caught: Left
- Played for: Portland Rosebuds; Victoria Aristocrats; Vancouver Millionaires; Saskatoon Crescents
- Playing career: 1913–1930

Thomas Robinson Murray (February 17, 1893 in Buffalo, New York – October 25, 1963) was an American-Canadian professional ice hockey goaltender who played in various professional and amateur leagues, including the Western Canada Hockey League (WCHL) and Pacific Coast Hockey Association (PCHA).

== Career ==
Murray started his amateur career in Winnipeg, Manitoba with the Winnipeg Strathconas of the Manitoba Independent League, in 1912–13. Amongst the professional teams Murray played with were the Portland Rosebuds, Victoria Aristocrats, Vancouver Millionaires, and Saskatoon Crescents. In 1916 he played in the Stanley Cup finals with the Portland Rosebuds losing in five games to the Montreal Canadiens at the Montreal Arena.

Before going professional in the 1915–16 season Murray won the 1915 Allan Cup with the Winnipeg Monarchs as amateur champions of Canada.

After the 1922–23 season Murray was out of hockey for two years but moved back to the west coast where he had spent the majority of his professional career. For the 1925–26 season he joined the Los Angeles Richfields of the California Hockey League where number of old PCHA and WCHL players (such as Moose Johnson, Bernie Morris, Lloyd Cook and Smokey Harris) spent the twilight years of their hockey careers. Murray played for five years with the Los Angeles Richfields and retired in 1930.

=== 1933 Long Beach earthquake ===
On March 11, 1933, the Winnipeg Tribune published a story ('Tom Murray, hockey player, dies in quake') which claimed Murray was one of the fatally injured victims in the March 10, 1933 Long Beach earthquake south of downtown Los Angeles (which claimed between 115 and 120 lives). His name had however been confused with that of a Los Angeles garage employee named Tommy Murray, as he had escaped the earthquake without injuries.

Murray died in Fontana, California on October 25, 1963.

== Statistics ==
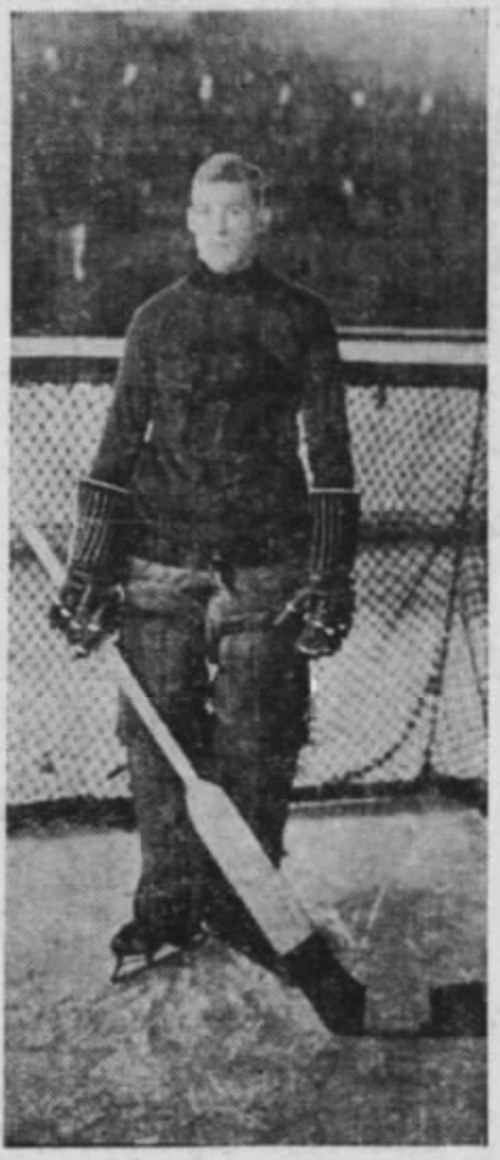
Murray with the Portland Rosebuds.

			Regular season								Playoffs
Season	Team	League	GP	W	L	T	Min	GA	SO	GAA	GP	W	L	T	Min	GA	SO	GAA
1912–13	Winnipeg Strathconas	MIHL	—	—	—	—	—	—	—	—	—	—	—	—	—	—	—	—
1913–14	Winnipeg Strathconas	MIHL	13	8	5	0	780	46	0	4.54	—	—	—	—	—	—	—	—
	Winnipeg Monarchs	WAHL	1	0	0	0	30	0	0	0.00	—	—	—	—	—	—	—	—
1914–15	Winnipeg Monarchs	WAHL	7	5	2	0	420	37	0	6.17	2	2	0	0	—	14	0	7.00
		Allan Cup	—	—	—	—	—	—	—	—	6	4	2	0	–	24	0	4.00
1915–16	Portland Rosebuds	PCHA	18	13	5	0	1092	50	2	2.75	—	—	—	—	—	—	—	—
		Stanley Cup	—	—	—	—	—	—	—	—	5	2	3	0	300	15	1	3.00
1916–17	Portland Rosebuds	PCHA	24	9	15	0	1464	112	0	4.59	—	—	—	—	—	—	—	—
1917–18	Portland Rosebuds	PCHA	18	7	11	0	1132	75	0	3.98	—	—	—	—	—	—	—	—
1918–19	Victoria Aristocrats	PCHA	20	7	13	0	1252	81	2	3.88	—	—	—	—	—	—	—	—
1919–20	Did not play
1920–21	Did not play
1921–22	Vancouver Millionaires	PCHA	2	0	2	0	120	6	0	3.00	—	—	—	—	—	—	—	—
1922–23	Saskatoon Crescents	WCHL	12	4	8	0	664	46	1	4.16	—	—	—	—	—	—	—	—
1923–24	Did not play
1924–25	Did not play
1925–26	Los Angeles Richfields	Cal-Pro	—	—	—	—	—	—	—	—	—	—	—	—	—	—	—	—
1926–27	Los Angeles Richfields	Cal-Pro	—	—	—	—	—	—	—	—	—	—	—	—	—	—	—	—
1927–28	Los Angeles Richfields	Cal-Pro	21	13	5	3	—	44	—	2.10	5	0	3	2	300	12	0	2.40
1928–29	Los Angeles Richfields	Cal-Pro	23	—	—	—	—	30	—	1.30	—	—	—	—	—	—	—	—
1929–30	Los Angeles Richfields	Cal-Pro	17	—	—	—	—	—	—	—	—	—	—	—	—	—	—	—
