= Del Irvine =

Canadian ice hockey player

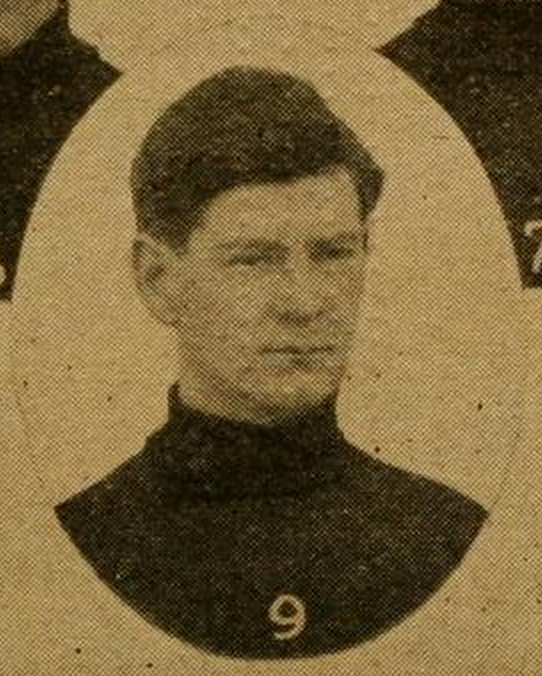
- Born: November 24, 1892 Barrie, Ontario, Canada
- Died: April 13, 1916 (aged 23) Chicago, Illinois, U.S.
- Height: 5 ft 11 in (180 cm)
- Weight: 160 lb (73 kg; 11 st 6 lb)
- Position: Defence
- Shot: Left
- Played for: Portland Rosebuds
- Playing career: 1912–1916

Delmar Edwards Irvine (November 24, 1892 – April 13, 1916) was a Canadian professional ice hockey player. He played professionally for the Portland Rosebuds of the Pacific Coast Hockey Association (PCHA) and was a member of the 1916 PCHA champions. He died after his one professional season of pneumonia, attributed to playing hockey indoors all winter, and inhaling chloride, which was used to artificially freeze the ice at the time.

== Playing career ==
Born in Barrie, Ontario, Irvine played senior hockey for the Winnipeg Monarchs and won the 1915 Allan Cup championship with the club. He received professional offers and joined the Portland Rosebuds. The Rosebuds won the PCHA championship, and came east to play the Montreal Canadiens for the Stanley Cup in the 1916 Stanley Cup Final. The Rosebuds lost the series three games to two. After the Cup series, the Rosebuds and Canadiens played exhibition games in New York and Cleveland. It was in Cleveland that it was discovered that Irvine had pneumonia. Irvine did not play in the Cleveland games and was on his way home to Winnipeg when he entered hospital in Chicago where he died.
