= Dick Irvin =

Canadian ice hockey player and coach (1892–1957)

- Hockey Hall of Fame, 1958
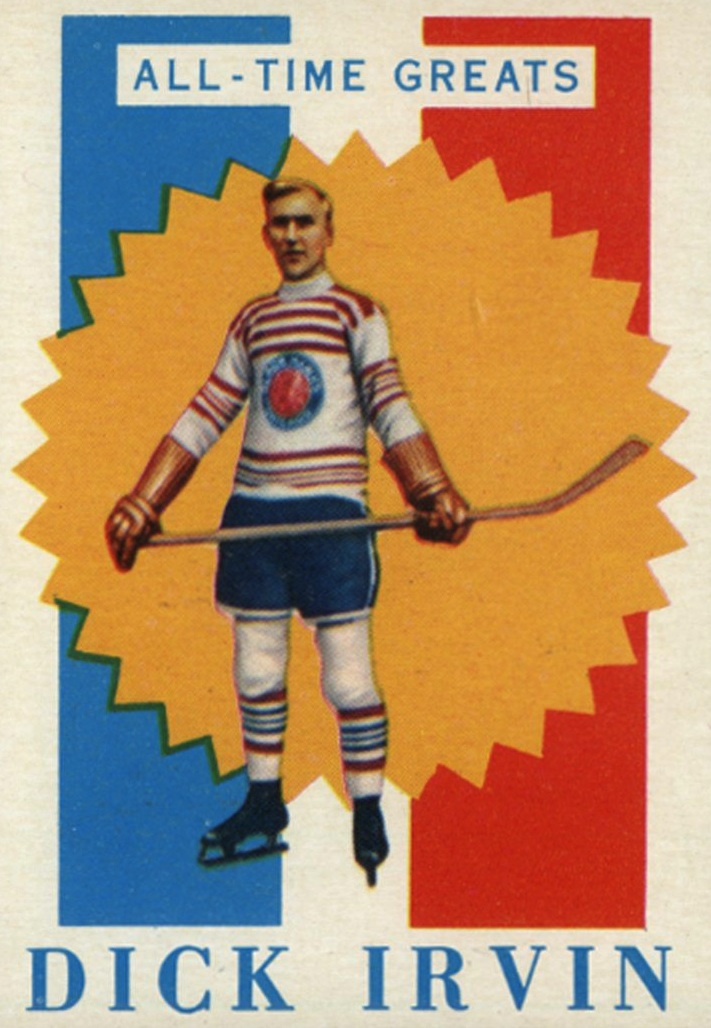
- Irvin on a 1960 Topps card
- Born: July 19, 1892 Hamilton, Ontario, Canada
- Died: May 16, 1957 (aged 64) Montreal, Quebec, Canada
- Height: 5 ft 9 in (175 cm)
- Weight: 162 lb (73 kg; 11 st 8 lb)
- Position: Centre
- Shot: Left
- Played for: Portland Rosebuds; Regina Capitals; Chicago Black Hawks
- Playing career: 1916–1929

James Dickinson "Dick" Irvin Jr. (or II) (July 19, 1892 – May 16, 1957) was a Canadian professional ice hockey player and coach. He played for professional teams in the Pacific Coast Hockey Association, the Western Canada Hockey League, and the National Hockey League (NHL) from 1916 to 1928, when he had to retire from repeated injuries. Irvin was one of the greatest players of his day, balancing a torrid slap shot and tough style with gentlemanly play. For his playing career, Irvin was named to the Hockey Hall of Fame in 1958. After playing, Irvin built a successful career as a coach in the NHL with the Chicago Black Hawks, Toronto Maple Leafs, and Montreal Canadiens. He coached his teams to the Stanley Cup Finals 16 times in 26 years as a full-time head coach, winning one Stanley Cup coaching Toronto and three coaching Montreal, finishing with over 600 wins as a coach. (Note: Irvin was a player for the bottom-dwelling 1928–29 Chicago Black Hawks when, late in the season, coach Herb Gardiner was fired and Irvin filled in as player-coach for the final 12 games. He retired before the 1929–30 season and later returned as head coach for the 1930–31 Chicago Black Hawks season) He also served in the Canadian Expeditionary Force during the First World War.

== Early life ==
Irvin was born in Hamilton, Ontario, one of 10 children, six boys and four girls. Two of the boys died in infancy, and the four girls all died of tuberculosis at an early age. His father James Dickinson Irvin Sr. was a butcher. The family moved to Winnipeg, Manitoba, when Dick Jr. was eight.

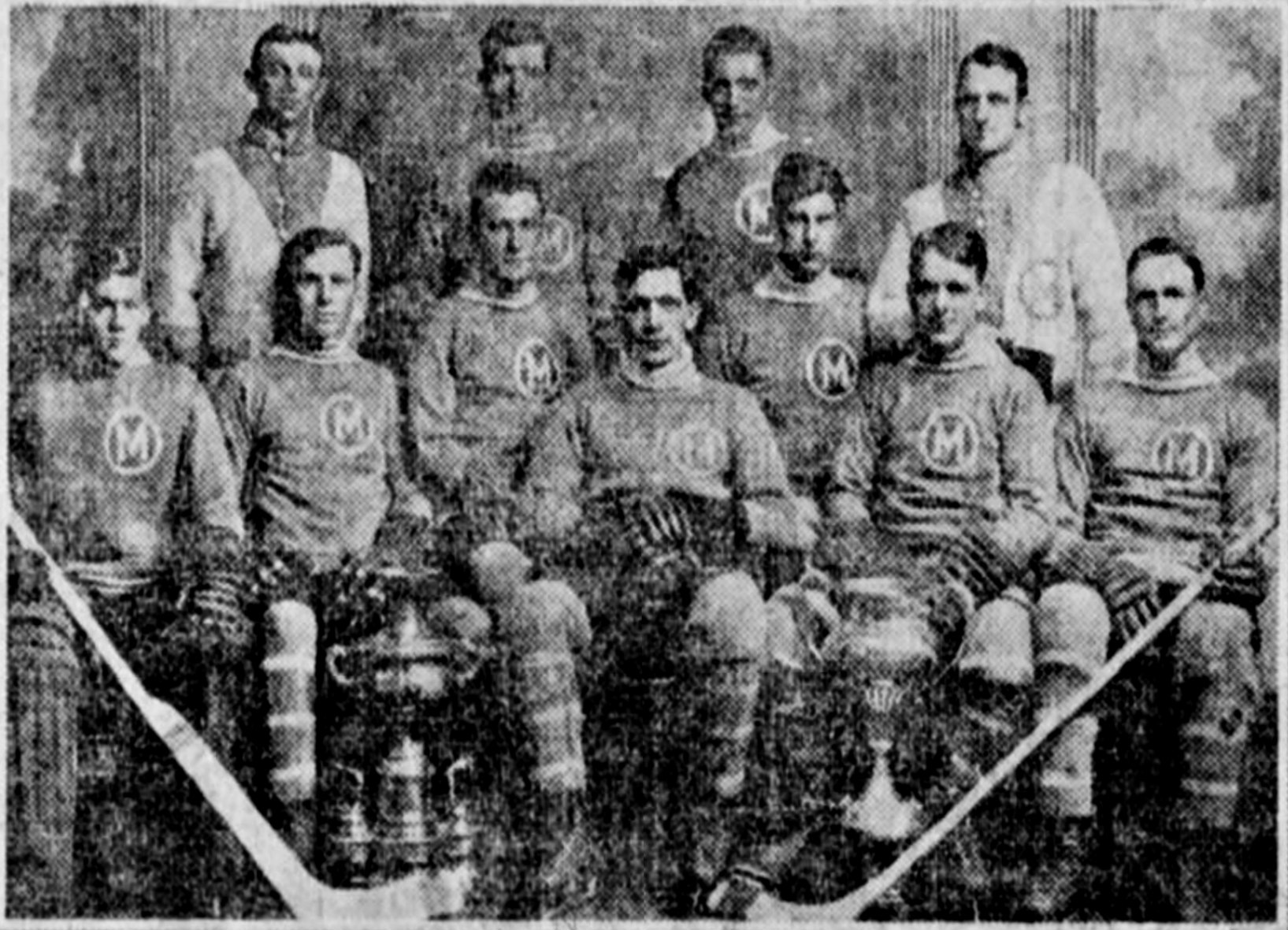
Winnipeg Monarchs with the Allan Cup in 1915. Dick Irvin in the back row second from left.

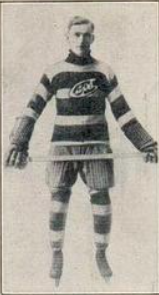
1924-26 Paulin Chambers card of Irvin of Regina Capitals

Irvin played hockey from an early age, following in the footsteps of his oldest brother Alex. Their father would drive his sons and other boys to games by horse and sleigh, relying often upon the horses' sense of direction in winter blizzards to return home safely. The family flooded the driveway of their home to create an ice rink which the Irvin sons would play on. Irvin also set up a shooting area in the attic of the home, where he would shoot a puck at the doorknob of an old door mounted sideways against a wall.

Irvin first played senior hockey with the Winnipeg Strathconas at the early age of 12. The Strathconas were reserve team to support the Winnipeg Monarchs. During the 1914 Allan Cup, Irvin was ruled ineligible to compete for the Monarchs. Team president Fred Marples declared that the Monarchs refused to defend the cup without Irvin. After three days of negotiating, the Monarchs agreed to play without Irvin in a one-game Allan Cup challenge versus the Kenora Thistles, instead of the customary two-game series decided on total goals scored. The Canadian Amateur Hockey Association was established later in 1914, which determined player eligibility for the Allan Cup. Irvin was declared eligible for the Monarchs and won the 1915 Allan Cup after the team had defeated the Melville Millionaires over two games 7 goals to 6 (3-4, 4-2). There were no further challenges, and Irvin and the Monarchs ended the season as Allan Cup champions.

Irvin was also considered a top baseball player and he played on the Winnipeg Dominion Express team with his brothers Alex and George. Irvin was also a competitive curler.

== Career ==
Irvin began his professional career in 1916 with the Portland Rosebuds of the Pacific Coast Hockey Association and was the fourth leading scoring rookie tallying 35 goals. Before the following season, the Canadian government instituted a draft in August 1917 and Irvin was conscripted into the Canadian Expeditionary Force in November 1917. Irvin was taken on by The Fort Garry Horse regiment in April 1918 and arrived in England in May 1918. He was transferred to France in August 1918 and in October was transferred to a signals unit as a motorcycle rider. The war ended in November 1918 and Irvin arrived back in Halifax in May 1919.

Irvin was reinstated as an amateur and he played three seasons with the Regina Victorias senior club. He returned to professional hockey in 1921 with the Regina Capitals of the Western Canada Hockey League. In 1926, at age 34, he entered the National Hockey League (NHL), signed by the newly formed Chicago Black Hawks. Irvin was made the team's first captain, and had an impressive campaign, finishing second in the league in scoring. In their first season, the Black Hawks led all NHL teams in scoring, led by Irvin and Babe Dye. Irvin's second season turned to tragedy as he fractured his skull, which led to retirement after the 1928–29 season, during which he had also added coaching duties. The Hawks had finished with the worst record in the NHL in both of his last two seasons as a player.

Irvin was hired as head coach of the Black Hawks in 1930, and in his first season behind the bench led the team to 24 wins, 17 losses and 3 ties. The Black Hawks made it to the Stanley Cup Finals but lost and the Black Hawks released him in September 1931. That November, the Toronto Maple Leafs were winless after five games and manager Conn Smythe convinced Irvin to coach the Leafs. In his first season coaching the Leafs (the first in the brand-new Maple Leaf Gardens), he achieved immediate success by winning the Stanley Cup. Irvin would lead the Leafs to the finals six more times, but could not deliver another Cup to Toronto.

By the end of the 1939–40 season, which ended with yet another loss in the finals, Smythe believed that Irvin had taken the Leafs as far as he could and decided to replace him with former Leafs captain Hap Day, who had spent two years as a referee after retiring as a player in 1938. Smythe also knew that he would be away in the war and felt that Irvin would not be able to hold on without Smythe to back him up.

Meanwhile, the Montreal Canadiens had just suffered a ten-win season (still the worst winning percentage in franchise history), and were looking for a new coach. Knowing that the Canadiens were in serious straits off the ice as well as on it, Smythe suggested that the Canadiens hire Irvin, solving both teams' issues. Although Smythe knew he was giving the Leafs' biggest rival a boost, he also knew that three teams had already shut down during the Depression and a fourth was on life support. He didn't want the Canadiens to fold as well. Canadiens general manager Tommy Gorman took up Smythe on his suggestion and drove Irvin to Montreal to take over as coach.

Irvin didn't take long to turn the Canadiens around. He had them back in the playoffs in his first season. During his third season, he and players from the Canadiens were featured in the instructional film Hockey Fundamentals, produced by the Quebec Amateur Hockey Association to benefit local minor ice hockey players. In his fourth season, Irvin took them all the way to the Stanley Cup—the first of six finals appearances and three Cups in 15 years. Helped by star players Elmer Lach, Doug Harvey, goalie Bill Durnan and a young Maurice Richard, the Canadiens were just beginning to blossom as an NHL dynasty. Although Irvin found his greatest success in Montreal, he came under fire during the 1954-55 season for encouraging "goon" tactics, especially after Montreal fans rioted in protest of Richard's season-ending suspension for attacking a referee. He was already well known for looking the other way when stick-swinging duels broke out in practices. Although they made it to the 1955 Cup Finals (losing to the Detroit Red Wings), internal pressure forced Irvin to step down.

He returned to the Black Hawks as head coach for the 1955–56 season, taking the reins of a moribund team that had only made the playoffs once in the past 10 years and finished last in the past two seasons. Irvin was unable to turn the team's fortunes around, and the Black Hawks again ended the year in last place, despite the emergence of Ed Litzenberger as a scoring star. Irvin was to coach the Black Hawks again in 1956–57, but he became so ill with bone cancer that he had to retire before the season began. He died a few months later at age 64 in Montreal.

A year later, Irvin was elected into the Hockey Hall of Fame. His coaching career included four Stanley Cups with 692 regular season wins, the most in league history at the time until Scotty Bowman passed him. Among the seven coaches with four Stanley Cup championships, only Al Arbour and Bowman have more wins than Irvin.

== Playing style ==
"He is playing centre, and playing it so spectacularly that he is touted the real find of the season. He plays clean hockey, too, and has a most deceptive method of wig-wagging his way through the best defences for a shot on the nets. Generally, his shots are billed through to the goal, as any of a trio of league goaltenders can substantiate."

— Edmonton Journal on Irvin during his 1916–17 season with the Portland Rosebuds.

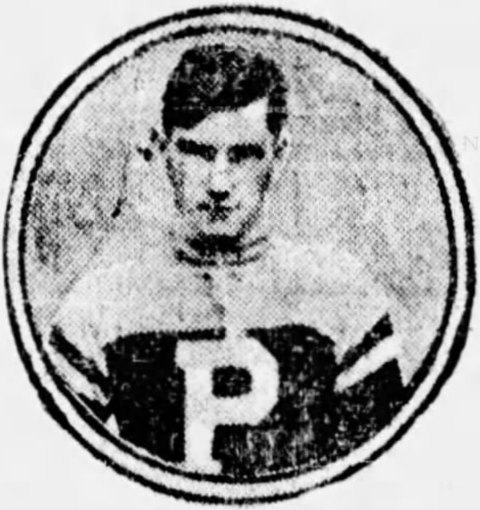
Irvin with the Portland Rosebuds in 1916–17.

When PCHA president Frank Patrick signed Irvin to his league for the 1916–17 season, to play with the Portland Rosebuds, he claimed the 23-year old former Winnipeg amateur centre ice man was "the greatest forward who ever came into the Pacific Coast League" and predicted that before the end of the season Irvin would be "one of the best players in the country." Patrick hailed Irvin as a "natural-born goal getter" who "scores from almost any possible angle."

After a slow start in Portland, where Irvin himself was convinced that he was not to be given a chance to properly display his worth as a player, later on confessing that he had had early thoughts on leaving the league and returning home to Winnipeg, he was finally injected into a game in Portland and made good with a vengeance. At the end of the season he had lived up to Frank Patrick's high expectations and he almost caught up with the top point producers in the league, finally finishing 4th in goals and 5th in points despite his slow start to the season where he sat on the bench for most of the first five games.

Irvin did not touch either alcohol or nicotine, figuring perfect health would be one of his best assets.

== Personal ==
Irvin kept a home in Regina, Saskatchewan, for most of his life, before buying a home in Mount Royal in 1954. Irvin married Bertha Helen Bain and fathered two children, daughter Fay and son James Dickinson Irvin III (known as Dick Irvin Jr.) – a noted Canadian television sports announcer. He was a noted pigeon fancier. Irvin died at his Mount Royal home. According to his obituary in the Montreal Gazette, Irvin "died after a lingering illness. [He] had to retire because of the illness that was finally to snuff out his colorful life." He was interred in Mount Pleasant Cemetery, Toronto.

Irvin was portrayed in the 2005 Maurice Richard biopic The Rocket by Canadian actor Stephen McHattie.

== Tribute ==
Upon learning of Irvin's death, NHL president Clarence Campbell issued this statement which appeared in the Montreal Gazette on May 17, 1957: "Everyone in the hockey world mourns. [We have lost] one of the greatest figures the game has ever known."

== Career statistics ==
=== Regular season and playoffs ===
			Regular season					Playoffs
Season	Team	League	GP	G	A	Pts	PIM	GP	G	A	Pts	PIM
1911–12	Winnipeg Monarchs	MHL	5	16	0	16	0	1	5	0	5	0
1912–13	Winnipeg Strathconas	MHL	7	32	0	32	12	1	0	0	0	0
1912–13	Winnipeg Monarchs	MHL	2	5	0	5	—	—	—	—	—	—
1913–14	Winnipeg Strathconas	MHL	3	11	0	11	—	—	—	—	—	—
1913–14	Winnipeg Monarchs	MHL	7	23	1	24	—	—	—	—	—	—
1914–15	Winnipeg Monarchs	MHL	6	23	3	26	30	2	10	0	10	2
1914–15	Winnipeg Monarchs	Al-Cup	—	—	—	—	—	6	17	3	20	20
1915–16	Winnipeg Monarchs	MHL	8	17	4	21	38	2	7	1	8	2
1916–17	Portland Rosebuds	PCHA	23	35	10	45	24	—	—	—	—	—
1917–18	Winnipeg Ypres	MHL	9	29	8	37	26	—	—	—	—	—
1919–20	Regina Victorias	SSHL	12	32	4	36	22	2	1	0	1	4
1920–21	Regina Victorias	SSHL	11	19	5	24	12	4	8	0	8	4
1921–22	Regina Capitals	WCHL	20	21	7	28	17	4	3	0	3	2
1921–22	Regina Capitals	West-P	—	—	—	—	—	2	1	0	1	0
1922–23	Regina Capitals	WCHL	25	9	4	13	12	2	1	0	1	0
1923–24	Regina Capitals	WCHL	29	15	8	23	33	2	0	0	0	4
1924–25	Regina Capitals	WCHL	28	13	5	18	38	—	—	—	—	—
1925–26	Portland Rosebuds	WHL	30	31	5	36	29	—	—	—	—	—
1926–27	Chicago Black Hawks	NHL	43	18	18	36	34	2	2	0	2	4
1927–28	Chicago Black Hawks	NHL	12	5	4	9	14	—	—	—	—	—
1928–29	Chicago Black Hawks	NHL	39	6	1	7	30	—	—	—	—	—
WCHL/WHL totals			102	58	24	82	100	8	4	0	4	6
NHL totals			94	29	23	52	78	2	2	0	2	4

== Coaching record ==
Team	Year	Regular season						Postseason (Note: Irvin participated in 190 total playoff games, as two games ended in ties (until 1935, the NHL's first round was decided by total goals.)			
Team	Year	G	W	L	T	Pts	Finish	W	L	Win%	Result
CHI	1928–29	12	2	6	4	22	5th in American	—	—	—	Missed playoffs
CHI	1930–31	44	24	17	3	51	2nd in American	5	3	.625	Lost in Stanley Cup Final (MON)
TOR	1931–32	43	23	15	5	53	2nd in Canadian	5	1	.833	Won Stanley Cup (NYR)
TOR	1932–33	48	24	18	6	54	1st in Canadian	4	5	.444	Lost in Stanley Cup Final (NYR)
TOR	1933–34	48	26	13	9	61	1st in Canadian	2	3	.400	Lost in semifinals (DET)
TOR	1934–35	48	30	14	4	64	1st in Canadian	3	4	.429	Lost in Stanley Cup Final (MTM)
TOR	1935–36	48	23	19	6	52	2nd in Canadian	4	5	.444	Lost in Stanley Cup Final (DET)
TOR	1936–37	48	22	21	5	49	3rd in Canadian	0	2	.000	Lost in quarterfinals (NYR)
TOR	1937–38	48	24	15	9	57	1st in Canadian	4	3	.571	Lost in Stanley Cup Final (CHI)
TOR	1938–39	48	19	20	9	47	3rd in NHL	5	5	.500	Lost in Stanley Cup Final (BOS)
TOR	1939–40	48	25	17	6	56	3rd in NHL	6	4	.600	Lost in Stanley Cup Final (NYR)
TOR total		427	216	152	59			33	32	.508	9 playoff appearances 1 Stanley Cup
MON	1940–41	48	16	26	6	38	6th in NHL	1	2	.333	Lost in quarterfinals (CHI)
MON	1941–42	48	18	27	3	39	6th in NHL	1	2	.333	Lost in quarterfinals (DET)
MON	1942–43	50	19	19	12	50	4th in NHL	1	4	.200	Lost in semifinals (BOS)
MON	1943–44	50	38	5	7	83	1st in NHL	8	1	.889	Won Stanley Cup (CHI)
MON	1944–45	50	38	8	4	80	1st in NHL	2	4	.333	Lost in semifinals (TOR)
MON	1945–46	50	28	17	5	61	1st in NHL	8	1	.889	Won Stanley Cup (BOS)
MON	1946–47	60	34	16	10	78	1st in NHL	6	5	.545	Lost in Stanley Cup Final (TOR)
MON	1947–48	60	20	29	11	51	5th in NHL	—	—	—	Did not qualify
MON	1948–49	60	28	23	9	65	3rd in NHL	3	4	.429	Lost in semifinals (DET)
MON	1949–50	70	29	22	19	77	2nd in NHL	1	4	.200	Lost in semifinals (NYR)
MON	1950–51	70	25	30	15	65	3rd in NHL	5	6	.455	Lost in Stanley Cup Final (TOR)
MON	1951–52	70	34	26	10	78	2nd in NHL	4	7	.364	Lost in Stanley Cup Final (DET)
MON	1952–53	70	28	23	19	75	2nd in NHL	8	4	.667	Won Stanley Cup (BOS)
MON	1953–54	70	35	24	11	81	2nd in NHL	7	4	.636	Lost in Stanley Cup Final (DET)
MON	1954–55	70	41	18	11	93	2nd in NHL	7	5	.583	Lost in Stanley Cup Final (DET)
MON total		896	431	313	152			62	53	.539	14 playoff appearances 3 Stanley Cups
CHI	1955–56	70	19	39	12	50	6th in NHL	—	—	—	Did not qualify
CHI total		126	45	62	19			5	3	.625	1 playoff appearance
Total		1449	692	527	230	1612	—	100	88	.532	24 playoff appearances, 4 Stanley Cups

== Awards and achievements ==
- Allan Cup Championship (1915)
- Stanley Cup Championships as a coach (1932 – Toronto, 1944, 1946, and 1953 – Montreal)
- Lost in the finals a record 12 times as a coach (1931 – Chicago, 1933-35-36-38-39-40 – Toronto, 1947-51-52-54-55 – Montreal)
- NHL First All-Star Team Coach (1944, 1945, 1946)
- NHL Second All-Star Team Coach (1931, 1932, 1933, 1934, 1935, 1941)
- Inducted into the Manitoba Sports Hall of Fame and Museum in 1983
- Selected to Manitoba's All-Century First All-Star Team and named Coach of the Century
- Honoured Member of the Manitoba Hockey Hall of Fame

== See also ==
- Notable families in the NHL
- List of members of the Hockey Hall of Fame
- List of National Hockey League head coaching wins and point percentage leaders

== Bibliography ==
- Goyens, Chrys; Turowetz, Allan (1986). Lions in Winter. Scarborough, ON: Prentice-Hall Canada. ISBN 0-13-537457-X.
- Hunter, Douglas (1996). War Games: Conn Smythe and hockey's fighting men. Toronto, Ontario: Penguin Books. ISBN 0-14-025685-7.
- Hunter, Douglas (1997). Champions: The Illustrated History of Hockey's Greatest Dynasties. Chicago, Illinois: Triumph Books. ISBN 1-57243-213-6.
- MacLeod, Alan Livingstone (2018), From Rinks to Regiments: Hockey Hall-of-Famers and the Great War, Victoria, British Columbia: Heritage House, ISBN 978-1-77203-268-0
- Smythe, Conn; Young, Scott (1981). Conn Smythe: If you can't beat 'em in the alley. Toronto, Ontario: McClelland and Stewart. ISBN 0-7710-9078-1.

Preceded by new creation	Chicago Black Hawks captain 1926–29	Succeeded by L. S. Dutkowski
Preceded by Herb Gardiner	Head coach of the Chicago Black Hawks; 1928	Succeeded by Tom Shaughnessy
Preceded by Bill Tobin	Head coach of the Chicago Black Hawks; 1930–1931	Succeeded by Bill Tobin
Preceded by Art Duncan	Head coach of the Toronto Maple Leafs; 1931–1940	Succeeded by Hap Day
Preceded by Pit Lepine	Head coach of the Montreal Canadiens; 1940–1955	Succeeded by Toe Blake
Preceded by Frank Eddolls	Head coach of the Chicago Black Hawks; 1955–56	Succeeded by Tommy Ivan
