= William Northey (ice hockey) =

Canadian ice hockey executive

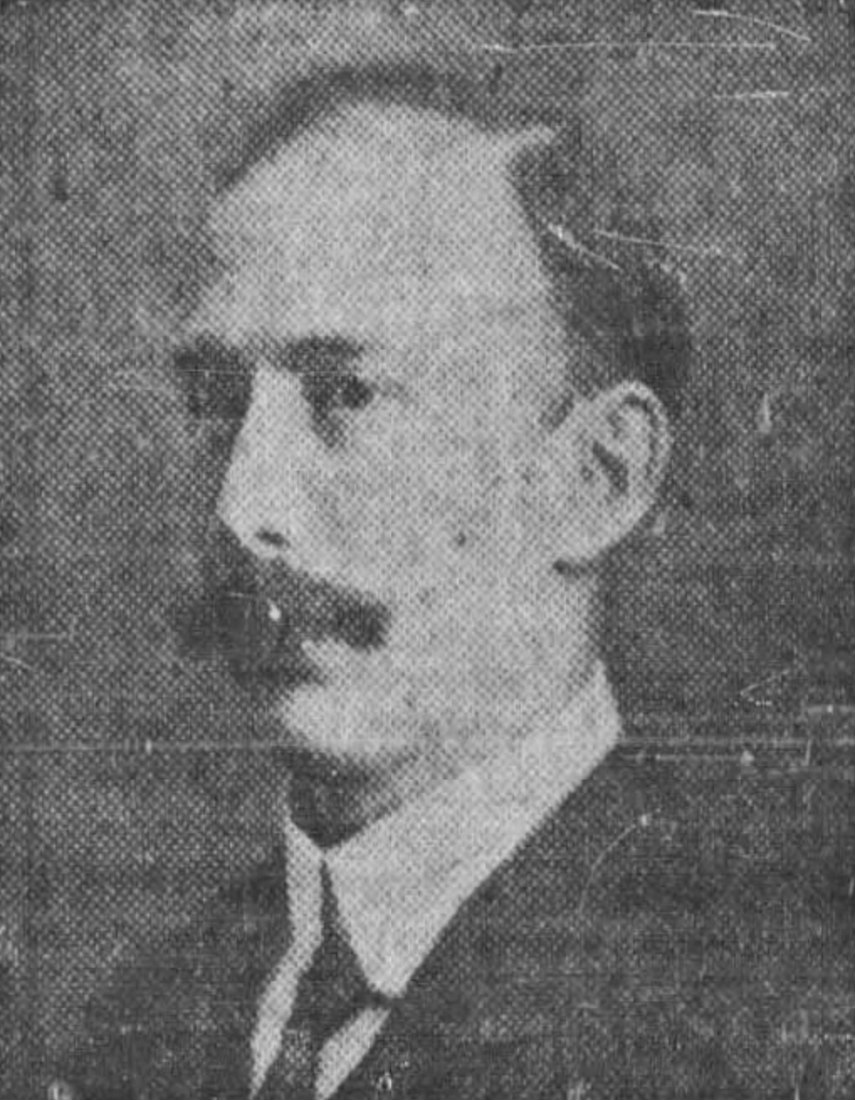
- Northey c. 1911
- Born: William Mitchell Northey; April 29, 1872; Leeds, Quebec, Canada
- Died: August 9, 1963 (aged 91)
- Known for: Ice hockey executive

William Mitchell Northey (April 29, 1872 – August 9, 1963), was an executive in the National Hockey League.

== Hockey career ==
Born in Leeds, Quebec, Northey became secretary at the Montreal Hockey Club in 1893. He would help lead the team to two Stanley Cups. In 1909, he helped convince ice hockey executives to change two rules still in place today. The first was the change from a game consisting of two 30-minute halves to three 20-minute periods. He was also instrumental in the decision to discontinue the rover position. The number of players on the ice per team was dropped to six.

Northey formed the Canadian Arena Company and was instrumental in building Arena Gardens in Toronto, and owned Montreal Arena, which burned down in 1918. In 1924, Northey helped construct the famous Montreal Forum. From 1947 to 1956 he served as vice president with Montreal. He spent the 1956–57 season as President of the Montreal Canadiens. The Canadiens were sold to the Molson Family in the summer of 1957, and Northey retired from hockey. His name was engraved on the Stanley Cup three times in 1953, 1956, and 1957.

Northey was inducted into the Hockey Hall of Fame in 1947.

== Personal life ==
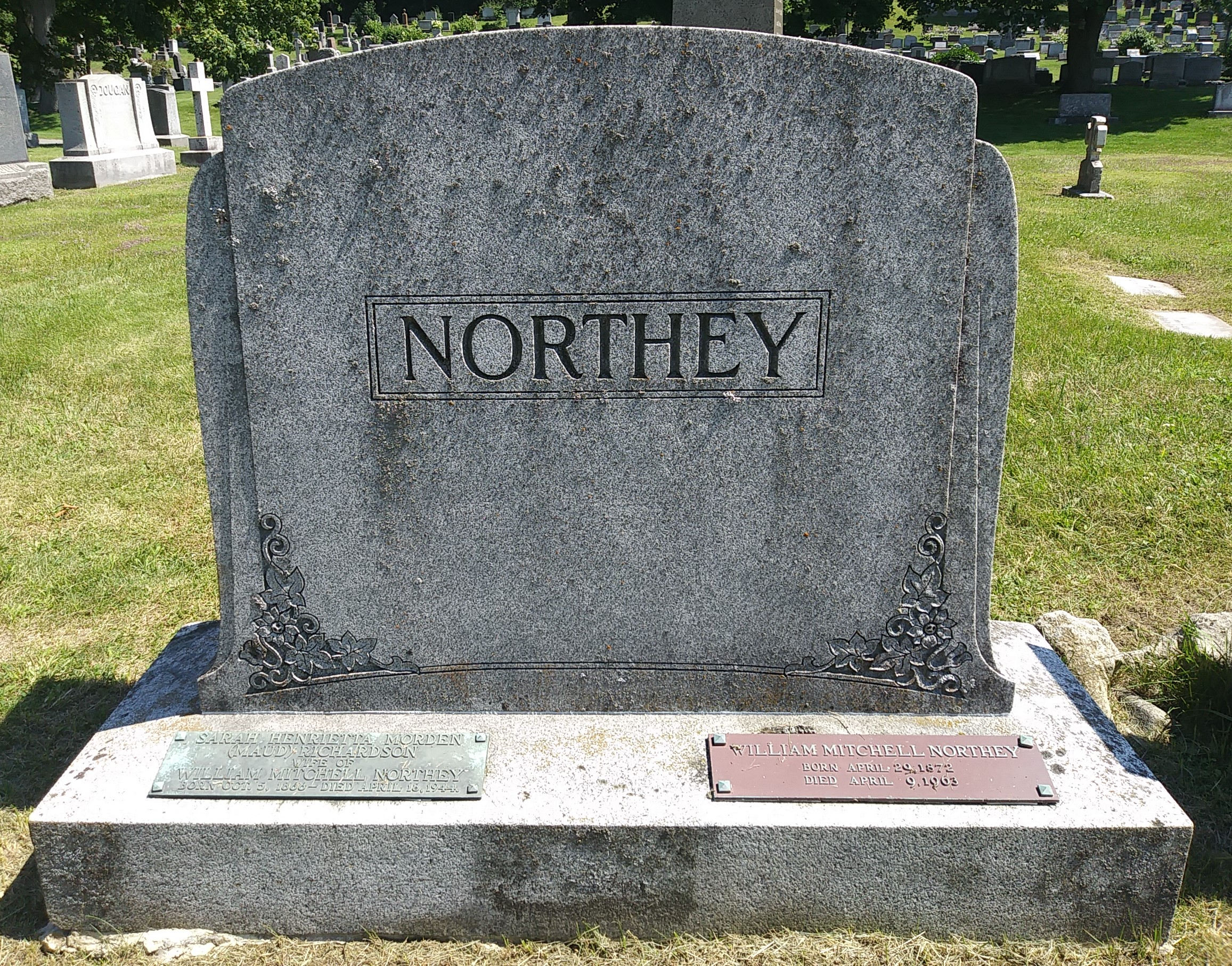
Northey's grave site in Mount Royal Cemetery, Montreal

On November 25, 1922, Northey survived a serious traffic accident near Oakville, Ontario when three touring cars collided on the Hamilton highway, killing one man.

Outside of ice hockey, Northey was also involved in horse racing as a secretary-treasurer with the Jockey Club of Montreal.
