= 1914 Allan Cup =

Canadian senior ice hockey championship

The Allan Cup trophy

The 1914 Allan Cup was the Canadian senior ice hockey championship for the 1913–14 season. The final challenge was hosted by the Regina Victorias in Regina, Saskatchewan. The 1914 playoff marked the seventh time the Allan Cup had a champion.

By 1914, the numerous challenges for the trophy by league champions across Canada were difficult to manage. Cup trustees Claude C. Robinson and William Northey worked together to schedule challenges, and decided that the defending champions would play a maximum of three challenges for the trophy per season. Following difficulties encountered in 1914, Robinson suggested establishing a national body for governing hockey, which became the Canadian Amateur Hockey Association.

== Winnipeg Hockey League ==
The defending 1913 Allan Cup champions, Winnipeg Hockey Club, failed to win the Winnipeg Amateur Hockey League. With a 6-2-0 record, the Winnipeg Monarchs were given the opportunity to defend the Allan Cup on behalf of the league. The Monarchs were led by team president Fred Marples, who resurrected the Winnipeg Strathconas senior team and entered them into the Independent Amateur Hockey League for the 1913–season. He felt it necessary to give the younger players more opportunities to practice and play in order to develop talent, secured more ice time and operated the Strathconas as a reserve team to support the Monarchs.

== First challenge ==
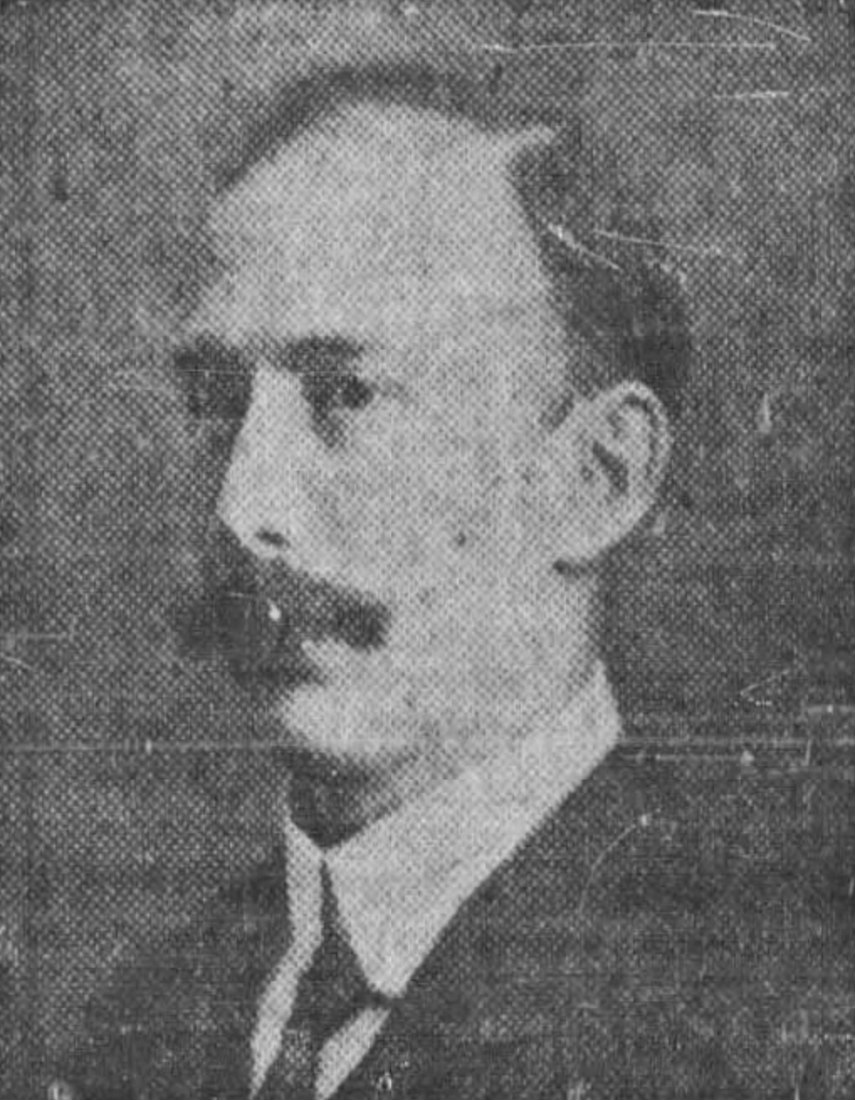
William Northey

The Winnipeg Amateur Hockey League debated whether or not players from the Strathconas were in a lower level of hockey and eligible to be a reserve player. Trustees for the Allan Cup also struggled to determine player eligibility since there was no authoritative national body to classify leagues by the level of play. When Allan Cup trustee William Northey ruled that Dick Irvin of the Strathconas was ineligible to compete, the Monarchs refused to defend the Allan Cup. Marples considered the Strathconas to be a reserve team for the Monarchs and that the decision was unfair to his team. After three days of negotiating, the Monarchs agreed to play without Irvin in a one-game Allan Cup challenge versus the Kenora Thistles, instead of the customary two-game series decided on total goals scored. The Monarchs won by a 6–2 score versus the Kenora Thistles.

== Second challenge ==
The Winnipeg Monarchs received a challenge from the Regina Victorias, Saskatchewan champions. Played in Winnipeg, Manitoba.

Player eligibility was again questioned. The Monarchs sought a ruling about a player from the Victorias, who was reported to have played one game for a team in Melville, Saskatchewan, and possibly with other senior teams. Robinson investigated and sent his findings to Northey. Cup trustees ruled the player eligible, since the other league in which he played was not known to be senior level.

- Winnipeg Monarchs (Allan Cup holder)
- Regina Victorias (Challenger)

=== Results ===
Regina Victorias 5 - Winnipeg Monarchs 4

Regina Victorias capture the Allan Cup.

== Third challenge ==
Regina Victorias received a challenge from Grand-Mère, Quebec champions. Played in Regina, Saskatchewan.

- Regina Victorias (Allan Cup holder)
- Grand-Mère (Challenger)

=== Results ===
Regina Victorias 6 - Grand-Mere 4
Regina Victorias 4 - Grand-Mere 1

Regina Victorias carries the Allan Cup, winning the series 10-goals-to-5. With no more challengers accepted in time to play, the Victorias win the 1914 Allan Cup.
