= Regina Victorias =

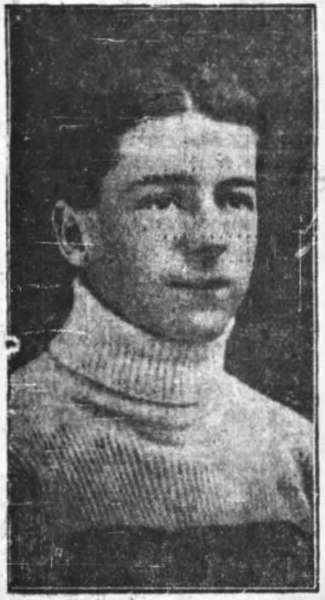
Regina Victorias player Fred Wilson, Allan Cup champion with the Victorias in 1914.

The Regina Victorias (often shortened to Vics) were two ice hockey teams, one at the senior level (1914–1938) and one at the junior level (1917–1921), based in Regina, Saskatchewan. The senior Vics played in the Allan Cup finals three times, winning the Allan Cup in their first (1914) appearance. The senior Victorias were six-time winners of the Saskatchewan Senior Championship, while the junior Victorias were two-time winners of the Saskatchewan Junior championship.

== Senior team ==
The Victorias competed in the Saskatchewan Senior Hockey League (SSHL). They were SSHL champions in their first season, 1913–14, going on to win that year's Allan Cup as national champions. The Vics won their second SSHL championship two season later, but lost the challenge for the 1915–16 Allan Cup. The Victorias took a break in 1917–18 because of World War I.

After the war they won the SSHL Championship in 1918–19, 1920–21, 1921–22, 1924–25, 1925–26, and 1928–29. They only managed to make the Allan Cup final once – in 1921–22.

Their fortunes went steadily downhill. The Victorias faced on-ice and box office competition in their own city from the Regina Aces. The Victorias and Aces amalgamated into the same team as of the 1939–40 season, with the Aces' Al Pickard as team president and Victorias' coach Duke Dutkowski behind the bench.

=== Saskatchewan Senior Hockey League (1914–1938) results ===
GF = Goals for, GA = Goals against

Season	Games	Won	Lost	Tied	Points	GF	GA	Standing	Playoffs	
1913–14	16	12	4	0	24	–	–	1st South	Won Group, Won Sask, Won Allan Cup	
1914–15	12	8	4	0	16	–	–	2nd South	out of playoffs	
1915–16	16	11	4	1	23	–	–	1st South	Won Sask, Lost Allan Cup	
1916–17	10	8	2	0	16	62	16	2nd	        out of playoffs		
1918–19	8	5	3	0	10	–	–	1st South	Won Sask, No Allan Cup Challenge	
1919–20	12	9	3	0	18	74	31	Tied 1st	Lost Final	
1920–21	16	10	6	0	20	–	–	Tied 1st	Won Sask, No Allan Cup Challenge	
1921–22	5	3	2	0	6	25	13	1st	        Won West, Lost Allan Cup	
1922–23	11	7	4	0	14	48	44	2nd	        out of playoffs	
1923–24	6	5	0	1	11	27	8	1st South	Lost Sask	
1924–25	9	8	1	0	16	–	–	1st South	Won Sask, Lost West Semi Final	
1925–26	18	14	4	0	28	94	57	1st South	Won Sask, Lost West Final	
1926–27	7	4	3	0	8	39	27	2nd South	Won Final, Lost Sask	
1927–28	10	2	8	0	4	24	38	4th	        out of playoffs	
1928–29	20	12	8	0	24	58	57	3rd South	Won Final, Won Sask, Lost West Semi Final	
1929–30	20	3	17	0	6	24	64	6th South	out of playoffs	
1930–31	20	11	5	4	26	43	32	2nd South	Won Final, Lost Sask	
1931–32	18	6	11	1	13	25	30	3rd South	out of playoffs	
1932–33	18	7	9	2	16	28	29	3rd South	out of playoffs	
1933–34	20	7	12	1	15	44	43	3rd South	out of playoffs	
1934–35	19	12	4	3	27	58	42	3rd South	Lost Final	
1935–36	20	3	17	0	6	38	37	6th South	out of playoffs	
1936–37	24	2	21	1	5	45	122	5th South	out of playoffs	
1937–38	24	7	13	4	18	76	99	T-4th South	Lost Quarter Final

== Junior team ==
The Victorias had a junior team for only four seasons. They won the Saskatchewan Junior Hockey League (SJHL) Championship in 1919–20 and 1920–21 but lost out in the Western Canada Memorial Cup playoffs in both seasons.

=== Saskatchewan Junior Hockey League (1917–1921) ===
GF = Goals for, GA = Goals against

Season	Games	Won	Lost	Tied	Points	GF	GA	Standing	Playoffs	
1917–18	6	5	1	0	10	32	20	Tied Group 1	Lost Group Final	
1918–19	10	8	2	0	16	97	41	Tied Group 1	Lost Group Final	
1919–20	6	5	1	0	10	–	–	1st Regina	Won Sask, Lost West Semi Final	
1920–21	5	3	2	0	6	–	–	1st Regina	Won Sask, Lost West Semi Final

== Notable players ==
This list is incomplete.

- E.L. (Hick) Abbott – namesake of the Abbott Cup, presented to Junior Hockey champion of Western Canada
- Dick Irvin (1919–1921) – future Hockey Hall of Fame player and coach
- Bernie Morris (1913–14) – Stanley Cup champion with 1917 Seattle Metropolitans
