= Chris Patrick (ice hockey) =

American ice hockey executive

- Born: January 2, 1976 (age 50); Leesburg, Virginia, U.S.
- Education: Princeton University; University of Virginia (MBA)
- Years active: 2008–present
- Employer: Washington Capitals (2008–present)
- Title: Senior vice president and general manager
- Term: 2024–present
- Father: Dick Patrick
- Relatives: Patrick family Muzz Patrick (grandfather); Lester Patrick (great-grandfather); Chris Young (brother-in-law)

Christopher Patrick (born January 2, 1976) is an American ice hockey executive who is the senior vice president and general manager of the Washington Capitals of the National Hockey League (NHL).

== Early life and education ==
Patrick was born in Leesburg, Virginia, on January 2, 1976. After playing youth hockey in the Washington, D.C. area, including for Capitals youth teams, Patrick attended the Kent School in Kent, Connecticut. Following his time at Kent, Patrick was drafted 197th overall in the eighth round of the 1994 NHL entry draft by the Capitals. However, he opted to continue his hockey career at Princeton University, spending four seasons with the Tigers of the Eastern College Athletic Conference, and winning a conference championship in 1998.

Patrick graduated from Princeton in 1998 with a bachelor's degree in political science and economics, and subsequently graduated from the Darden School of Business of the University of Virginia in 2006 with a Master of Business Administration. Before joining the Capitals, Patrick worked in investment banking and private equity, including for Deutsche Bank and Constellation Energy.

== Hockey career ==
Patrick joined the Washington Capitals as a scout in 2008 under then-general manager George McPhee. He was later promoted to director of player personnel by new general manager Brian MacLellan in 2014, and subsequently served as assistant general manager and associate general manager over the following ten years. Patrick's time as associate general manager saw him oversee analytics, player contract negotiations, and hockey operations, among other departments; he also worked alongside the staff of the Hershey Bears, aiding in the hiring processes of head coaches Todd Nelson and future Capitals head coach Spencer Carbery. Patrick won the Stanley Cup with Washington in 2018.

On July 8, 2024, the Capitals promoted Patrick to general manager, succeeding MacLellan; however, MacLellan remained as president of hockey operations, with Patrick reporting directly to him.

== Personal life ==
Patrick is a member of the Patrick family, dubbed "hockey's royal family." His great-grandfather Lester, great-granduncle Frank, granduncle Lynn, and cousin Craig are all members of the Hockey Hall of Fame, while his grandfather Muzz played for, coached, and served as general manager for the New York Rangers. His father Dick has been part of the Capitals organization since 1982, and has served as a minority owner, team chairman, and alternate governor; the Capitals' Stanley Cup victory in 2018 made Dick and Chris the sixth and seventh members of the family to win the Cup.

Patrick is the brother-in-law of Texas Rangers general manager Chris Young, who is married to his sister Elizabeth.

Patrick resides in Millersville, Maryland, with his wife Kelley and their four children.

Sporting positions
Preceded by Brian MacLellan	General manager of the Washington Capitals; 2024–present	Incumbent
