= Craig Patrick =

American professional ice hockey executive and former player

- Hockey Hall of Fame, 2001 (Builder)
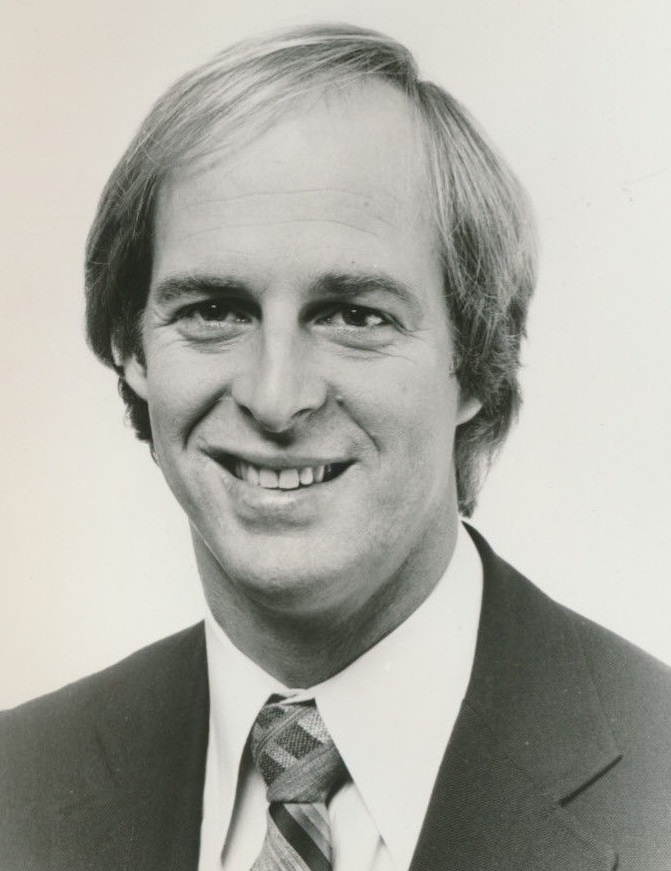
- Patrick in 1983
- Born: May 20, 1946 (age 80) Detroit, Michigan, U.S.
- Height: 6 ft 1 in (185 cm)
- Weight: 190 lb (86 kg; 13 st 8 lb)
- Position: Center
- Shot: Left
- Played for: California Golden Seals; St. Louis Blues; Kansas City Scouts; Minnesota Fighting Saints; Washington Capitals
- National team: United States
- Playing career: 1971–1979

Craig Patrick (born May 20, 1946) is an American former hockey player, coach and general manager, the son of Lynn Patrick and the grandson of Lester Patrick. During the 1980 Winter Olympics, Patrick was the assistant general manager and assistant coach under Herb Brooks for the United States men's national ice hockey team, which won the gold medal and defeated the Soviet Union in the "Miracle on Ice". From 1989 to 2006, Patrick was the general manager of the Pittsburgh Penguins where he oversaw back-to-back Stanley Cup championships in 1991 and 1992, as well as the drafting and signing of some players that would later win a Stanley Cup title for the Penguins in 2009.

== Amateur career ==
After spending most of his childhood in Wellesley, Massachusetts, he was sent at age fourteen to Quebec to play junior hockey in the Metropolitan Junior Hockey League for the Lachine Maroons and later the Montreal Junior Canadiens.

He attended the University of Denver where he helped guide the Pioneers hockey team to the NCAA championship in 1968 and 1969. He played on the US National Team for 1969–70 and 1970–71 seasons, including the 1970 and 1971 Ice Hockey World Championship tournaments while serving in the US Army.

== Career as a professional player ==
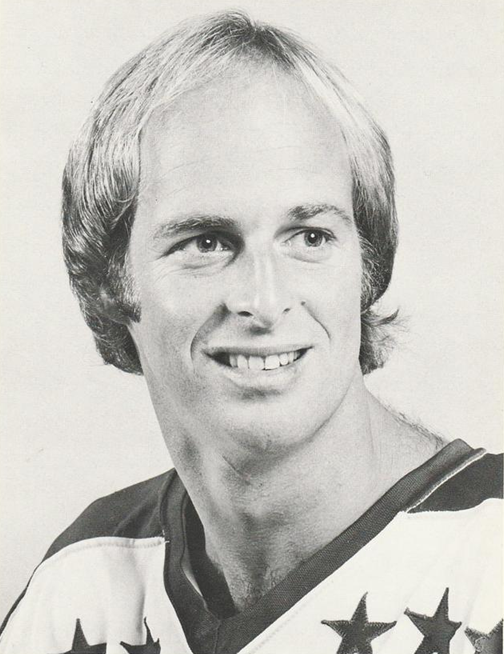
Craig Patrick in 1977 photo for Washington Capitals

Patrick's pro career was comparatively modest but he did play eight seasons in NHL with the California Golden Seals, the St. Louis Blues, the Kansas City Scouts, and the Washington Capitals. He also played briefly for the Minnesota Fighting Saints of the World Hockey Association in 1976–77 before jumping back to the NHL when the Saints folded. He amassed 72 goals, 91 assists, and 163 points in 401 NHL games during his playing career. He also was a member of Team USA at the inaugural 1976 Canada Cup tournament and also played for the U.S. at the 1979 Ice Hockey World Championship tournament in Moscow, shortly before retiring from professional hockey.

== The Miracle on Ice ==
Patrick served as assistant general manager and assistant coach under Herb Brooks for the 1980 US Olympic Gold Medal-winning hockey team, the Miracle on Ice.

Patrick was also the general manager for the 2002 US Olympic team, also coached by Brooks, which won the silver medal – the first US hockey medal since the 1980 team. This tournament was further notable as it was largely the same roster that underperformed in the 1998 Olympics, yet aging players like Mike Richter and Phil Housley performed well beyond expectations and were named to the 2002 tournament all-star team.

During both Olympic tournaments, the Team USA defeated the Soviets/Russians. Interestingly, both games were played on Friday, February 22, in their respective years, with a one-goal victory for Team USA. Team USA would also play for the gold medal on Sunday, February 24, but would lose to Canada in 2002.

== NHL management and beyond ==
In 1980, he became director of operations for the New York Rangers and in 1981 became the youngest general manager in Rangers history. He also served as head coach of the Rangers for parts of two seasons (1980–81 and 1984–85).

He was named general manager of the Pittsburgh Penguins on December 5, 1989, succeeding Tony Esposito, who in one of his last moves had traded for goaltender Tom Barrasso. During his tenure, the Penguins won two Stanley Cup championships, one President's Trophy, and five division titles. Patrick also served as head coach of the Penguins twice, during the 1989–90 and 1996–97 seasons.

His early years as GM of the Penguins are remembered as some of the most productive in the history of the franchise. In 1990, he spent his first round draft pick on Czechoslovak forward Jaromír Jágr. He traded the Penguins' second round pick that year to Calgary for Joe Mullen, a player the Flames had considered to be over the hill. Perhaps his most legendary trade occurred March 4, 1991, when he sent John Cullen, Jeff Parker and Zarley Zalapski to the Hartford Whalers in exchange for Ron Francis, Ulf Samuelsson and Grant Jennings. The move was viewed as a huge gamble. Cullen was the fifth leading scorer in the NHL at the time. However, the players Patrick acquired in the trade played big roles in the Penguins' Stanley Cup championship victories in 1991 and 1992.

=== Later years as GM ===
The Penguins also reached the Conference Final in 1996 and 2001.

However his later years were plagued by the Penguins' financial woes as well as a series of poor trades.

Perhaps his most infamous trades came in March 1996 when he sent future NHL scoring ace Markus Näslund to the Vancouver Canucks in exchange for Alek Stojanov, a role player with just two career NHL goals; a 2003 Sports Illustrated article described this as the "worst trade in NHL history". Then, in an effort to appease then player and captain Mario Lemieux, Patrick traded top scoring defenseman Sergei Zubov to the Dallas Stars for Kevin Hatcher, a slower moving and older version of Zubov with less upside at that point in their careers.

In July 2001, Patrick sent Jagr and role player František Kučera to the Washington Capitals for three minor league prospects (Kris Beech, Michal Sivek, Ross Lupaschuk) and nearly US$5 million cash. The deal was forced by the Penguins financial woes (indeed this saved the club much money as Jagr would fail to live up to expectations with the Capitals), as well as Jagr's growing dissatisfaction with the Penguins. The trade was nonetheless widely criticized in the Pittsburgh media, as the three prospects acquired in the deal never made any significant contribution to the Penguins' organization. Another reason for this criticism was that the New York Rangers allegedly were willing to make a deal which would have given Pittsburgh two established players and higher quality prospects. However, many believed Patrick resented the Rangers for firing him earlier in his GM career, which made him ask for a greater and to an extent unfair return. One published report had Patrick demanding Petr Nedvěd, Radek Dvořák and Mike York, as well as two prospects for Jágr, which Rangers GM Glen Sather quickly shot down as Patrick's demands were unreasonable.

From the 2001–02 season onwards, Penguins missed the playoffs in the next four seasons of Patrick's term as general manager.

After the 2004–05 lockout, in the 2005 off-season, Patrick drafted teen phenomenon Sidney Crosby with the first overall pick. Patrick also acquired veterans Žigmund Pálffy, Sergei Gonchar, John LeClair and Mark Recchi. While 18-year-old Crosby became the youngest player in NHL history to score 100 points, the older free agents had little to show for the millions that Patrick spent on them (though Gonchar would remain a key player in 2008–09). The Penguins finished last in the Atlantic Division for the fourth consecutive time. After 17 years as Penguins General Manager, Patrick was relieved of his duties on April 20, 2006, when his expiring contract was not renewed by team president Ken Sawyer. Succeeding GM Ray Shero praised Patrick's selection of Marc-André Fleury, Crosby, and Evgeni Malkin, but also said that work had to be done to build up the depth and third/fourth lines for the long-term, rather than a quick-fix.

Patrick was initially bitter about his firing and stayed away from hockey-related activities for a while afterwards. The Penguins returned to the postseason in 2007, with Crosby being named regular season MVP and winning the scoring title, though they lost in five games to eventual finalists, the Ottawa Senators.

In 2008, Patrick accepted an invitation from owner Mario Lemieux to watch the game in the owners box where the Penguins defeated the Philadelphia Flyers to take the Eastern Conference championship. Patrick's later draft picks, Marc-Andre Fleury, Evgeni Malkin and Sidney Crosby were credited with the team's advance to the Stanley Cup Final that year, where they lost to the Detroit Red Wings in six games. In 2009, these players had instrumental roles in Pittsburgh's Stanley Cup win.

=== Draft history ===
His tenure as GM also saw a hit and miss record in the NHL entry draft. Sparkling first round picks early in his tenure such as Jagr, Martin Straka and Naslund were balanced by later first round busts such as Chris Wells, Robert Dome, Craig Hillier, Milan Kraft and Stefan Bergkvist. Productive drafts in the early 2000s produced young talent such as Marc-André Fleury, Evgeni Malkin and Sidney Crosby, but could not reverse the growing opinion in the public or among team management that Patrick had lost his touch.

== Patrick family history ==
Multiple members of the Patrick family have won the Stanley Cup.

Lester (Craig's grandfather) with Montreal Wanderers 1906, 1907 (player), Victoria Cougars 1925 (president/manager-coach), New York Rangers 1928 (playing manager-coach), 1933 (manager-coach), 1940 (manager)

Frank (Craig's grand uncle) – Vancouver Millionaires 1915 (playing president/manager-coach),

Lynn (Craig's father) – New York Rangers 1940 (player)

Murray (Craig's uncle) – New York Rangers 1940 (player)

Craig Patrick – Pittsburgh Penguins 1991, 1992 (general manager)

Chris Patrick (Craig's cousin, grandson of Murray) - Washington Capitals 2018 (director of player personnel)

Dick Patrick (Craig's cousin, son of Murray) - Washington Capitals 2018 (president)

Other family members:

Glenn (Craig's brother) – never won the Stanley Cup.

Curtiss (Craig's nephew) – minor league hockey player in the AHL and ECHL.

== Other ==
Patrick was named "The Sporting News" Executive-of-the-Year in 1998 and 1999. He is the third generation of his family to have his name inscribed on the Stanley Cup and the third generation to be enshrined in the Hockey Hall of Fame (in the Builder Category). Patrick spent two years as athletic director at the University of Denver (his alma mater) in 1988–1989. He was enshrined into the United States Hockey Hall of Fame in 1996. He was awarded the Lester Patrick Trophy, named for his grandfather, in the 1999–2000 season for his outstanding service to hockey in the United States.

In December 2011, the Columbus Blue Jackets hired Patrick as a senior advisor to Hockey Operations.

On January 9, 2014, the Buffalo Sabres hired Patrick as a Special Advisor in the Hockey Operations Department.

Patrick returned to the Pittsburgh Penguins on November 19, 2018, joining the front office as a professional scout.

In 2020, Patrick joined 3ICE, a professional 3-on-3 ice hockey league, as the league's commissioner. In 2023, Patrick also became a head coach for his own team in the league, while still serving as commissioner.

== Career statistics ==
=== Regular season and playoffs ===
			Regular season					Playoffs
Season	Team	League	GP	G	A	Pts	PIM	GP	G	A	Pts	PIM
1963–64	Lachine Maroons	MMJHL	43	12	31	43	12	—	—	—	—	—
1964–65	Montreal Junior Canadiens	OHA	56	13	18	31	18	7	1	0	1	2
1965–66	Los Angeles Hechter Hawks	CalHL	9	15	8	23	4	—	—	—	—	—
1966–67	University of Denver	WCHA	30	18	16	34	6	—	—	—	—	—
1967–68	University of Denver	WCHA	34	23	26	49	12	—	—	—	—	—
1968–69	University of Denver	WCHA	17	7	8	15	6	—	—	—	—	—
1969–70	University of Denver	WCHA	5	9	7	16	—	—	—	—	—	—
1970–71	Montreal Voyageurs	AHL	3	0	1	1	0	—	—	—	—	—
1971–72	California Golden Seals	NHL	59	8	3	11	12	—	—	—	—	—
1971–72	Baltimore Clippers	AHL	12	3	0	3	0	—	—	—	—	—
1972–73	California Golden Seals	NHL	71	20	22	42	6	—	—	—	—	—
1973–74	California Golden Seals	NHL	59	10	20	30	17	—	—	—	—	—
1974–75	California Golden Seals	NHL	14	2	1	3	0	—	—	—	—	—
1974–75	St. Louis Blues	NHL	43	6	9	15	6	2	0	1	1	0
1975–76	Kansas City Scouts	NHL	80	17	18	35	14	—	—	—	—	—
1976–77	Washington Capitals	NHL	28	7	10	17	2	—	—	—	—	—
1976–77	Minnesota Fighting Saints	WHA	30	6	11	17	6	—	—	—	—	—
1977–78	Washington Capitals	NHL	44	1	7	8	4	—	—	—	—	—
1977–78	Hershey Bears	AHL	27	5	4	9	4	—	—	—	—	—
1978–79	Washington Capitals	NHL	3	1	1	2	0	—	—	—	—	—
1978–79	Tulsa Oilers	CHL	69	22	23	45	12	—	—	—	—	—
1978–79	Los Angeles Blades	PHL	7	0	1	1	27	—	—	—	—	—
WHA totals			30	6	11	17	6	—	—	—	—	—
NHL totals			401	72	91	163	61	2	0	1	1	0

=== International ===
Year	Team	Event	GP	G	A	Pts	PIM
1970	United States	WC-B	7	8	5	13	2
1971	United States	WC	10	3	2	5	2
1976	United States	CC	5	2	2	4	0
1979	United States	WC	8	0	3	3	2
Senior totals			30	13	12	25	6

=== Coaching record ===
League	Team	Year	Regular season						Post season
League	Team	Year	G	W	L	T	Pts	Finish	Result
NHL
NHL	New York Rangers	1980–81	60	26	23	11	62	4th in Patrick	Lost in Conference Final
NHL	New York Rangers	1984–85	35	11	22	2	24	4th in Patrick	Lost in first round
NHL	Pittsburgh Penguins	1989–90	54	22	26	6	48	5th in Patrick	Missed playoffs
NHL	Pittsburgh Penguins	1996–97	20	7	10	3	17	2nd in Northeast	Lost in first round
3ICE	Team Patrick	2023	6	4	2	0	6	2nd	Lost in finals
NHL Totals			169	66	81	22			

== See also ==
- List of members of the United States Hockey Hall of Fame
- Notable families in the NHL

== In popular culture ==
In a 1981 TV movie about the 1980 U.S. hockey team called Miracle on Ice, Patrick is portrayed by Robert Pierce.

In a 2004 Disney film about the team called Miracle, he is played by Noah Emmerich.

Sporting positions
Preceded by Fred Shero	Head coach of the New York Rangers; 1980–81	Succeeded by Herb Brooks
Preceded by Herb Brooks	Head coach of the New York Rangers; 1985	Succeeded by Ted Sator
Preceded by Gene Ubriaco	Head coach of the Pittsburgh Penguins; 1989–90	Succeeded by Bob Johnson
Preceded by Eddie Johnston	Head coach of the Pittsburgh Penguins; 1996–97	Succeeded by Kevin Constantine
Preceded by Tony Esposito	General Manager of the Pittsburgh Penguins; 1989–2006	Succeeded by Ray Shero
Preceded by Fred Shero	General Manager of the New York Rangers; 1980–86	Succeeded by Phil Esposito
