= Dick Patrick =

Canadian-born sports executive (born 1946)

Richard Patrick
- Born: 1946 (age 79–80); Victoria, British Columbia, Canada
- Education: Dartmouth College
- Occupation: President
- Years active: 1982–present
- Employer: Washington Capitals
- Organization: National Hockey League

Richard Patrick (born 1946) is a Canadian-born sports executive and is the part-owner, president and alternate governor of the Washington Capitals of the National Hockey League (NHL). He is the son of Muzz Patrick, the grandson of Lester Patrick, the grandnephew of Frank Patrick, and the cousin of both Craig Patrick and Glenn Patrick.

Patrick graduated from Kent School in 1964 where he captained the hockey team and rowed on the varsity crew. He then attended and graduated from Dartmouth College in 1968.

For his contributions to ice hockey in the United States, Patrick was awarded the Lester Patrick Trophy, named for his grandfather, in 2012.

Patrick is the father-in-law of Texas Rangers general manager Chris Young, who is married to his daughter Elizabeth. Patrick is also the father of Capitals general manager Chris Patrick, who was named to the role in 2024.
