= Chris Young (pitcher) =

American baseball player and executive (born 1979)

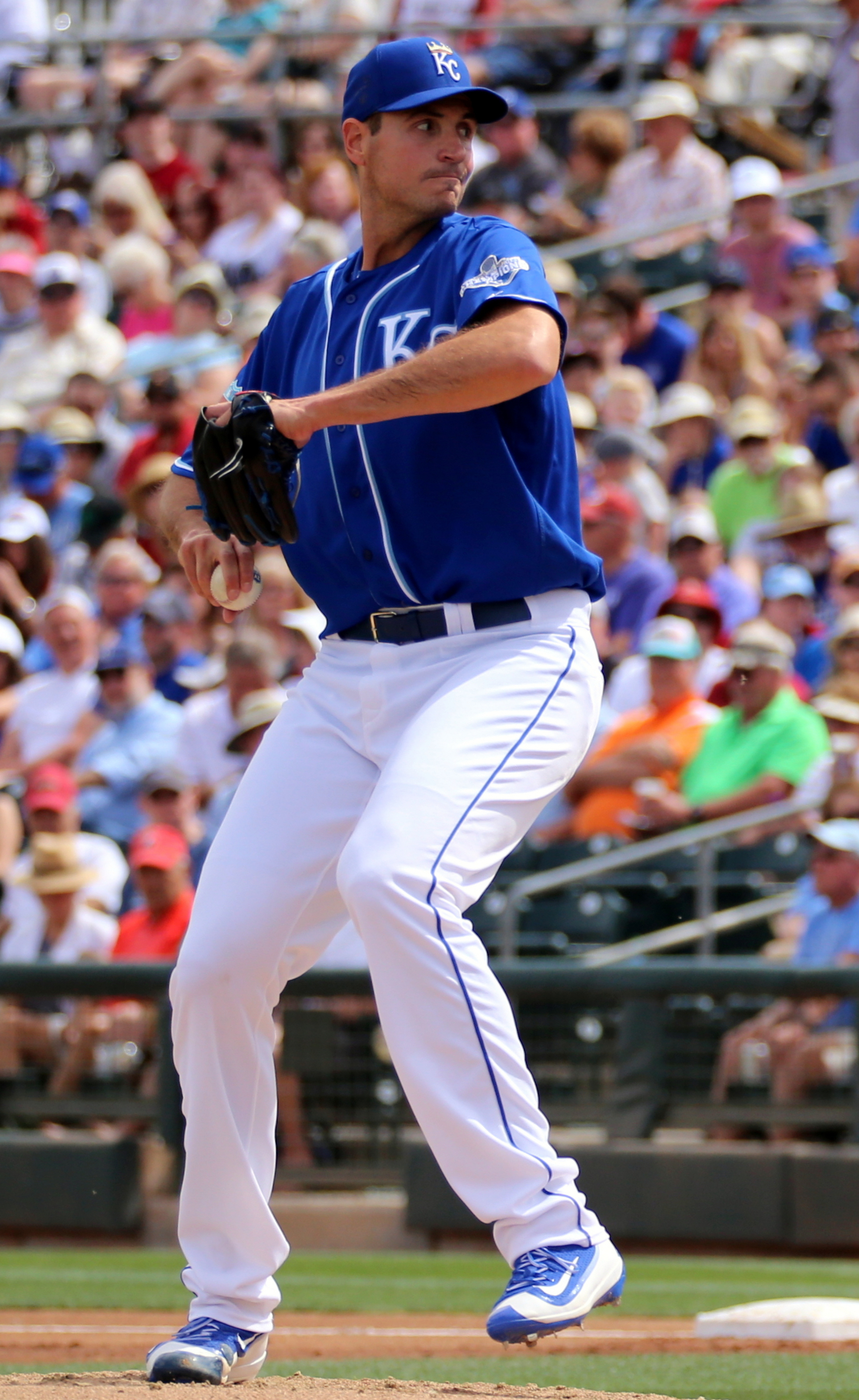
- Young with the Kansas City Royals in 2016

Texas Rangers
- Pitcher / President of Baseball Operations
- Born: May 25, 1979 (age 47); Dallas, Texas, U.S.
- Batted: Right Threw: Right

MLB debut
- August 24, 2004, for the Texas Rangers

Last MLB appearance
- June 17, 2017, for the Kansas City Royals

MLB statistics
- Win–loss record: 79–67
- Earned run average: 3.95
- Strikeouts: 1,062
- Stats at Baseball Reference

Teams
- Texas Rangers (2004–2005); San Diego Padres (2006–2010); New York Mets (2011–2012); Seattle Mariners (2014); Kansas City Royals (2015–2017)

Career highlights and awards
- All-Star (2007); 2× World Series champion (2015, 2023); AL Comeback Player of the Year (2014)

Christopher Ryan Young (born May 25, 1979) is an American former professional baseball pitcher and current president of baseball operations of the Texas Rangers, serving in the team's front office since 2020. He played in Major League Baseball as a right-handed pitcher from 2000 to 2017 for the Texas Rangers, San Diego Padres, New York Mets, Seattle Mariners and the Kansas City Royals. Young was a 2007 National League (NL) All-Star player as a member of the Padres, and was a member of the 2015 World Series winning Kansas City Royals team. After his playing career, he worked for the Major League Baseball front office before becoming the general manager of the Rangers in 2020, and promoted to his current position in November 2024.

At the age of 25, Young made his MLB debut on August 24, 2004 with the Rangers. He had previously excelled in basketball and baseball at Highland Park High School in University Park, Texas, and Princeton University.

Young helped Highland Park reach the Class 4A Region II basketball final in 1997 and the Class 4A Texas state basketball final in 1998. He tossed a no-hitter in 1997 while compiling a 6–0 record, helping Highland Park reach the Class 4A Texas state baseball final. During his senior year, he was District Most Valuable Player in basketball, and led his baseball team to the state championship, while pitching in two no-hitters. That year, he was a first-team All-State selection in basketball and baseball. After a high school career as an athlete and scholar, Young excelled in both baseball and basketball for Princeton University and became the Ivy League's first male two-sport Rookie of the Year.

Selected by the Pittsburgh Pirates in the third round of the June 2000 draft, he had brief professional experiences in the Pirates, Montreal Expos, and Texas Rangers minor league systems before debuting with the Rangers in August 2004. Young's professional baseball career took off in the 2006 season, when he was the major league leader in opponent batting average, hits per nine innings and road earned run average (ERA) and was named the National League Pitcher of the Month for June. Additionally, he extended his streak of consecutive undefeated games started as a visiting pitcher to 24, and secured the only Padres win in the team's 3–1 series loss to the St. Louis Cardinals in the 2006 National League Division Series. In 2007, he defended his opponent batting average and hits per nine innings titles, but instead of winning the road ERA title he won the home ERA title.

He is 6 feet 10 inches (2.08 m), which makes him, along with former pitchers Eric Hillman, Randy Johnson, Andrew Brackman and Andrew Sisco, the second tallest player in baseball history, next to relief pitcher Jon Rauch (who is 6 feet 11 inches (2.11 m) and Young's teammate on the 2012 New York Mets) and Sean Hjelle. He was elected to the 2007 MLB All-Star Game as a first-time All-Star via the All-Star Final Vote.

== Early life ==
Christopher Ryan Young was born on May 25, 1979, in Midland, Texas. Young attended Highland Park High School in University Park, Texas, where he played basketball and baseball. He lettered three times in basketball, in a career in which he scored over 1,000 points, and accumulated 500 rebounds and 200 blocks. He was a two-year letterman in baseball, compiling a 14–3 record with 180 strikeouts. In basketball, he averaged 16 points, 12 rebounds, and 3 blocked shots a game, and in baseball he had an 8–3 record with a 1.70 ERA and 95 strikeouts in 80 innings pitched.

As a sophomore in the fall of 1995, he was moved up to the varsity basketball team from the junior varsity due to injuries. As a junior, his presence was significant enough that one opposing team practiced with a coach holding a broom in the air to simulate playing against him. He helped his team reach the Class 4A-state Region II final. As a junior in baseball, Young threw a no-hitter against McKinney High School in Spring 1997. However, he missed a large part of the season after getting off to a 6–0 start because of a stress fracture in his foot. Nonetheless, he was already considered a top professional prospect, and he was named as one of seven Highland Park players on the all-district team. By the summer of 1997, he was able to play for the Dallas Mustangs who were the defending national champions in the Connie Mack World Series, and he earned the win in the fifth place game of the World Series.

By January of Young's senior season, he had led his basketball team to a district-leading 23–1 (4–0 in district) record and first place in both The Dallas Morning News' Class 4A area poll and the Texas Association of Basketball Coaches' state poll. Young developed a reputation as a finesse post player, and that season he led his team to the UIL State Tournament championship game. Highland Park lost to Houston's Waltrip High School and Young was credited with a tournament-high 18 rebounds by the Fort Worth Star-Telegram, although The Dallas Morning News only credited him with 17 points and 14 rebounds. Young finished his senior season as a Texas Association of Basketball Coaches' first-team All-State selection and the District 9-4A Most Valuable Player. He was later chosen to play in the mid-summer Texas High School Coaches Association's Southwestern All-Star basketball game at the Hofheinz Pavilion.

Young announced he planned to attend Princeton in May 1998. He chose Princeton over Boston College, University of Oklahoma, University of Pennsylvania, University of Texas, Vanderbilt University, and Yale University. Young's decision was based on Princeton's rising national profile in basketball and the opportunity to work with baseball coach Scott Bradley, who had played catcher for the Seattle Mariners while 6–10 pitcher Randy Johnson was with the team.

On May 9, 1998, Young was involved in a combined no-hitter when he pitched into the fifth inning against Moisés E. Molina High School and was relieved by Mike Matthews. Highland Park won this game, which was the clinching Region II best-of-3 bi-district series game, by the 10-run rule. Young displayed home run power as a senior, and in some games, he played designated hitter. Later that month, Young pitched another no-hitter in another 10-run rule victory, this time against Carthage High School. Young was the starting pitcher at UFCU Disch-Falk Field during the Texas state 4A championship game victory against Calallen High School, and he clinched the game with a successful pickoff move. He was selected to the Texas High School Baseball Coaches Association 1998 All-State baseball team as well as The Texas Sports Writers Association third-team Class 4A all-state baseball.

== College career ==
In his freshman season at Princeton University, Young was the first male athlete to be named Ivy League Rookie of the Year in two sports—basketball and baseball—and was a unanimous selection for both awards. In addition, Young was named second-team All-Ivy in basketball and was basketball Rookie of the Week each of the final six weeks and seven weeks overall. His season was capped with Ivy League Player of the Year and freshman All-America honors from Basketball Weekly. Statistically, Young set Princeton Tigers men's basketball freshman records for points (387) and rebounds (160) by averaging 12.9 points and 5.3 rebounds a game with the 1998–99 Tigers. He also had 39 points, 19 rebounds, and 15 assists in three games at the Rainbow Classic basketball tournament, hosted by the University of Hawaii. He posted a season-high 24 points in a National Invitation Tournament win against the NC State Wolfpack. In baseball, Young led Princeton and the Ivy League with a 2.38 ERA. During this performance he allowed only one home run over the course of 150 batters faced, and was twice named Ivy League Rookie of the Week.

Young concluded his college basketball career by starting every game with the 1999–2000 team. Among his accomplishments that season were 22 double-digit scoring games, breaking his own single-season school record for blocked shots with 87, and leading the team with 13.8 points per game, 6.3 rebounds per game, 87 blocked shots and 40 steals. He was also second on the team with 105 assists. Young had the highest rebounding average of any Princeton player since 1978 and was also the 13th player in school history to record 100 assists in a season. For his college basketball career, Young accumulated 801 points, 350 rebounds, and 142 blocks. His best game performances included a 20-point game on the road against the 11th-ranked Kansas Jayhawks, a career-high 30 points against Harvard, and a school record of nine blocked shots against the Ohio Bobcats.

During his sophomore baseball season in 2000, Young was the Ivy League's leading pitcher with a 1.82 ERA overall and a 1.05 figure in conference games. He compiled a perfect record of 5–0 in eight appearances, with 52 strikeouts in 49 1/3 innings. Young was a unanimous first-team All-Ivy League baseball selection, and he led the Tigers to their first Ivy League title since 1996. Young pitched a complete game and struck out seven batters in the 5–2 win in the championship series opener against Dartmouth. In 2000, he played collegiate summer baseball for the Chatham A's of the Cape Cod Baseball League.

Young was selected by the Pittsburgh Pirates in the third round of the 2000 MLB draft and signed a $1.65 million contract with Pittsburgh on September 6 after holding out until he gained assurances that he would be able to complete his collegiate education. He completed his degree at Princeton in politics in June 2002, during his stint in Minor League Baseball. He played in the class A minor leagues after his junior year. Young then completed his senior thesis, entitled "The Impact of Jackie Robinson and the Integration of Baseball on Racial Stereotypes in America: A Quantitative Content Analysis of Stories about Race in the New York Times" while commuting on minor league buses as a player for the Hickory Crawdads. Young was also offered a two-year guaranteed contract to play basketball for the Sacramento Kings of the National Basketball Association in 2002 by fellow Princeton alum and Kings president Geoff Petrie.

== Professional career ==
=== Draft and minor leagues ===
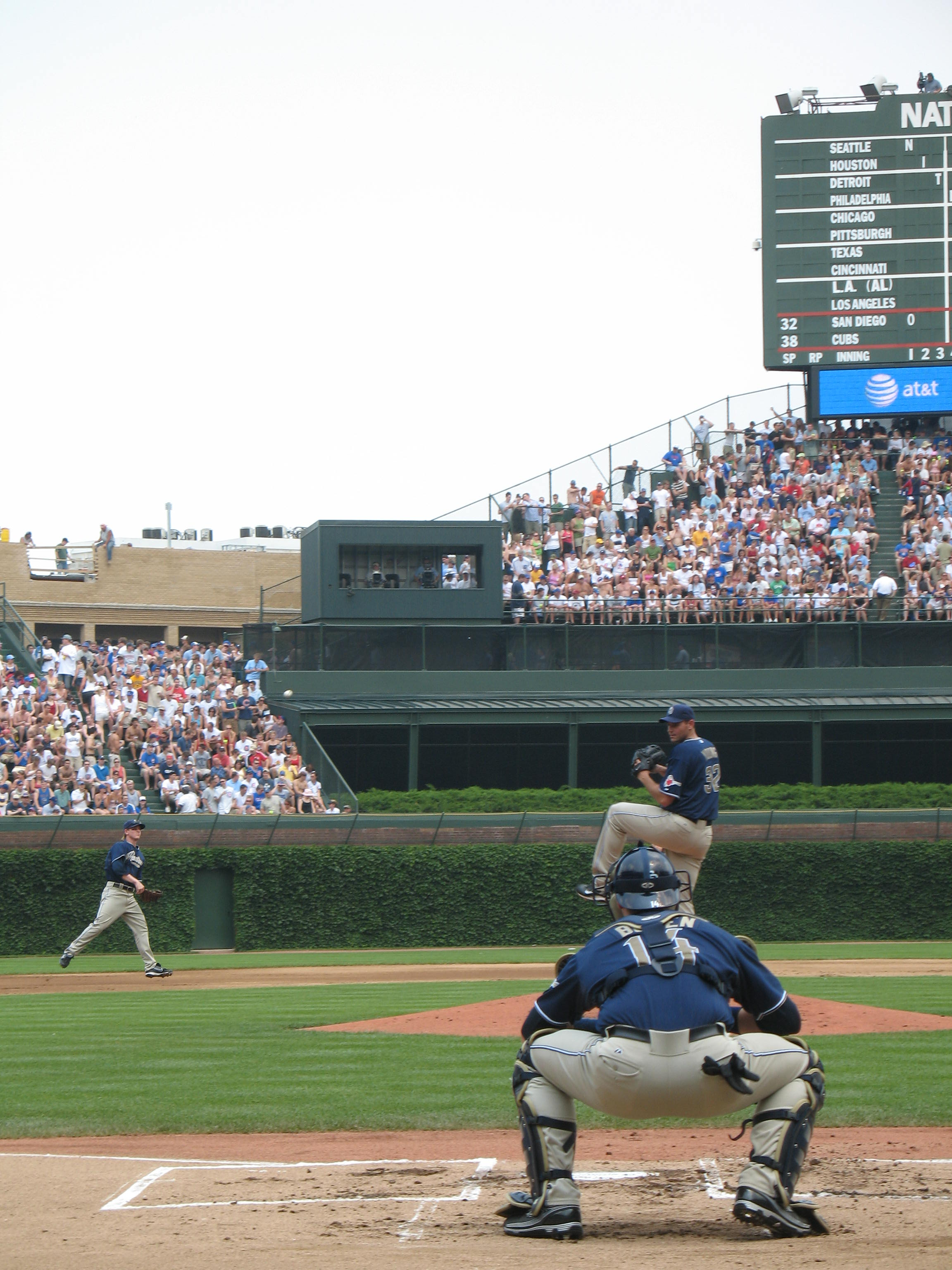
Young warms up before a game at Chicago

Young was drafted by the Pittsburgh Pirates in the third round of the 2000 MLB draft. He was signed to a deal on September 6. After a few years of minor league service, he was traded to the Montreal Expos' organization. The Expos traded him to the Texas Rangers, for whom he eventually made his major league debut. After less than two seasons with the Rangers, he was traded to the San Diego Padres.

In 2001, Young went 5–3 with a 4.12 ERA in 12 starts for the Hickory Crawdads in the Class-A South Atlantic League, including two complete games. In 2002, Young helped the Crawdads to the league title with an 11–9 record and 3.11 ERA in 26 starts. Young earned decisions in fifteen straight starts from April 16 and July 4. He allowed more than three earned runs in just two of 26 starts. Opposing batters batted .234. He was traded to the Montreal Expos with Jon Searles for pitcher Matt Herges after the season. Young began the 2003 season on the disabled list before joining the Brevard County Manatees of the Florida State League towards the end of April. He posted a 5–2 record with a 1.62 ERA, and held opposing batters to a .150 batting average in eight starts. His season was highlighted by an eight-inning, one-hit, no-walk, eight-strikeout performance against the Fort Myers Miracle on May 11. This capped a 3–0, 0.47 ERA start to the season.

In June 2003, Young was promoted to the Harrisburg Senators of the Double-A Eastern League. He went 4–4 with a 4.01 ERA in 15 starts. In July, he went 3–0 and finished with an ERA of 3.03 over five starts. His season was highlighted by an eight-strikeout final outing on August 30 against the Norwich Navigators and a win on July 27 against the Reading Phillies in which he threw seven shutout innings. He was traded by the Montreal Expos to the Texas Rangers organization on April 3, 2004, in a preseason deal along with Josh McKinley for Einar Díaz and Justin Echols. He started the 2004 season with the Frisco RoughRiders of the Texas League where he went 6–5 with a 4.48 ERA in 18 starts. The only two home runs he allowed in his final 12 starts and 61 innings with the RoughRiders occurred on July 3, against Round Rock. He struck out a season-high eight batters on May 9 against El Paso.

Young was promoted to the Triple-A Oklahoma RedHawks of the Pacific Coast League in late July and went a perfect 3–0 with a 1.48 ERA in five starts. During this brief stint he allowed only nine walks while compiling 34 strikeouts, and held opposition batters to a .189 average. He posted four quality starts, and in his fifth start he only allowed two runs. The club was 4–1 in his PCL starts. The only loss was due to a blown save with a 4–2 ninth-inning lead on August 7 against the Tacoma Rainiers in a game in which Young allowed no earned runs. He was named Pacific Coast League Pitcher of the Week for August 16 to 22 after his last start on August 18 against the Memphis Redbirds. Young took a no-hitter into the sixth inning of his second Triple-A start on August 2 against the Sacramento River Cats.

=== Texas Rangers (2004–2005) ===
==== 2004 ====
Young debuted with the Rangers on August 24, 2004, against the Minnesota Twins. He pitched 5 2/3 innings, giving up four hits and three earned runs, while striking out four and walking three batters. Young exited the game trailing 3–0, but was rescued by a comeback walk-off 5–4 win.

This debut made Young the first Princeton baseball player to start a major league game at any position since Dave Sisler (son of Hall of Famer George Sisler and brother of Dick Sisler) gave up six earned runs in just over four innings on August 27, 1961, in the second game of a doubleheader against the Detroit Tigers. The game also marked the first appearance in a major league game by a Princeton baseball player since Bob Tufts played his final game for the Kansas City Royals on May 6, 1983. Other Princeton baseball players who have recorded either 50 innings pitched or 130 at bats (the requirements to qualify for Rookie of the Year) in the major leagues are Moe Berg, Homer Hillebrand, King Lear, Dutch Meier, Dutch Sterrett, and Bobby Vaughn. Young has been joined in the major leagues by Princetonian Ross Ohlendorf who debuted for the New York Yankees on September 11, 2007. Another Princetonian, Tim Lahey, was on the Philadelphia Phillies roster from the team's Opening Day on March 31, 2008, until April 5, 2008, without making an appearance.

The debut, which occurred in a home game at Ameriquest Field in Arlington, served as a homecoming for Young who grew up in nearby Dallas, Texas and went to Highland Park High School. With his debut, Young became the second-tallest player in Major League Baseball, only an inch shorter than the 6-foot-11-inch (2.11 m) Jon Rauch. Three other current and previous pitchers—Randy Johnson, Andrew Sisco and Eric Hillman—are also 6 feet 10 inches (2.08 m). He became the tallest pitcher in Rangers history, surpassing the 6-foot-8-inch (2.03 m) right-handed pitcher Mike Smithson. After becoming part of the starting rotation, he made seven starts and compiled a 3–2 record with a 4.71 ERA. Young signed a three-year contract through 2007 on November 19.

Young's first major league decision came during his second start in an August 29 loss to the Baltimore Orioles. His first win came in his third start on September 4 against the Boston Red Sox. His fifth start was a six-inning performance in a 1–0 win against the Anaheim Angels on September 19. This was the first Ranger 1–0 victory since August 25, 2000 against the Toronto Blue Jays, a stretch of 669 games. The club went 5–2 during his starts in his brief 2004 stint with the club.

==== 2005 ====
Young was one of three rookies on the Opening Day roster. He made 31 starts in 2005 with the Rangers, compiling a 12–7 record with a 4.26 ERA. His twelve victories tied Kevin Brown's record for most wins by a Rangers rookie. His season started slowly, with seven earned runs allowed in 7 1/3 innings pitched (8.59 ERA) over his first two starts. However, over the course of 11 starts from April 17 – June 13, he lowered his ERA to a season-low 2.78 by going 6–2, 2.18 in 70 1/3 innings pitched over that stretch. This included the month of May when he went 3–0 in five starts with a 1.42 ERA that was third-best among all qualifying major leaguers for the month. This included his season-high 13 2/3 scoreless innings recorded from May 3–9. He had subsequent hot and cold streaks, with a record of 2–4 and a 9.07 ERA in nine starts from June 20 – August 2, followed by a 2.53 ERA over his final nine starts. He closed out the season by winning his final four decisions, which was a personal best.

May 9 was one of two times Young came within an inning of a shutout by pitching eight scoreless innings; August 17 against the Cleveland Indians was the other. Young recorded a personal-best eight strikeouts in a seven-inning no-decision on June 2 at Detroit. The closest Young came to a no-hitter was 5 2/3 innings of hitless pitching in a road game against the Houston Astros on June 25 before allowing a Craig Biggio single in the sixth inning. Over the course of the season, Young was the beneficiary of the second-highest run support in the majors, trailing only David Wells of the Boston Red Sox. However, he surrendered three runs or less in 22 of 31 starts. After a 2005 season when he went 5–0 with a 3.47 ERA in 11 games during the day and 7–7 with a 4.71 ERA in 20 games at night, he had a career 8–1 record with a 3.31 ERA in 15 day games and 7–8 with a 5.05 mark in 23 games at night.

In his rookie season, Young ranked in the top five among qualifying major league rookies in several statistical categories: strikeouts (second, 137), wins (tied for third, 12), ERA (fourth, 4.26), starts (fifth, 31) and innings pitched (fifth, 164 2/3). He also tied Rangers rookie club records: wins (12, Edwin Correa in 1986 and Kevin Brown in 1989) and pre All-Star break wins (8, Jeff Zimmerman in 1999 and José Guzmán in 1986). Young ranked fifth among all American League pitchers with 7.5 strikeouts per 9 innings.

=== San Diego Padres (2006–2010) ===
==== 2006 ====
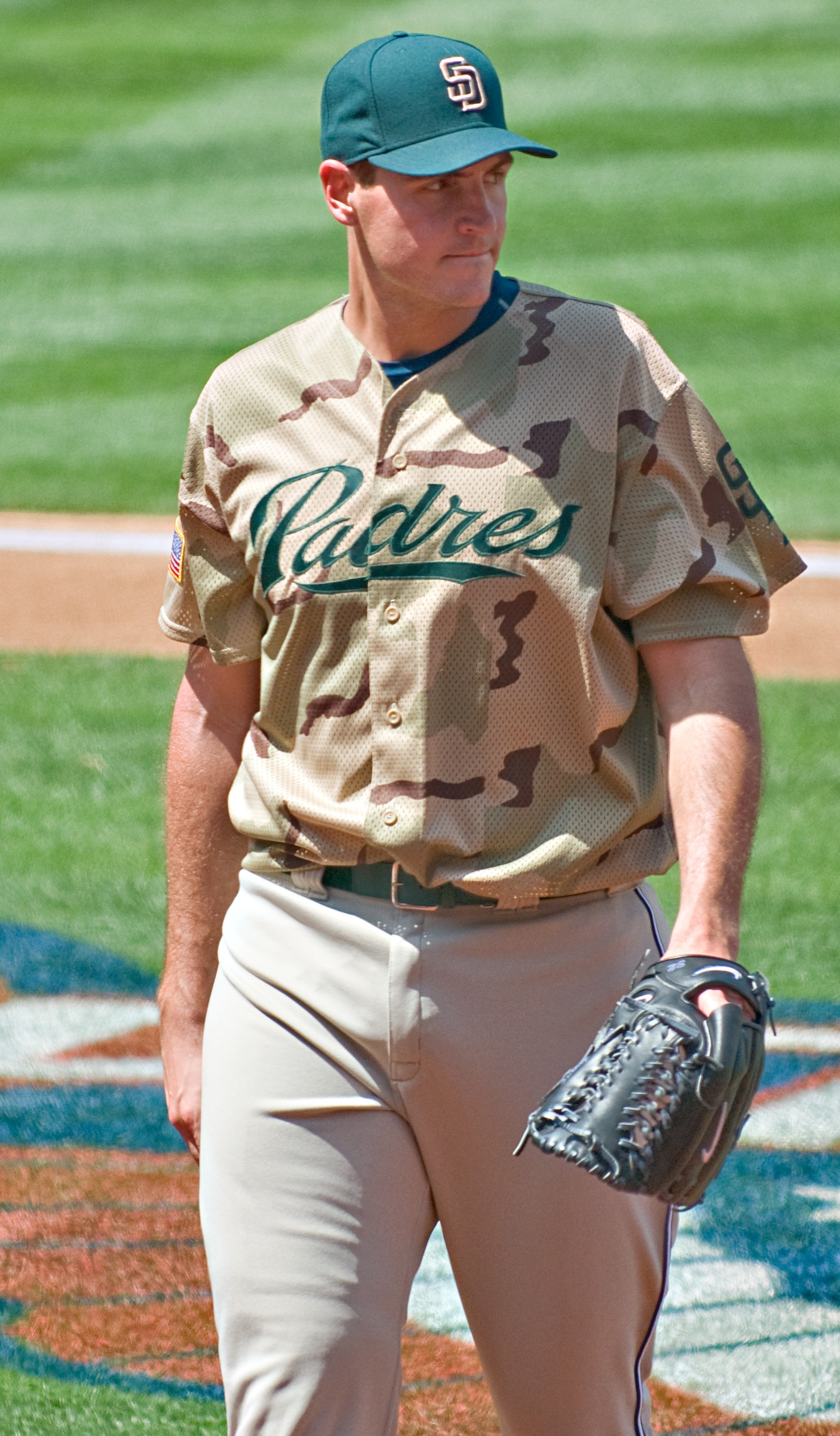
Chris Young wearing the Padres military-style jersey

Despite his success, however, he was a key part of an offseason trade that also sent Terrmel Sledge and Adrián González to the San Diego Padres for starting pitcher Adam Eaton, middle reliever Akinori Otsuka and minor-league catcher Billy Killian. 2006 marked Young's breakout season. His ERA continued its downward trend, falling to 3.46 over 31 starts, good enough for sixth best in the National League, and he recorded a career-high 169 strikeouts. He finished with an 11–5 record, led all major league pitchers with a 2.41 road ERA, allowed a league-leading 6.72 hits per 9 innings pitched, and a .206 opponent batting average. He had 15 no decisions, the most among MLB starting pitchers in 2006. During 2006 he led the majors in stolen bases allowed, with 41. During the season, Young won a National League Pitcher of the Month award, took a no-hitter into the sixth inning or beyond three times, and extended his undefeated road start streak to 24 games. This streak made Young one of only three pitchers in major league history to have gone at least 23 straight road starts without a loss; Allie Reynolds set the record at 25 straight road starts spanning the 1948 and 1949 seasons, with Russ Meyer falling one short, going undefeated in 24 straight road contests spanning the 1953 and 1954 seasons.

In his first six starts after Memorial Day, he improved from a 3–3 with a 4.32 ERA to 7–3 with a 2.97 ERA, by allowing only four earned runs over 38 2/3 innings. He was named one of five candidates from the National League for Major League Baseball's "All-Star Final Vote" to determine the final official selection for the 2006 Major League Baseball All-Star Game; however, Los Angeles Dodgers first baseman Nomar Garciaparra was elected. Nonetheless, his strong June performance – during which he allowed 16 hits and 13 walks over 30 2/3 innings, maintained a 1.17 ERA and struck out 34 – earned him the National League Pitcher of the Month award. His five starts in June were highlighted by a career-best 12-strikeout performance on June 9 against the Florida Marlins and a June 21 win over his former team, the Texas Rangers.

On September 22, Young had a no-hitter through 8 1/3 innings of the game against the Pittsburgh Pirates before pinch hitter Joe Randa hit a two-run home run. This would have been the first no-hitter in Padres history. It was the first time a Padre had taken a no-hitter into the ninth inning since Andy Ashby on September 5, 1997, vs. the Atlanta Braves. Young had been on pace for a perfect game through 5 2/3 innings. Young also took a no-hitter into the eighth inning on May 30 against the Colorado Rockies as a prelude to his June performance. In that game, which marked the first time a pitcher took a no-hitter into the eighth inning during the 2006 season, he surrendered a double to Brad Hawpe, who had been a teammate in the 1997 Connie Mack World Series, on his first pitch of the eighth inning and 99th of the game. During Young's next start on June 4 at Pittsburgh, he did not allow a hit for the first 5 1/3 innings, making him one of only two pitchers (Steve Trachsel – June 20–25, 2002) to have consecutive starts with at least five hitless innings since the 2000 season.

He ended the season by winning his first career postseason start; on October 7, he earned a 3–1 victory in Game 3 of the 2006 National League Division Series against the St. Louis Cardinals. He pitched 6 2/3 shutout innings, struck out nine, walked two and allowed four hits. The Padres lost the series three games to one. Young's 6–0 road performance in 2006 was one of 49 undefeated road seasons with at least five victories by a pitcher since post-season play began in 1903. However, it was the first to be followed by a postseason road victory.

In November, he traveled to Japan to take part in the Major League Baseball Japan All-Star Series. Young was the starter in an exhibition game against the Yomiuri Giants, which was memorable for the major leaguers' three-run ninth-inning rally to earn a tie. This game was the prelude to the five-game series which began with three games at the Tokyo Dome and was followed by games in Osaka and Fukuoka. Young pitched the fourth game of the series. Young also blogged on behalf of mlb.com about daily life during the trip. He detailed visits with United States Ambassador to Japan Tom Schieffer, time in the Harajuku, and travels on the Bullet Train.

==== 2007 ====
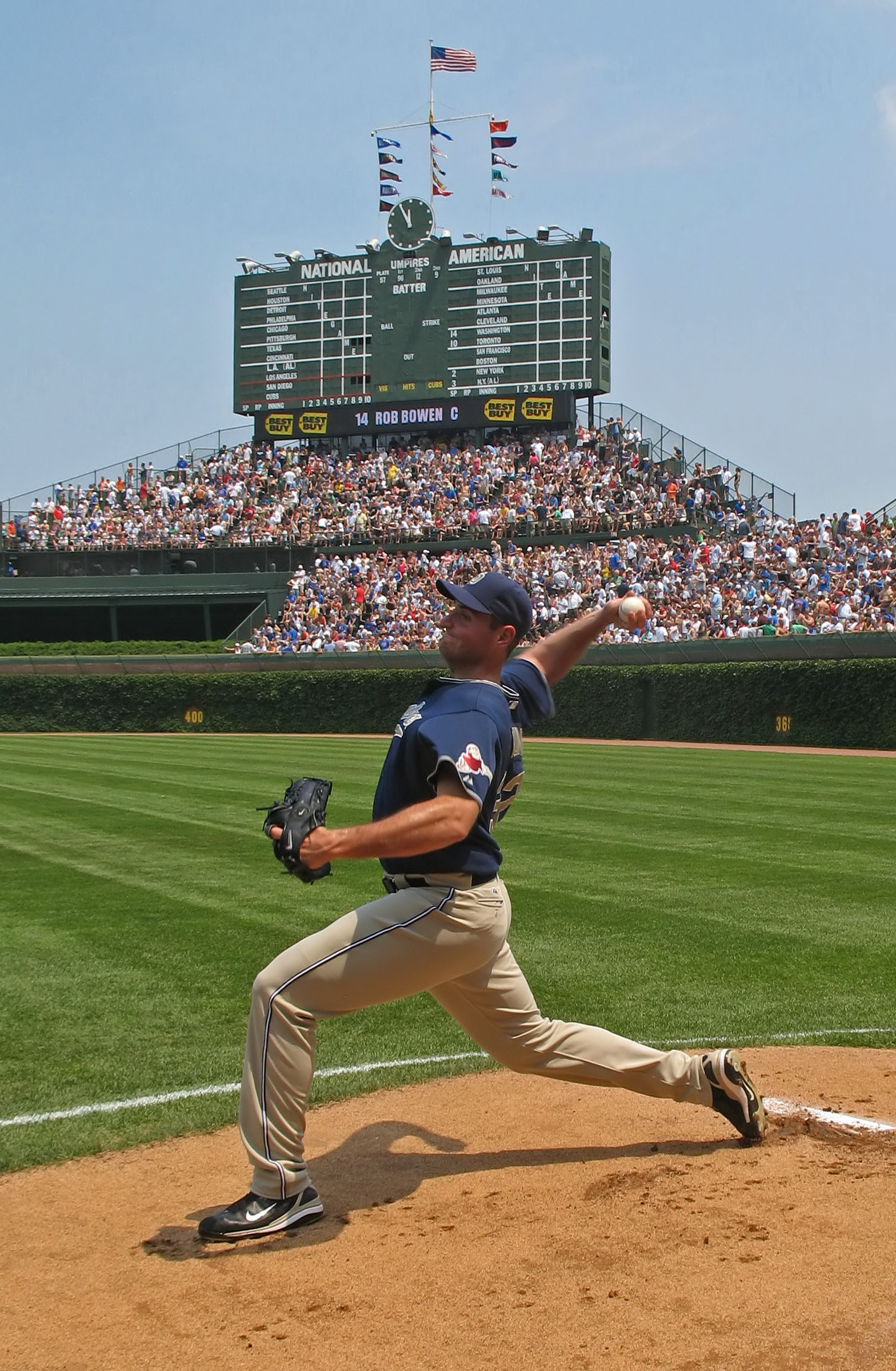
Young throwing a four-seam fastball during pregame warmup at Wrigley Field in Chicago.

In his season debut on April 4 against the San Francisco Giants, Young became the 435th different pitcher to surrender a home run to Barry Bonds when he surrendered Bonds' first of the season and 735th of his career. The game marked Young's 25th consecutive road start without a loss. Young was 9–0 during the streak, which ended in his subsequent road start on April 15 at Dodger Stadium in a 9–3 loss to the Los Angeles Dodgers. The last of the nine other pitchers to go 20 consecutive road starts without a loss was Greg Maddux who went 22 starts without a loss during 1997 and 1998. Young's streak began on June 25, 2005.

On April 10, Young signed a four-year extension with the Padres through the 2010 season, reportedly worth US$14.5 million with a club option for 2011.

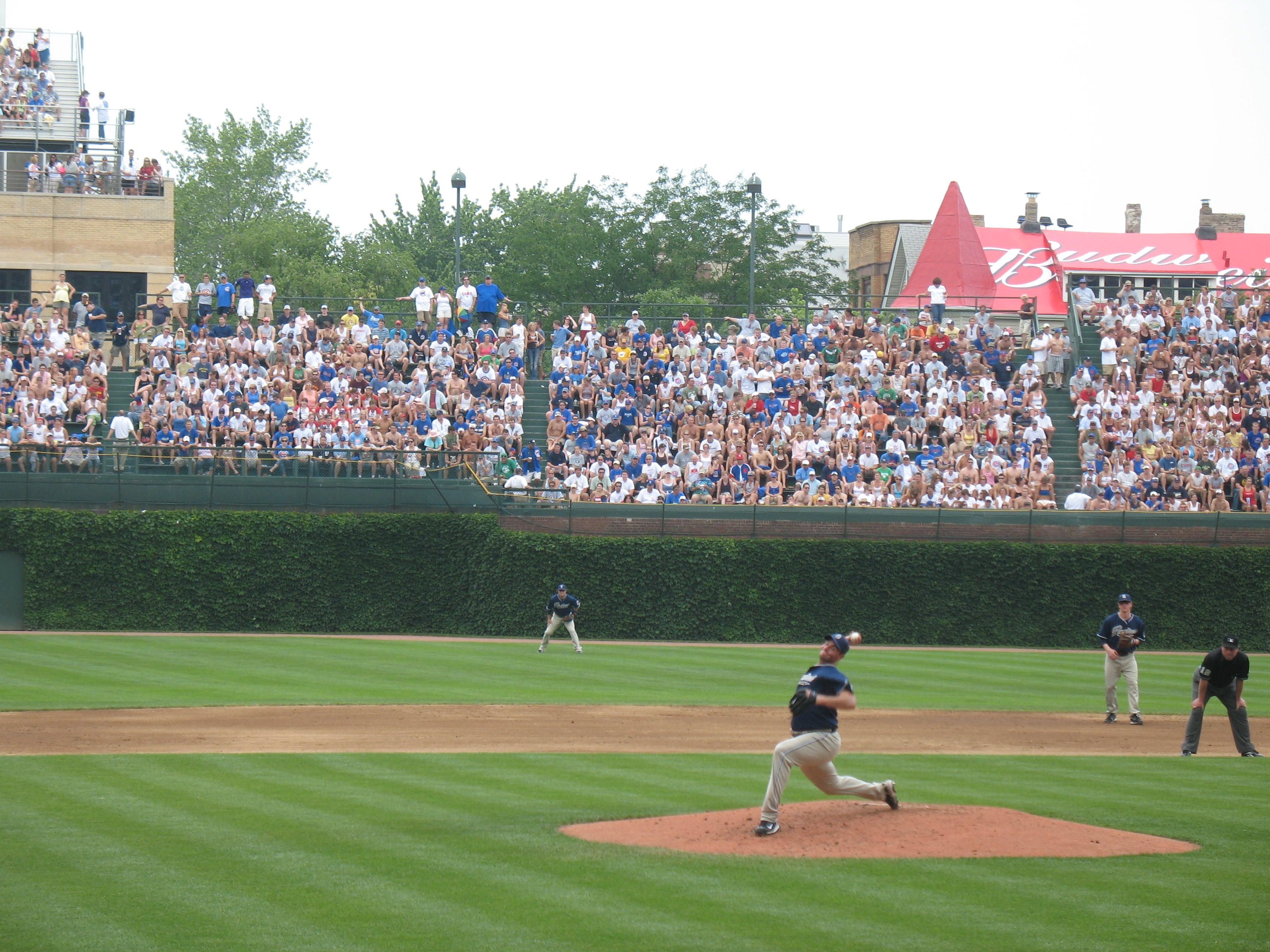
Chris Young during delivery

On June 16, Young threw a pitch that hit Chicago Cubs All-Star first baseman Derrek Lee on the back of the upper left arm. The day before the fracas, Alfonso Soriano homered off David Wells, and the Padres believed Soriano showed poor sportsmanship by admiring and celebrating his home run. The pitch nicked Lee's left hand near his surgically repaired wrist. When the 6 ft 5 in (1.96 m) Lee began walking towards first base, both he and Young, 6 ft 10 in (2.08 m), exchanged words, and a bench-clearing altercation ensued. Both Young and Lee were ejected from the game, along with Jake Peavy and Cubs bench coach Gerald Perry. On June 18, Young and Lee were suspended five games each for their roles in the brawl, and Perry was suspended three games. All suspended parties were fined, as were Peavy and Brian Giles. Young and Lee appealed their suspensions, which were to begin the following day. At the time of the scuffle in the fourth inning, both pitchers were working on no-hitters. Young was ejected in the game, and he earned a no-decision in the game which the Padres ultimately won 1–0.

On June 24, Jake Peavy surrendered three earned runs in five innings, which caused his ERA to rise from 1.98 to 2.14. This gave Young, who had a 2.08 ERA, the National League-leading average for one day. The next day, Brad Penny allowed only one earned run over eight innings to take the lead with a 2.04 ERA.

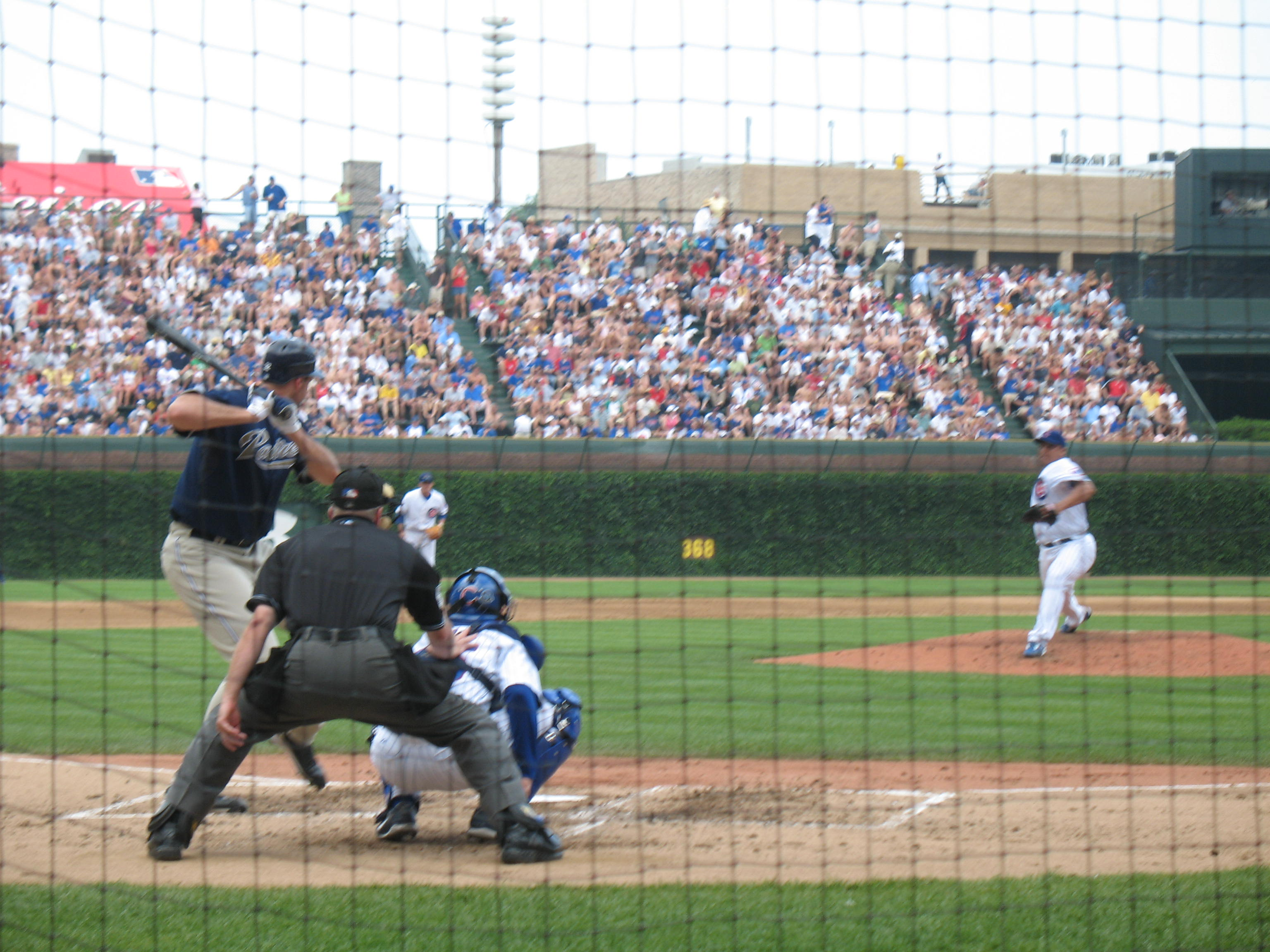
Chris Young batting against Chicago Cubs starting pitcher Carlos Zambrano shortly before the brawl on June 16, 2007

On July 1, Young was nominated as a candidate for the All-Star Final Vote, contending against Tom Gorzelanny, Roy Oswalt, Brandon Webb and Carlos Zambrano. In a bid for the final spot on July 4, Young posted seven scoreless innings in a 1–0 victory over the Florida Marlins to not only retake the National League ERA lead, but also assume the major league lead over Brad Penny by a slim margin (1.9968 to 1.9970). The voting ended on July 5, with Young defeating the four opposing pitchers to earn his first career All-Star Game selection. The selection made Young the sixth Ivy League athlete named to the All-Star team (joining Lou Gehrig, Red Rolfe, Ron Darling, Brad Ausmus and Mike Remlinger).

Young entered the All-Star break with the major league lead in ERA and opponent batting average as well as an undefeated streak extending back to a May 12 loss to the Cardinals. Prior to the announcement of his election, Young dropped his appeal of the five-game suspension. Young served his suspension during the final four games before the All-Star break and the first game afterwards, yet was allowed to play in the All-Star Game at AT&T Park in San Francisco, California. In the fifth inning of the 5–4 American League victory for which Young was the losing pitcher, he surrendered the first inside-the-park home run in All-Star game history to Ichiro Suzuki.

He was placed on the disabled list after he incurred a strained oblique muscle during his July 24 start. On August 9, he was activated off the disabled list to make a scheduled start. He took a 12-start (five-decision) undefeated streak, dating back to a May 12 loss to the Cardinals, into his first start off the disabled list, but he took the loss in a 5–0 defeat, which was again against the Cardinals. Young ended the 2007 season as the major league leader in opponent batting average and hits per nine innings, but also in stolen bases allowed (with 44). He battled injuries late in the season and surrendered the ERA leadership to Jake Peavy in his August 30 start.

==== 2008 ====
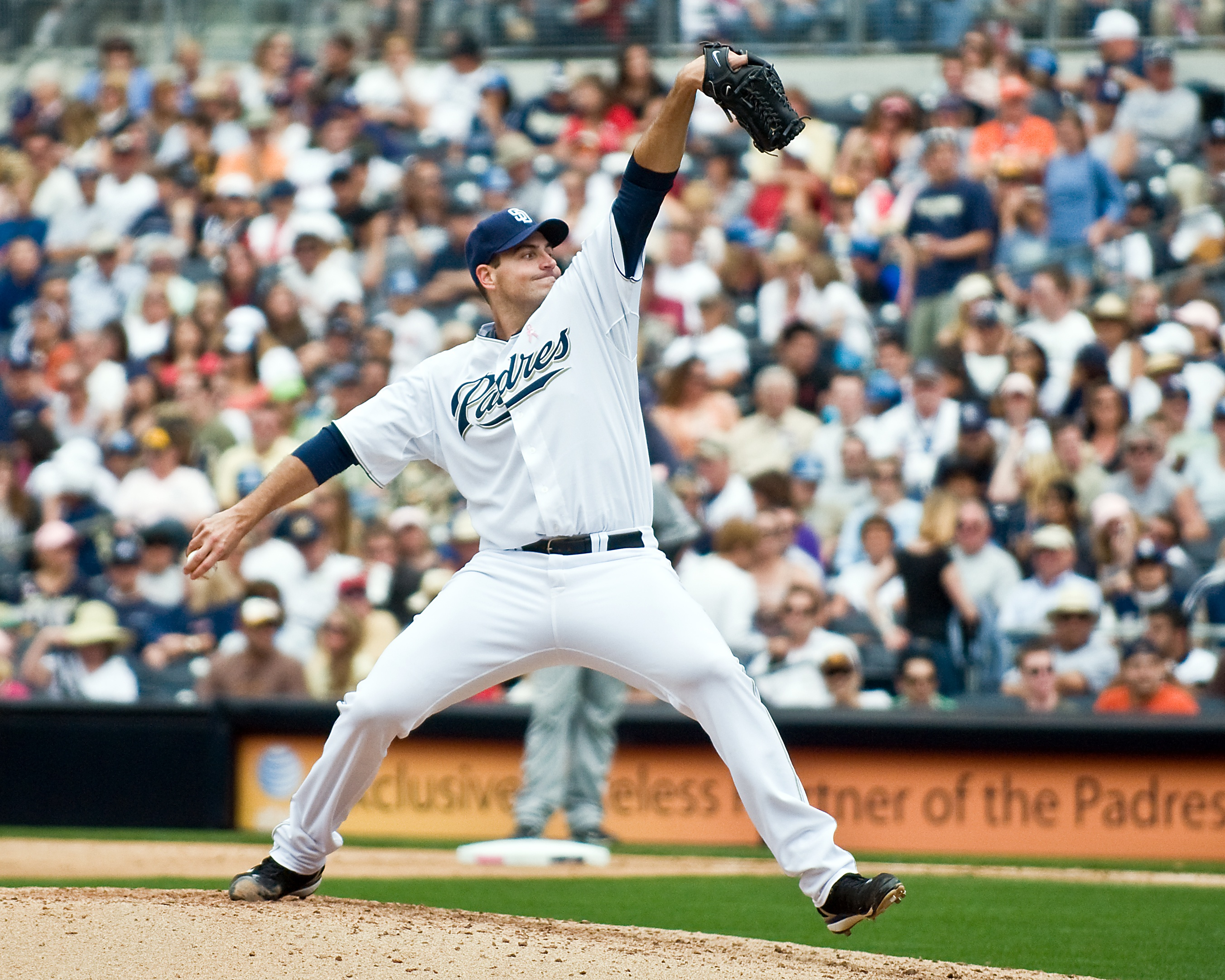
Chris Young pitching against the Rockies on May 11, 2008

Young started the season in the second spot in the Padres rotation between ace Peavy and Maddux. He pitched his first three turns from the second spot in the rotation. On April 18, he missed his turn and Maddux moved into the second spot in the rotation. Young has since been pitching in the third spot in the rotation. The number three spot in the rotation is the only one that was not scheduled to start during the Padres visit to Wrigley Field May 12–15, 2008. Young, thus, did not make a start against the Cubs with whom he had an altercation in 2007. On May 21, 2008, in a game against the St. Louis Cardinals, Young was hit in the face by a line drive from Albert Pujols. Young was sitting on the ground for several minutes but was able to leave the field under his own power as he only sustained a nasal fracture and a laceration on his nose. Later in the same inning, Pujols would also sprain the ankle of Padres catcher Josh Bard while sliding into home plate. Young returned to the mound on July 29 with five shutout innings against the Arizona Diamondbacks. Young then did not pitch between August 10 and September 1 due to another disabled list stint and returned to the lineup to take the loss in a game where Greg Maddux, who had become a Los Angeles Dodger, earned his 354th victory to tie Roger Clemens for eighth on the all-time list.

Then, on September 7 he came within four outs of perfection when Milwaukee Brewers' Gabe Kapler hit a one-out home run in the eighth inning. He allowed two hits, did not walk a batter and struck out five, en route to 10–1 victory at Milwaukee's Miller Park. Young did not get his first perfect game or first no-hitter, but he did end up with the first complete game of his career after 114 starts. Two starts later he hit his first home run as a major league batter.

==== 2009 ====
After starting the season with a 4–2 record, Young lost his last four starts before spending the remainder of the season on the disabled list. His final start occurred on June 14. He was initially placed on the 15-day disabled list on June 19, but on July 31 he was transferred to the 60-day disabled list. In August, he had season ending arthroscopic surgery to repair partial tears in his labrum. He had been disabled with shoulder inflammation. For the 2009 season, he was 4–6 with a 5.21 ERA.

==== 2010 ====
Young pitched six shutout innings in the second game of the season before being pulled with a right shoulder strain. He missed almost the entire season except for three starts near the end of the season, finishing the season 2–0 with a 0.90 ERA. In November, the Padres declined to pick up the option for 2011.

In 2010, he was chosen as the eighth-smartest athlete in sports by Sporting News. He became a free agent following the season.

=== New York Mets (2011–2012) ===
==== 2011 ====
On January 17, 2011, Young signed a contract with the New York Mets worth $1.1 million with the ability to reach up to $4.5 million through incentives. In his first career start with the Mets on April 5, 2011, Young went five and a third innings while striking out seven batters, recording the victory in a 7–1 Mets win over the Philadelphia Phillies. He also went three for three at the plate with two runs batted in against Phillies starter Cole Hamels. In that game, Young became the first Mets pitcher in team history to record two hits in a single inning. Shortly after the start of the season, Young sustained an arm injury which forced him to miss the remainder of the 2011 season on the disabled list. Following the season, he was a free agent.

==== 2012 ====
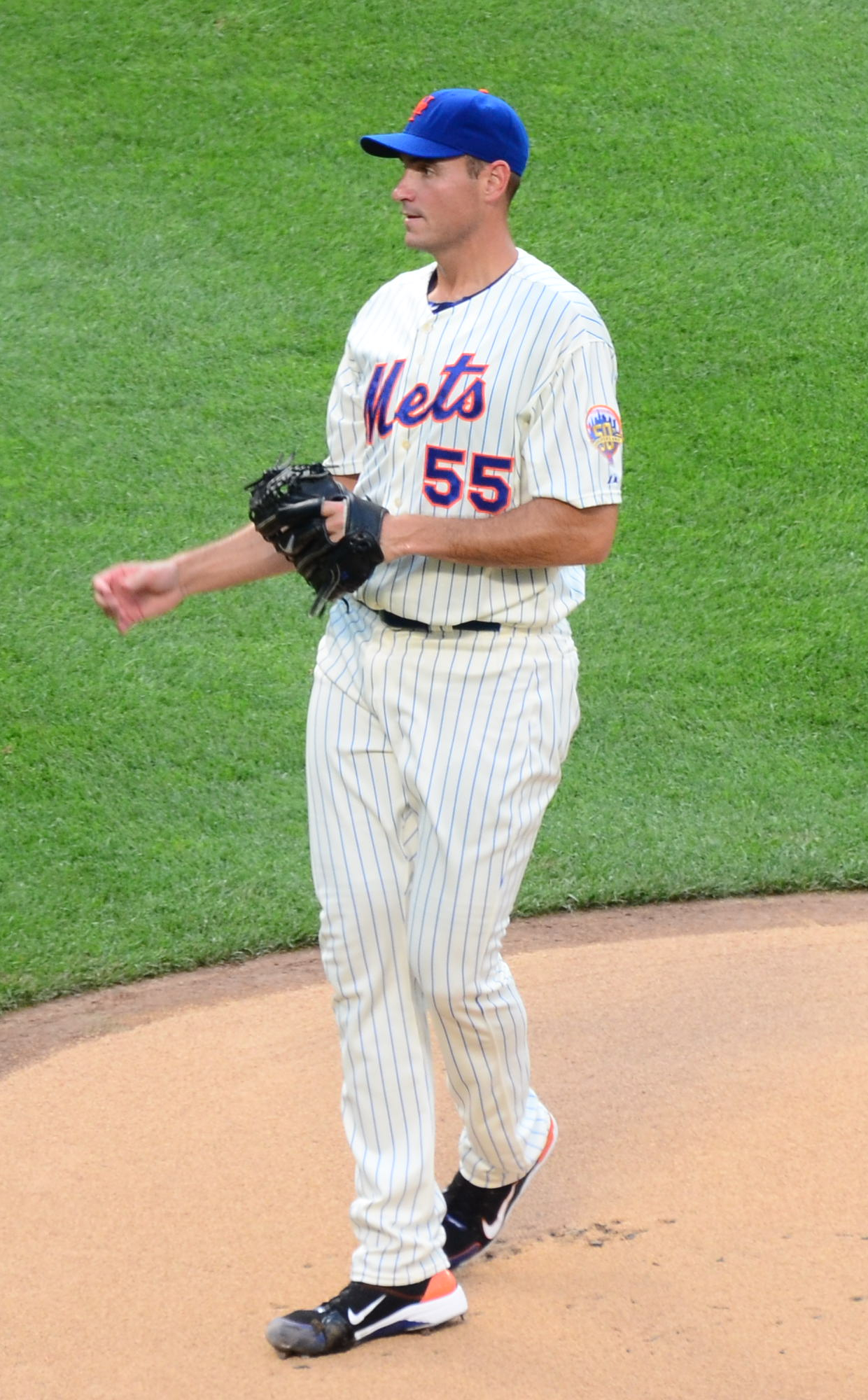
Young during his tenure with the New York Mets in 2012

On March 26, 2012, Young signed on a minor league deal with the Mets. He had recently undergone surgery to repair a torn anterior capsule in his right shoulder. He spent the first 33 days of the season on the triple A Buffalo Bisons' disabled list before being activated on May 10. Young subsequently made three starts with the single A St. Lucie Mets on May 11, May 16 and 25 before being promoted back to Buffalo on May 27. He compiled a 1–0 record with 3.18 ERA in 17.0 innings during the three starts. On May 31, he pitched 6 scoreless innings for the Bisons against the Columbus Clippers. The Mets announced on June 4 that they would call Young up to the major league roster on June 5. On June 5, 2012, Young made his return against the Washington Nationals at Nationals Park with the Mets, giving up 3 runs (2 earned) over 5 innings in a game that was eventually decided in 12 innings. On June 6 his wife gave birth and he was placed on a paternity leave, which was not intended to interfere with his June 10 scheduled start. The move was for the purpose of freeing up a roster spot during Young's off days under a Major League Baseball rule that allows for a three-day leave. Young made his next start on June 12 against the Tampa Bay Rays, earning his first win in over a year. He became a free agent following the season.

=== Washington Nationals ===
On February 21, 2013, Young signed a minor league deal with the Washington Nationals and an invitation to training camp. On March 26, 2013, he was granted his unconditional release by the Nationals after opting out of his contract. He was re-signed by the Nationals on April 4, 2013. He was then assigned to Triple-A Syracuse. He made his season debut on April 23 against Rochester, giving up 6 runs in 4.2 innings. He made 6 additional starts before going on the disabled list with a neck injury on May 28, 2 days after leaving a start against Columbus after the first inning. He made 2 starts at the end of the year in the Gulf Coast League and with Short-Season Auburn before the end of the injury-marred season. In 9 total starts, he went 1–2 with a 6.81 ERA, striking out 21 in 37 innings. After experiencing pain in his shoulder and neck, he had surgery to repair what was diagnosed as thoracic outlet syndrome. This condition is a nerve problem that puts pressure on a pitcher's shoulder. On November 19, 2013, Young re-signed with the Nationals on a minor league deal. He was released on March 25, 2014.

=== Seattle Mariners (2014) ===
==== 2014 ====
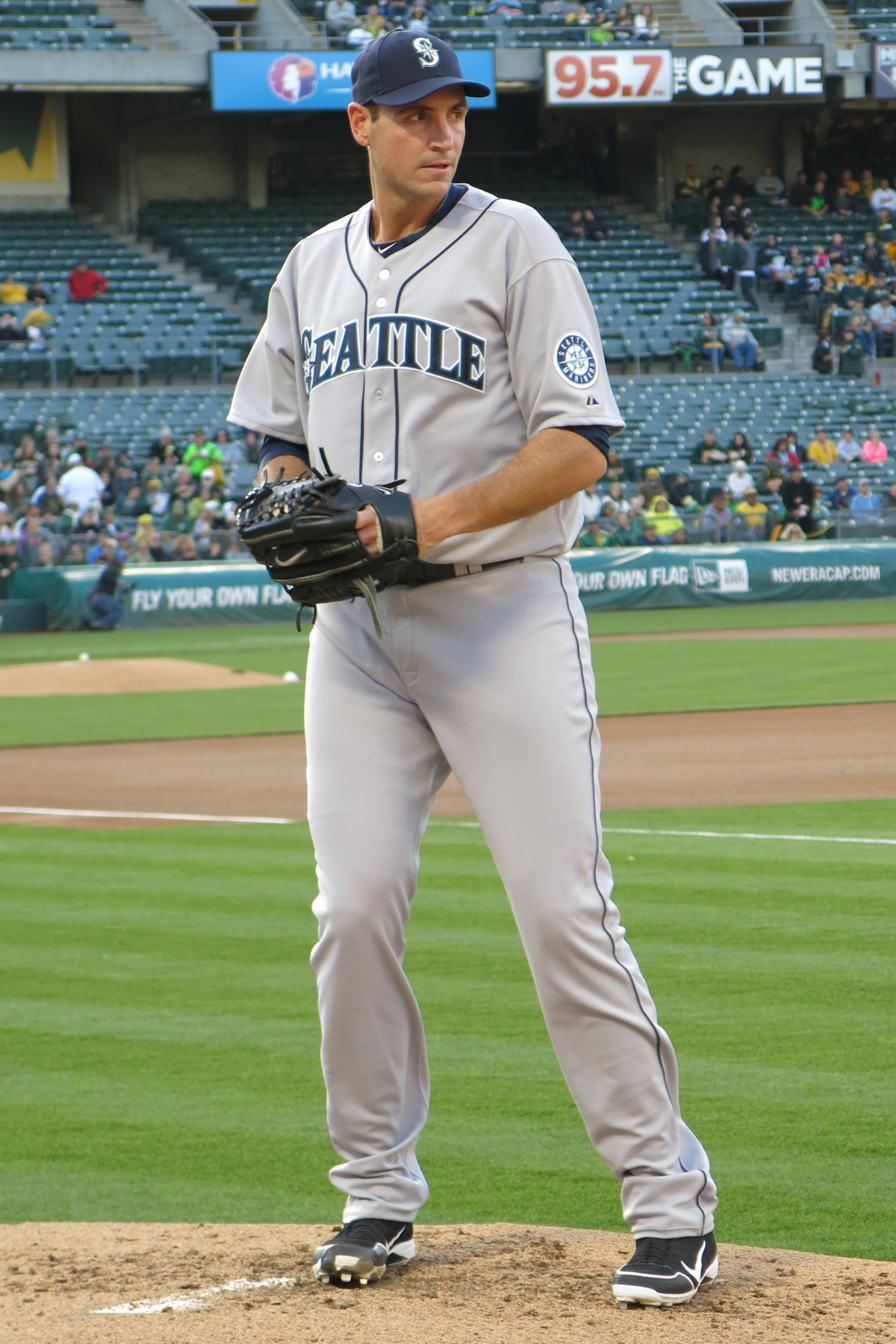
Young pitching for the Seattle Mariners in 2014

On March 27, 2014, Young signed a highly incentivized one-year deal with the Seattle Mariners. Young was scheduled to debut as a starter for the Mariners on April 4. However, the Oakland Coliseum had its first rainout since 1998. As a result, after 159 Major League starts and 102 Minor League starts, Young made his first appearance as a relief pitcher (other than the 2007 All-Star Game) and he pitched two shutout innings on April 6 against the Oakland A's later in that series. He made his first Major League start since September 9, 2012 on April 13 against Oakland. He posted six scoreless innings, while scattering 4 hits and 3 walks. By early June, Young was in the conversation for Major League Baseball Comeback Player of the Year Award, with a 5–2 start and 3.27 ERA, according to MLB.com's Adam Lewis. In helping to stabilize a rotation battered by injuries and ineffectual fifth starters, Mariners manager Lloyd McClendon praised the right-hander at the time, calling him a "godsend". Young finished the season with a 12–9 record and a 3.65 ERA in 29 starts. His 7.8 hits per nine innings was the sixth in the AL. Following the season, Young was recognized with the Major League Baseball Comeback Player of the Year Award, The Sporting News American League Comeback Player of the Year Award, and Players Choice Comeback Player of the Year Award. At the conclusion of the season, Young became a free agent.

=== Kansas City Royals (2015–2017) ===
==== 2015 ====
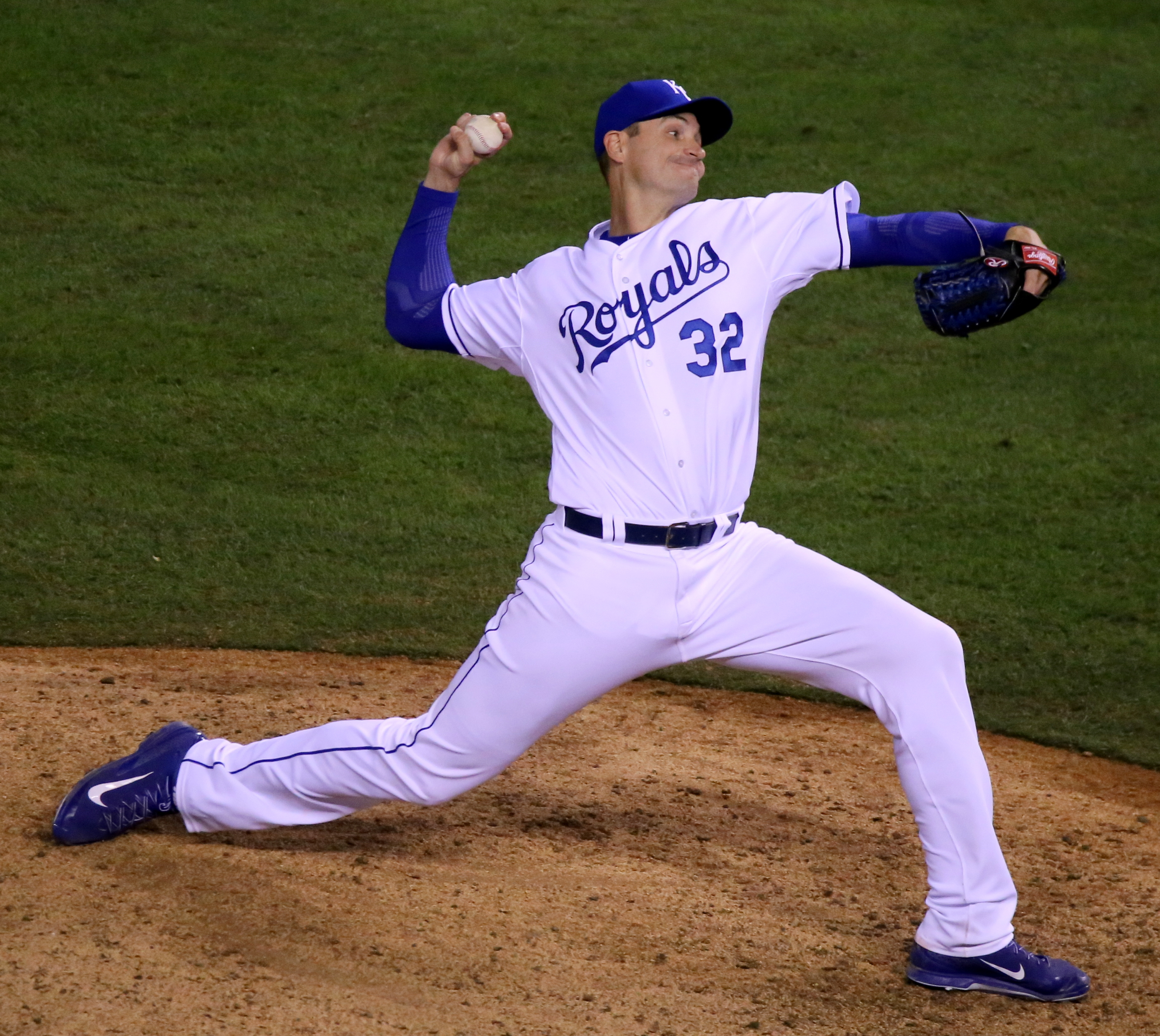
Young pitching for the Kansas City Royals in the 2015 World Series

On March 7, 2015, Young signed with the Kansas City Royals. Young entered the season in the long reliever role with the Royals. He appeared in the Royals' sixth game on April 12 against the Los Angeles Angels with two scoreless innings as the Royals started the season 6–0. Young made his first start with the Royals on May 1. He tossed five no-hit innings against the Detroit Tigers. On June 16, Young posted 7 shutout innings and 3 runs batted in against the Milwaukee Brewers, becoming the first Royals pitcher to tally 3 RBI in a game since 1972. After achieving a record of 8–6 with a 3.25 ERA through the end of July, Young was returned to the bullpen on July 31 after posting a 5.11 ERA over a 5-game stretch. On September 27 (one day after his father died), Young made his first start since July 28 and pitched 5 no-hit innings against the Cleveland Indians. On October 20, Young started and pitched 4 2/3 innings in a game 4 victory in the 2015 American League Championship Series against the Toronto Blue Jays. It was Young's first postseason start since the 2006 National League Division Series. He earned the win in the October 27 game 1 of the 2015 World Series when he shut down the New York Mets, giving up a walk and no hits while striking out 4 over the final three innings, to help the Royals win 5–4 in 14 innings.

==== 2016 ====
On December 7, 2015, the Royals announced that they had signed Young to a two-year $11.75 million contract with mutual third-year option. After beginning the 2016 season with a record of 1–5 in 7 starts, Young was placed on the disabled list with a strained right forearm from May 12 to 28. After his DL stint, Young continued to serve the Royals as a swingman out of the bullpen, finishing the season appearing in 34 games, 13 starts. He was 3–9 and registered a 6.19 ERA, his highest ERA over a full season to that point in his career. He also tied a career high by allowing 28 home runs, and gave up a career-high 10.6 hits per 9 innings.

==== 2017 ====
Young began the 2017 season in the bullpen, making his final two MLB starts in May, both lasting fewer than four innings. He was 0–0 with a 7.50 ERA in 14 games. On June 23, Young was designated for assignment by the Royals and immediately released.

=== San Diego Padres ===
On December 29, 2017, Young signed a minor league contract with the Padres. He was released on March 31, 2018.

== Post-playing career ==
=== Major League Baseball ===
Young moved into administration effective May 14, 2018 as the vice president, on-field operations, initiatives & strategy under MLB chief baseball officer Joe Torre, reporting directly to senior vice president, on-field operations Peter Woodfork.

In May 2018, Young became an MLB executive when he was promoted to serve as vice president of on-field operations, initiatives and strategy. In February 2020, Young was promoted to senior vice president to replace Joe Torre as the MLB's enforcer of discipline action, such as deciding fines and suspensions. He also oversaw the On-Field Operations and Umpiring Departments.

=== Texas Rangers (2020–present) ===
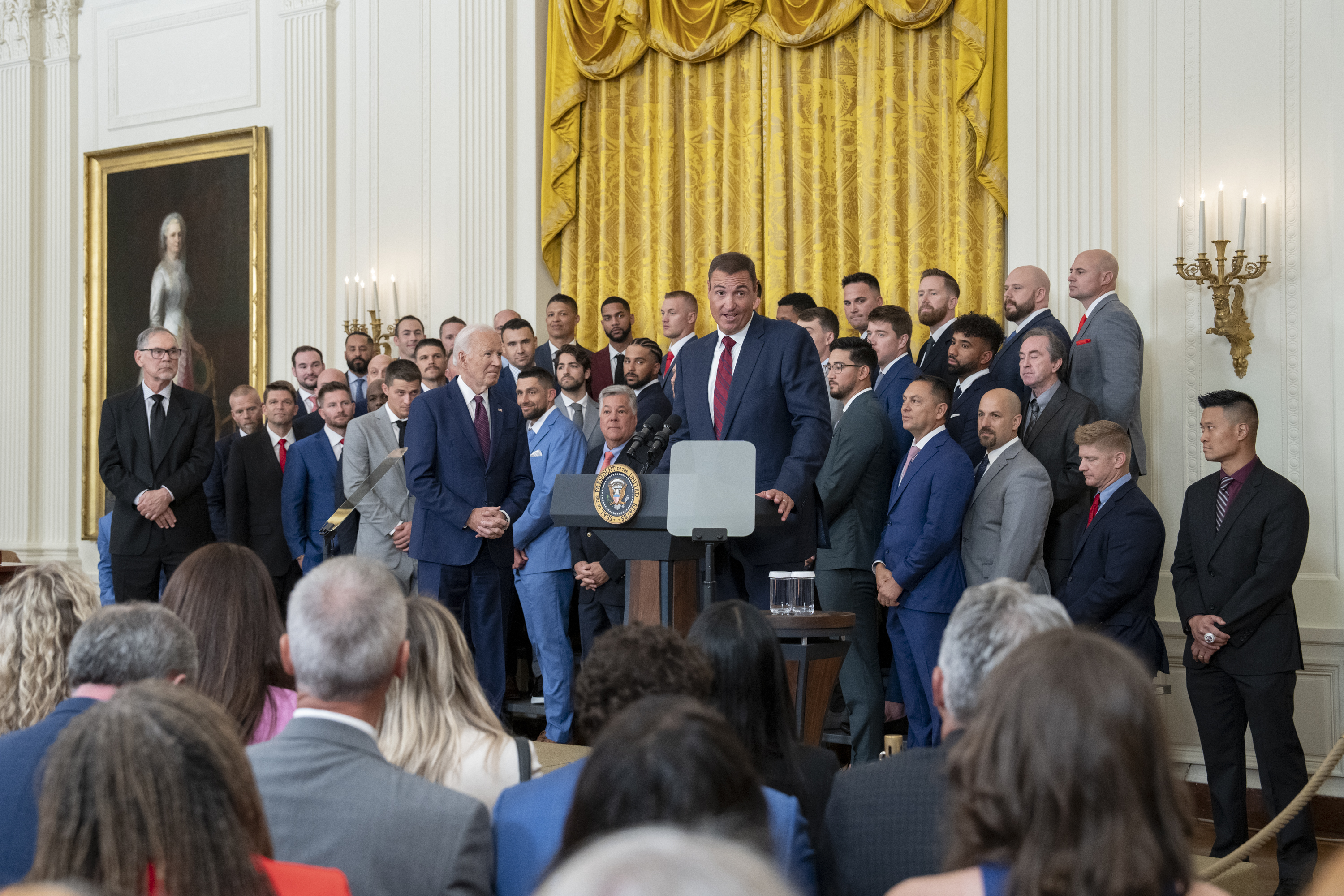
Young speaking at the White House with the Rangers in 2024

On December 4, 2020, Young was named general manager of the Texas Rangers, succeeding Jon Daniels. Under Young's general managership, the Rangers slowly became championship contenders culminating in the Rangers winning the 2023 World Series against the Arizona Diamondbacks in 5 games.

On September 13, 2024, Young and the Rangers agreed to a multi–year contract extension. In addition, Young was given the additional title of President of Baseball Operations.

== Player profile ==
=== Pitching style ===
Young was not a traditional power pitcher. He was said to be a control pitcher in a 6 feet 10 inches (2.08 m) power pitcher's body—his pitching style was more like Greg Maddux's than that of five-time Cy Young Award winner Randy Johnson, who is the same height as Young. Young was traded three times partly because of the low velocity of his fastball, which was in the 83–87 miles per hour (133.6–140 km/h) range. Young learned how to use precise location to make his fastball effective. He had also been compared to another control pitcher, Jim Palmer, because Young similarly induced popups and fly ball outs with deceptive late movement on his high fastballs. Over 50% of the balls put in play against him were fly balls. Of the flyballs hit off Young in 2007, 3.8% were home runs. while the average was about 11%. From 2003 to 2006 the best single-season percentage was 6.2% by Dontrelle Willis in 2005.

Young's mid-2000s repertoire included fastballs, curveballs, sliders and changeups. His curveball was a slow curveball and his 85 miles per hour (137 km/h) fastball was described by former teammate and catcher Mike Piazza as having late life and late movement that seemed to jump. His curveball was used to keep the hitters off balance so that they did not jump on his low-velocity fastball. Former Ranger pitching coach Orel Hershiser said Young had the ability to throw his fastball to all locations effectively which gave him a chance at success. Hershiser described Young's pitches as sneaky fast because his methodical delivery and size gave him deception. This delivery also left him susceptible to stolen bases due to the relatively long time it took for him to deliver a pitch from the stretch. By 2012, nearly all of his pitches were fastballs or sliders.

=== Batting ===
Throughout his career, Young had a career .150 batting average, including 31 hits, eight of which were extra base hits (six doubles, one triple, and one home run). He never recorded a stolen base. Only a handful of former Princeton players have hit a major league home run. Before Young's home run in 2008, Moe Berg had been the last Princeton alumnus to hit one (1939).

== Personal life ==
Young's wife, Elizabeth Patrick, is the great-granddaughter of Lester Patrick, who was the namesake of the National Hockey League's Patrick Division and the Lester Patrick Trophy. Her father is Dick Patrick, the president of the Washington Capitals and a minority owner. Her brother is Chris Patrick, the team’s general manager. She also graduated from Princeton in 2002 and attended law school in Washington, D.C. The couple have three children.

== See also ==
- List of people from Dallas
- List of Princeton University people
- List of World Series starting pitchers
- San Diego Padres award winners and league leaders

Achievements
Preceded by Roger Clemens	NL hits per nine innings 2006, 2007	Succeeded by Tim Lincecum
Preceded by Roger Clemens	MLB hits per nine innings 2006, 2007	Succeeded by Daisuke Matsuzaka
Preceded by Roger Clemens	NL opponent batting average 2006, 2007	Succeeded by Tim Lincecum
Preceded by Roger Clemens	MLB opponent batting average 2006, 2007	Succeeded by Daisuke Matsuzaka
Preceded by Jon Daniels	Texas Rangers General Manager; 2020–present	Succeeded by Incumbent
Preceded by Jon Daniels	Texas Rangers President of Baseball Operations; 2024–present	Succeeded by Incumbent
