= List of Washington Capitals general managers =

The Washington Capitals are a professional ice hockey team based in Washington, D.C.The team is a member of the Metropolitan Division of the Eastern Conference of the National Hockey League (NHL). The Capitals played at the Capital Centre from their inaugural season in 1974 to 1997, when they moved to the MCI Center, now known as the Capital One Arena. The franchise has had six general managers since their inception.

== Key ==
Key of terms and definitions
Term	Definition
No.	Number of general managers^{[a]}
Ref(s)	References
–	Does not apply
†	Elected to the Hockey Hall of Fame in the Builder category

== General managers ==
General managers of the Washington Capitals
No.	Name	Tenure	Accomplishments during this term	Ref(s)
1	Milt Schmidt	April 20, 1973 – December 29, 1975	No playoff appearances	
2	Max McNab	December 30, 1975 – November 5, 1981	No playoff appearances	
3	Roger Crozier (interim)	November 5, 1981 – August 27, 1982	No playoff appearances	
4	David Poile†	August 30, 1982 – May 12, 1997	1 division title and 14 playoff appearances	
5	George McPhee	June 9, 1997 – April 26, 2014	1 Stanley Cup Final appearance (1998); Won Presidents' Trophy (2009–10); 1 conference title, 7 division titles, and 10 playoff appearances	
6	Brian MacLellan	May 26, 2014 – July 8, 2024	Won Stanley Cup (2018); Won Presidents' Trophy twice (2015–16, 2016–17); 1 conference title, 5 division titles, and 9 playoff appearances	
7	Chris Patrick	July 8, 2024 – present		

== See also ==
- List of NHL general managers

== Notes ==
- ^{a} A running total of the number of general managers of the franchise. Thus any general manager who has two or more separate terms as general manager is only counted once.
