= Brian MacLellan =

Canadian ice hockey player

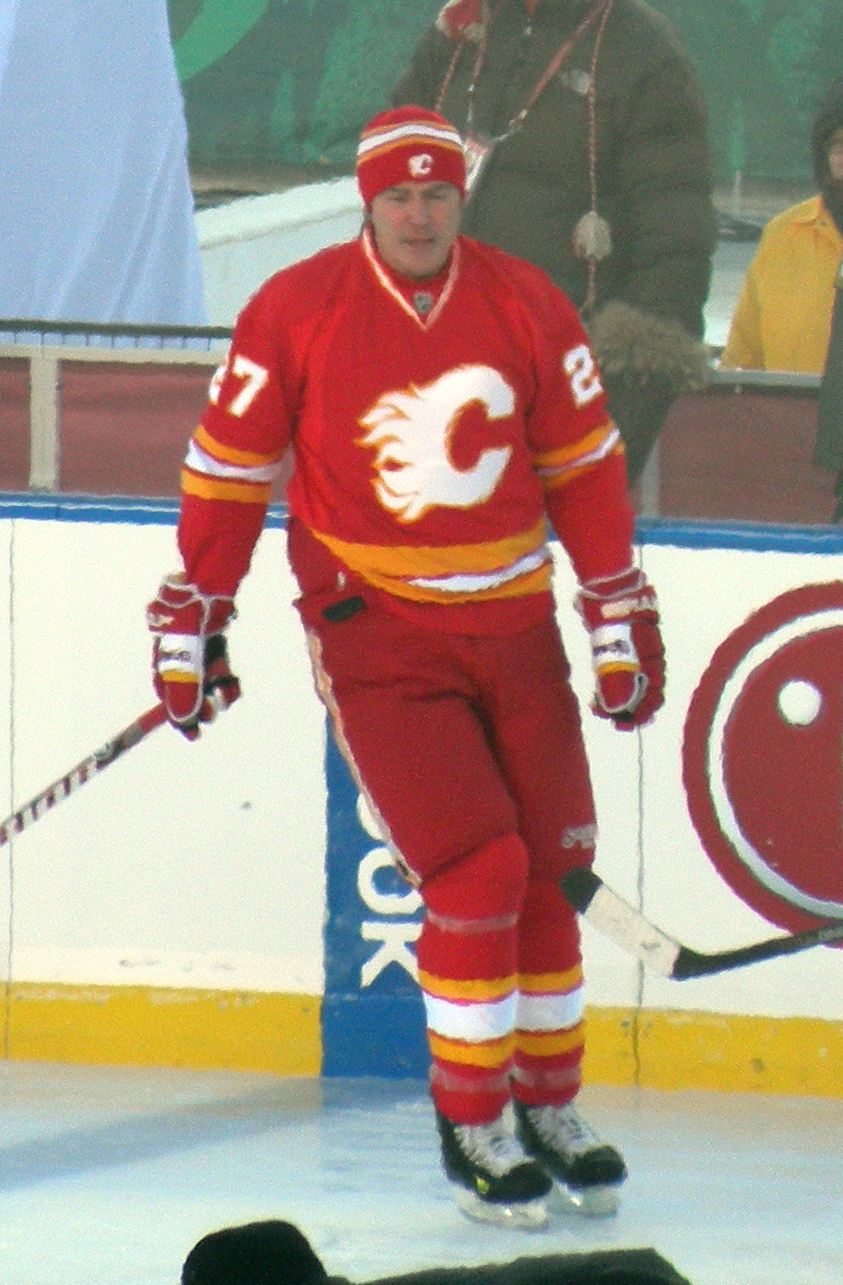
- MacLellan in 2011
- Born: October 27, 1958 (age 67) Guelph, Ontario, Canada
- Height: 6 ft 3 in (191 cm)
- Weight: 220 lb (100 kg; 15 st 10 lb)
- Position: Left wing
- Shot: Left
- Played for: Los Angeles Kings; New York Rangers; Minnesota North Stars; Calgary Flames; Detroit Red Wings
- National team: Canada
- NHL draft: Undrafted
- Playing career: 1982–1992

Brian John MacLellan (born October 27, 1958) is a Canadian former ice hockey forward and current president of hockey operations of the Washington Capitals. He played in the National Hockey League (NHL) with five teams between 1983 and 1992, winning the Stanley Cup in 1989 with the Calgary Flames. Internationally he played for the Canadian national team at the 1985 World Championships. He joined Washington front office in 2000 and spent 13 seasons in various roles before becoming general manager in 2014, and in 2018 won the Stanley Cup with the team.

== Playing career ==
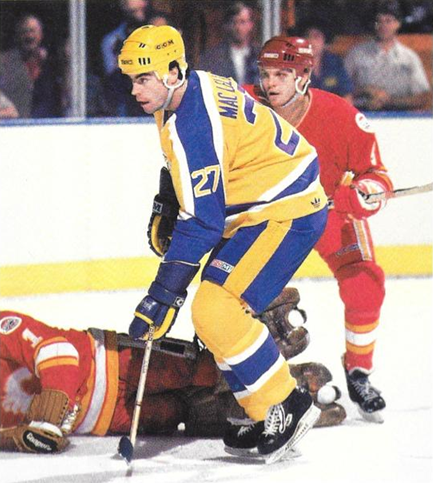
MacLellan in 1984 card depicting him in action for Los Angeles Kings against Calgary Flames

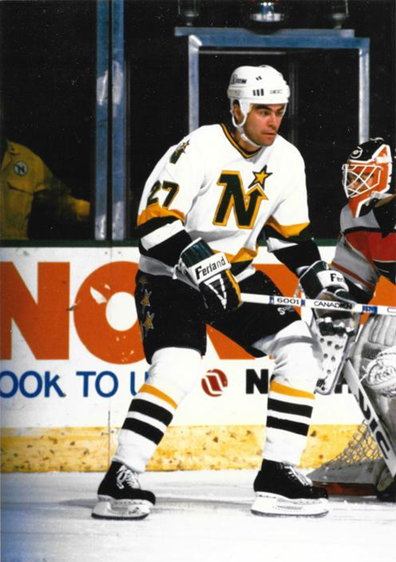
1988 postcard of MacLellan for Minnesota North Stars

MacLellan was born in Guelph, Ontario. After playing his college hockey at Bowling Green State University, MacLellan signed as a free agent with the Los Angeles Kings in 1982. During his tenure with the Kings, he would play on a line with Marcel Dionne, and he would have his best year statistically in 1984–85 (31 goals, 54 assists). Despite this, he was traded to the New York Rangers in the middle of the 1985–86 NHL season. He would be traded again, this time to the Minnesota North Stars prior to the 1986–87 NHL season, where he would score a career-high 32 goals.

Near the end of the 1988–89 NHL season, MacLellan was acquired by the Calgary Flames for their playoff drive, which paid off as the Flames won the Stanley Cup. He would remain with the Flames for two more seasons. He would close out his NHL career playing with the Detroit Red Wings for the 1991–92 season.

== Post-playing career ==
On May 26, 2014, MacLellan was named senior vice president and general manager of the Washington Capitals. MacLellan had been a fixture in Washington for the previous 13 seasons, serving first as a pro scout, then as director of player personnel and, for the seven seasons prior to being named the general manager, as assistant general manager under George McPhee. MacLellan and McPhee had been childhood friends and teammates in Guelph, Ontario and also college teammates at Bowling Green. The Washington Capitals won the Stanley Cup under MacLellan in 2018.

Following the 2023–24 season, MacLellan was succeeded as general manager of the Capitals by Chris Patrick, while retaining his role as president of hockey operations.

== Career statistics ==
=== Regular season and playoffs ===
			Regular season					Playoffs
Season	Team	League	GP	G	A	Pts	PIM	GP	G	A	Pts	PIM
1978–79	Bowling Green State University	CCHA	44	34	29	63	94	—	—	—	—	—
1979–80	Bowling Green State University	CCHA	38	8	15	23	46	—	—	—	—	—
1980–81	Bowling Green State University	CCHA	37	11	14	25	96	—	—	—	—	—
1981–82	Bowling Green State University	CCHA	41	11	21	32	109	—	—	—	—	—
1982–83	Los Angeles Kings	NHL	8	0	3	3	7	—	—	—	—	—
1982–83	New Haven Nighthawks	AHL	71	11	15	26	40	12	5	3	8	4
1983–84	Los Angeles Kings	NHL	72	25	29	54	45	—	—	—	—	—
1983–84	New Haven Nighthawks	AHL	2	0	2	2	0	—	—	—	—	—
1984–85	Los Angeles Kings	NHL	80	31	54	85	53	3	0	1	1	0
1985–86	Los Angeles Kings	NHL	27	5	8	13	19	—	—	—	—	—
1985–86	New York Rangers	NHL	51	11	21	32	47	16	2	4	6	15
1986–87	Minnesota North Stars	NHL	76	32	31	63	69	—	—	—	—	—
1987–88	Minnesota North Stars	NHL	75	16	32	48	74	—	—	—	—	—
1988–89	Minnesota North Stars	NHL	60	16	23	39	104	—	—	—	—	—
1988–89	Calgary Flames	NHL	12	2	3	5	14	21	3	2	5	19
1989–90	Calgary Flames	NHL	65	20	18	38	26	6	0	2	2	8
1990–91	Calgary Flames	NHL	57	13	14	27	55	1	0	0	0	0
1991–92	Detroit Red Wings	NHL	23	1	5	6	38	—	—	—	—	—
NHL totals			606	172	241	413	551	47	5	9	14	42

=== International ===
Year	Team	Event	GP	G	A	Pts	PIM
1985	Canada	WC	4	0	0	0	0
Senior totals			4	0	0	0	0

== Awards and honours ==
Award	Year	References
All-CCHA First Team	1981-82	
AHCA West All-American	1981–82	
Stanley Cup champion	1989 (as player); 2018 (as GM)	

Sporting positions
Preceded by George McPhee	General manager of the Washington Capitals; 2014–2024	Succeeded by Chris Patrick
