= List of New York Rangers head coaches =

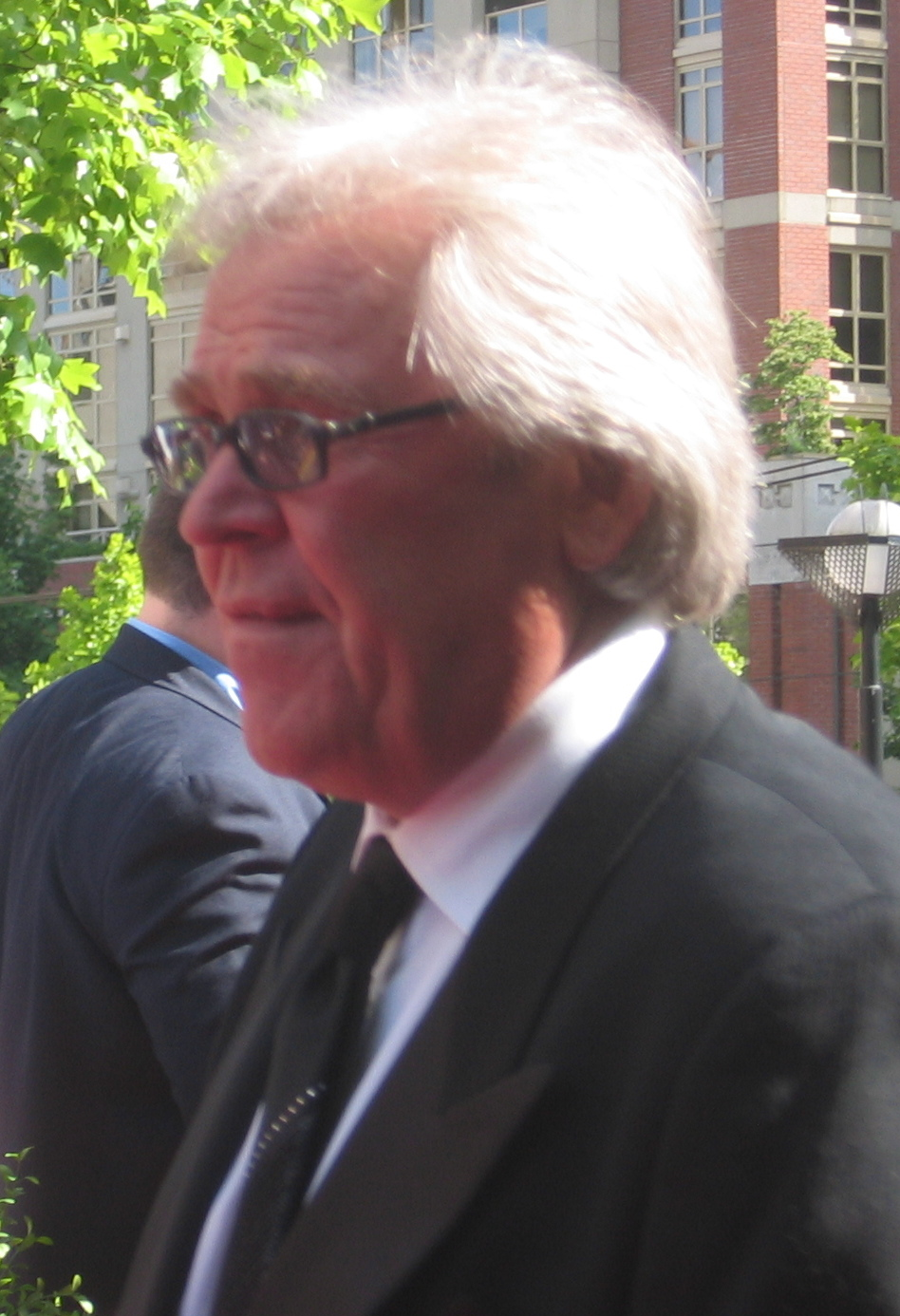
Glen Sather coached the Rangers for 90 games between 2003 and 2004.

The New York Rangers are a professional ice hockey team based in New York City. They are members of the Metropolitan Division of the Eastern Conference of the National Hockey League (NHL). Playing their home games at Madison Square Garden, the Rangers are one of the oldest teams in the NHL, having joined in 1926 as an expansion franchise, and are part of the group of teams referred to as the Original Six. The Rangers were the first NHL franchise in the United States to win the Stanley Cup, which they have done four times (most recently in 1994). The team is commonly referred to by its famous nickname, "The Broadway Blueshirts", or more commonly in New York media, as simply the "Blueshirts".

There have been thirty-seven head coaches for the Rangers, the first one being Lester Patrick, and the most recent being Peter Laviolette. Muzz Patrick, Alfred Pike, and Ron Smith are the only coaches who spent their entire careers with the Rangers and were not elected to the Hockey Hall of Fame. Bernie Geoffrion, Lynn Patrick, Emile Francis, Glen Sather, Craig Patrick, Roger Neilson, Herb Brooks, and Fred Shero have all been inducted to the Hockey Hall of Fame. Lester Patrick, Frank Boucher, Colin Campbell, Neil Colville, Bill Cook, Phil Esposito, Doug Harvey, and Bryan Trottier have all coached the Rangers for their entire coaching careers and have been elected to the Hockey Hall of Fame. Emile Francis has coached the most regular season games, 654, and the most playoff games, 75, in franchise history. Emile Francis also holds the franchise records in regular season wins, 342, and playoff wins, 34. Mike Keenan, the twenty-fifth head coach of the Rangers, amassed the best points percentage, .667, and regular season winning percentage, .619, having done so in a single, 84-game season. Keenan is also the only head coach to have coached the Rangers to a Presidents' Trophy and Stanley Cup in the same season. Lester Patrick is the only head coach to have coached the Rangers to multiple Stanley Cups. Under head coach Peter Laviolette the Rangers set franchise records in wins (55) and points (114) in a single season, having set both records in the 2023–24 season. The Jack Adams Award has never been awarded to the head coach of the New York Rangers.

== Key ==
Key of terms and definitions
Term	Definition
#	Number of coaches^{[A]}
GC	Games coached
W	Wins
L	Losses
T	Ties (applicable until the 2003–04 NHL season)
OTL	Overtime/shootout losses (shootouts applicable since the 2005–06 NHL season)
P%	Points percentage
W%	Winning percentage
*	Elected to the Hockey Hall of Fame
†	Spent entire professional head coaching career with the Rangers
*†	Spent entire NHL head coaching career with the Rangers and also elected to the Hockey Hall of Fame

== Coaches ==
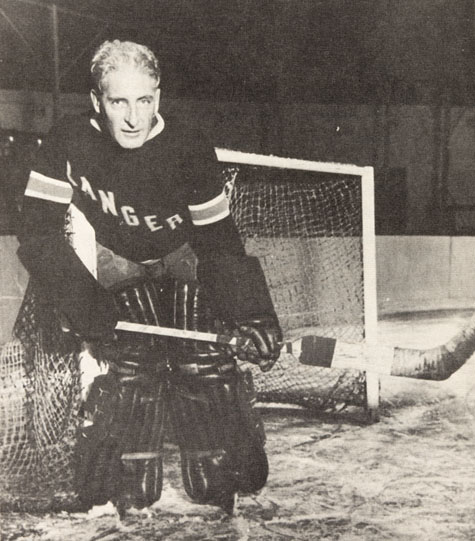
Lester Patrick, the first coach of the Rangers, coached the team his entire career and was inducted to the Hockey Hall of Fame.

Note: Statistics are correct through the 2025–26 season.

Head coaches of the New York Rangers NHL franchise
#	Name	Term	Regular season						Playoffs				Achievements	Note
#	Name	Term	GC	W	L	T	OTL	P%	GC	W	L	T	Achievements	Note
1	Lester Patrick*†	1926–1939	604	281	216	107	—	.554	65	31	26	8	Stanley Cup champions (1928, 1933)	
2	Frank Boucher*†	1939–1948	487	167	243	77	—	.422	27	13	14	0	Stanley Cup champions (1940)	
3	Lynn Patrick*	1948–1950	107	40	51	16	—	.449	12	7	5	0		
4	Neil Colville*†	1950–1951	93	26	41	26	—	.419	—	—	—	—		
5	Bill Cook*†	1951–1953	117	34	59	24	—	.393	—	—	—	—		
—	Frank Boucher*†	1953–1954	40	14	20	6	—	.425	—	—	—	—		
6	Muzz Patrick†	1954–1955	100	32	46	22	—	.430	—	—	—	—		
7	Phil Watson	1955–1959	295	119	124	52	—	.492	16	4	12	—		
—	Muzz Patrick†	1959	2	0	1	1	—	.250	—	—	—	—		
8	Alfred Pike†	1959–1961	123	36	66	21	—	.378	—	—	—	—		
9	Doug Harvey*†	1961–1962	70	26	32	12	—	.457	6	2	4	—		
—	Muzz Patrick†	1962	34	11	19	4	—	.382	—	—	—	—		
10	Red Sullivan	1962–1965	196	58	103	35	—	.385	—	—	—	—		
11	Emile Francis*	1965–1968	194	82	82	30	—	.500	10	2	8	—		
12	Bernie Geoffrion*	1968–1969	43	22	18	3	—	.547	—	—	—	—		
—	Emile Francis*	1969–1973	343	201	88	54	—	.665	49	24	25	—		
13	Larry Popein†	1973–1974	41	18	14	9	—	.549	—	—	—	—		
—	Emile Francis*	1974–1975	117	59	39	19	—	.585	16	8	8	—		
14	Ron Stewart	1975–1976	39	15	20	4	—	.436	—	—	—	—		
15	John Ferguson Sr.	1976–1977	121	43	59	19	—	.434	—	—	—	—		
16	Jean-Guy Talbot	1977–1978	80	30	37	13	—	.456	3	1	2	—		
17	Fred Shero*	1978–1980	180	82	74	24	—	.522	27	15	12	—		
18	Craig Patrick*	1980–1981	60	26	23	11	—	.525	14	7	7	—		
19	Herb Brooks*	1981–1985	285	131	113	41	—	.532	24	12	12	—		
—	Craig Patrick*	1985	35	11	22	2	—	.343	3	0	3	—		
20	Ted Sator	1985–1986	99	41	48	10	—	.465	16	8	8	—		
21	Tom Webster	1986–1987	16	5	7	4	—	.438	—	—	—	—		
22	Phil Esposito*†	1987	43	24	19	0	—	.558	6	2	4	—		
23	Michel Bergeron	1987–1989	158	73	67	18	—	.519	—	—	—	—		
—	Phil Esposito*†	1989	2	0	2	0	—	.000	4	0	4	—		
24	Roger Neilson*	1989–1993	280	141	104	35	—	.566	29	13	16	—	Presidents' Trophy (1992)	
25	Ron Smith†	1993	44	15	22	7	—	.420	—	—	—	—		
26	Mike Keenan	1993–1994	84	52	24	8	—	.667	23	16	7	—	Presidents' Trophy (1994); Stanley Cup champions (1994)	
27	Colin Campbell*†	1994–1998	269	118	108	43	—	.519	36	18	18	—		
28	John Muckler	1998–2000	185	70	88	24	3	.451	—	—	—	—		
29	John Tortorella	2000	4	0	3	1	—	.125	—	—	—	—		
30	Ron Low	2000–2002	164	69	81	9	5	.463	—	—	—	—		
31	Bryan Trottier*†	2002–2003	54	21	26	6	1	.454	—	—	—	—		
32	Glen Sather*	2003–2004	90	33	39	11	7	.572	—	—	—	—		
33	Tom Renney	2004–2009	327	164	117	—	46	.572	24	11	13	—		
—	John Tortorella	2009–2013	315	171	115	—	29	.589	44	19	25	—		
34	Alain Vigneault	2013–2018	410	226	147	—	37	.596	61	31	30	—	Presidents' Trophy (2015)	
35	David Quinn	2018–2021	208	96	87	—	25	.522	3	0	3	—		
36	Gerard Gallant	2021–2023	164	99	46	—	19	.662	27	13	14	—		
37	Peter Laviolette	2023–2025	164	94	59	—	11	.607	16	10	6	—	Presidents' Trophy (2024)	
38	Mike Sullivan	2025–present	82	34	39	—	9	.470	—	—	—	—		

== See also ==
- List of NHL head coaches

== Notes ==
- ^{A} A running total of the number of coaches of the New York Rangers. Thus any coach who has two or more separate terms as head coach is only counted once.
