= List of New York Rangers general managers =

The New York Rangers are a professional ice hockey team based in Manhattan, New York. They are members of the Metropolitan Division of the Eastern Conference of the National Hockey League (NHL). Playing their home games at Madison Square Garden, the Rangers are one of the oldest teams in the NHL, having joined in 1926 as an expansion franchise, and are part of the group of teams referred to as the Original Six. The Rangers were the first NHL franchise in the United States to win the Stanley Cup, which they have done four times (most recently in 1994). The team is commonly referred to by its famous nickname, "The Broadway Blueshirts", or more commonly in New York media, as simply the "Blueshirts". The team has had eleven general managers since their inception, not including Conn Smythe. Smythe built the first Rangers team but was fired prior to the start of the inaugural season.

== Key ==
Key of terms and definitions
Term	Definition
No.	Number of general managers^{[a]}
Ref(s)	References
–	Does not apply
†	Elected to the Hockey Hall of Fame in the Builder category

== General managers ==
General managers of the New York Rangers
No.	Name	Tenure	Accomplishments during this term	Ref(s)
–	Conn Smythe	1926 – October 27, 1926		
1	Lester Patrick	October 27, 1926 – February 21, 1946	Won Stanley Cup 3 times in 6 Final appearances (1928, 1929, 1932, 1933, 1937, 1940); 2 division titles and 15 playoff appearances	
2	Frank Boucher	February 21, 1946 – April 22, 1955	1 Stanley Cup Final appearance (1950); 2 playoff appearances	
3	Muzz Patrick	April 22, 1955 – October 30, 1964	4 playoff appearances	
4	Emile Francis†	October 30, 1964 – January 6, 1976	1 Stanley Cup Final appearance (1972); 9 playoff appearances	
5	John Ferguson Sr.	January 7, 1976 – June 2, 1978	1 playoff appearance	
6	Fred Shero†	June 2, 1978 – November 21, 1980	1 Stanley Cup Final appearance (1979); 2 playoff appearances	
7	Craig Patrick	November 21, 1980 – July 14, 1986	6 playoff appearances	
8	Phil Esposito	July 14, 1986 – May 24, 1989	2 playoff appearances	
9	Neil Smith	July 17, 1989 – March 28, 2000	Won Presidents' Trophy two times (1991–92, 1993–94); Won Stanley Cup (1994); 1 conference title, 3 division titles, and 7 playoff appearances	
10	Glen Sather	June 1, 2000 – July 1, 2015	1 Stanley Cup Final appearance (2014); Won Presidents' Trophy (2014–15); 1 conference title, 2 division titles, and 9 playoff appearances	
11	Jeff Gorton	July 1, 2015 – May 5, 2021	2 playoff appearances; 1 Qualifiers appearance	
12	Chris Drury	May 5, 2021 – Present	3 playoff appearances; 2 Conference Final appearances; Won Presidents' Trophy (2023–24)	

== See also ==
- List of NHL general managers

== Notes ==
- ^{a} A running total of the number of general managers of the franchise. Thus any general manager who has two or more separate terms as general manager is only counted once.
