= Glenn Patrick =

American ice hockey player

- Born: April 26, 1950 (age 74); New York City, New York, U.S.
- Height: 6 ft 2 in (188 cm)
- Weight: 190 lb (86 kg; 13 st 8 lb)
- Position: Defense
- Shot: Left
- Played for: St. Louis Blues; California Golden Seals; Cleveland Barons; Edmonton Oilers
- National team: United States
- NHL draft: Undrafted
- Playing career: 1973–1977

Glenn Curtiss Patrick (born April 26, 1950) is an American former professional ice hockey player who played 38 games in the National Hockey League and 23 games in the World Hockey Association between 1973 and 1977. He played with the St. Louis Blues, California Golden Seals, Cleveland Barons, and Edmonton Oilers. Patrick was also a member of the United States national team at the 1978 Ice Hockey World Championship tournament. His father Lynn Patrick, older brother Craig Patrick, grandfather Lester Patrick, and granduncle Frank Patrick are all former professional players and managers and members of the Hockey Hall of Fame. Patrick was born in New York City, New York, but grew up in Wellesley, Massachusetts. Patrick graduated from Ladue High School in Ladue Missouri in 1968.

Glenn Patrick coached the minor league Wilkes-Barre/Scranton Penguins and Peoria Prancers after retiring from pro hockey in 1980.

Patrick is currently married.

== Career statistics ==
=== Regular season and playoffs ===
			Regular season					Playoffs
Season	Team	League	GP	G	A	Pts	PIM	GP	G	A	Pts	PIM
1968–69	University of Denver	WCHA	—	—	—	—	—	—	—	—	—	—
1969–70	University of Denver	WCHA	—	—	—	—	—	—	—	—	—	—
1970–71	University of Denver	WCHA	—	—	—	—	—	—	—	—	—	—
1970–71	Kansas City Blues	CHL	3	0	0	0	0	—	—	—	—	—
1971–72	Denver Spurs	WHL	5	0	1	1	6	9	0	2	2	21
1971–72	Columbus Golden Seals	IHL	52	1	8	9	89	—	—	—	—	—
1972–73	Denver Spurs	WHL	72	5	21	26	125	5	0	1	1	0
1973–74	St. Louis Blues	NHL	1	0	0	0	2	—	—	—	—	—
1973–74	Denver Spurs	WHL	68	7	24	31	163	—	—	—	—	—
1974–75	Salt Lake Golden Eagles	CHL	75	2	26	28	151	11	1	2	3	31
1974–75	California Golden Seals	NHL	2	0	0	0	0	—	—	—	—	—
1975–76	Salt Lake Golden Eagles	CHL	63	7	18	25	140	5	0	0	0	0
1976–77	Salt Lake Golden Eagles	CHL	14	0	7	7	46	—	—	—	—	—
1976–77	Cleveland Barons	NHL	35	2	3	5	70	—	—	—	—	—
1976–77	Edmonton Oilers	WHA	23	0	4	4	62	2	0	0	0	0
1977–78	Hershey Bears	AHL	13	1	8	9	15	—	—	—	—	—
1977–78	Hampton Gulls	AHL	13	0	1	1	21	—	—	—	—	—
1978–79	Hampton Aces	NEHL	11	0	1	1	11	—	—	—	—	—
WHA totals			23	0	4	4	62	2	0	0	0	0
NHL totals			38	2	3	5	72	—	—	—	—	—

=== International ===
Year	Team	Event	GP	G	A	Pts	PIM
1978	United States	WC	9	1	3	4	4
Senior totals			9	1	3	4	4
