= Lynn Patrick =

Canadian ice hockey player (1912–1990)

- Hockey Hall of Fame, 1980
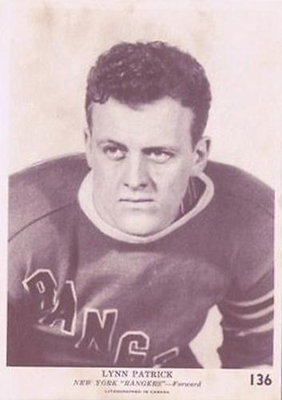
- Patrick for 1940 card
- Born: February 3, 1912 Victoria, British Columbia, Canada
- Died: January 26, 1980 (aged 67) St. Louis, Missouri, U.S.
- Height: 6 ft 1 in (185 cm)
- Weight: 205 lb (93 kg; 14 st 9 lb)
- Position: Left wing
- Shot: Left
- Played for: New York Rangers
- Playing career: 1934–1947

Joseph Lynn Patrick (February 3, 1912 – January 26, 1980) was a Canadian professional ice hockey player and executive. As a player, Patrick played ten seasons in the National Hockey League (NHL) for the New York Rangers. He was twice named to the NHL All-Star team and was a member of the Rangers' 1940 Stanley Cup championship team. Patrick turned to coaching following his playing career, serving first with the Rangers, then the Boston Bruins – where he was also general manager – and finally as the first head coach of the St. Louis Blues.

Patrick was part of one of hockey's most famous families. His brother Muzz and son Glenn were also NHL players, while his father Lester, uncle Frank Patrick and son Craig are all members of the Hockey Hall of Fame. Lynn was himself posthumously inducted into the Hall of Fame in 1980 and was a recipient of the Lester Patrick Trophy in 1989 for his contributions to the sport in the United States.

== Early life ==
Patrick was born February 3, 1912, in Victoria, British Columbia. His father Lester and uncle Frank were founders and operators of the Pacific Coast Hockey Association (PCHA). Lynn also played hockey growing up, until Victoria's Patrick Arena burned down in 1929. Lynn played several sports in addition to hockey; he was a member of the Vancouver Blue Ribbons basketball team that won the Canadian national championship in 1933. After his father sent he and his brother Muzz to Montreal to study at McGill University, Patrick resumed his hockey career with the Royal Montreal Hockey Club in 1933. He also played basketball and football at the same time.

== Playing career ==
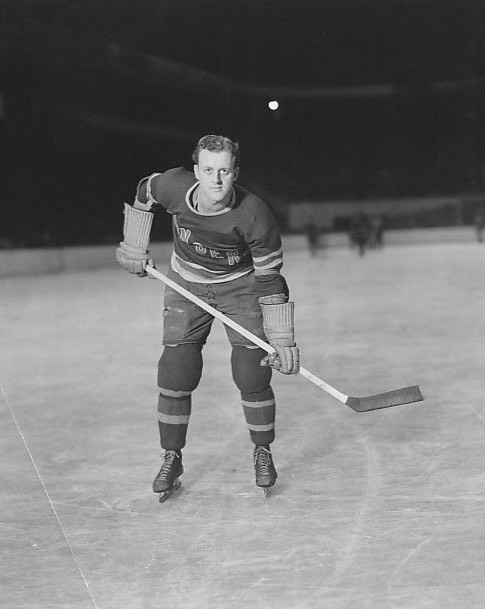
Patrick in 1939 photo

Lester Patrick was managing the New York Rangers of the National Hockey League (NHL) in 1934 when his assistants convinced him to sign Lynn to a contract. Lester was hesitant, fearing that such a move would be labeled as nepotism. Nonetheless, the Rangers signed Lynn to a contract on November 4, 1934. He made his NHL debut on November 10, 1934, against the St. Louis Eagles. Lynn struggled in his rookie season of 1934–35, resulting in the criticism Lester feared. Lynn was often maligned by fans and the press, but was a steady presence for the Rangers over the next several seasons as he scored between 25 and 34 points in 48-game seasons between 1935–36 and 1939–40. His brother Muzz joined the team in 1938, and the pair were members of New York's 1940 Stanley Cup championship team.

Playing on a line by Bryan Hextall and Phil Watson, Patrick developed into a leading offensive player for the Rangers. He recorded 44 points in 1940–41, then led the NHL with 32 goals in 1941–42. He was named to the NHL's first All-Star team, and to the second team in 1942–43. That season, Patrick set a career high with 61 points. Patrick then left the NHL for two years to serve with the United States military in the Second World War. He returned to the league for one final NHL season in 1945–46, but found that he lost his skating speed during his time off and switched from left wing to defence. In 455 games over ten seasons, Patrick scored 145 goals and 335 points.

== Coaching career ==
The Rangers named Patrick the head coach of their American Hockey League (AHL) affiliate, the New Haven Ramblers for the 1946–47 season. He was also listed as a utility player for the team, but hoped he would play only if necessary. Nonetheless, he appeared in 16 games for the Ramblers; he recorded two goals and six assists. He remained with New Haven for the following two seasons, and was promoted to head coach of the Rangers midway through the 1948–49 NHL season. He served as Rangers coach until 1950. After leading the Rangers to the Stanley Cup Final, he was offered the coaching position with the Boston Bruins, with a raise to $12,000 per year. When the Rangers refused to pay Patrick more than $9,000 he resigned and joined the Bruins.

Patrick coached the Bruins between 1950 and 1955. He was also named the team's general manager in 1954, a position he held until 1964. Patrick had three short stints as head coach of the St. Louis Blues and two as general manager. He was as the first general manager and head coach of the Blues in 1967–68, but quickly surrendered the coaching role to Scotty Bowman, who led the team to an appearance in the 1968 Stanley Cup Final. He ultimately became the Blues' senior vice president, a position he held until his retirement in 1977.

In 1958, Patrick and journalist Leo Monahan co-published the book Let's Play Hockey! as an instructional guide for coaching ice hockey.

== Personal life ==
Patrick was married to Dorothea Davis, a model and actress, between 1939 and 1941. He and Dorothea had one son, Lester Lee Patrick. Lynn then married Bernice Lang. They had four children together, Craig Patrick, Karen Patrick, Glenn Patrick, and Dean Patrick.

Lynn Patrick died on January 26, 1980. He left a Blues game that night due to illness but crashed his car near the arena after suffering a heart attack.

Lynn was a member of one of hockey's most famous families. His father Lester and uncle Frank were both inducted into the Hockey Hall of Fame. His brother Muzz was an NHL player, as were his sons Craig and Glenn. Lynn was posthumously inducted into the Hall of Fame in 1980, months after his death. Craig became the fourth member of the Patrick family so honoured in 2001. USA Hockey recognized Lynn's contributions to hockey in the United States by naming him a recipient of the Lester Patrick Trophy in 1989.

== Career statistics ==
=== Regular season and playoffs ===
			Regular season					Playoffs
Season	Team	League	GP	G	A	Pts	PIM	GP	G	A	Pts	PIM
1933–34	Montreal Royals	MCHL	15	5	3	8	4	2	0	0	0	0
1934–35	New York Rangers	NHL	48	9	13	22	17	4	2	2	4	0
1935–36	New York Rangers	NHL	48	11	14	25	29	—	—	—	—	—
1936–37	New York Rangers	NHL	45	8	16	24	23	9	3	0	3	2
1937–38	New York Rangers	NHL	48	15	19	34	24	3	0	1	1	2
1938–39	New York Rangers	NHL	35	8	21	29	25	7	1	1	2	0
1939–40	New York Rangers	NHL	48	12	16	28	34	12	2	2	4	4
1940–41	New York Rangers	NHL	48	20	24	44	12	3	1	0	1	14
1941–42	New York Rangers	NHL	47	32	22	54	18	6	1	0	1	0
1942–43	New York Rangers	NHL	50	22	39	61	28	—	—	—	—	—
1945–46	New York Rangers	NHL	38	8	6	14	30	—	—	—	—	—
1946–47	New Haven Ramblers	AHL	16	2	6	8	16	3	1	0	1	2
NHL totals			455	145	190	335	240	44	10	6	16	22

=== Coaching record ===
Season	Team	League	Regular season							Post season
Season	Team	League	G	W	L	T	Pts	Division rank	Result	
1948–49	New York Rangers	NHL	37	12	20	5	29	6th overall	Did not qualify	
1949–50	New York Rangers	NHL	70	28	31	11	67	4th overall	Lost Stanley Cup Finals	
1950–51	Boston Bruins	NHL	70	22	38	18	62	4th overall	Lost in semi-finals	
1951–52	Boston Bruins	NHL	70	25	29	16	66	4th overall	Lost in semi-finals	
1952–53	Boston Bruins	NHL	70	28	29	13	69	3rd overall	Lost Stanley Cup Finals	
1953–54	Boston Bruins	NHL	70	32	28	10	74	4th overall	Lost in semi-finals	
1954–55	Boston Bruins	NHL	30	10	14	6	26	4th overall	Fired	
1967–68	St. Louis Blues	NHL	16	4	10	2	10	3rd in West	Resigned	
1974–75	St. Louis Blues	NHL	2	1	0	1	3	2nd in Smythe	Resigned	
1975–76	St. Louis Blues	NHL	8	3	5	0	6	3rd in Smythe	Resigned	
Total			443	165	196	82	412			

== Awards and honours ==
NHL
Award	Year	Ref.
First team All-Star	1941–42	
Second team all-star	1942–43	
Lester Patrick Trophy; Contributions to the sport in the United States	1989	

== See also ==
- List of family relations in the NHL

Preceded by Frank Boucher	Head coach of the New York Rangers; 1948–50	Succeeded by Neil Colville
Preceded by Georges Boucher	Head coach of the Boston Bruins; 1950–54	Succeeded by Milt Schmidt
Preceded by Art Ross	General manager of the Boston Bruins; 1954–65	Succeeded by Hap Emms
Preceded by Position created Lou Angotti; Garry Young	Head coach of the St. Louis Blues; 1967; 1974; 1975–76	Succeeded by Scott Bowman; Garry Young; Leo Boivin
