= Muzz Patrick =

Canadian ice hockey player and coach

- Born: June 28, 1915 Victoria, British Columbia, Canada
- Died: July 27, 1998 (aged 83) Riverside, Connecticut, United States
- Height: 6 ft 2 in (188 cm)
- Weight: 200 lb (91 kg; 14 st 4 lb)
- Position: Defence
- Shot: Left
- Played for: New York Rangers
- Playing career: 1937–1941; 1945–1950

Frederick Murray "Muzz" Patrick (June 28, 1915 – July 27, 1998) was a Canadian ice hockey player, coach, and general manager. He played in the National Hockey League with the New York Rangers from 1938 to 1941, and then from 1945 to 1946. He was general manager of the Rangers from 1955 to 1964, serving as coach on three occasions during that time. As a player, Patrick won the Stanley Cup with the Rangers in 1940. He was part of the Patrick family, which had a long association with hockey: his father Lester had previously worked as the Rangers coach and manager, among other roles; his uncle Frank had founded the Pacific Coast Hockey Association (PCHA) with Lester; and Muzz's brother Lynn had played on the Rangers with him and later coached and managed the Boston Bruins.

== Early life ==
Patrick was born in Victoria, British Columbia, in 1915. He excelled at several sports as a kid, including boxing, and in 1934, he won the Canadian amateur heavyweight title.

== Ice hockey career ==
Patrick began his professional hockey career with the EAHL's New York Crescents in 1934, and in 1938, he started playing for the NHL's New York Rangers. He helped the team win the Stanley Cup in 1939–40. From 1941 to 1945, Patrick served in the U.S. military and attained the rank of captain.

After the war, Patrick played for the Rangers for one season and in 1946 left the team to accept a position as a player-coach with the St. Paul Saints of the United States Hockey League. He spent two years with the Saints before moving to the Tacoma Rockets of the Western Hockey League (WHL), playing a few games with the Rockets when needed. In 1953 he joined the Seattle Bombers of the WHL, though left the team in 1954 when the Rangers hired him to coach there.

In 1954, he returned to the Rangers as a coach. He coached for one season and then served as the team's GM until 1964.

== Personal life ==
Patrick's father, Lester, and brother, Lynn, were also coaches in the NHL. His son is Washington Capitals executive Dick Patrick.

Patrick married Jessie Farr in December 1942. During the Second World War both he and Lynn enlisted in the US Army in 1942; though not American citizens they were eligible based on their residency status in the United States. Patrick was initially stationed in Norfolk, Virginia, though also served on transports overseas in Africa, Italy, and France. He rose to the rank of captain before being discharged in September 1945.

Patrick died in Riverside, Connecticut, in 1998. He was survived by his wife, Jessie, four children, 12 grandchildren, and 2 great-grandchildren.

== Career statistics ==
=== Regular season and playoffs ===
			Regular season					Playoffs
Season	Team	League	GP	G	A	Pts	PIM	GP	G	A	Pts	PIM
1933–34	Westmount Academy	HS-CA	—	—	—	—	—	—	—	—	—	—
1934–35	New York Crescents	EAHL	21	3	3	6	16	6	2	3	5	9
1935–36	New York Rovers	EAHL	40	3	8	11	31	8	2	2	4	15
1936–37	Philadelphia Ramblers	IAHL	50	2	11	13	75	6	0	1	1	2
1937–38	Philadelphia Ramblers	IAHL	48	3	6	9	37	5	2	0	2	6
1937–38	New York Rangers	NHL	1	0	2	2	0	3	0	0	0	2
1938–39	New York Rangers	NHL	48	1	10	11	70	7	1	0	1	17
1939–40	New York Rangers	NHL	44	2	4	6	44	12	3	0	3	13
1940–41	New York Rangers	NHL	47	2	8	10	21	3	0	0	0	2
1945–46	New York Rangers	NHL	24	0	2	2	4	—	—	—	—	—
1945–46	Providence Reds	AHL	2	0	1	1	0	—	—	—	—	—
1945–46	St. Paul Saints	USHL	7	0	0	0	0	—	—	—	—	—
1949–50	Tacoma Rockets	PCHL	8	0	0	0	12	—	—	—	—	—
NHL totals			164	5	26	31	139	25	4	0	4	34

== Coaching record ==
Team	Year	Regular season						Playoffs
Team	Year	G	W	L	T	Pts	Division rank	Result
New York Rangers	1953–54	30	15	11	4	34	5th in NHL	Did not qualify
New York Rangers	1954–55	70	17	35	18	52	5th in NHL	Did not qualify
New York Rangers	1959–60	2	0	1	1	1	6th in NHL	Did not qualify
New York Rangers	1962–63	34	11	19	4	26	5th in NHL	Did not qualify
NHL totals		136	43	66	27	113		

== See also ==
- List of family relations in the NHL

Preceded by Frank Boucher	Head coach of the New York Rangers; 1954–55	Succeeded by Phil Watson
Preceded by Phil Watson	Head coach of the New York Rangers; 1959	Succeeded by Alf Pike
Preceded by Doug Harvey	Head coach of the New York Rangers; 1962	Succeeded by George Sullivan
Preceded by Frank Boucher	General Manager of the New York Rangers; 1955–64	Succeeded by Emile Francis
