= 1911–12 Montreal Canadiens season =

NHA team season

1911–12 Montreal Canadiens
- League: 4th NHA
- 1911–12 record: 8–10–0
- Home record: 4–5–0
- Road record: 4–5–0
- Goals for: 59
- Goals against: 66

Team information
- General manager: George Kennedy
- Coach: Napoleon Dorval
- Captain: Jack Laviolette
- Arena: Montreal Arena

Team leaders
- Goals: Didier Pitre (28)
- Goals against average: Georges Vezina (3.7)

The 1911–12 Montreal Canadiens season was the team's third season and also the third season of the National Hockey Association (NHA). The club would decline to an 8–10 record and finish last.

== Regular season ==
The team would lose two players, its top player Newsy Lalonde and Skinner Poulin to the new Pacific Coast League. Arthur Bernier joined the Wanderers. It was the second season for Georges Vezina and he would again lead the league in goals-against average with a GAA of 3.7 goals per game. The club would fall to last in the regular season standings.

Despite the fall in standings, Didier Pitre received a new automobile for his play over the last two seasons, from the La Presse newspaper, lacrosse league executives and hockey fans.

=== Final standings ===
National Hockey Association
	GP	W	L	T	GF	GA
Quebec Bulldogs	18	10	8	0	81	79
Ottawa Hockey Club	18	9	9	0	99	83
Montreal Wanderers	18	9	9	0	95	96
Montreal Canadiens	18	8	10	0	59	66

Note: W = Wins, L = Losses, T = Ties, GF= Goals For, GA = Goals Against

=== Results ===
Month	Day	Visitor	Score	Home	Score
Jan.	3	Wanderers	5	Canadiens	0
Jan.	6	Canadiens	5	Quebec	4
Jan.	10	Wanderers	1	Canadiens	6
Jan.	13	Ottawa	4	Canadiens	3
Jan.	17	Canadiens	5	Ottawa	4
Jan.	20	Canadiens	6	Wanderers	3
Jan.	24	Canadiens	2	Quebec	6
Jan.	27	Quebec	3	Canadiens	5
Jan.	31	Wanderers	2	Canadiens	1
Feb.	3	Ottawa	3	Canadiens	9
Feb.	7	Canadiens	2	Ottawa	4
Feb.	9	Canadiens	2	Quebec	5
Feb.	14	Quebec	2	Canadiens	1
Feb.	18	Canadiens	1	Ottawa	6
Feb.	21	Canadiens	1	Wanderers	9
Feb.	25	Ottawa	3	Canadiens	2 (22' overtime)
Feb.	28	Quebec	3	Canadiens	6
Mar.	2	Canadiens	2	Wanderers	1 (6'36" overtime)

== Playoffs ==
The team did not qualify for the playoffs.

== Player statistics ==
=== Goaltending averages ===
Name	Club	GP	GA	SO	Avg.
Georges Vezina	Canadiens	18	66		3.7

=== Leading scorers ===
Name	GP	G
Didier Pitre	18	28
Eugene Payan	17	9
Frank "Pud" Glass	16	7
Jack Laviolette	18	7
Hector Dallaire	10	5

- Coleman, Charles L. (1966). The Trail of the Stanley Cup, vol. 1 1893–1926 inc. p. 226.

== See also ==
- 1911–12 NHA season
