= 1917–18 PCHA season =

Can-Am pro ice hockey league season

- League: Pacific Coast Hockey Association
- Sport: Ice hockey
- Duration: December 28, 1917–March 8, 1918
- Teams: 3

Regular season
- League leader: Seattle Metropolitans
- Top scorer: Cyclone Taylor (Vancouver)

Playoffs
- Champions: Vancouver Millionaires
- Runners-up: Seattle Metropolitans

PCHA seasons
- ← 1916–17 1919 →

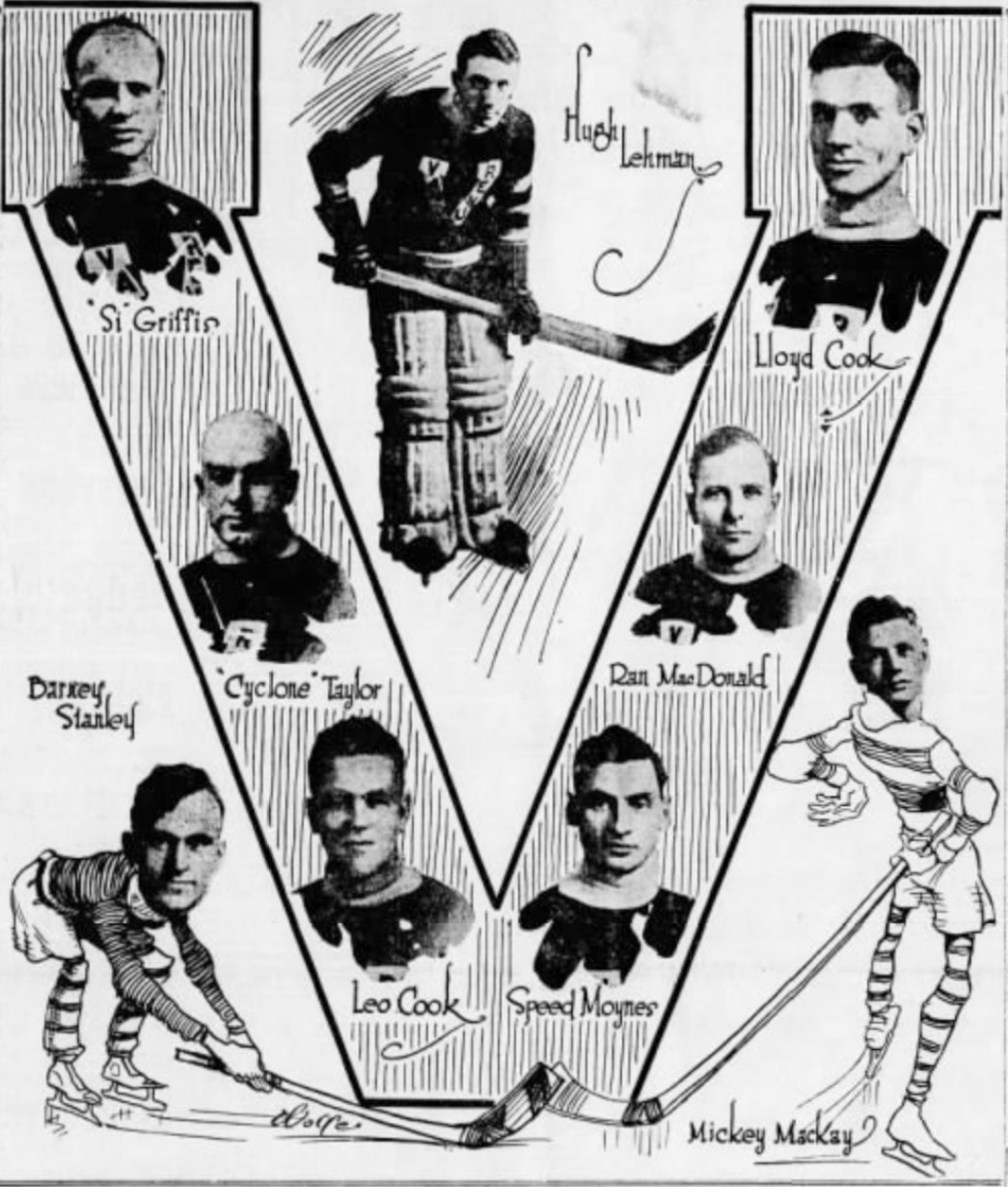
Vancouver Millionaires in 1917–18.

The 1917–18 PCHA season was the seventh season of the professional men's ice hockey Pacific Coast Hockey Association league. Season play ran from December 28, 1917, until March 8, 1918. The season was reduced to 18 games per team. The Seattle Metropolitans club would be regular-season PCHA champions, but lost the play-off to the Vancouver Millionaires. The Millionaires then played in the Stanley Cup Final series against Toronto, the NHL champions. Toronto won the best-of-five series 3–2 to win the Cup.

== League business ==
The Spokane franchise folded and the league operated with three teams again. The players were distributed to the other teams.

The league decided to split the schedule with each half's winners playing for the championship. This was revised so that the first and second teams played off for the championship. Previously, playoffs were only held when teams tied for first place. Devised by Frank Patrick as a "second-chance" to increase interest in the league, the idea eventually spread to all North American professional sports.

== Teams ==
1917–18 Pacific Coast Hockey Association
Team	City	Arena	Capacity
Portland Rosebuds	Portland, Oregon	Portland Ice Arena	2,000
Seattle Metropolitans	Seattle, Washington	Seattle Ice Arena	4,000
Vancouver Millionaires	Vancouver, British Columbia	Denman Arena	10,500

=== Map of teams ===
PCHA Teams

== Regular season ==
=== Final standings ===
Note: W = Wins, L = Losses, T = Ties, GF= Goals For, GA = Goals against
Teams that qualified for the playoffs are highlighted in bold

Pacific Coast Hockey Association Team	GP	W	L	T	GF	GA
**Seattle Metropolitans**	18	11	7	0	67	65
**Vancouver Millionaires**	18	9	9	0	70	60
Portland Rosebuds	18	7	11	0	63	75

Source: Coleman(1966)

== Playoffs ==
The Vancouver Millionaires defeated the defending Stanley Cup champion Seattle Metropolitans, taking a two-game total-goals series 3–2 on a 1–0 win over Seattle in the second game.

Seattle Metropolitans vs. Vancouver Millionaires

Date	Away	Score	Home	Score
March 11	Seattle	2	Vancouver	2
March 14	**Vancouver**	**1**	Seattle	0

Vancouver Millionaires win two-games total-goals series 3-2.

=== Stanley Cup Final ===
Vancouver travelled to Toronto for the Stanley Cup Final. The playing rules alternated between the NHL's six-man and the PCHA's seven-man rules. All games were won by the team whose rules were being played. Vancouver won the PCHA games 6–4 and 8–1 but lost the NHL rule games 5–3, 6–3, and 2–1.

Game-by-Game		Winning team	Score	Losing team	Rules Used	Location
1	March 20	Toronto	5–3	Vancouver	NHL	Arena Gardens
2	March 23	Vancouver	6–4	Toronto	PCHA	Arena Gardens
3	March 26	Toronto	6–3	Vancouver	NHL	Arena Gardens
4	March 28	Vancouver	8–1	Toronto	PCHA	Arena Gardens
5	March 30	Toronto	2–1	Vancouver	NHL	Arena Gardens
Torontos wins best-of-five series 3 games to 2

== Schedule and results ==
Month	Day	Visitor	Score	Home	Score
Dec.	28	Vancouver	2	Portland	4
Jan.	1	Portland	0	Seattle	1 (OT 19'57")
Jan.	4	Seattle	2	Vancouver	3 (OT 5'35")
Jan.	8	Seattle	4	Portland	8
Jan.	11	Vancouver	2	Seattle	5
Jan.	14	Portland	1	Vancouver	4
Jan.	16	Vancouver	1	Portland	0 (OT 12'38")
Jan.	18	Portland	5	Seattle	2
Jan.	22	Seattle	5	Vancouver	4
Jan.	25	Seattle	3	Portland	2
Jan.	28	Portland	3	Vancouver	4
Jan.	30	Vancouver	3	Seattle	4 (OT 23'10")
Feb.	4	Seattle	5	Vancouver	6 (OT 10'45")
Feb.	6	Portland	3	Seattle	9
Feb.	8	Vancouver	4	Portland	8
Feb.	11	Portland	3	Vancouver	6
Feb.	13	Vancouver	1	Seattle	3
Feb.	15	Seattle	2	Portland	4
Feb.	18	Seattle	1	Vancouver	8
Feb.	21	Portland	2	Seattle	6
Feb.	22	Vancouver	1	Portland	2 (OT 20'20")
Feb.	25	Portland	4	Vancouver	9
Feb.	27	Vancouver	1	Seattle	2 (OT 22'20")
March	1	Seattle	3	Portland	1
March	4	Portland	4	Vancouver	8
March	6	Vancouver	3	Seattle	4 (OT 2'58")
March	8	Seattle	6	Portland	9

Source: Coleman 1966.

== Player statistics ==
=== Scoring leaders ===
Player	Team	GP	G	A	Pts	PIM
Cyclone Taylor	Vancouver Millionaires	18	32	11	43	0
Bernie Morris	Seattle Metropolitans	18	20	12	32	9
Gordon Roberts	Seattle Metropolitans	18	20	3	23	24
Eddie Oatman	Portland Rosebuds	18	11	10	21	16
Tommy Dunderdale	Portland Rosebuds	18	14	6	20	57
Mickey MacKay	Vancouver Millionaires	18	10	8	18	31
Alf Barbour	Portland Rosebuds	17	12	5	17	0
Barney Stanley	Vancouver Millionaires	18	11	6	17	9
Charles Tobin	Portland Rosebuds	18	13	3	16	0
Frank Foyston	Seattle Metropolitans	13	9	5	14	9

=== Goaltending averages ===
Name	Club	GP	GA	SO	Avg.
Hugh Lehman	Vancouver	18	60	1	3.3
Norman Fowler	Seattle	18	65	1	3.6
Tom Murray	Portland	18	75		4.2

Source: Coleman(1966)

== See also ==
- 1917–18 NHL season
