= List of Montreal Canadiens seasons =

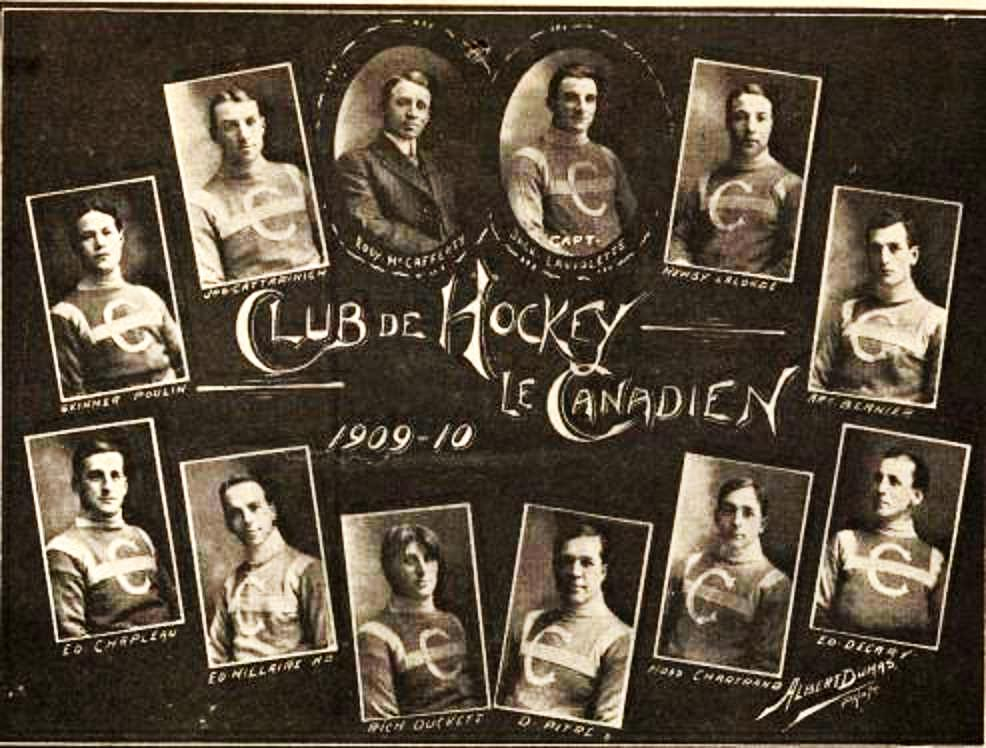
The 1909–10 Canadiens

The Montreal Canadiens (French: Les Canadiens de Montréal) are a professional ice hockey team based in Montreal. They are members of the Atlantic Division in the Eastern Conference of the National Hockey League (NHL), and are one of the Original Six teams of the league. The club is officially known as Club de hockey Canadien. Founded in 1909, they have played a total of 116 seasons, eight with the National Hockey Association (NHA) and 108 with the NHA's successor, the NHL. They are the only club to have played every season for both leagues and the only active NHL team to pre-date the founding of that league. They have won the Stanley Cup 24 times, once under the NHA and 23 times since the founding of the NHL, and have also won 11 O'Brien Cup titles, 24 division championships, and eight conference championships. Overall they have the most games played, most wins, most ties, most points, most years in the playoffs, most division championships, and most Stanley Cup championships of any team in the NHL.

== Table key ==
Key of colors and symbols
Color/symbol	Explanation
†	Stanley Cup champions
‡	Conference champions
§	O'Brien Cup champions
↑	Division champions
#	Led league in points

Key of terms and abbreviations
Term or abbreviation	Definition
Finish	Final position in division or league standings
GP	Number of games played
W	Number of wins
L	Number of losses
T	Number of ties
OT	Number of losses in overtime (since the 1999–2000 season)
Pts	Number of points
GF	Goals for (goals scored by the Canadiens)
GA	Goals against (goals scored by the Canadiens' opponents)
—	Does not apply
TG	Two-game total goals series

== NHA (1910–1917) ==
From 1909–10 until 1916–17 the Canadiens played 8 seasons in the National Hockey Association (NHA). They qualified for the postseason three times and won two NHA championships as well as their first Stanley Cup title.

Montreal Canadiens NHA regular season and postseason statistics and results, 1910–1917
NHA season	Canadiens season	Regular season								Postseason						
NHA season	Canadiens season	Finish	GP	W	L	T	PTS	GF	GA	GP	W	L	T	GF	GA	Result
1910	1909–10	7th	12	2	10	0	4	59	100	—	—	—	—	—	—	Did not qualify
1910–11	1910–11	2nd	16	8	8	0	16	66	62	—	—	—	—	—	—	Did not qualify
1911–12	1911–12	4th	18	8	10	0	16	59	66	—	—	—	—	—	—	Did not qualify
1912–13	1912–13	5th	20	9	11	0	18	83	81	—	—	—	—	—	—	Did not qualify
1913–14	1913–14	2nd^{[a]}	20	13	7	0	26#	85	65	2	1	1	0	2	6	Lost in NHA Finals, 2–6 (TG) (Blueshirts)
1914–15	1914–15	6th	20	6	14	0	12	65	81	—	—	—	—	—	—	Did not qualify
1915–16	1915–16	1st§^{[b]}	24	16	7	1	33#	104	76	5	3	2	—	15	13	Won in Stanley Cup Final, 3–2 (Rosebuds)†
1916–17^{[c]}	1916–17	1st§	10	7	3	0	14	58	38	6	2	4	0	18	29	Won in NHA Finals, 7–6 (TG) (Senators); Lost in Stanley Cup Final, 1–3 (Metropolitans)
1916–17^{[c]}	1916–17	3rd§	10	3	7	0	6	31	42	6	2	4	0	18	29	Won in NHA Finals, 7–6 (TG) (Senators); Lost in Stanley Cup Final, 1–3 (Metropolitans)
Totals, 1910–1917			150	72	77	1	145	610	611	13	6	7	0	35	48	

=== Notes (1910–1917) ===
- ^{a} The Canadiens finished the 1913–14 season tied with the Toronto Blueshirts. The Blueshirts won the playoff and so the Canadiens finished in second place.
- ^{b} From the 1910 season to the 1916–17 season, the O'Brien Cup was awarded to the champion of the NHA.
- ^{c} The 1916–17 NHA season was played in two half seasons. Montreal qualified for the two-game total-goal playoff by winning the first half of the schedule.

== NHL ==
Season	Canadiens season	Conference	Division	Regular season									Postseason						
Season	Canadiens season	Conference	Division	Finish	GP	W	L	T	OT	Pts	GF	GA	GP	W	L	T	GF	GA	Result
1917–18^{[d]}	1917–18	—	—^{[e]}	1st	14	10	4	0	—	20#	81	47	2	1	1	0	7	10	Lost in NHL Finals, 7–10 (TG) (Arenas)
1917–18^{[d]}	1917–18	—	—^{[e]}	3rd	8	3	5	0	—	6	34	37	2	1	1	0	7	10	Lost in NHL Finals, 7–10 (TG) (Arenas)
1918–19	1918–19	—	—	1st§^{[f]}	10	7	3	0	—	14#	57	50	10	6	3	1	36	37	Won in NHL Finals, 4–1 (Senators); Series suspended Stanley Cup Final, 2–2–1 (Metropolitans)^{[g]}
1918–19	1918–19	—	—	2nd§	8	3	5	0	—	6	31	28	10	6	3	1	36	37	Won in NHL Finals, 4–1 (Senators); Series suspended Stanley Cup Final, 2–2–1 (Metropolitans)^{[g]}
1919–20	1919–20	—	—	2nd	12	8	4	0	—	16	62	51	—	—	—	—	—	—	Did not qualify
1919–20	1919–20	—	—	3rd	12	5	7	0	—	10	67	62	—	—	—	—	—	—	Did not qualify
1920–21	1920–21	—	—	3rd	10	4	6	0	—	8	37	51	—	—	—	—	—	—	Did not qualify
1920–21	1920–21	—	—	2nd	14	9	5	0	—	18	75	48	—	—	—	—	—	—	Did not qualify
1921–22	1921–22	—	—	3rd	24	12	11	1	—	25	88	94	—	—	—	—	—	—	Did not qualify
1922–23	1922–23	—	—	2nd	24	13	9	2	—	28	73	61	2	1	1	0	2	3	Lost in NHL Finals, 2–3 (TG) (Senators)
1923–24	1923–24	—	—	2nd§	24	13	11	0	—	26	59	48	6	6	0	0	19	6	Won in NHL Finals, 5–2 (TG) (Senators); Won in Stanley Cup semifinals, 2–0 (Van. Maroons); Won in Stanley Cup Final, 2–0 (Tigers)†
1924–25	1924–25	—	—	3rd§	30	17	11	2	—	36	93	56	6	3	3	0	13	18	Won in NHL semifinals, 5–2 (TG) (St. Patricks); Winner of NHL semifinals declared league champion after Hamilton Tigers suspended due to financial dispute^{[h]} Lost in Stanley Cup Final, 1–3 (Cougars)
1925–26	1925–26	—	—	7th	36	11	24	1	—	23	79	108	—	—	—	—	—	—	Did not qualify
1926–27	1926–27	—	Canadian^{[i]}	2nd	44	28	14	2	—	58	99	67	4	1	1	2	3	6	Won in quarterfinals, 2–1 (TG) (Mtl. Maroons); Lost in semifinals, 1–5 (TG) (Senators)
1927–28	1927–28	—	Canadian↑	1st§^{[j]}	44	26	11	7	—	59#	116	48	2	0	1	1	2	3	Lost in semifinals, 2–3 (TG) (Mtl. Maroons)
1928–29	1928–29	—	Canadian↑	1st§	44	22	7	15	—	59#	71	43	3	0	3	—	2	5	Lost in semifinals, 0–3 (Bruins)
1929–30	1929–30	—	Canadian	2nd	44	21	14	9	—	51	142	114	6	5	0	1	14	6	Won in quarterfinals, 3–2 (TG) (Black Hawks); Won in semifinals, 2–0 (Rangers); Won in Stanley Cup Final, 2–0 (Bruins)†
1930–31	1930–31	—	Canadian↑	1st§	44	26	10	8	—	60	129	89	10	6	4	—	24	21	Won in semifinals, 3–2 (Bruins); Won in Stanley Cup Final, 3–2 (Black Hawks)†
1931–32	1931–32	—	Canadian↑	1st§	48	25	16	7	—	57#	128	111	4	1	3	—	9	13	Lost in semifinals, 1–3 (Rangers)
1932–33	1932–33	—	Canadian	3rd	48	18	25	5	—	41	92	115	2	0	1	1	5	8	Lost in quarterfinals, 5–8 (TG) (Rangers)
1933–34	1933–34	—	Canadian	2nd	48	22	20	6	—	50	99	101	2	0	1	1	3	4	Lost in quarterfinals, 3–4 (TG) (Black Hawks)
1934–35	1934–35	—	Canadian	3rd	48	19	23	6	—	44	110	145	2	0	1	1	5	6	Lost in quarterfinals, 5–6 (TG) (Rangers)
1935–36	1935–36	—	Canadian	4th	48	11	26	11	—	33	82	123	—	—	—	—	—	—	Did not qualify
1936–37	1936–37	—	Canadian↑	1st§	48	24	18	6	—	54	115	111	5	2	3	—	8	13	Lost in semifinals, 2–3 (Red Wings)
1937–38	1937–38	—	Canadian	3rd	48	18	17	13	—	49	123	128	3	1	2	—	8	11	Lost in quarterfinals, 1–2 (Black Hawks)
1938–39	1938–39	—	—^{[k]}	6th	48	15	24	9	—	39	115	146	3	1	2	—	5	8	Lost in quarterfinals, 1–2 (Red Wings)
1939–40	1939–40	—	—	7th	48	10	33	5	—	25	90	167	—	—	—	—	—	—	Did not qualify
1940–41	1940–41	—	—	6th	48	16	26	6	—	38	121	147	3	1	2	—	7	8	Lost in quarterfinals, 1–2 (Black Hawks)
1941–42	1941–42	—	—	6th	48	18	27	3	—	39	134	173	3	1	2	—	8	8	Lost in quarterfinals, 1–2 (Red Wings)
1942–43	1942–43	—	—	4th	50	19	19	12	—	50	181	191	5	1	4	—	17	18	Lost in semifinals, 1–4 (Bruins)
1943–44	1943–44	—	—	1st	50	38	5	7	—	83#	234	109	9	8	1	—	39	14	Won in semifinals, 4–1 (Maple Leafs); Won in Stanley Cup Final, 4–0 (Black Hawks)†
1944–45	1944–45	—	—	1st	50	38	8	4	—	80#	228	121	6	2	4	—	21	15	Lost in semifinals, 2–4 (Maple Leafs)
1945–46	1945–46	—	—	1st	50	28	17	5	—	61#	172	134	9	8	1	—	45	20	Won in semifinals, 4–0 (Black Hawks); Won in Stanley Cup Final, 4–1 (Bruins)†
1946–47	1946–47	—	—	1st§^{[l]}	60	34	16	10	—	78#	189	138	11	6	5	—	29	23	Won in semifinals, 4–1 (Bruins); Lost in Stanley Cup Final, 2–4 (Maple Leafs)
1947–48	1947–48	—	—	5th	60	20	29	11	—	51	147	169	—	—	—	—	—	—	Did not qualify
1948–49	1948–49	—	—	3rd	60	28	23	9	—	65	152	126	7	3	4	—	14	17	Lost in semifinals, 3–4 (Red Wings)
1949–50	1949–50	—	—	2nd	70	29	22	19	—	77	172	150	5	1	4	—	7	15	Lost in semifinals, 1–4 (Rangers)
1950–51	1950–51	—	—	3rd	70	25	30	15	—	65	173	184	11	5	6	—	23	25	Won in semifinals, 4–2 (Red Wings); Lost in Stanley Cup Final, 1–4 (Maple Leafs)
1951–52	1951–52	—	—	2nd	70	34	26	10	—	78	195	164	11	4	7	—	20	23	Won in semifinals, 4–3 (Bruins); Lost in Stanley Cup Final, 0–4 (Red Wings)
1952–53	1952–53	—	—	2nd	70	28	23	19	—	75	155	148	12	8	4	—	34	23	Won in semifinals, 4–3 (Black Hawks); Won in Stanley Cup Final, 4–1 (Bruins)†
1953–54	1953–54	—	—	2nd	70	35	24	11	—	81	195	141	11	7	4	—	28	18	Won in semifinals, 4–0 (Bruins); Lost in Stanley Cup Final, 3–4 (Red Wings)
1954–55	1954–55	—	—	2nd	70	41	18	11	—	93	228	157	12	7	5	—	36	36	Won in semifinals, 4–1 (Bruins); Lost in Stanley Cup Final, 3–4 (Red Wings)
1955–56	1955–56	—	—	1st	70	45	15	10	—	100#	222	131	10	8	2	—	42	18	Won in semifinals, 4–1 (Rangers); Won in Stanley Cup Final, 4–1 (Red Wings)†
1956–57	1956–57	—	—	2nd	70	35	23	12	—	82	210	155	10	8	2	—	37	18	Won in semifinals, 4–1 (Rangers); Won in Stanley Cup Final, 4–1 (Bruins)†
1957–58	1957–58	—	—	1st	70	43	17	10	—	96#	250	158	10	8	2	—	35	20	Won in semifinals, 4–0 (Red Wings); Won in Stanley Cup Final, 4–2 (Bruins)†
1958–59	1958–59	—	—	1st	70	39	18	13	—	91#	258	158	11	8	3	—	39	28	Won in semifinals, 4–2 (Black Hawks); Won in Stanley Cup Final, 4–1 (Maple Leafs)†
1959–60	1959–60	—	—	1st	70	40	18	12	—	92#	255	178	8	8	0	—	29	11	Won in semifinals, 4–0 (Black Hawks); Won in Stanley Cup Final, 4–0 (Maple Leafs)†
1960–61	1960–61	—	—	1st	70	41	19	10	—	92#	254	188	6	2	4	—	15	16	Lost in semifinals, 2–4 (Black Hawks)
1961–62	1961–62	—	—	1st	70	42	14	14	—	98#	259	166	6	2	4	—	13	19	Lost in semifinals, 2–4 (Black Hawks)
1962–63	1962–63	—	—	3rd	70	28	19	23	—	79	225	183	5	1	4	—	6	14	Lost in semifinals, 1–4 (Maple Leafs)
1963–64	1963–64	—	—	1st	70	36	21	13	—	85#	209	167	7	3	4	—	14	17	Lost in semifinals, 3–4 (Maple Leafs)
1964–65	1964–65	—	—	2nd	70	36	23	11	—	83	211	185	13	8	5	—	35	26	Won in semifinals, 4–2 (Maple Leafs); Won in Stanley Cup Final, 4–3 (Black Hawks)†
1965–66	1965–66	—	—	1st	70	41	21	8	—	90#	239	173	10	8	2	—	33	20	Won in semifinals, 4–0 (Maple Leafs); Won in Stanley Cup Final, 4–2 (Red Wings)†
1966–67	1966–67	—	—	2nd	70	32	25	13	—	77	202	188	10	6	4	—	30	25	Won in semifinals, 4–0 (Rangers); Lost in Stanley Cup Final, 2–4 (Maple Leafs)
1967–68	1967–68	—	East↑^{[m]}	1st	74	42	22	10	—	94#	236	167	13	12	1	—	48	25	Won in quarterfinals, 4–0 (Bruins); Won in semifinals, 4–1 (Black Hawks); Won in Stanley Cup Final, 4–0 (Blues)†
1968–69	1968–69	—	East↑	1st	76	46	19	11	—	103#	271	202	14	12	2	—	43	26	Won in quarterfinals, 4–0 (Rangers); Won in semifinals, 4–2 (Bruins); Won in Stanley Cup Final, 4–0 (Blues)†
1969–70	1969–70	—	East	5th	76	38	22	16	—	92	244	201	—	—	—	—	—	—	Did not qualify
1970–71	1970–71	—	East	3rd	78	42	23	13	—	97	291	216	20	12	8	—	75	63	Won in quarterfinals, 4–3 (Bruins); Won in semifinals, 4–2 (North Stars); Won in Stanley Cup Final, 4–3 (Black Hawks)†
1971–72	1971–72	—	East	3rd	78	46	16	16	—	108	307	205	6	2	4	—	14	19	Lost in quarterfinals, 2–4 (Rangers)
1972–73	1972–73	—	East↑	1st	78	52	10	16	—	120#	329	184	17	12	5	—	73	52	Won in quarterfinals, 4–2 (Sabres); Won in semifinals, 4–1 (Flyers); Won in Stanley Cup Final, 4–2 (Black Hawks)†
1973–74	1973–74	—	East	2nd	78	45	24	9	—	99	293	240	6	2	4	—	17	21	Lost in quarterfinals, 2–4 (Rangers)
1974–75	1974–75	Wales^{[n]}	Norris↑	1st	80	47	14	19	—	113#	374	225	11	6	5	—	49	30	Won in quarterfinals, 4–1 (Canucks); Lost in semifinals, 2–4 (Sabres)
1975–76	1975–76	Wales‡^{[o]}	Norris↑	1st	80	58	11	11	—	127#	337	174	13	12	1	—	44	26	Won in quarterfinals, 4–0 (Black Hawks); Won in semifinals, 4–1 (Islanders); Won in Stanley Cup Final, 4–0 (Flyers)†
1976–77	1976–77	Wales‡	Norris↑	1st	80	60	8	12	—	132#	387	171	14	12	2	—	54	23	Won in quarterfinals, 4–0 (Blues); Won in semifinals, 4–2 (Islanders); Won in Stanley Cup Final, 4–0 (Bruins)†
1977–78	1977–78	Wales‡	Norris↑	1st	80	59	10	11	—	129#	359	183	15	12	3	—	58	29	Won in quarterfinals, 4–1 (Red Wings); Won in semifinals, 4–0 (Maple Leafs); Won in Stanley Cup Final, 4–2 (Bruins)†
1978–79	1978–79	Wales‡	Norris↑	1st	80	52	17	11	—	115	337	204	16	12	4	—	63	41	Won in quarterfinals, 4–0 (Maple Leafs); Won in semifinals, 4–3 (Bruins); Won in Stanley Cup Final, 4–1 (Rangers)†
1979–80	1979–80	Wales	Norris↑	1st	80	47	20	13	—	107	328	240	10	6	4	—	39	26	Won in preliminary round, 3–0 (Whalers); Lost in quarterfinals, 3–4 (North Stars)
1980–81	1980–81	Wales‡	Norris↑	1st	80	45	22	13	—	103	332	232	3	0	3	—	6	15	Lost in preliminary round, 0–3 (Oilers)
1981–82	1981–82	Wales	Adams↑^{[p]}	1st	80	46	17	17	—	109	360	223	5	2	3	—	16	11	Lost in division semifinals, 2–3 (Nordiques)
1982–83	1982–83	Wales	Adams	2nd	80	42	24	14	—	98	350	286	3	0	3	—	2	8	Lost in division semifinals, 0–3 (Sabres)
1983–84	1983–84	Wales	Adams	4th	80	35	40	5	—	75	286	295	15	9	6	—	42	32	Won in division semifinals, 3–0 (Bruins); Won in division finals, 4–2 (Nordiques); Lost in conference finals, 2–4 (Islanders)
1984–85	1984–85	Wales	Adams↑	1st	80	41	27	12	—	94	309	262	12	6	6	—	43	41	Won in division semifinals, 3–2 (Bruins); Lost division finals, 3–4 (Nordiques)
1985–86	1985–86	Wales‡^{[q]}	Adams	2nd	80	40	33	7	—	87	330	280	20	15	5	—	56	41	Won in division semifinals, 3–0 (Bruins); Won in division finals, 4–3 (Whalers); Won in conference finals, 4–1 (Rangers); Won in Stanley Cup Final, 4–1 (Flames)†
1986–87	1986–87	Wales	Adams	2nd	80	41	29	10	—	92	277	241	17	10	7	—	67	54	Won in division semifinals, 4–0 (Bruins); Won in division finals, 4–3 (Nordiques); Lost in conference finals, 2–4 (Flyers)
1987–88	1987–88	Wales	Adams↑	1st	80	45	22	13	—	103	298	238	11	5	6	—	33	35	Won in division semifinals, 4–2 (Whalers); Lost in division finals, 1–4 (Bruins)
1988–89	1988–89	Wales‡	Adams↑	1st	80	53	18	9	—	115	315	218	21	14	7	—	67	51	Won in division semifinals, 4–0 (Whalers); Won in division finals, 4–1 (Bruins); Won in conference finals, 4–2 (Flyers); Lost in Stanley Cup Final, 2–4 (Flames)
1989–90	1989–90	Wales	Adams	3rd	80	41	28	11	—	93	288	234	11	5	6	—	29	29	Won in division semifinals, 4–2 (Sabres); Lost in division finals, 1–4 (Bruins)
1990–91	1990–91	Wales	Adams	2nd	80	39	30	11	—	89	273	249	13	7	6	—	47	42	Won in division semifinals, 4–2 (Sabres); Lost in division finals, 3–4 (Bruins)
1991–92	1991–92	Wales	Adams↑	1st	80	41	28	11	—	93	267	207	11	4	7	—	29	32	Won in division semifinals, 4–3 (Whalers); Lost division finals, 0–4 (Bruins)
1992–93	1992–93	Wales‡	Adams	3rd	84	48	30	6	—	102	326	280	20	16	4	—	66	51	Won in division semifinals, 4–2 (Nordiques); Won in division finals, 4–0 (Sabres); Won in conference finals, 4–1 (Islanders); Won in Stanley Cup Final, 4–1 (Kings)†
1993–94	1993–94	Eastern^{[r]}	Northeast	3rd	84	41	29	14	—	96	283	248	7	3	4	—	20	22	Lost in conference quarterfinals, 3–4 (Bruins)
1994–95^{[s]}	1994–95	Eastern	Northeast	6th	48	18	23	7	—	43	125	148	—	—	—	—	—	—	Did not qualify
1995–96	1995–96	Eastern	Northeast	3rd	82	40	32	10	—	90	265	248	6	2	4	—	17	19	Lost in conference quarterfinals, 2–4 (Rangers)
1996–97	1996–97	Eastern	Northeast	4th	82	31	36	15	—	77	249	276	5	1	4	—	11	22	Lost in conference quarterfinals, 1–4 (Devils)
1997–98	1997–98	Eastern	Northeast	4th	82	37	32	13	—	87	235	208	10	4	6	—	28	32	Won in conference quarterfinals, 4–2 (Penguins); Lost in conference semifinals, 0–4 (Sabres)
1998–99	1998–99	Eastern	Northeast	5th	82	32	39	11	—	75	184	209	—	—	—	—	—	—	Did not qualify
1999–2000	1999–2000	Eastern	Northeast	4th	82	35	34	9	4^{[t]}	83	196	194	—	—	—	—	—	—	Did not qualify
2000–01	2000–01	Eastern	Northeast	5th	82	28	40	8	6	70	206	232	—	—	—	—	—	—	Did not qualify
2001–02	2001–02	Eastern	Northeast	4th	82	36	31	12	3	87	207	209	12	6	6	—	32	39	Won in conference quarterfinals, 4–2 (Bruins); Lost in conference semifinals, 2–4 (Hurricanes)
2002–03	2002–03	Eastern	Northeast	4th	82	30	35	8	9	77	206	234	—	—	—	—	—	—	Did not qualify
2003–04	2003–04	Eastern	Northeast	4th	82	41	30	7	4	93	208	192	11	4	7	—	24	28	Won in conference quarterfinals, 4–3 (Bruins); Lost in conference semifinals, 0–4 (Lightning)
2004–05^{[u]}	2004–05	Season cancelled due to 2004–05 NHL lockout																	
2005–06	2005–06	Eastern	Northeast	3rd	82	42	31	—^{[v]}	9	93	243	247	6	2	4	—	17	15	Lost in conference quarterfinals, 2–4 (Hurricanes)
2006–07	2006–07	Eastern	Northeast	4th	82	42	34	—	6	90	245	256	—	—	—	—	—	—	Did not qualify
2007–08	2007–08	Eastern	Northeast↑	1st	82	47	25	—	10	104	262	222	12	5	7	—	33	35	Won in conference quarterfinals, 4–3 (Bruins); Lost in conference semifinals, 1–4 (Flyers)
2008–09	2008–09	Eastern	Northeast	2nd	82	41	30	—	11	93	249	247	4	0	4	—	6	17	Lost in conference quarterfinals, 0–4 (Bruins)
2009–10	2009–10	Eastern	Northeast	4th	82	39	33	—	10	88	217	223	19	9	10	—	46	57	Won in conference quarterfinals, 4–3 (Capitals); Won in conference semifinals, 4–3 (Penguins); Lost in conference finals, 1–4 (Flyers)
2010–11	2010–11	Eastern	Northeast	2nd	82	44	30	—	8	96	216	209	7	3	4	—	17	17	Lost in conference quarterfinals, 3–4 (Bruins)
2011–12	2011–12	Eastern	Northeast	5th	82	31	35	—	16	78	212	226	—	—	—	—	—	—	Did not qualify
2012–13^{[w]}	2012–13	Eastern	Northeast↑	1st	48	29	14	—	5	63	149	126	5	1	4	—	9	20	Lost in conference quarterfinals, 1–4 (Senators)
2013–14	2013–14	Eastern	Atlantic^{[x]}	3rd	82	46	28	—	8	100	215	204	17	10	7	—	51	46	Won in first round, 4–0 (Lightning); Won in second round, 4–3 (Bruins); Lost in conference finals, 2–4 (Rangers)
2014–15	2014–15	Eastern	Atlantic↑	1st	82	50	22	—	10	110	221	189	12	6	6	—	25	29	Won in first round, 4–2 (Senators); Lost in second round, 2–4 (Lightning)
2015–16	2015–16	Eastern	Atlantic	6th	82	38	38	—	6	82	221	236	—	—	—	—	—	—	Did not qualify
2016–17	2016–17	Eastern	Atlantic↑	1st	82	47	26	—	9	103	226	200	6	2	4	—	11	14	Lost in first round, 2–4 (Rangers)
2017–18	2017–18	Eastern	Atlantic	6th	82	29	40	—	13	71	209	264	—	—	—	—	—	—	Did not qualify
2018–19	2018–19	Eastern	Atlantic	4th	82	44	30	—	8	96	249	236	—	—	—	—	—	—	Did not qualify
2019–20^{[y]}	2019–20	Eastern	Atlantic	5th	71	31	31	—	9	71	212	221	10	5	5	—	23	19	Won in qualifying round, 3–1 (Penguins); Lost in first round, 2–4 (Flyers)
2020–21^{[z]}	2020–21	—	North	4th	56	24	21	—	11	59	159	168	22	13	9	—	51	54	Won in first round, 4–3 (Maple Leafs); Won in second round, 4–0 (Jets); Won in Stanley Cup semifinals, 4–2 (Golden Knights); Lost in Stanley Cup Final, 1–4 (Lightning)
2021–22	2021–22	Eastern	Atlantic	8th	82	22	49	—	11	55	221	319	—	—	—	—	—	—	Did not qualify
2022–23	2022–23	Eastern	Atlantic	8th	82	31	45	—	6	68	232	307	—	—	—	—	—	—	Did not qualify
2023–24	2023–24	Eastern	Atlantic	8th	82	30	36	—	16	76	236	289	—	—	—	—	—	—	Did not qualify
2024–25	2024–25	Eastern	Atlantic	5th	82	40	31	—	11	91	245	265	5	1	4	—	12	18	Lost in first round, 1–4 (Capitals)
2025–26	2025–26	Eastern	Atlantic	3rd	82	48	24	—	10	106	283	256	19	9	10	—	54	56	Won in first round, 4–3 (Lightning); Won in second round, 4–3 (Sabres); Lost in conference finals, 1–4 (Hurricanes)
Totals					7,197	3,644	2,487	837	229	8,354	22,920	19,609	792	450	335	8	2,356	2,016	87 playoff appearances

=== Notes ===
- ^{d} From the 1917–18 season to the 1920–21 season, the NHL played a split season schedule. The winners of both halves faced each other in a two-game, total-goals series for the NHL championship.
- ^{e} From the 1917–18 season to the 1925–26 season, the NHL had no divisions.
- ^{f} From the 1917–18 season to the 1926–27 season, the O'Brien Cup was awarded to the champion of the NHL.
- ^{g} The 1919 Stanley Cup Final were suspended due to the 1918 flu pandemic.
- ^{h} The NHL declared the Canadiens to be league champions in 1925 when the Hamilton Tigers refused to play in the NHL Finals due to a dispute over player salaries.
- ^{i} From the 1926–27 season to the 1937–38 season, the Canadiens played in the Canadian Division.
- ^{j} From the 1927–28 season to the 1937–38 season, the O'Brien Cup was awarded to the champion of the Canadian Division.
- ^{k} From the 1938–39 season to the 1966–67 season, the NHL had no divisions.
- ^{l} From the 1938–39 season to the 1949–50 season, the O'Brien Cup was awarded to the NHL playoff runner-up, and was retired after the 1949–50 season.
- ^{m} Before the 1967–68 season, the NHL split into East and West Divisions because of the addition of six expansion teams.
- ^{n} The NHL realigned before the 1974–75 season. The Canadiens were placed in the Prince of Wales Conference's Norris Division.
- ^{o} Between 1974–75 and 1980–81, Conference championships were awarded to the team that finished first overall in their respective conference in the regular season.
- ^{p} Before the 1981–82 season, the NHL moved the Canadiens to the Adams Division.
- ^{q} Since 1981–82, Conference championships are awarded to the team that wins the conference finals in their respective conference in the postseason.
- ^{r} The NHL realigned into Eastern and Western conferences prior to the 1993–94 season. Montreal was placed in the Northeast Division of the Eastern Conference.
- ^{s} The season was shortened to 48 games because of the 1994–95 NHL lockout.
- ^{t} Beginning with the 1999–2000 season, teams received one point for losing a regular-season game in overtime.
- ^{u} The season was cancelled because of the 2004–05 NHL lockout.
- ^{v} Before the 2005–06 season, the NHL instituted a penalty shootout for regular-season games that remained tied after a five-minute overtime period, which prevented ties.
- ^{w} The season was shortened to 48 games because of the 2012–13 NHL lockout.
- ^{x} The NHL realigned prior to the 2013–14 season. The Canadiens were placed in the Atlantic Division of the Eastern Conference.
- ^{y} The season was suspended on March 12, 2020 because of the COVID-19 pandemic. The top 24 teams in the league qualified for the playoffs.
- ^{z} Due to the COVID-19 pandemic, the 2020–21 NHL season was shortened to 56 games.

== Totals from all seasons ==
Montreal Canadiens NHA and NHL regular season and postseason statistics, 1910–present
	Regular season								Postseason					
	GP	W	L	T	OT	PTS	GF	GA	GP	W	L	T	GF	GA
NHA totals	150	72	77	1	—	145	610	611	13	6	7	0	35	48
NHL totals	7,197	3,644	2,487	837	229	8,354	22,920	19,609	792	450	335	8	2,356	2,016
Grand totals	7,347	3,716	2,564	838	229	8,499	23,530	20,220	805	457	340	8	2,388	2,055
All-time NHL playoff series record: 98–63–1
