= 1914–15 Montreal Canadiens season =

NHA hockey team season

1914–15 Montreal Canadiens
- League: 6th NHA
- 1914–15 record: 6–14–0
- Goals for: 65
- Goals against: 81

Team information
- General manager: George Kennedy
- Coach: Jimmy Gardner
- Captain: Newsy Lalonde
- Arena: Jubilee Rink

Team leaders
- Goals: Didier Pitre (30)
- Goals against average: Georges Vezina (4.1)

The 1914–15 Montreal Canadiens season was the team's sixth season and sixth of the National Hockey Association (NHA). After finishing first in 1913–14, the club posted a 6–14 record and fell to last place in the league and missed the playoffs for the first time since the 1912–13 season.

== Regular season ==
Five new players joined the Canadiens in 1914–15: Albert Corbeau, Jack Fournier, Nick Bawlf, Ed Lowrey and Marcel Beliveau. Didier Pitre returns to the Canadiens from Vancouver after a cash deal with the Millionaires. Newsy Lalonde holds out in a contract dispute, prompting the team to penalize him $100 per week. After Lalonde returns in January, he plays poorly and is suspended by the team again. He only plays seven games of the season.

On January 13 in a game versus Quebec, Georges Vezina is penalized and tossed from the game for hitting Joe Hall. With the Bulldogs behind 2–1, Jack Laviolette takes over in goal, and Quebec ties the game. As was then permitted, Vezina returns in extra play, only to surrender the third Quebec goal in a game that went on record as the longest overtime to that point, taking fifty minutes and 28 seconds to settle the contest.

=== Final standings ===
National Hockey Association
| | GP | W | L | T | GF | GA |
|---|---|---|---|---|---|---|
| Ottawa Senators | 20 | 14 | 6 | 0 | 74 | 65 |
| Montreal Wanderers | 20 | 14 | 6 | 0 | 127 | 82 |
| Quebec Bulldogs | 20 | 11 | 9 | 0 | 85 | 85 |
| Toronto Hockey Club | 20 | 8 | 12 | 0 | 66 | 84 |
| Toronto Ontarios-Shamrocks | 20 | 7 | 13 | 0 | 76 | 96 |
| Montreal Canadiens | 20 | 6 | 14 | 0 | 65 | 81 |

Note: W = Wins, L = Losses, T = Ties, GF= Goals For, GA = Goals Against

=== Results ===
| Month | Day | Visitor | Score | Home | Score |
|---|---|---|---|---|---|
| Dec. | 26 | Toronto | 4 | Canadiens | 3 |
| Dec. | 30 | Quebec | 8 | Canadiens | 7 |
| Jan. | 2 | Canadiens | 1 | Ontarios | 4 |
| Jan. | 6 | Ottawa | 4 | Canadiens | 2 |
| Jan. | 9 | Canadiens | 4 | Wanderers | 5 (6'45" OT) |
| Jan. | 13 | Canadiens | 2 | Quebec | 3 (50'20" OT) |
| Jan. | 16 | Ontarios | 7 | Canadiens | 1 |
| Jan. | 20 | Canadiens | 1 | Ottawa | 3 |
| Jan. | 23 | Canadiens | 7 | Wanderers | 2 |
| Jan. | 27 | Canadiens | 1 | Toronto | 2 |
| Jan. | 30 | Ontarios | 3 | Canadiens | 4 |
| Feb. | 3 | Quebec | 2 | Canadiens | 5 |
| Feb. | 6 | Canadiens | 4 | Toronto | 3 |
| Feb. | 10 | Canadiens | 3 | Wanderers | 6 |
| Feb. | 13 | Canadiens | 3 | Ottawa | 5 |
| Feb. | 17 | Canadiens | 2 | Quebec | 6 |
| Feb. | 20 | Toronto | 2 | Canadiens | 7 |
| Feb. | 24 | Ottawa | 2 | Canadiens | 3 |
| Feb. | 27 | Wanderers | 7 | Canadiens | 3 |
| Mar. | 3 | Canadiens | 2 | Ontarios | 3 |

== Playoffs ==
The team did not qualify for the playoffs.

== Transactions ==
- In November, Didier Pitre returned to Montreal from the Vancouver Millionaires for cash.
- In February, Donald Smith is traded to the Wanderers for cash.

== See also ==
- 1914–15 NHA season
