= Charlie Uksila =

American hockey player

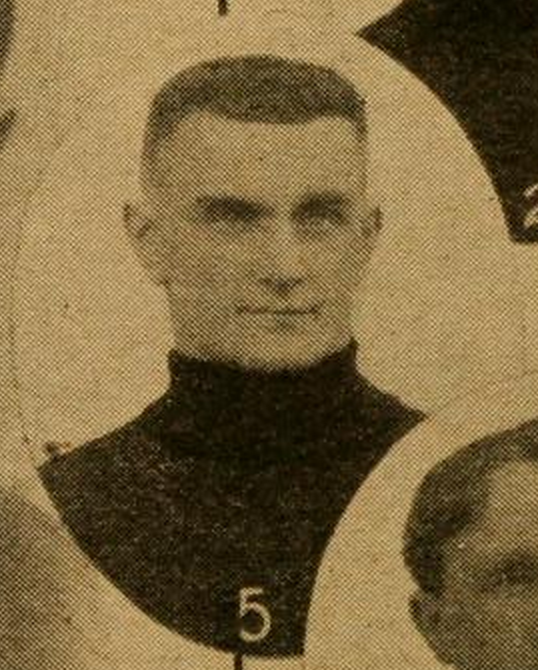
- Born: October 12, 1887 Calumet, MI, USA
- Died: March 4, 1964 (aged 76) Mountain View, CA, USA
- Height: 5 ft 6 in (168 cm)
- Weight: 150 lb (68 kg; 10 st 10 lb)
- Position: Left wing
- Shot: Left
- Played for: Portland Rosebuds; Vancouver Millionaires
- Playing career: 1907–1919

Charles Uksila, Jr. (October 12, 1887 – March 4, 1964) was an American professional hockey player. He played for the Portland Rosebuds and Vancouver Millionaires of the Pacific Coast Hockey Association. He was a native of Calumet, Michigan, where he started his hockey career. Prior to playing with Portland, he was a member of the Multnomah Amateur Athletic Club. He was a member of the Rosebuds team that played the Montreal Canadiens in the 1916 Stanley Cup Final.

Uksila retired from professional hockey after the 1918–19 season, and then worked as a fancy skating instructor at the Connaught Skating Club in Vancouver. He also toured in Australia where he performed as a figure skater alongside his sister in Sydney and Melbourne.

He died in Mountain View, California, in 1964. He was of Finnish descent.
