= List of PCHA seasons =

Can-Am pro ice hockey league seasons (1912–24)

This is a list of seasons for the Pacific Coast Hockey Association professional men's ice hockey league, which existed from 1912 to 1924.

== Teams ==
Season	Teams	Champion	References
1912	New Westminster Royals, Vancouver Millionaires, Victoria Aristocrats	New Westminster Royals	
1912–13	New Westminster Royals, Vancouver Millionaires, Victoria Aristocrats	Victoria Aristocrats	
1913-14	New Westminster Royals, Vancouver Millionaires, Victoria Aristocrats	Victoria Aristocrats	
1914–15	Portland Rosebuds, Vancouver Millionaires, Victoria Aristocrats	Vancouver Millionaires (Note: Stanley Cup Champion)	(Note: The 1915 Stanley Cup Final was the first organized as a pre-scheduled playoff between the two teams that won that year's PCHA and National Hockey Association (NHA) league championships, a one-off arrangement agreed to by the Stanley Cup trustee. Before this, individual teams would file with the Stanley Cup trustee with an official challenge to face the existing Cup holder. The following year, the Stanley Cup trustee deemed this league-vs-league format would be an ongoing arrangement.)
1915–16	Portland Rosebuds, Seattle Metropolitans, Vancouver Millionaires, Victoria Aristocrats	Portland Rosebuds	(Note: Portland was the regular-season PCHA champion, but did not claim the Stanley Cup. As Portland had not defeated Cup holder Vancouver of the PCHA in a direct playoff showdown, they could not claim the Cup. Instead, the new Cup holder was determined at the pre-arranged 1916 Stanley Cup Final between the champions of the PCHA and NHA. The PCHA's Portland-based champion made this the first Cup Final to feature a non-Canadian finalist.)
1916–17	Portland Rosebuds, Seattle Metropolitans, Vancouver Millionaires, Spokane Canaries	Seattle Metropolitans	(Note: PCHA champion Seattle's victory at the 1917 Stanley Cup Final marked the first time a non-Canadian team won the Cup.)
1917–18	Portland Rosebuds, Seattle Metropolitans, Vancouver Millionaires	Vancouver Millionaires	(Note: Two-game playoff against Seattle) (Note: Vancouver claimed the Stanley Cup by defeating existing cup holder Seattle in the playoffs, but lost in the scheduled Cup Final to Toronto, champions of the new National Hockey League (NHL). The format of a league's playoffs determining the passing of the Stanley Cup had been the norm during the Challenge Cup era of 1893–1914. Vancouver's claim to the Cup in 1917 would be the last time a claim of this type was used. This was the first Cup Final held after the NHA suspended operations in order to get rid of unwanted owner Eddie Livingstone, with the remaining NHA team owners creating the NHL.)
1919	Seattle Metropolitans, Vancouver Millionaires, Victoria Aristocrats	Seattle Metropolitans	(Note: Two-game playoff against Vancouver)
1919–20	Seattle Metropolitans, Vancouver Millionaires, Victoria Aristocrats	Seattle Metropolitans	
1920–21	Seattle Metropolitans, Vancouver Millionaires, Victoria Aristocrats	Vancouver Millionaires	
1921–22	Seattle Metropolitans, Vancouver Millionaires, Victoria Aristocrats	Vancouver Millionaires	
1922–23	Seattle Metropolitans, Vancouver Maroons, Victoria Aristocrats	Vancouver Maroons	(Note: Two-game playoff against Victoria)
1923–24	Seattle Metropolitans, Vancouver Maroons, Victoria Cougars	Vancouver Maroons	

== See also ==
- List of Stanley Cup champions
