= 1916 Stanley Cup Final =

1916 ice hockey championship series

	1	2	3	4	5	Total
Montreal Canadiens (NHA)	0	2	6	5	2	3
Portland Rosebuds (PCHA)	2	1	3	6	1	2
- Location(s): Montreal: Montreal Arena
- Format: best-of-five
- Coaches: Montreal: Newsy Lalonde; Portland: Edward Savage (mgr.)
- Referees: Harvey Pulford, J. Brennan
- Dates: March 20–30, 1916
- Series-winning goal: Goldie Prodger (17:20, third)
- Hall of Famers: Canadiens: Newsy Lalonde (1950); Jack Laviolette (1963); Didier Pitre (1963); Georges Vezina (1945); Rosebuds: Tommy Dunderdale (1974); Moose Johnson (1952); Coaches: Newsy Lalonde (1950, player)

The 1916 Stanley Cup Final was played between the National Hockey Association (NHA) champion Montreal Canadiens and the Pacific Coast Hockey Association (PCHA) champion Portland Rosebuds. This was the first time that a best-of-five Cup championship went the distance. Also, the Rosebuds were the first team based in the United States to play for the Cup. Stanley Cup trustees ruled before the Stanley Cup Final that the Stanley Cup as the World professional hockey championship can not be limited to just Canadian teams. The Canadiens defeated the Rosebuds three games to two in the best-of-five-game series. This was the Canadiens' first Stanley Cup championship.

== Paths to the Final ==
Montreal won the NHA title after finishing the 1915–16 regular season in first place with a 16–7–1 record. Meanwhile, Portland clinched the 1915–16 PCHA title with a 13–5 record.

== Game summaries ==
The games of the series were played at Montreal's Montreal Arena as it was the turn of the NHA champions to host the series. Games one, three and five were played under NHA rules; Games two and four were played under PCHA rules. Ernie Johnson's share of series revenues was by court order to be paid to the Montreal Wanderers, whom he had left while under contract to go to the PCHA. For the entire series, future Hockey Hall of Fame goaltender Georges Vezina aided Montreal by posting a 2.60 goals-against average. Didier Pitre led the Canadiens in scoring with 4 goals.

Montreal Canadiens NHA champions Roster - Georges Veznia goalie, Howard McNamara (Captain) point, Bert Corbeau cover point, Didier Pitre center-rover, Edouard "Newsy" Lalonde (Playing-Coach) center, George "Goldie" Prodgers right wing-left wing, Jack Laviolettte left wing, Amous Arbour left wing, Louis Berlinguette left wing, Georges "Skinner" Poulin center, Eskene “Skene” Ronan center right wing, spare Jack Fournier right wing-left wing - U.P. Boudier (President), George "Kennedy", Kendall (Manager-owner).

Portland Rosebuds PCAH champions Roster - Tommy Murray goalie, Del Irvine point, Ernie "Moose" Johnson cover point, Fred "Smokey" Harris rover-left wing, Tommy Dunderdale center, Eddie Oatman right wing, Charles Tobin left wing-right wing, Charlie Uksilla left wing, Alf Barbour center, C.D. Doherty (President), Edward Savage (Manager-Coach).

=== Game one ===
March 20	Montreal Canadiens	0–2	Portland Rosebuds	Montreal Arena

Portland arrived by train the day before the game but showed no weariness, recording a shutout despite game one being played under Eastern Rules (6 a side). It was noted that Portland's speedy backchecking limited Montreal to only 6 chances.

=== Game two ===
March 22	Montreal Canadiens	2–1	Portland Rosebuds	Montreal Arena

Despite missing Newsy Lalonde (bad cold) and Jack Laviolette (broken jaw), Montreal behind some heavy checking defeated Portland 2–1 to tie the series under Western PCHA rules (7 a side).

=== Game three ===
March 25	Montreal Canadiens	6–3	Portland Rosebuds	Montreal Arena

Lalonde and Laviolette played in game three. Lalonde got into a fight with Ernie Johnson, requiring the police to break up the fight. Lalonde and Laviolette were ejected for the game and Eddie Oatman received a major penalty. Pitre was the scoring star, scoring three goals to lead the Canadiens to a 6–3 victory. Eastern rules were used.

=== Game four ===
March 28	Montreal Canadiens	5–6	Portland Rosebuds	Montreal Arena

The Rosebuds then evened the series with a 6–5 victory in game four. The Rosebuds took a 3–0 lead, only to see the Canadiens tie it and take a 4–3 lead. In the third period Portland's Fred Harris scored twice and Charlie Uksilla scored once to take a 6–4 lead until the last minute when Lalonde scored to make it closer. Western rules were used.

=== Game five ===
March 30	Montreal Canadiens	2–1	Portland Rosebuds	Montreal Arena

In game five, Portland's Tommy Dunderdale gave his team a 1–0 lead before Skene Ronan tied the game. The seldom-used George Prodgers then scored the game and series-winning goal to clinch the Cup for the Canadiens. Eastern rules were used.

== Stanley Cup engraving ==
The 1916 Stanley Cup was presented by the trophy's trustee William Foran to the Montreal Canadiens.

The following Canadiens players and staff were members of the Stanley Cup winning team.

1915–16 Montreal Canadiens

=== Players ===
Centres

- 4 Edouard Newsy Lalonde‡ (coach)
- 5 Didier Pitre‡
- 6 George Skinner Poulin
- 12 Skene Ronan^

Wingers

- 11 Amos Arbour
- 9 Louis Berlinguette
- 10 Jack Fournier
- 7 Jack Laviolette

Defencemen

- 2 Bert Corbeau
- 3 Howard McNamara (captain)
- 8 George "Goldie" Prodgers

Goaltenders

- 1 Georges Vezina

‡ also played rover in the Stanley Cup Final

=== Coaching and administrative staff ===
- U. P. Boucher* (President)
- George Kennedy (Owner/Manager/Treasurer)
- Napoléon Dorval (Secretary)
- S. Newsworthy* (Trainer), Aldrie Guiment (Ass't Trainer).

=== Stanley Cup engraving ===
Although the Rosebuds did not win the series, the Rosebuds had the words "Portland Ore./PCHA Champions/1915–16" engraved on the Cup after obtaining the trophy from the previous year's champions, the Vancouver Millionaires. This was consistent with the practice at the time that the trophy was passed on to the winner of the league championship of the previous Cup champion's league. Portland is thus the only city not to win the Cup outright to be listed as champions on the Stanley Cup.

After the series, "Canadian/NHA & World's Champions/Defeated Portland/1915–16" was added to the Cup (Note that the anglicized, singular form of "Canadiens" was engraved).

- *-one non-player's first name is missing. U.P. Boulder's President's last is often mispelt U.P Boucher.

== See also ==
- 1915–16 Montreal Canadiens season
- 1915–16 NHA season
- 1915–16 PCHA season
- List of Stanley Cup champions

Preceded by Vancouver Millionaires; 1915	Montreal Canadiens; Stanley Cup champions 1916	Succeeded by Seattle Metropolitans; 1917
