= Dallaire =

Dallaire is a surname. Notable people with the surname include:

- André Dallaire, Canadian attempted assassin
- Claude Dallaire (born 1960), Canadian weightlifter
- Hector Dallaire, Canadian professional ice hockey player
- Jean Dallaire, Canadian painter
- Roméo Dallaire, Canadian humanitarian, author and retired senator and general
