= Alf Barbour =

Canadian ice hockey player (1891–1953)

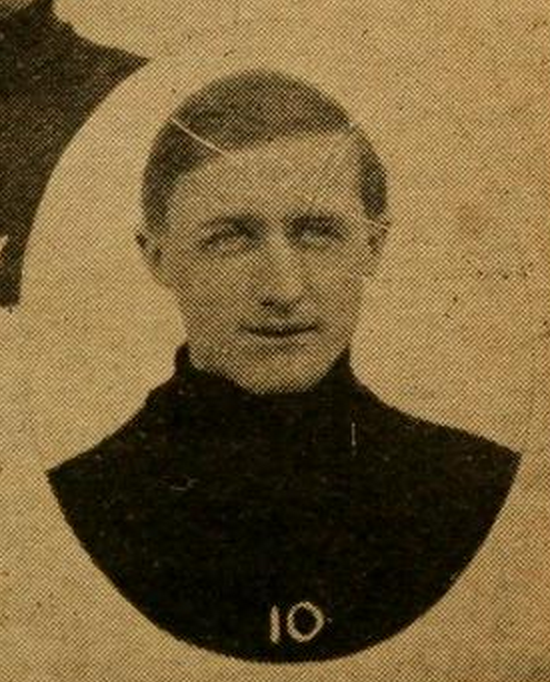
- Born: June 1, 1891 Souris, Manitoba, Canada
- Died: May 13, 1953 (aged 61) Calgary, Alberta, Canada
- Height: 6 ft 0 in (183 cm)
- Weight: 170 lb (77 kg; 12 st 2 lb)
- Position: Rover
- Played for: Portland Rosebuds; Victoria Aristocrats
- Playing career: 1908–1923

James Alfred Barbour (June 1, 1891 – May 13, 1953) was a Canadian ice hockey player who played in various professional and amateur leagues between about 1910 and 1930.

== Career ==
Alf Barbour played for the Taber Cooks (five players had the surname Cook and were sometimes called the Taber Chefs) on the 1912 and 1913 Alberta provincial champion teams. In 1915 Barbour took a job in Blairmore, Alberta as a pharmacist, earning his nickname 'Doc', and played competitive amateur hockey there. Between 1915 and 1918 Barbour played for the Portland Rosebuds of the Pacific Coast Hockey Association, and was on the first American team to play in a Stanley Cup Finals. He married Lula Beck of Coleman, Alberta in 1916.

In 1919 Barbour played his last professional season with the Victoria Aristocrats. In 1920 Barbour purchased a pharmacy in Bellevue, Alberta and was captain of the Bellevue Bulldogs in the 1920s. Despite a leg injury in a 1923 hockey game, Barbour continued to play and referee until 1934 when he sold his pharmacy and moved to Creston, BC.

He died in Calgary in 1953, aged 61.
