= 1916–17 Montreal Canadiens season =

NHA hockey team season

1916–17 Montreal Canadiens
- NHA champions
- O'Brien Trophy winners
- League: 1st (1st half), 3rd (2nd half) NHA
- 1916–17 record: 7–3–0 (1st half), 3–7–0 (2nd half)
- Goals for: 104
- Goals against: 76

Team information
- General manager: George Kennedy
- Coach: Newsy Lalonde
- Captain: Newsy Lalonde
- Arena: Montreal Arena

Team leaders
- Goals: Newsy Lalonde (27)
- Goals against average: Georges Vezina (4.0)

The 1916–17 Montreal Canadiens season was the team's eighth season and eighth and last season of the National Hockey Association (NHA). The Canadiens entered the season as league and Stanley Cup champions. The Canadiens qualified for the playoffs by winning the first half of the season. The Canadiens then won the league playoff to win their second league championship, but lost in the Stanley Cup Final series to Seattle.

== Regular season ==
Harold McNamara, who had played for Cobalt in the Canadiens' first game in 1910, joined the Canadiens for this season. He would be released after the first two games and he would retire afterwards.

=== Final standings ===
National Hockey Association
First Half	GP	W	L	T	GF	GA
Montreal Canadiens	10	7	3	0	58	38
Ottawa Senators	10	7	3	0	56	41
Toronto 228th Battalion	10	6	4	0	70	57
Toronto Hockey Club	10	5	5	0	50	45
Montreal Wanderers	10	3	7	0	56	72
Quebec Bulldogs	10	2	8	0	43	80

Second Half	GP	W	L	T	GF	GA
Ottawa Senators	10	8	2	0	63	22
Quebec Bulldogs	10	8	2	0	54	46
Montreal Canadiens	10	3	7	0	31	42
Montreal Wanderers	10	2	8	0	38	65

Note: W = Wins, L = Losses, T = Ties, GF= Goals For, GA = Goals Against
After the 228th Battalion dropped out, and Toronto suspended, the schedule was revised so that the remaining teams would play a 20 game schedule of two halves containing 10 games each. Some of the games to that point were moved into the second half. The 'second half' standings therefore include some games that the 228th and Toronto played.

== Schedule and results ==
First half

Month	Day	Visitor	Score	Home	Score
Dec.	27	Toronto	7	Canadiens	1
Dec.	30	Canadiens	1	Ottawa	7
Jan.	3	Canadiens	4	Quebec	2
Jan.	6	Wanderers	4	Canadiens	9
Jan.	10	228th	1	Canadiens	6
Jan.	13	Canadiens	6	Toronto	2
Jan.	17	Ottawa	3	Canadiens	2
Jan.	20	Quebec	6	Canadiens	10
Jan.	24	Canadiens	10	Wanderers	2
Jan.	27	Canadiens	9	228th	4

Second half

Month	Day	Visitor	Score	Home	Score
Jan.	31	Canadiens	2	Toronto	6
Feb.	3	Ottawa	2	Canadiens	1
Feb.	7	Quebec	3	Canadiens	6
Feb.	10	Canadiens	6	Wanderers	3
Feb.	14	Canadiens	1	Ottawa	4
Feb.	17	Wanderers	3	Canadiens	4
Feb.	21	Canadiens	1	Quebec	5
Feb.	24	Quebec	7	Canadiens	6
Feb.	28	Ottawa	3	Canadiens	1
Mar.	3	Canadiens	3	Wanderers	6

== Playoffs ==
Game-by-game		Winning team	Score	Losing team	Location
1	March 7	Montreal Canadiens	5–2	Ottawa Senators	Montreal Arena
2	March 10	Ottawa Senators	4–2	Montreal Canadiens	The Arena, Ottawa
Canadiens win two-game playoff 7–6 to win the O'Brien Cup.

=== Stanley Cup Final ===
The games of the Cup Final were played at the Seattle Ice Arena. Games 1 and 3 were played under PCHA rules; Games 2 and 4 were played under NHA rules. In game one, Didier Pitre scored 4 goals as he led the Canadiens to an 8–4 victory. But the Mets won the next three contests to clinch the Cup, allowing only one goal in each game.

Game-by-game		Winning team	Score	Losing team	Rules used	Location
1	March 17	Montreal Canadiens	8–4	Seattle Metropolitans	PCHA	Seattle Ice Arena
2	March 20	Seattle Metropolitans	6–1	Montreal Canadiens	NHA	Seattle Ice Arena
3	March 23	Seattle Metropolitans	4–1	Montreal Canadiens	PCHA	Seattle Ice Arena
4	March 26	Seattle Metropolitans	9–1	Montreal Canadiens	NHA	Seattle Ice Arena
Metropolitans win best-of-five series 3 games to 1

== See also ==
- 1916–17 NHA season
- List of Stanley Cup champions
