= 2004–05 Montreal Canadiens season =

NHL hockey team season

2004–05 Montreal Canadiens
- Division: Northeast
- Conference: Eastern
- 2004–05 record: Did not play

Team information
- General manager: Bob Gainey
- Coach: Claude Julien
- Captain: Saku Koivu
- Arena: Bell Centre
- Minor league affiliates: Hamilton Bulldogs; Long Beach Ice Dogs

The 2004–05 Montreal Canadiens season was the team's 96th season, 88th in the National Hockey League (NHL). However, its games were cancelled as the 2004–05 NHL lockout could not be resolved in time. The other 29 teams did not play either due to the labour dispute.

== Schedule ==
The Canadiens preseason and regular season schedules were announced on July 14, 2004.

2004–05 schedule
Preseason

Game	Date	Opponent
1	September 23	Tampa Bay Lightning
2	September 24	Toronto Maple Leafs
3	September 26	Ottawa Senators
4	September 28	Boston Bruins
5	September 29	@ Boston Bruins
6	October 2	Buffalo Sabres
7	October 5	@ Toronto Maple Leafs
8	October 6	@ Buffalo Sabres
9	October 9	@ Ottawa Senators

Regular season

Game	Date	Opponent
1	October 13	@ Ottawa Senators
2	October 16	Philadelphia Flyers
3	October 19	Pittsburgh Penguins
4	October 21	@ Washington Capitals
5	October 23	Toronto Maple Leafs
6	October 26	Carolina Hurricanes
7	October 28	@ Philadelphia Flyers
8	October 30	Atlanta Thrashers
9	November 3	@ Florida Panthers
10	November 5	@ Carolina Hurricanes
11	November 6	@ St. Louis Blues
12	November 9	Washington Capitals
13	November 12	@ Ottawa Senators
14	November 13	Ottawa Senators
15	November 16	Boston Bruins
16	November 17	@ Pittsburgh Penguins
17	November 20	New York Rangers
18	November 24	@ New York Islanders
19	November 26	@ Buffalo Sabres
20	November 27	Boston Bruins
21	November 30	Minnesota Wild
22	December 3	@ New Jersey Devils
23	December 4	@ Boston Bruins
24	December 8	@ Florida Panthers
25	December 9	@ Tampa Bay Lightning
26	December 11	@ Toronto Maple Leafs
27	December 14	Tampa Bay Lightning
28	December 17	@ New Jersey Devils
29	December 18	New Jersey Devils
30	December 21	Buffalo Sabres
31	December 22	@ Buffalo Sabres
32	December 29	@ Vancouver Canucks
33	December 31	@ Calgary Flames
34	January 1	@ Edmonton Oilers
35	January 4	Pittsburgh Penguins
36	January 6	@ Boston Bruins
37	January 8	Florida Panthers
38	January 10	@ New York Rangers
39	January 11	Carolina Hurricanes
40	January 15	Dallas Stars
41	January 17	@ Nashville Predators
42	January 19	@ Colorado Avalanche
43	January 22	Toronto Maple Leafs
44	January 24	Atlanta Thrashers
45	January 26	@ Columbus Blue Jackets
46	January 28	@ Washington Capitals
47	January 29	New York Rangers
48	February 1	Boston Bruins
49	February 3	San Jose Sharks
50	February 5	Los Angeles Kings
51	February 6	New York Islanders
52	February 8	Vancouver Canucks
53	February 10	@ Boston Bruins
54	February 15	Philadelphia Flyers
55	February 17	Edmonton Oilers
56	February 19	Ottawa Senators
57	February 20	@ Philadelphia Flyers
58	February 22	New York Islanders
59	February 24	Florida Panthers
60	February 26	Buffalo Sabres
61	February 27	@ Pittsburgh Penguins
62	March 2	@ Chicago Blackhawks
63	March 3	@ Detroit Red Wings
64	March 5	@ Toronto Maple Leafs
65	March 8	Washington Capitals
66	March 11	@ New York Islanders
67	March 12	Buffalo Sabres
68	March 15	@ Ottawa Senators
69	March 17	@ Carolina Hurricanes
70	March 19	Anaheim Mighty Ducks
71	March 21	Phoenix Coyotes
72	March 23	@ Atlanta Thrashers
73	March 24	@ Tampa Bay Lightning
74	March 26	Calgary Flames
75	March 28	@ New York Rangers
76	March 29	Tampa Bay Lightning
77	March 31	Toronto Maple Leafs
78	April 2	@ Toronto Maple Leafs
79	April 4	New Jersey Devils
80	April 6	@ Atlanta Thrashers
81	April 8	@ Buffalo Sabres
82	April 9	Ottawa Senators

== Transactions ==
The Canadiens were involved in the following transactions from June 8, 2004, the day after the deciding game of the 2004 Stanley Cup Finals, through February 16, 2005, the day the 2004–05 season was officially cancelled.

=== Trades ===
Date	Details		Ref
June 26, 2004	To Montreal Canadiens: Radek Bonk; Cristobal Huet	To Los Angeles Kings: Mathieu Garon; 3rd-round pick in 2004	
June 27, 2004	To Montreal Canadiens: Future considerations	To Los Angeles Kings: Stephane Quintal	

=== Players acquired ===
Date	Player	Former team	Term	Via	Ref
July 16, 2004	Raitis Ivanans	Milwaukee Admirals (AHL)	2-year	Free agency	
July 23, 2004	Gavin Morgan	Dallas Stars	1-year	Free agency	
August 19, 2004	Jean-Philippe Cote	Hamilton Bulldogs (AHL)	2-year	Free agency	
August 24, 2004	Benoit Dusablon	New York Rangers	1-year	Free agency	

=== Players lost ===
Date	Player	New team	Via (Note: In parentheses is the player’s free agency group on July 1 if applicable.)	Ref
June 9, 2004	Benoit Gratton	HC Lugano (NLA)	Free agency (VI)	
July 1, 2004	Yanic Perreault (Note: Perreault was inactive during the 2004–05 season.)		Contract expiration (III)	
July 3, 2004	Darren Langdon	New Jersey Devils	Free agency (III)	
August 11, 2004	Gordie Dwyer	Carolina Hurricanes	Free agency (UFA)	
September 9, 2004	Patrick Traverse	Dallas Stars	Free agency (UFA)	
September 14, 2004	Francois Beauchemin	Columbus Blue Jackets	Waivers	
September 16, 2004	Jean-Francois Damphousse	Quebec RadioX (LNAH)	Free agency (UFA)	
October 1, 2004	Jim Dowd	Hamburg Freezers (DEL)	Free agency (III)	
October 6, 2004	Jerome Marois	Trois-Rivieres Caron & Guay (LNAH)	Free agency (UFA)	
November 13, 2004	Rene Vydareny	HC Slovan Bratislava (SVK)	Free agency (II) (Note: The Canadiens retained Vydareny’s NHL rights through the 2007–08 season.)	
January 13, 2005	Benoit Dusablon		Retirement	
January 25, 2005	Eric Fichaud	Quebec RadioX (LNAH)	Free agency (UFA)	

=== Signings ===
Date	Player	Term	Contract type	Ref
July 14, 2004	Steve Begin	2-year (Note: Club option for a third year.)	Re-signing	
July 14, 2004	Marcel Hossa	1-year	Re-signing	
July 14, 2004	Mike Ribeiro	1-year	Re-signing	
July 14, 2004	Niklas Sundstrom	2-year	Re-signing	
July 19, 2004	Marc-Andre Thinel	1-year	Re-signing	
July 23, 2004	Ron Hainsey	2-year	Re-signing	
July 30, 2004	Radek Bonk	3-year	Re-signing	
August 3, 2004	Cristobal Huet	2-year	Re-signing	
August 4, 2004	Richard Zednik	3-year	Re-signing	
August 10, 2004	Andrei Kostitsyn	3-year	Entry-level	
September 9, 2004	Cory Urquhart	3-year	Entry-level	
September 13, 2004	Sheldon Souray	3-year	Re-signing	
September 15, 2004	Corey Locke	3-year	Entry-level	

== Draft picks ==
The 2004 NHL entry draft was held on June 26 at the RBC Center in Raleigh, North Carolina. It was the last NHL event to take place before the beginning of the lockout which cancelled all the games scheduled for the 2004–05 NHL season.

Montreal selected nine players at the 2004 draft:

Round	Pick	Player	Nationality	Position	College/junior/club team
1	18	Kyle Chipchura	Canada	Centre	Prince Albert Raiders (WHL)
3	84	Alexei Emelin	Russia	Defence	CSK VVS Samara (Russia)
4	100	J. T. Wyman	United States	Right wing	Dartmouth College (NCAA)
5	150	Mikhail Grabovski	Belarus	Centre	Neftekhimik Nizhnekamsk (Russia)
6	181	Loic Lacasse	Canada	Goaltender	Baie-Comeau Drakkar (QMJHL)
7	212	Jon Gleed	Canada	Defence	Cornell University (NCAA)
8	246	Gregory Stewart	Canada	Right wing	Peterborough Petes (OHL)
9	262	Mark Streit	Switzerland	Defence	HC Zürich (Switzerland)
9	278	Alexandre Dulac-Lemelin	Canada	Defence	Baie-Comeau Drakkar (QMJHL)
