= 1915–16 Montreal Canadiens season =

NHA hockey team season

1915–16 Montreal Canadiens
- Stanley Cup champions
- O'Brien Trophy winners
- League: 1st NHA
- 1915–16 record: 16–7–1
- Goals for: 104
- Goals against: 76

Team information
- General manager: George Kennedy
- Coach: Newsy Lalonde
- Captain: Howard McNamara
- Arena: Montreal Arena

Team leaders
- Goals: Newsy Lalonde (31)
- Goals against average: Georges Vezina (3.2)

The 1915–1916 Montreal Canadiens season was the team's seventh season and seventh of the National Hockey Association (NHA). After finishing last in 1914–15, the club rebounded to win the league championship and win the Stanley Cup for the first time.

== Regular season ==
The Canadiens revised their lineup after finishing last. Ernie Dubeau, Jimmy Gardner and Harry Scott retired. The Canadiens added Howard McNamara and Goldie Prodgers on defence. Jack Laviolette moved to forward from defence. Lalonde would have an outstanding season, leading the league in scoring with 31 goals and Georges Vezina would improve his GAA to 3.2, second in the league to Clint Benedict. The team would win all of its last seven games (and eleven of the last twelve) of the season to take the league championship.

=== Final standings ===
National Hockey Association
	GP	W	L	T	GF	GA
Montreal Canadiens	24	16	7	1	104	76
Ottawa Senators	24	13	11	0	78	72
Quebec Bulldogs	24	10	12	2	91	98
Montreal Wanderers	24	10	14	0	90	116
Toronto Hockey Club	24	9	14	1	97	98

Note: W = Wins, L = Losses, T = Ties, GF= Goals For, GA = Goals Against

== Schedule and results ==
Month	Day	Visitor	Score	Home	Score
Dec.	18	Canadiens	2	Toronto	1
Dec.	22	Wanderers	3	Canadiens	2
Dec.	29	Canadiens	2	Quebec	5
Jan.	1	Canadiens	4	Ottawa	2
Jan.	5	Toronto	1	Canadiens	6
Jan.	8	Canadiens	3	Wanderers	5
Jan.	12	Quebec	3	Canadiens	5
Jan.	15	Ottawa	5	Canadiens	2
Jan.	20	Canadiens	2	Quebec	2 (20' OT)
Jan.	23	Canadiens	1	Toronto	3
Jan.	26	Wanderers	4	Canadiens	5
Feb.	2	Wanderers	9	Canadiens	5
Feb.	6	Toronto	5	Canadiens	10
Feb.	9	Ottawa	2	Canadiens	3 (7'20" OT)
Feb.	12	Canadiens	3	Ottawa	1
Feb.	16	Quebec	3	Canadiens	4
Feb.	19	Wanderers	3	Canadiens	1
Feb.	23	Canadiens	3	Quebec	2
Feb.	26	Quebec	3	Canadiens	4 (15" OT)
Mar.	1	Toronto	3	Canadiens	7
Mar.	4	Canadiens	15	Wanderers	5
Mar.	11	Ottawa	1	Canadiens	4
Mar.	12	Canadiens	5	Ottawa	1
Mar.	16	Canadiens	6	Toronto	4

== Playoffs ==
The club won the league outright to proceed to the Stanley Cup championship.

=== Stanley Cup Final ===
The series was held in Montreal, it being the turn of the NHA champion to host the series. The games were held at the Montreal Arena.

Champions	Runners up	Format	Result
Montreal Canadiens	Portland Rosebuds	best of 5	3–2

== See also ==
- 1915–16 NHA season
- List of Stanley Cup champions

Preceded by Vancouver Millionaires; 1915	Montreal Canadiens; Stanley Cup Champions; 1916	Succeeded by Seattle Metropolitans; 1917
