= 1913–14 Montreal Canadiens season =

NHA hockey team season

1913–14 Montreal Canadiens
- League: 1st(tie) NHA
- 1913–14 record: 13–7–0
- Home record: 9–1–0
- Road record: 4–6–0
- Goals for: 85
- Goals against: 65

Team information
- General manager: George Kennedy
- Coach: Jimmy Gardner
- Captain: Newsy Lalonde
- Arena: Montreal Arena

Team leaders
- Goals: Newsy Lalonde (22)
- Goals against average: Georges Vezina (3.3)

The 1913–14 Montreal Canadiens season was the team's fifth season and fifth of the National Hockey Association (NHA). The club would post a 13–7 record and tie for first place. The Canadiens met Toronto in a league championship series, losing in a two-game, total-goals series 2–6.

== Regular season ==
=== Highlights ===
On January 10, 1914, in a game against the Montreal Wanderers, Newsy Lalonde scored six goals in one game. As of 2014, this is still the Canadiens' record for most goals in one game. Lalonde would repeat the feat in 1920. Lalonde would score five goals in one game one month later on February 11, again against the Wanderers.

=== Final standings ===
National Hockey Association
	GP	W	L	T	P	GF	GA
Toronto Hockey Club	20	13	7	0	26	93	65
Montreal Canadiens	20	13	7	0	26	85	65
Quebec Bulldogs	20	12	8	0	24	111	73
Ottawa Senators	20	11	9	0	22	65	71
Montreal Wanderers	20	7	13	0	14	102	125
Toronto Ontarios	20	4	16	0	8	61	118

Note: W = Wins, L = Losses, T = Ties, P = Points, GF= Goals For, GA = Goals Against

== Schedule and results ==
Month	Day	Visitor	Score	Home	Score
Dec.	27	Canadiens	0	Toronto	3
Dec.	30	Canadiens	4	Quebec	3
Jan.	3	Ontarios	3	Canadiens	4
Jan.	7	Canadiens	0	Ottawa	6
Jan.	10	Wanderers	2	Canadiens	8
Jan.	14	Quebec	3	Canadiens	4
Jan.	17	Canadiens	9	Ontarios	3
Jan.	21	Ottawa	3	Canadiens	2
Jan.	24	Canadiens	9	Wanderers	1
Jan.	28	Toronto	3	Canadiens	4
Jan.	31	Canadiens	4	Ontarios	6
Feb.	4	Canadiens	1	Quebec	6
Feb.	7	Toronto	3	Canadiens	9
Feb.	11	Canadiens	6	Wanderers	2
Feb.	14	Ottawa	0	Canadiens	1 (6'40" overtime)
Feb.	18	Quebec	1	Canadiens	2
Feb.	21	Canadiens	2	Toronto	3
Feb.	25	Canadiens	5	Ottawa	6 (30' overtime)
Feb.	28	Wanderers	5	Canadiens	6 (2'20" overtime)
Mar.	4	Ontarios	3	Canadiens	5

== Playoffs ==
The team tied for first and played Toronto for the league championship and Stanley Cup.

=== Toronto vs. Montreal ===
Date	Winning team	Score	Losing team	Location
March 7, 1914	Montreal Canadiens	2–0	Toronto HC	Montreal Arena
March 11, 1914	Toronto HC	6–0	Montreal Canadiens	Arena Gardens
Toronto wins total goals series 6 goals to 2 to win the O'Brien Cup and the Stanley Cup.

== See also ==
- 1913–14 NHA season
