= Gordon Shore =

Canadian ice hockey player

- Born: August 16, 1887 Ottawa, Ontario, Canada
- Died: April 4, 1964 (aged 76) White Rock, British Columbia, Canada
- Position: Defence
- Played for: Portland Rosebuds
- Playing career: 1914–1920

Norman Eagleson Shore (August 16, 1887 – April 4, 1964) was a Canadian professional ice hockey player. He played three games for the Portland Rosebuds of the Pacific Coast Hockey Association in the 1914–15 season.
