= Portland Ice Arena (Oregon) =

Arena in Portland, Oregon

Coordinates: 45.5308°N 122.6929°W

- Portland Ice Hippodrome
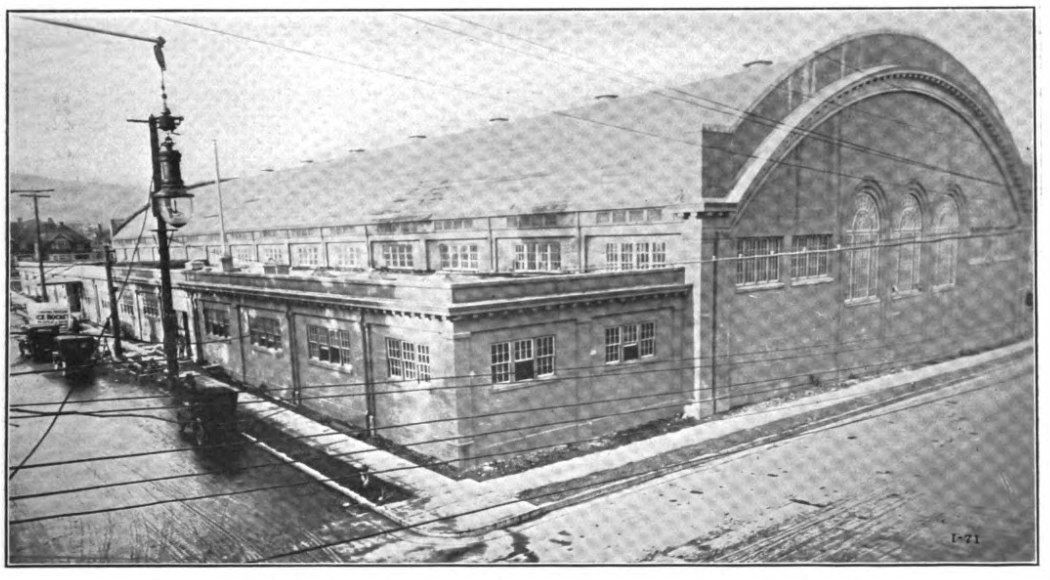
- Exterior of the Portland Ice Arena.
- Interactive map of Portland Ice Arena
- Location: Northwest 21st and Marshall Streets Portland, Oregon
- Capacity: 2,000
- Surface: mechanically frozen ice
- Field size: 360 by 85 feet

Construction
- Opened: 1914
- Closed: 1953
- Demolished: 1963

Tenants
- Portland Rosebuds 1914–1918, 1925–26; Portland Penguins 1928–1941

The Portland Ice Arena, also called the Portland Ice Hippodrome or the Portland Hippodrome, was a 2,000-seat multi-purpose arena located in northwest Portland, Oregon, United States. It was home to the Portland Rosebuds Pacific Coast Hockey Association franchise from 1914 and 1918 and the Portland Penguins from 1928 to 1941.

It was built in 1914 and closed in the 1950s due to concerns about fire safety.

== History ==
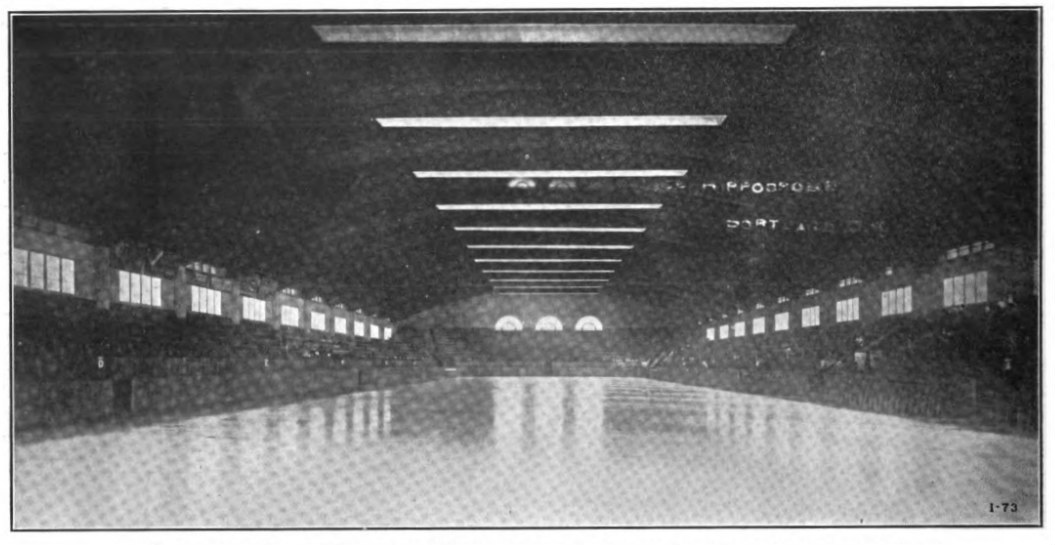
Interior of the Portland Ice Arena.

The announcement that Portland would be the site of an ice hippodrome came in October 1913, which declared the rink would be open by December on Northwest Marshall street and between 20^{th} and 21^{st} avenues. In reality the building opened almost a year later. The plan was to run the rink year-round with the exception of summer months where it could be rented out to automobile dealers.

A Morning Oregonian article on November 2, 1913 continued to say the hippodrome would be open in December but on January 18, 1914, an article was published saying the construction was delayed until February or March.

An article published in the September 27, 1914, edition of the Morning Oregonian announced that the hippodrome would open by December of that year and it would be the largest building of its kind in the world. Its seating could accommodate up to 5,000 patrons. The ice rink was 360 by 85 feet (110 by 26 m) (27,285 square feet (2,534.9 m^{2})). Two thousand people attended the grand opening of the rink on November 9, 1914.

The building's architect was Arthur J. Maclure and the contractor was Victor J. Carlson.

In 1953 the building was given to the University of Portland, which planned to renovate it into a basketball venue. After a few years of plans for renovations, the University removed the seats from the arena, but the Portland Fire Marshal announced in 1956 he would not allow the building to open unless the old wiring were replaced.

In 1958 the arena was sold to Robert Coates and Associates for $152,000, who immediately announced bids to demolish the structure and replace it with a $750,000 shopping center, which was never built. Demolition finally began in September 1963 with public housing replacing the arena's site.
