= 1912–13 Montreal Canadiens season =

NHA hockey team season

1912–13 Montreal Canadiens
- League: 3rd NHA
- 1912–13 record: 9–11–0
- Home record: 4–6–0
- Road record: 5–5–0
- Goals for: 83
- Goals against: 81

Team information
- General manager: George Kennedy
- Coach: Napoleon Dorval
- Captain: Newsy Lalonde
- Arena: Montreal Arena

Team leaders
- Goals: Newsy Lalonde (25)
- Goals against average: Georges Vezina (4.1)

The 1912–13 Montreal Canadiens season was the team's fourth season and fourth of the National Hockey Association (NHA). The club would post a 9–11 record and tie for third place.

== Regular season ==
Newsy Lalonde returned to Montreal after being acquired from Vancouver of the Pacific Coast League (PCHA). Don Smith was acquired from Victoria of the PCHA. Didier Pitre signed with Quebec but the league intervened and he returned to the Canadiens.

An exhibition game was played with the Wanderers in Toronto at the new Arena Gardens on December 22. Newsy Lalonde would trip Odie Cleghorn and his brother Sprague Cleghorn then skated over and hit Lalonde on the face, opening a 12 stitch cut. Cleghorn would be charged in Toronto court and fined $50 and suspended by the league.

The Canadiens would open the season with a three-game winning streak. At the halfway point, the club's record was 7–3 to lead the league, but Quebec came on strong with an eleven-game win streak to win the league championship and Montreal finished third behind Quebec and the Wanderers.

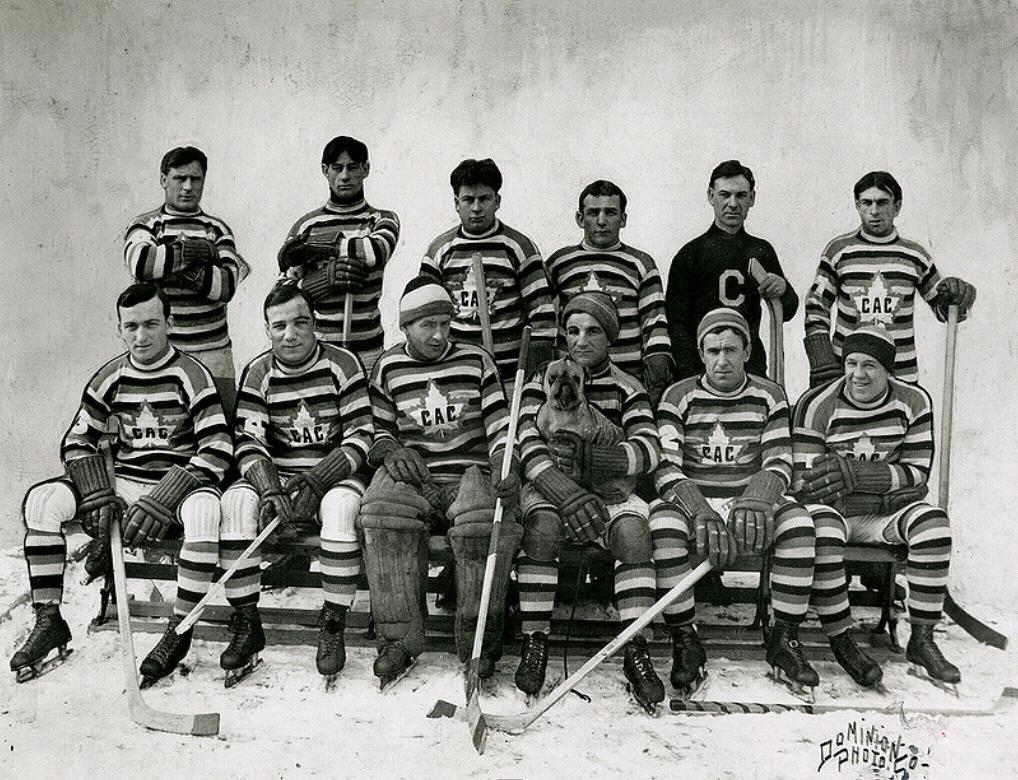
The Montreal Canadiens pose for a team photo, 1912–13

=== Final standings ===
National Hockey Association
	GP	W	L	T	GF	GA
Quebec Bulldogs	20	16	4	0	112	75
Montreal Wanderers	20	10	10	0	93	90
Toronto Hockey Club	20	9	11	0	86	95
Montreal Canadiens	20	9	11	0	83	81
Ottawa Senators	20	9	11	0	87	81
Toronto Tecumsehs	20	7	13	0	59	98

Note: W = Wins, L = Losses, T = Ties, GF= Goals For, GA = Goals Against

== Schedule and results ==
Game	Day	Visitor	Score	Home	Score	Record
December
1	25	Canadiens	9	Toronto	5	1–0
2	28	Toronto	5	Canadiens	8	2–0
January
3	1	Canadiens	4	Tecumsehs	3	3–0
4	4	Ottawa	7	Canadiens	3	3–1
5	8	Canadiens	4	Wanderers	3	4–1
6	11	Canadiens	3	Quebec	4	4–2
7	15	Quebec	4	Canadiens	5	5–2
8	18	Canadiens	6	Ottawa	0	6–2
9	22	Wanderers	4	Canadiens	3	6–3
10	25	Tecumsehs	4	Canadiens	5 (17' ot)	7–3
February
11	1‡	Canadiens	1	Ottawa	2	7–4
12	5‡	Tecumsehs	5	Canadiens	4	7–5
13	8‡	Canadiens	3	Toronto	5	7–6
14	12	Wanderers	4	Canadiens	6	8–6
15	15	Ottawa	3	Canadiens	2	8–7
16	19	Canadiens	2	Quebec	4	8–8
17	22	Quebec	7	Canadiens	6	8–9
18	26	Canadiens	4	Wanderers	5	8–10
March
19	1	Canadiens	3	Tecumsehs	1	8–11
20	5	Toronto	6	Canadiens	2	9–11

‡ Played with rover (7 man hockey)

== Playoffs ==
The team did not qualify for the playoffs.

== Awards and records ==
=== Milestones ===
- January 18, 1913 – Georges Vezina posted the club's first shutout.

== See also ==
- 1912–13 NHA season
