= Eugene Payan =

Canadian ice hockey player (1888 - 1971)

- Born: September 10, 1888; Saint-Hyacinthe, Quebec, Canada
- Died: April 27, 1971 (aged 82); Saint-Hyacinthe, Quebec, Canada
- Height: 5 ft 7 in (170 cm)
- Weight: 160 lb (73 kg; 11 st 6 lb)
- Position: Centre
- Played for: Montreal Canadiens
- Playing career: 1907–1914

Eugène Duclos Payan (September 10, 1888 – April 27, 1971) was a Canadian professional ice hockey player. He played with the Montreal Canadiens of the National Hockey Association, from the 1910–11 season through to the 1913–14 season.

On March 2, 1912, he suffered a concussion when he collided with one of the Cleghorn brothers in a 2–1 victory of the Canadiens against the Montreal Wanderers. Alphonse Jetté had to replace him as Eugène became delirious and was taken to a hospital.
