= Arthur Bernier =

Canadian ice hockey player

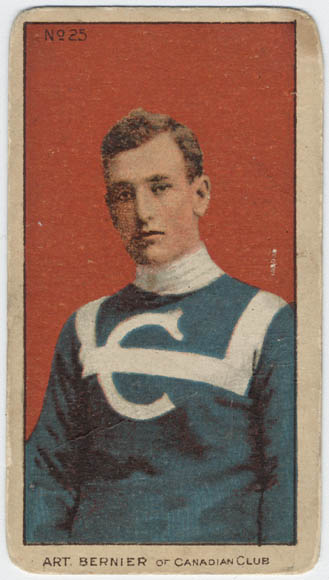
- A cigarette pack hockey card showing Bernier in the original Canadiens uniform of 1909–10.
- Born: July 16, 1886 Quebec City, Quebec, Canada
- Died: May 21, 1953 (aged 66)
- Height: 5 ft 9 in (175 cm)
- Weight: 156 lb (71 kg; 11 st 2 lb)
- Position: Centre
- Shot: Left
- Played for: Montreal Canadiens; Montreal Wanderers
- Playing career: 1903–1912

Joseph Georges Arthur Bernier (July 16, 1886 – May 21, 1953) was a professional ice hockey player for the Montreal Canadiens, Montreal Wanderers and Galt Professionals. He played for the Canadiens in their inaugural season of 1909–10. He was born in Quebec City, Quebec.

== Playing career ==
Bernier played intermediate hockey for Belleville in the Ontario Hockey Association in the 1903–04 season. He joined the Canadian army in 1904 and played hockey for the Kingston 14th Regiment in Senior OHA play for three seasons from 1906 to 1909. He joined the Montreal Canadiens in the team's inaugural 1910 season and played the full 12-game season. Bernier was among the scorers in the Canadiens' first-ever game, a 7–6 win against Cobalt, in which his mother was hurt in the stands by a stick due to the lack of protective coverage for the viewers in attendance.

He played 3 games for the Galt Professionals after the NHA season was finished. He returned to the Canadiens for the 1910–11 season and only played in 3 games. The next season, he joined the Wanderers and played in 10 games, scoring 4 goals.

== Personal life ==
He was born on July 16, 1886, in Quebec City, the son of Lucien Bernier and Margaret West. He joined the Canadian Army in 1904. He married Teresa Braniff on November 16, 1908, in Kingston, Ontario. He died on May 21, 1953. He lived in Outremont, Quebec. He is buried in Notre-Dame-des-Neiges Cemetery in Montreal, Quebec.
