= Hector Dallaire =

Canadian ice hockey player

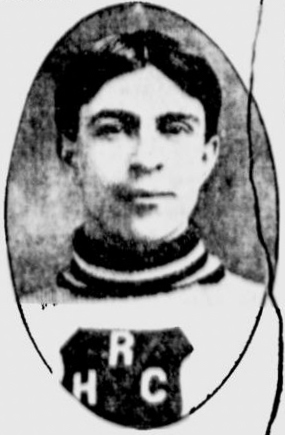
- Dallaire with Rockland Hockey Club.
- Born: May 15, 1888 Rockland, Ontario, Canada
- Died: February 18, 1925 (aged 36) Rockland, ON, CAN
- Height: 5 ft 7 in (170 cm)
- Weight: 160 lb (73 kg; 11 st 6 lb)
- Position: Centre
- Shot: Right
- Played for: Montreal Canadiens; Halifax Crescents
- Playing career: 1910–1914

Hector "Henri" Joseph Dallaire (May 15, 1888 – February 18, 1925) was a Canadian professional ice hockey player who played for the Montreal Canadiens of the National Hockey Association. He was one of the first francophone professional ice hockey players.

== Career ==
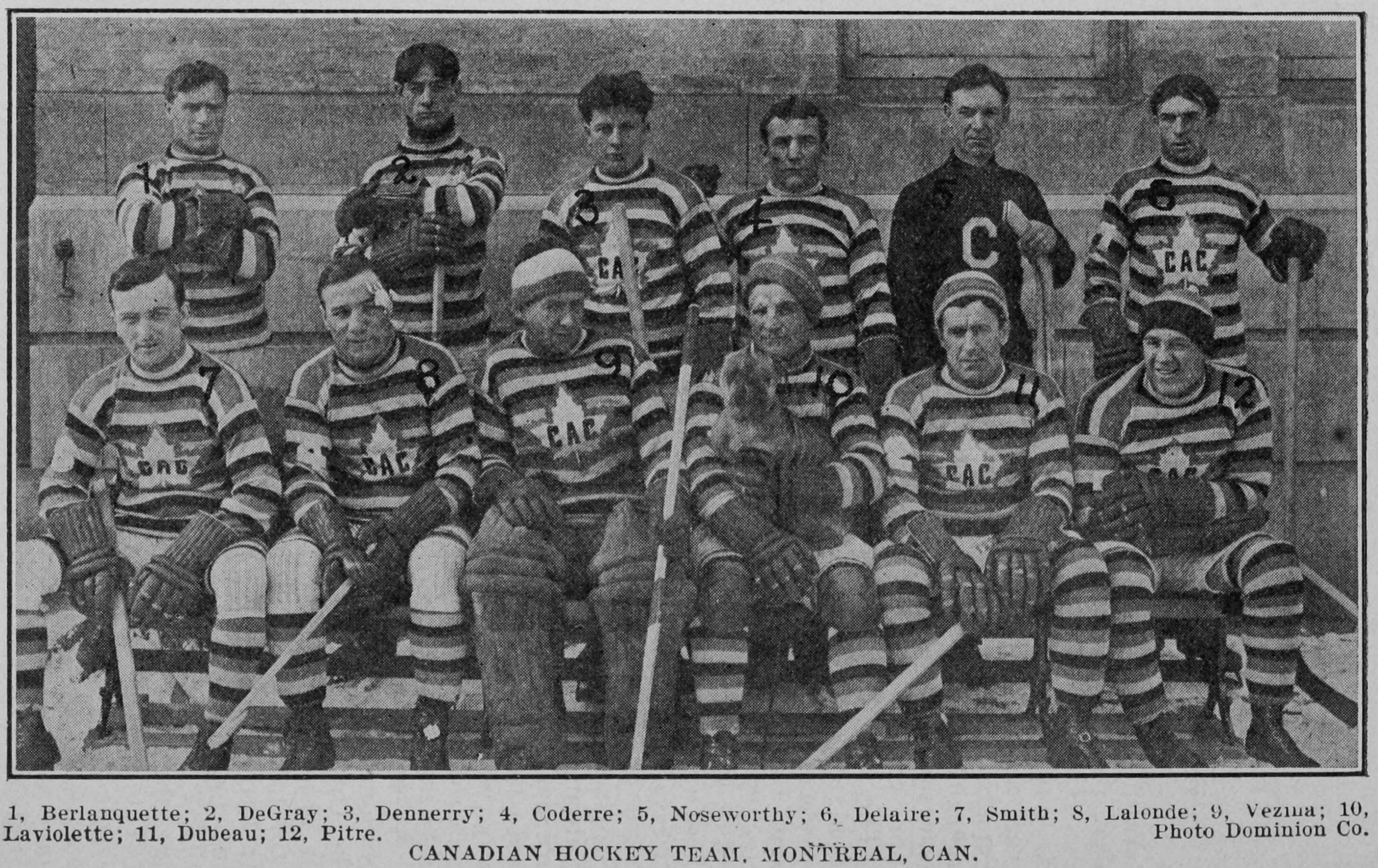
Dallaire, standing at the far right, with the 1912–13 Montreal Canadiens.

Born in Rockland, Ontario, Dallaire played for the Rockland Hockey Club of the Lower Ottawa Valley Hockey Association from 1907 until 1910. In 1910, he signed with the one-year-old Montreal Canadiens. He played two seasons as a full-time player, then two as a part-time player before being released by the Canadiens after the 1913–14 season. In the 1912–13 and 1913–14 seasons, he failed to crack the lineup of the Canadiens and he played for the Halifax Crescents of the Maritime Professional Hockey League.

In 1914, he returned to Rockland, where he played two further seasons with the Rockland club, ending in 1916. His best career season with the Canadiens was 1910–11, his first, when he scored 11 goals in 13 games. He scored 23 goals in 16 games with the Crescents in 1912–13.
