= Jack Fournier (ice hockey) =

Canadian ice hockey player

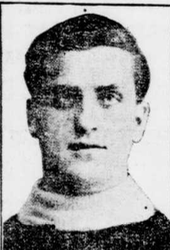
- Born: August 4, 1892 Ottawa, Ontario, Canada
- Died: November 30, 1966 (aged 74)
- Height: 5 ft 11 in (180 cm)
- Weight: 175 lb (79 kg; 12 st 7 lb)
- Position: Right wing
- Shot: Right
- Played for: Montreal Canadiens; Ottawa Senators
- Playing career: 1915–1917

Albert Jean "Jack" Fournier (August 4, 1892 – November 30, 1966) was a Canadian professional ice hockey winger who played in the National Hockey Association.

== Early life ==
Fournier was born in Ottawa, Ontario, Canada.

== Career ==
During his career, Fournier played for the Montreal Canadiens and the Ottawa Senators. He won a Stanley Cup with the Canadiens in 1916.
