= Portland Rosebuds (ice hockey) =

Professional ice hockey team

- City: Portland, Oregon
- League: PCHA
- Founded: 1914
- Folded: 1918
- Home arena: Portland Ice Arena
- Colors: Navy and White

Franchise history
- 1912–1914: New Westminster Royals
- 1914–1918: Portland Rosebuds

Championships
- Regular season titles: 1916
- Stanley Cups: 0

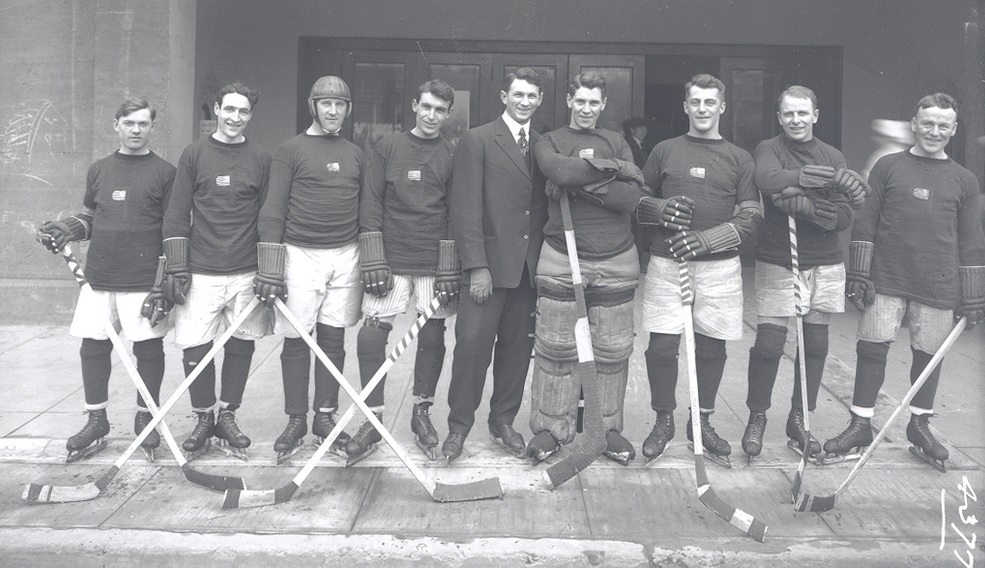
1914–15 Portland Rosebuds. From left to right: Connie Benson, Charles Tobin, Moose Johnson, Smokey Harris, Pete Muldoon, Mike Mitchell, Eddie Oatman, Ran McDonald, Arthur Throop.

Portland Rosebuds was the name of two professional men's ice hockey teams in Portland, Oregon. Both teams played their home games at the Portland Ice Arena. The first Rosebuds are notable for being the first American-based team to be allowed to compete for the Stanley Cup. The second Rosebuds are notable in that their roster was used to build the NHL expansion Chicago Blackhawks.

The first Portland Rosebuds (Note: The team was officially called the Portland Hockey Club and while they were commonly called "Rosebuds", they were also sometimes referred to as "Uncle Sams"."The Stanley Coup: How Portland put its name on hockey's top prize". Oregon Public Broadcasting.) played in the Pacific Coast Hockey Association from 1914 to 1918. The team was previously known as the New Westminster Royals, an inaugural member of the PCHA in 1911. The team moved to Portland due to poor attendance in New Westminster, British Columbia, and the availability of a larger arena in Portland. In 1916 the Portland Rosebuds won the PCHA championship and briefly held the Stanley Cup, losing it to the Montreal Canadiens in the 1916 Stanley Cup Final. Their win is memorialized on the Stanley Cup as "Portland Ore./PCHA Champions/1915–16" on the 1909 base ring, one of the permanent rings. Portland was the first United States–based team to participate in the Stanley Cup Final. Portland suspended operations in 1918, and were replaced by the Victoria Aristocrats.

== Season-by-season record ==
Note: GP = Games played, W = Wins, L = Losses, T = Ties, GF = Goals for, GA = Goals against

Season	GP	W	L	T	GF	GA	Finish	Playoffs
1914–15	18	9	9	0	91	83	2nd place	N/A
1915–16	18	13	5	0	71	50	1st place	League Champions; Lost Stanley Cup Final to Montreal Canadiens 3–2
1916–17	24	9	15	0	114	112	3rd place	N/A
1917–18	18	7	11	0	63	75	last place	Missed playoffs

== WHL Portland Rosebuds ==
Portland Rosebuds
- City: Portland, Oregon
- League: WHL
- Founded: 1925
- Folded: 1926
- Home arena: Portland Ice Arena
- Colors: Black and Yellow

Franchise history
- 1921–1925: Regina Capitals
- 1925–1926: Portland Rosebuds

Championships
- Regular season titles: 0
- Stanley Cups: 0

The second Rosebuds team was born when the Regina Capitals moved to Portland for the 1925–26 WHL season. This was the final season for the Western Hockey League (WHL).

When the league folded, the Saskatoon players were sold to form the Montreal Maroons. Frank Patrick then negotiated the sale of the rest of the WHL players to the National Hockey League. The players were to be sold as three teams, one from the Victoria Cougars (who would be sold to Detroit and eventually become the Red Wings), one from the Rosebuds, and a third from the best players from Calgary, Edmonton and Vancouver. A deal was reached where the players of the Rosebuds were sold for $100,000 to form the new Chicago Black Hawks expansion franchise.

=== Season-by-season record ===
Note: GP = Games played, W = Wins, L = Losses, T = Ties, GF = Goals for, GA = Goals against

Season	GP	W	L	T	GF	GA	Finish	Playoffs
1925–26	30	12	16	2	84	106	4th place	Missed playoffs

== Head coaches ==
- Pete Muldoon (1914–15)
- Edward Savage (1915–1918)
- Pete Muldoon (1925–26)

== Notable players ==
- Moose Johnson – 1952 Hockey Hall of Fame inductee
- Dick Irvin – 1958 Hockey Hall of Fame inductee
- Tommy Dunderdale – 1974 Hockey Hall of Fame inductee
- Gordon Shore – played in the 1914–15 season

== See also ==
- Portland Rosebuds players
