= 1906–07 Ottawa Hockey Club season =

Ice hockey team season of play

1906–07 Ottawa Hockey Club
- League: 2nd ECAHA
- 1906–07 record: 7–3–0

Team information
- Coach: Alf Smith
- Captain: Harvey Pulford
- Arena: Dey's Arena

Team leaders
- Goals: Harry Smith (21)
- Goals against average: Percy LeSueur (5.4)

The 1906–07 Ottawa Hockey Club season lasted from January 3 until March 10. Ottawa placed second to the Montreal Wanderers who went through the season undefeated.

== Off-season ==
Frank McGee of Ottawa retired to pursue his government career. Tommy Smith moved to Pittsburgh to play as a professional. Percy LeSueur returned after playing the final 1906 playoff game and became the starting goaltender. Billy Hague would play with the Ottawa Victorias.

== Regular season ==
=== Highlights ===
A major battle took place for the game between the Senators and Wanderers on January 12. Stick work was the order of the day as Charles Spittal of Ottawa knocked Cecil Blachford in the head, Alf Smith hit Hod Stuart in the head and Harry Smith broke Ernie Johnson's nose. The Wanderers would still win, 4–2. Blachford, Johnson and Stuart all required hospitalization.

After the game, a special league meeting was called to hand out discipline, with Victorias and Wanderers wanting Spittal and Alf Smith suspended for the season. The players were not suspended, leading the league president Mr. McRobie to resign, leaving D'arcy McGee to take over as president. Ottawa had threatened to leave the league, and, under an agreement between the two teams, the Wanderers would have left the league also.

On the next visit of the Ottawa team to Montreal, to play the Victorias, the three Ottawa players were arrested by Montreal police. Eventually Alf Smith and Spittal were fined $20 for their actions and Harry Smith was found not guilty.

=== Final standings ===
Team	Games Played	Wins	Losses	Ties	Goals For	Goals Against
Montreal Wanderers	10	10	0	0	105	39
Ottawa Hockey Club	10	7	3	0	76	54
Montreal Victorias	10	6	4	0	101	70
Montreal Hockey Club	10	3	7	0	58	83
Quebec Hockey Club	10	2	8	0	62	88
Montreal Shamrocks	10	2	8	0	52	120

== Exhibitions ==
Prior to the season, Ottawa travelled to Winnipeg for a series of exhibition games against Manitoba league teams including the Kenora Thistles, who then came east to play a challenge in Montreal. On December 31, the Ottawas defeated Kenora 10–5. On January 1, the Ottawas were defeated by the Winnipeg Strathconas 9–6.

After the Kenora Thistles defeated the Wanderers for the Stanley Cup, they played an exhibition game against Ottawa in Ottawa on January 23. Kenora, without defenseman Art Ross, lost to Ottawa 8–3. Harry Smith scored four goals and Harry Westwick scored three for Ottawa. In the game Billy McGimsie suffered a career-ending shoulder injury. At the time, it was not described as serious, only a "badly bruised and slightly dislocated shoulder". He played in the Thistles' next exhibition in Toronto on January 25. The Ottawa Victorias' Charlie Ross joined Ottawa for the game.

After the season, Harry Westwick and Alf Smith joined the Thistles for the last few games of the MHL season, and the Thistles' unsuccessful Stanley Cup challenge against the Wanderers.

January 23, 1907
Kenora Thistles	3	at	Ottawa Hockey Club	8
Eddie Giroux		G	Percy LeSueur
Russell Phillips		P	Charlie Ross
Si Griffis		CP	Harvey Pulford
Tom Hooper	1	RO	Harry Westwick	3
Billy McGimsie		C	Harry Smith	4
Roxy Beaudro		RW	Alf Smith	1
Tommy Phillips, Capt.	2	LW	Hamby Shore
Referee: Weldy Young
Umpires: R. Pringle & J. Kelvin
Source: Ottawa Journal

== Schedule and results ==
Month	Day	Visitor	Score	Home	Score
Jan.	5	Quebec	1	Ottawa	6
Jan.	12	Ottawa	2	Wanderers	4
Jan.	19	Shamrocks	2	Ottawa	6
Jan.	26	Ottawa	12	Victorias	10
Feb.	2	Montreal	2	Ottawa	5
Feb.	9	Ottawa	5	Quebec	4 (2' overtime)
Feb.	16	Victorias	7	Ottawa	16
Feb.	23	Ottawa	12	Shamrocks	6
Mar.	2	Wanderers	10	Ottawa	6
Mar.	9	Ottawa	6	Montreal	8

== Player statistics ==
=== Goaltending averages ===
Name	GP	GA	SO	Avg.
Percy LeSueur	10	54		5.4

=== Leading scorers ===
Name	Club	GP	G
Smith, Harry	Ottawa	9	21
Smith, Alf	Ottawa	9	17
Shore, Hamby	Ottawa	10	17

== See also ==
- 1907 ECAHA season
