= 1907 ECAHA season =

Ice hockey league season of play

- League: Eastern Canada Amateur Hockey Association
- Sport: Ice hockey
- Duration: January 3 – March 10, 1907
- Teams: 6

1907
- Champions: Montreal Wanderers
- Top scorer: Ernie Russell (42 goals)

ECAHA seasons
- ← 1906 1908 →

The 1907 ECAHA season was the second season of the Eastern Canada Amateur Hockey Association (ECAHA). Teams played a ten-game schedule. The Montreal Wanderers lost the Stanley Cup to the Kenora Thistles of the Manitoba Hockey Association mid-season, but went undefeated in the regular season to win the league championship. They proceeded to defeat Kenora in a two-game total goals series to win back the Cup.

== League business ==
=== Executive ===
- Fred McRobie (President)
- Thomas D'Arcy McGee, Ottawa (1st Vice-President)
- Gordon Blair, Quebec (2nd Vice-President)
- Emmett Quinn, Shamrocks (Secretary-Treasurer)

Nationals and Grand Trunk applied for franchises but did not get three-fourths approval.

=== Rule changes ===
- Teams could have professionals as well as amateurs
- After a puck strikes a goalie, the rebound could now be played by the defending team without it being called offside
- A player injured in the first half can sit for ten minutes and the other team has to take off a player.

== Regular season ==
Frank McGee of Ottawa retired to pursue his government career. The Wanderers added two professionals, Riley Hern from the Portage Lake-Houghton pros and Hod Stuart from the Pittsburgh pros.

Prior to the season, Ottawa travelled to Winnipeg for a series of exhibition games against Manitoba league teams including the Kenora Thistles, who then came east to play a challenge in Montreal. The Montreal Victorias hosted the St. Nicholas Hockey Club from New York in an exhibition on December 22, 1906, defeating them 16–3.

=== Highlights ===
A major battle took place for the game between the Senators and Wanderers on January 12. Stick work was the order of the day as Charles Spittal of Ottawa knocked Cecil Blachford in the head, Alf Smith hit Hod Stuart in the head and Harry Smith broke Ernie Johnson's nose. The Wanderers would still win, 4–2.

After the game, a special league meeting was called to hand out discipline, with Victorias and Wanderers wanting Spittal and Alf Smith suspended for the season. The players were not suspended, leading the league president Mr. McRobie to resign, leaving Darcy McGee to take over as president.

On the next visit of the Ottawa team to Montreal, to play the Victorias, the three Ottawa players were arrested by Montreal police. Eventually Alf Smith and Spittal were fined $20 for their actions and Harry Smith was found not guilty.

The scoring championship was close, with Ernie Russell of the Wanderers placing first with 42 goals in 9 games, and Russell Bowie scoring 38 in 10 games.

=== Final standing ===
Note GP = Games Played, W = Wins, L = Losses, T = Ties, GF = Goals For, GA = Goals Against

Team	GP	W	L	T	GF	GA
Montreal Wanderers	10	10	0	0	105	39
Ottawa Hockey Club	10	7	3	0	76	54
Montreal Victorias	10	6	4	0	101	70
Montreal Hockey Club	10	3	7	0	58	83
Quebec Hockey Club	10	2	8	0	62	88
Montreal Shamrocks	10	2	8	0	52	120

=== Results ===
Month	Day	Visitor	Score	Home	Score
Jan.	2	Wanderers	6	Victorias	5 (OT 10')
Jan.	5	Montreal HC	5	Shamrocks	3
Jan.	5	Quebec HC	1	Ottawa HC	6
Jan.	9	Wanderers	6	Montreal HC	3
Jan.	12	Ottawa HC	2	Wanderers	4
Jan.	12	Victorias	10	Quebec HC	1
Jan.	16	Victorias	16	Shamrocks	3
Jan.	19	Shamrocks	2	Ottawa HC	6
Jan.	19	Quebec HC	8	Montreal HC	15
Jan.	23	Victorias	12	Montreal HC	6
Jan.	26	Ottawa HC	12	Victorias	10
Jan.	26	Wanderers	11	Quebec HC	3
Jan.	30	Shamrocks	5	Montreal HC	3
Feb.	2	Montreal HC	2	Ottawa HC	5
Feb.	2	Quebec HC	8	Shamrocks	11
Feb.	6	Wanderers	5	Victorias	2
Feb.	9	Ottawa HC	5	Quebec HC	4 (OT 2')
Feb.	9	Montreal HC	3	Wanderers	16
Feb.	13	Shamrocks	7	Victorias	19
Feb.	16	Victorias	7	Ottawa HC	16
Feb.	16	Quebec HC	5	Wanderers	13
Feb.	19	Shamrocks	5	Wanderers	18
Feb.	23	Ottawa HC	12	Shamrocks	6
Feb.	23	Montreal HC	5	Quebec HC	9
Feb.	27	Montreal HC	8	Victorias	13
Mar.	2†	Wanderers	10	Ottawa HC	6
Mar.	2	Quebec HC	6	Victorias	7
Mar.	6	Shamrocks	5	Wanderers	16
Mar.	9	Ottawa HC	6	Montreal HC	8
Mar.	9	Shamrocks	5	Quebec HC	17

† Wanderers clinch league championship.

== Player statistics ==
=== Scoring leaders ===
Note: GP = Games played, G = Goals scored

Name	Club	GP	G
Ernie Russell	Wanderers	9	42
Russell Bowie	Victorias	10	38
Blair Russell	Victorias	10	25
Harry Smith	Ottawa HC	9	21
Grover Sargent	Montreal HC	10	20
Chandler Hale	Victorias	7	18
Alf Smith	Ottawa HC	9	17
Hamby Shore	Ottawa HC	10	17
Ernie Johnson	Montreal HC	10	15
Charles Constantine	Quebec HC	7	15

=== Goaltending averages ===
Note: GP = Games played, GA = Goals against, SO = Shutouts, GAA = Goals against average

Name	Club	GP	GA	SO	GAA
Riley Hern	Wanderers	10	39		3.9
Percy LeSueur	Ottawa HC	10	54		5.4
Nathan Frye	Victorias	10	70		7.0
Charles Doddridge	Quebec HC	4	30		7.5
George White	Montreal HC	10	83		8.3
Paddy Moran	Quebec HC	6	58		9.7
Neil Currie	Shamrocks	10	120		12.0

== Stanley Cup challenges ==
The 1907 season had two Stanley Cup champions, Montreal Wanderers and Kenora Thistles.

=== Wanderers vs. New Glasgow at Montreal ===
The Wanderers played one Stanley Cup challenge before the season, defeating the New Glasgow Cubs in a two-game series 10–3, 7–2, December 27–29, 1906. This was the first series in which professional players played for the Stanley Cup, as the Wanderers and other teams in the ECAHA were starting to mix amateurs with pros in their squads.

Date	Winning Team	Score	Losing Team	Location
December 27, 1906	Montreal Wanderers	10–3	New Glasgow Cubs	Montreal Arena
December 29, 1906	Montreal Wanderers	7–2	New Glasgow Cubs	Montreal Arena
Montreal wins total goals series 17 goals to 5.

December 27, 1906
New Glasgow Cubs	3		Montreal Wanderers	10
Frank Morrison		G	William "Riley" Hern	
James Musick		P	Billy Strachan	
Evan MacMillan		CP	Rod Kennedy	
Jack Marks	2	RO	Lester Patrick	3
Jack McDonald	1	C	Frank "Pud" Glass	4
Jimmy Williams		LW	Ernie "Moose" Johnson	
Bill Lannon		RW	Ernie Russell	3
Percy MacDonald		Spare	Cecil Blachford, Capt	
James Murphy		Spare	Hod Stuart	
Referees Howard, Russell Bowie

December 29, 1906
New Glasgow Cubs	2		Montreal Wanderers	7
Frank Morrison		G	William "Riley" Hern	
Jack McDonald	1	P	Billy Strachan	
Percy McDonald		CP	Rod Kennedy	1
Bill Lannon		RO	Lester Patrick	3
Jimmy Williams		C	Frank "Pud" Glass	1
James Murphy	1	LW	Ernie "Moose" Johnson	2
James Musick		RW	Cecil Blachford, Capt	
Evan MacMillan		Spare	Hod Stuart	
Jack Marks		Spare	Ernie Russell	
Referees Howard, Russell Bowie

=== Wanderers vs. Kenora at Montreal ===
The Wanderers played one Stanley Cup challenge during the season, losing to the Kenora Thistles 2–4, 6–8 on January 17–21. Aided by future Hockey Hall of Famers Joe Hall, Tom Hooper, Tommy Phillips, and Art Ross, the Thistles came away with 4–2 and 8–6 victories for a combined score of 12–8 to win a two-game total goals series. Hall and Ross were borrowed from the Brandon Wheat City team.

For Montreal, these were their first games after their donnybrook with Ottawa on January 12. Centre Cecil Blachford, who had been knocked out in the Ottawa game, did not play. Johnson and Stuart, who had required hospitalization, did play. Ernie Russell substituted for Blachford.

Date	Winning Team	Score	Losing Team	Location
January 17, 1907	Kenora Thistles	4–2	Montreal Wanderers	Montreal Arena
January 21, 1907	Kenora Thistles	8–6	Montreal Wanderers	Montreal Arena
Kenora wins total goals series 12 goals to 8

January 17, 1907
Montreal Wanderers	2		Kenora Thistles	4
William "Riley" Hern		G	Eddie Giroux	
Billy Strachan		P	Art Ross	
Hod Stuart		CP	Si Griffis	
Lester Patrick, Capt.		RO	Tom Hooper	
Ernie Russell	2	C	Billy McGimsie	
Frank "Pud" Glass		RW	Roxy Beaudro	
Ernie "Moose" Johnson		LW	Tommy Phillips, Capt.	4
Jack Marshall		sub		
Rod Kennedy		spare	Joe Hall	
Bill Chipchase		spare	Russell Phillips	
Referees Bob Meldrum, Russell Bowie

Source: Ottawa Citizen

January 21, 1907
Montreal Wanderers	6		Kenora Thistles	8
William "Riley" Hern		G	Eddie Giroux	
Rod Kennedy		P	Art Ross	
Hod Stuart		CP	Si Griffis	
Lester Patrick, Capt	3	RO	Tom Hooper	3
Ernie Russell	2	C	Billy McGimsie	1
Frank "Pud" Glass		RW	Roxy Beaudro	1
Ernie "Moose" Johnson		LW	Tommy Phillips, Capt.	3
Jack Marshall	1	sub		
Billy Strachan		spare	Joe Hall	
Bill Chipchase		spare	Russell Phillips	
Referees Chittick, Shea

Source: Ottawa Citizen

After the series, the Thistles played an exhibition game in Ottawa on January 23. The Thistles lost 8–3 to Ottawa. Harry Smith scored four goals and Harry Westwick scored three for Ottawa. In this game Billy McGimsie suffered a career-ending shoulder injury.

=== Brandon Wheat City vs. Kenora Thistles at Winnipeg ===
After returning home, Kenora had played the balance of the MPHL season. Montreal Wanderers won the ECAHA regular-season champions and challenged to regain the Stanley Cup. Challenge was excepted. However Brandon and Kenora finished tied for first in the Manitoba League. So a best of three game series was upset to see who the Manitoba League Champion and who defended the cup again the Montreal Wanderers. After losing McGimsie, Si Griffis and Tom Hooper also went down to injury. Kenora signed three players to bolster its team: Alf Smith and Rat Westwick of Ottawa, and Fred Whitcroft of Peterborough to finish the season. (All three were future Hall of Fame inductees.) By the time of the MPHL playoff, Stanley Cup trustee William Foran notified Kenora that Smith and Westwick were ineligible for the challenge.

== Playoff ==
Kenora would play and win the MPHL playoff against Brandon to successfully defend the Cup, winning a best-of-three series 2–0. Hall and Ross played for Brandon in the series, while Smith, Westwick and Whitcroft played for the Thistles. At the time of the series, the acting Stanley Cup trustee William Foran had already declared Smith and Westwick ineligible for the challenge series. After the series was over, the Manitoba League registered their disapproval over Mr. Foran's decision to exclude the players.

Date	Winning Team	Score	Losing Team	Location
March 16, 1907	Kenora Thistles	8–6	Brandon Wheat City	Winnipeg Auditorium
March 18, 1907	Kenora Thistles	4–1	Brandon Wheat City	Winnipeg Auditorium
Kenora wins series 2–0

March 16, 1907
Brandon Wheat City	6		Kenora Thistles	8
Bobby Mercer		G	Eddie Geroux	
Art Leader		P	Roxy Beaudro	
Art Ross		CP	Si Griffis	
George Smith		RO	Harry Westwick	
Joe Hall Capt.		C	Fred Whitcroft	
Walter Bellamy		RW	Alf Smith	
Jack Fraser		LW	Tommy Phillips, Capt.	
Art Serviss -RW		spare	Tom Hopper -R0/D	
Roy Amrstrong -D		spare	Russell Phillips -RW/LW	

March 18, 1907
Brandon Wheat City	1		Kenora Thistles	4
Bobby Mercer		G	Eddie Geroux	
Art Leader		P	Roxy Beaudro	
Art Ross		CP	Si Griffis	
George Smith		RO	Harry Westwick	
Joe Hall Capt.		C	Fred Whitecorft	
Walter Bellamy		RW	Alf Smith	
Jack Fraser		LW	Tommy Phillips, Capt.	
Art Serviss -RW		spare	Tom Hopper -R0/D	
Roy Armstrong -D		spare	Russell Phillips -RW/LW	

- Goal scorers in both games are unknown.

=== Montreal Wanderers vs. Kenora Thistles at Winnipeg ===
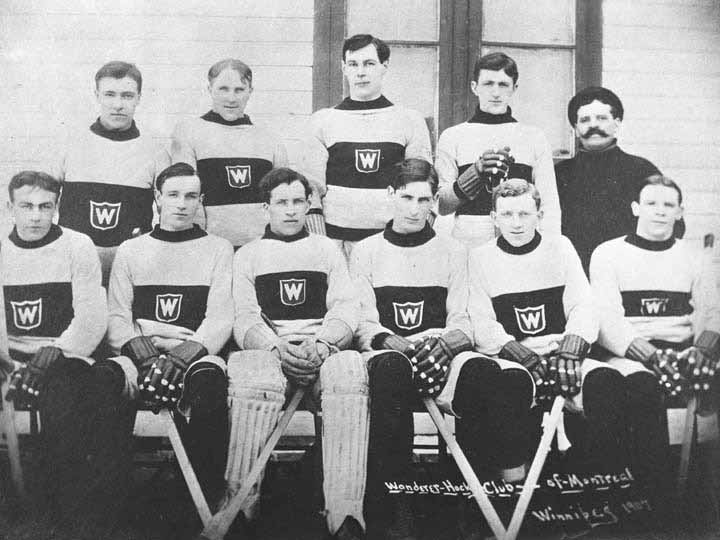
Wanderers players and team officials in Winnipeg for challenge

Kenora dressed Smith and Westwick for the challenge anyway and Montreal filed a protest with Foran. Foran ruled that both players were ineligible. The series was supposed to start on March 20 in Kenora but did not. One report was that the ice in the rink was too poor to play on and the rink was closed. The clubs went ahead and started the series on March 23 in Winnipeg instead, with Smith and Westwick playing. Foran was notified by the press (inaccurately) that Montreal had dropped its protest and that the clubs intended to play anyway. Foran threatened to take the Cup back to Ottawa:

If the two clubs ignore the instructions of the cup trustees by mutually agreeing to play against Westwick and Smith when both were positively informed these men were ineligible to participate in the present cup matches, the series will be treated as void, and the cup will be taken charge of by the trustees. It will remain in their possession till the various hockey leagues can educate themselves up to a standard where decent sport will be the order of the day.”

The teams went ahead and played the series. However, Foran changed his mind after the Wanderers won the Cup, stating that the Wanderers could keep the Cup, because they had not rescinded their protest.

After the series, the Wanderers returned to Montreal with the Stanley Cup. The Cup was stolen from Montreal photographer Jimmy Rice's home and held for ransom. No ransom was paid, and the Cup was returned to Rice. It was used as a geranium planter until the fall.

Date	Winning Team	Score	Losing Team	Location
March 23, 1907	Montreal Wanderers	7–2	Kenora Thistles	Winnipeg Auditorium
March 25, 1907	Kenora Thistles	6–5	Montreal Wanderers	Winnipeg Auditorium
Montreal wins total goals series 12 goals to 8

March 23, 1907
Montreal Wanderers	7		Kenora Thistles	2
William "Riley" Hern		G	Eddie Giroux	
Lester Patrick, Capt.		P	Tom Hooper	
Hod Stuart		CP	Si Griffis	
Frank "Pud" Glass	2	RO	Harry Westwick	
Ernie Russell	4	C	Fred Whitecroft	
Cecil Blachford		RW	Alf Smith	1
Ernie "Moose" Johnson	1	LW	Tommy Phillips, Capt.	1
Bill Chipchase		spare	Roxy Beaudro	
Rod Kennedy		spare	Russell Phillips	
Referee W. MacFarlane			Referee Biily Kean	

March 25, 1907
Montreal Wanderers	5		Kenora Thistles	6
William "Riley" Hern		G	Eddie Giroux	
Lester Patrick, Capt.	1	P	Roxy Beaudro	1
Hod Stuart		CP	Si Griffis	1
Frank "Pud" Glass	1	RO	Harry Westwick	
Ernie Russell	1	C	Fred Whitecroft	2
Cecil Blachford		RW	Alf Smith	1
Ernie "Moose' Johnson	2	LW	Tommy Phillips, Capt.	1
Rod Kennedy		spare	Russell Phillips	
Bill Chipchase		spare	Tom Hooper	
Referee W. MacFarlane			Referee Billy Kean	

== Stanley Cup engravings ==
The 1907 Stanley Cup was presented twice by the trophy's trustee William Foran: first to the Kenora Thistles, and then to the Montreal Wanderers.

While the Wanderers followed the tradition of having the names of all of their players engraved on the outside of the Cup, the Thistles only had their team name engraved on the inside of the bowl.

1907 Kenora Thistles
Players
Forwards
Billy McGimsie (center)
Harry Westwick (rover) † ‡
Fred Whitcroft(rover) † ‡
Rocque Roxy Beaudro (right wing-point)
Tom Phillips (left wing-Captain)
Russell Phillips (left-right wing)
Alf Smith (right wing)
Defencemen
Tom Hooper(point-rover)
Art Ross(point) ††
Silas Griffis (cover point)
Joe Hall(Cover point did not play)
Goaltender
Eddie Giroux

† Not part of the team when Kenora won the Stanley Cup in January 1907. Harry Westwick, Fred Whitcroft, and Alf Smith joined the team in March 1907 to play against the Brandon Wheat City in two playoff games. They also played in Stanley Cup loss to the Montreal Wanderers.

†† Left the team after winning the Stanley Cup, Art Ross, and Joe Hall and returned to play for Brandon. Kenora defeated Brandon in 2 game playoff for the Manitoba League Title/Stanley Cup. Ross & Hall played for Brandon in that series.

‡ Missing from the team picture.

non-players =

- Fred Hudson (Manager), James Link (Coach/Trainer)
- John McGillvary (Secretary/Treasurer), Lowrey Johnson (President)&

engraving-notes =

- Kenora engraved their team name inside the bowl lip of the Stanley Cup. 1907 Thistles of Kenora.

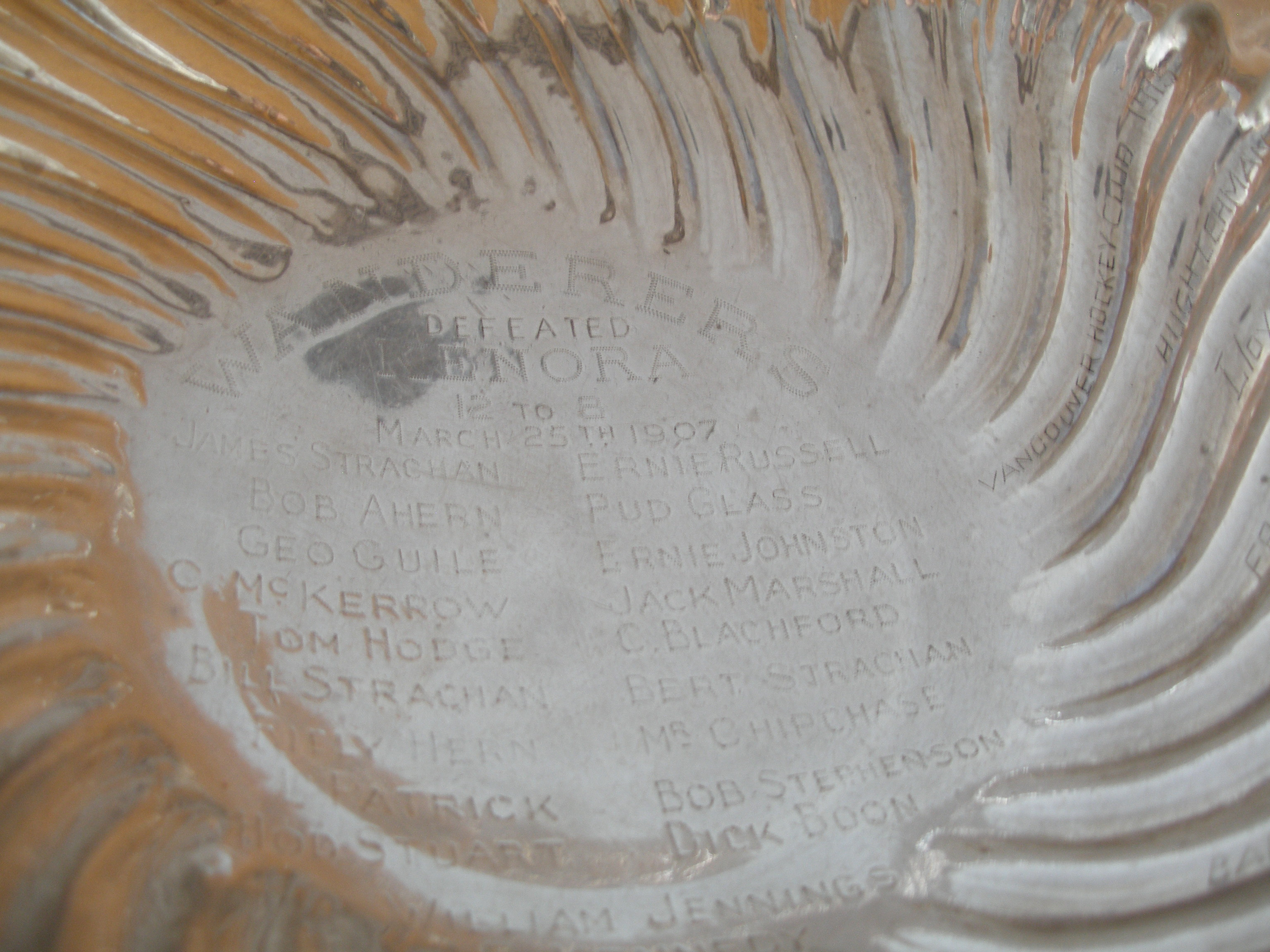
Close-up of bowl portion of Stanley Cup featuring Wanderers' names

1907 Montreal Wanderers
Players
Forwards
Frank "Pud" Glass (Rover also played wing)
Ernie Liffiton (also played wing)
Cecil Blachford (right wing-Playing-Coach) †
Jack Marshall (center)
Ernie "Moose" Johnson (left wing)
Ernie Russell (right wing-center)
Thomas Erskine (Spare) ‡
Defencemen
Rod Kennedy(Point)
Billy Strachan(point)
Lester Patrick (cover point-rover-Captain)
Hod Stuart(cover point)
William "Bill" Chipchase (spare) ††
Goaltender
William "Riley" Hern

† Cecil Blachford served as Coach when he missed part of season due to a head injury. Lester Patrick filled in as Captain.

†† Who was MR. Chipcase?. He was William "Bill" Chipcase. W was stamped upside down, looking like a Mr. Chipcase. He was the first player to have his name spelled wrong on the Stanley Cup. Chipcase and Erskine were spares who did not play for Montreal in 1907. William Chipcase's name was included on the Stanley Cup, but not Thomas Erskine's. Chipchase did play one game for the Stanley Cup-winning Wanderers in 1910.

‡ On the team picture, but missing from the Stanley Cup

non-players =

- James Strachan (President), Clarence McKerrow (Hon. President)
- Dickie Boon (Manager), George Guile (Secretary/Treasurer)
- Tom Hodge (Hon. Secretary), William Jennings (Vice President)
- Robert "Bob" Stephanson (Hon. Treasurer), Robert "Bob" Ahern (Hon. Vice President)
- Bert Strachan (Director), Filbert Strachan‡ (Director). H. Watson (Director)‡, Paul Lefebvre (Trainer - On the team picture, but missing from the Stanley Cup)

engraving-notes =

- Montreal Wanderers engraved Wanderers defeated Kenora 12 to 8 on March 25th, 1907. This was followed by 20 members' names inside the bowl of the Stanley Cup. This is the first time that winning members were officially engraved on the Stanley Cup.
- Team picture included 9 players in uniform, 15 men in suits. Not all members are known.
- After the season, the Stanley Cup was stolen from Montreal photographer Jimmy Rice's home after a team picture. When no one would pay a ransom for it, the Cup was left on Rice's doorstep, and his wife used it as a window-sill geranium planter until the fall.
- Two names, that of S. Van Sickle and H. L. Linall were ratched onto the Cup that season.

== See also ==
- 1906–07 MPHL season
- Eastern Canadian Amateur Hockey Association
- List of pre-NHL seasons
- List of ice hockey leagues
- List of Stanley Cup champions

Preceded by Montreal Wanderers; March 1906	Kenora Thistles; Stanley Cup Champions; January 1907	Succeeded by Montreal Wanderers; March 1907
Preceded by Kenora Thistles; January 1907	Montreal Wanderers; Stanley Cup Champions; March 1907	Succeeded by Montreal Wanderers; 1908
Preceded by 1906 ECAHA season	ECAHA seasons 1907	Succeeded by 1907–08 ECAHA season
