= 1906–07 MPHL season =

Ice hockey league season of play

The 1906–07 Manitoba Professional Hockey League (MPHL) season would see the 1906 MPHL champion Kenora Thistles challenge the Montreal Wanderers in a Stanley Cup challenge in January and win the MPHL championship, only to lose the Cup in a challenge in March.

== Regular season ==
The Winnipeg Hockey Club and Winnipeg Victorias left the league which now accepted professionals openly. The teams organized an amateur league.

Teams played ten games, except for Kenora, which played the Stanley Cup challenge. As a consequence, the standings were adjusted to account for the challenge.

After the Thistles won the Stanley Cup in Montreal, the team played exhibitions in Ottawa and Toronto. In the Ottawa game Billy McGimsie suffered a career-ending shoulder injury. At the time, it was not described as serious, only a "badly bruised and slightly dislocated shoulder". He played in the Thistles' next exhibition in Toronto on January 25. The team signed Fred Whitcroft to replace him. Kenora signed Alf Smith and Rat Westwick of Ottawa, whose season with the ECAHA was already over, for the final game of the season and the playoffs to play in place of future Hall of Famers Art Ross and Joe Hall who were back playing for Brandon.

All games
Team	Games Played	Wins	Losses	Ties	Pts
Brandon Wheat City	10	5	2	3	13
Portage la Prairie Plains	10	5	3	2	12
Kenora Thistles	6	4	2	0	8
Winnipeg Strathconas	10	1	8	1	3

Adjusted
Team	Games Played	Wins	Losses	Ties	Pts
Brandon Wheat City	6	4	2	0	8
Kenora Thistles	6	4	2	0	8
Portage la Prairie	6	3	3	0	6
Winnipeg Strathconas	6	1	5	0	2

Source: Zwieg, 2012

== Playoff ==
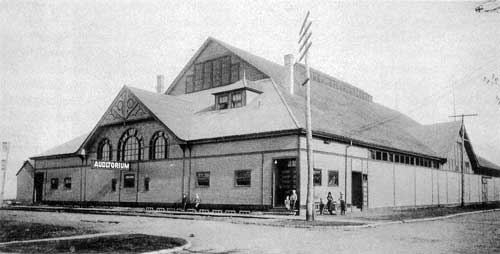
Winnipeg Auditorium, c. 1900

Kenora would play and win the MPHL playoff against Brandon to successfully defend the Cup, winning a best-of-three series 2–0. Hall and Ross played for Brandon in the series, while Smith, Westwick and Whitcroft played for the Thistles. At the time of the series, the acting Stanley Cup trustee William Foran had already declared Smith and Westwick ineligible for the challenge series. After the series was over, the Manitoba League registered their disapproval over Mr. Foran's decision to exclude the players.

Date	Winning Team	Score	Losing Team	Location
March 16, 1907	Kenora Thistles	8–6	Brandon Wheat City	Winnipeg Auditorium
March 18, 1907	Kenora Thistles	4–1	Brandon Wheat City	Winnipeg Auditorium
Kenora wins series 2–0

March 16, 1907
Brandon Wheat City	6	vs	Kenora Thistles	8
Bobby Mercer		G	Eddie Geroux
Art Leader		P	Roxy Beaudro
Art Ross		CP	Si Griffis
George Smith		RO	Harry Westwick
Joe Hall Capt.		C	Fred Whitecroft
Walter Bellamy		RW	Alf Smith
Jack Fraser		LW	Tommy Phillips, Capt.
Art Serviss -RW		spare	Tom Hopper -RO/D
Roy Armstrong -D		spare	Russell Phillips -RW/LW

March 18, 1907
Brandon Wheat City	1	vs	Kenora Thistles	4
Bobby Mercer		G	Eddie Geroux
Art Leader		P	Roxy Beaudro
Art Ross		CP	Si Griffis
George Smith		RO	Harry Westwick
Joe Hall Capt.		C	Fred Whitecroft
Walter Bellamy		RW	Alf Smith
Jack Fraser		LW	Tommy Phillips, Capt.
Art Serviss -RW		spare	Tom Hopper -RO/D
Roy Armstrong -D		spare	Russell Phillips -RW/LW

- Goal scorers in both games are unknown

== Stanley Cup challenges ==
As the Thistles were Manitoba champions for 1906, they were accepted as Stanley Cup challengers. However, the challenge did not take place until January 1907.

=== Wanderers vs. Kenora at Montreal ===
The Thistles played the Montreal Wanderers in a Stanley Cup challenge during the season, defeating the Wanderers 4–2 and 8–6 on January 17–21. Aided by future Hockey Hall of Famers Tom Hooper, Tommy Phillips, and Art Ross, the Thistles came away with 4–2 and 8–6 victories for a combined score of 12–8 to win a two-game total goals series. A "ringer", Ross was a member of the Brandon Wheat City team and was signed by Kenora for just the challenge games. Brandon's Joe Hall also signed for the challenge games and returned to Brandon afterward.

Date	Winning Team	Score	Losing Team	Location
January 17, 1907	Kenora Thistles	4–2	Montreal Wanderers	Montreal Arena
January 21, 1907	Kenora Thistles	8–6	Montreal Wanderers	Montreal Arena
Kenora wins total goals series 12 goals to 8

January 17, 1907
Montreal Wanderers	2	vs	Kenora Thistles	4
William "Riley" Hern		G	Eddie Geroux
Billy Strachan		P	Art Ross
Hod Stuart		CP	Si Griffis
Lester Patrick, Capt.	2	RO	Tom Hooper
Ernie Russell		C	Billy McGimsie
Frank "Pud" Glass		RW	Roxy Beaudro
Ernie "Moose" Johnson		LW	Tommy Phillips, Capt.	4
Jack Marshall	1	sub
Rod Kennedy		spare	Joe Hall
Bill Chipcase		spare	Russell Phillips
Referees Meldrun, Russell Bowie

January 21, 1907
Montreal Wanderers	6	vs	Kenora Thistles	8
William "Riley" Hern		G	Eddie Geroux
Rod Kennedy		P	Art Ross
Hod Stuart		CP	Si Griffis
Lester Patrick, Capt	3	RO	Tom Hooper	3
Ernie Russell	2	C	Billy McGimsie	1
Frank "Pud" Glass		RW	Roxy Beaudro	1
Ernie "Moose" Johnson		LW	Tommy Phillips, Capt.	3
Jack Marshall	1	sub
Billy Strachan		spare	Joe Hall
Bill Chipcase		spare	Russell Phillips
Referees Chittick, Shea

=== Wanderers vs. Kenora at Winnipeg ===
Kenora went ahead and used Alf Smith and Rat Westwick of Ottawa for the challenge, against the wishes of Stanley Cup trustee Mr. Foran. The series was supposed to start on March 21 in Kenora, but Montreal protested the use of Smith and Westwick, and also wanted to play the series in Winnipeg. Foran ruled that both players were ineligible. The clubs went ahead and started the series on March 23 in Winnipeg. Mr. Foran was notified by the press (inaccurately) that Montreal had dropped its protest and that the clubs intended to play anyway. Mr. Foran threatened to take the Cup back to Ottawa:

If the two clubs ignore the instructions of the cup trustees by mutually agreeing to play against Westwick and Smith when both were positively informed these men were ineligible to participate in the present cup matches, the series will be treated as void, and the cup will be taken charge of by the trustees. It will remain in their possession till the various hockey leagues can educate themselves up to a standard where decent sport will be the order of the day.”

The teams went ahead and played the series. However, Mr. Foran changed his mind after the Wanderers won the Cup, stating that the Wanderers could keep the Cup, because they had not rescinded their protest.

Date	Winning Team	Score	Losing Team	Location
March 23, 1907	Montreal Wanderers	7–2	Kenora Thistles	Winnipeg Auditorium
March 25, 1907	Kenora Thistles	6–5	Montreal Wanderers	Winnipeg Auditorium
Montreal wins total goals series 12 goals to 8

March 23, 1907
Montreal Wanderers	7	at	Kenora Thistles	2
William "Riley" Hern		G	Eddie Geroux
Lester Patrick, Capt.		P	Tom Hooper
Hod Stuart		CP	Si Griffis
Frank "Pud" Glass	2	RO	Harry "Rat" Westwick
Ernie Russell	4	C	Fred Whitecroft
Cecil Blachford		RW	Alf Smith	1
Ernie "Moose" Johnson	1	LW	Tommy Phillips, Capt.	1
Bill Chipcase		spare	Roxy Beaudro
T. Erskine & Rod Kennedy		spare	Russell Phillips
Referee- W. MacFarlane
Referee W. Kean

March 25, 1907
Montreal Wanderers	5	at	Kenora Thistles	6
William "Riley" Hern		G	Eddie Geroux
Lester Patrick, Capt.	1	P	Roxy Beaudro	1
Hod Stuart		CP	Si Griffis	1
Frank "Pud" Glass	1	RO	Harry "Rat" Westwick
Ernie Russell	1	C	Fred Whitecroft	2
Cecil Blachford		RW	Alf Smith	1
Ernie "Moose' Johnson	2	LW	Tommy Phillips, Capt.	1
T. Erskine & Rod Kennedy		spare	Russell Phillips
Bill Chipcase		spare	Tom Hooper
Referee- W. MacFarlane
Referee W. Kean

== Kenora Thistles - January–March 1907 Stanley Cup champions ==
=== Players ===
Centres

Wingers

- Roxy Beaudro (also played point)
- Tom Phillips(Captain)
- Russell Phillips
- Alf Smith(right wing)†&

Defencemen

- Tom Hooper(also played Rover)
- Art Ross(Point)††
- Silas Griffis(Cover point)
- Joe Hall(Cover point did not play)††

Goaltenders

- Eddie Giroux

=== Coaching and administrative staff ===
- Fred Hudson (Manager), James Link (Coach/Trainer)
- J.F McGillvary@ (Secretary/Treasurer), Lowrey Johnson (President)&
- † Not part of team when Kenora won the Stanley Cup in January 1907. However, Harry Westwick, Fred Whitcroft, and Alf Smith joined the team in March 1907 to play against the Brandon Wheat Kings in 2 playoff games.
- †† Left the team after winning the Stanley Cup, Art Ross, and Joe Hall were not part of the team, when Kenora defeated Brandon in 2 game playoff for Manitoba League Title/Stanley Cup.

@unknown first name.

- &-Missing from the team picture.

=== Stanley Cup engraving ===
Kenora engraved their name inside the bowl of the Stanley Cup. 1907 Thistles of Kenora .

== See also ==
- 1907 ECAHA season
- List of Stanley Cup champions

Preceded by 1905–06	MHA seasons 1906–07	Succeeded by 1907–08
