= 1904–05 FAHL season =

Ice hockey season

The 1904–05 Federal Amateur Hockey League (FAHL) season lasted from December 31, 1904, until March 3. Teams played an eight-game schedule.

== League business ==
The Ottawa Hockey Club, who officially joined the FAHL prior to the end of the previous season, played its first full season in the league. Montreal Le National left the league and joined the rival Canadian Amateur Hockey League (CAHL). Ottawa had negotiated with the CAHL to return, along with the Wanderers joining, but this was turned down. The Ottawa Capitals also left the FAHL.

== Pre-season ==
The Wanderers played an exhibition series in New York City in December 1904. One game, versus the New York Athletic Club, was noted for its rough play by the Wanderers.

== Regular season ==
The newly transferred Ottawa Hockey Club won the league championship – and retained the Stanley Cup – with a record of seven wins and one loss.

=== Highlights ===
Ottawa's Frank McGee scored five goals against the Montagnards on February 4.

=== Final standing ===
Note GP = Games Played, W = Wins, L = Losses, T = Ties, GF = Goals For, GA = Goals Against

Team	GP	W	L	T	GF	GA
Ottawa Hockey Club	8	7	1	0	60	19
Montreal Wanderers	8	6	2	0	44	27
Brockville	8	4	4	0	34	30
Cornwall HC	8	3	5	0	18	37
Montreal Montagnards	8	0	8	0	19	62

=== Results ===
Month	Day	Visitor	Score	Home	Score
Dec.	31	Cornwall	4	Wanderers	6
Jan.	2	Montagnards	3	Brockville	10
Jan.	7	Wanderers	3	Ottawa	9
Jan.	11	Cornwall	2	Brockville	3
Jan.	13	Wanderers	6	Montagnards	1
Jan.	21	Montagnards	2	Cornwall	4
Jan.	23	Ottawa	3	Brockville	5
Jan.	27	Cornwall	3	Montagnards	2
Jan.	28	Wanderers	3	Brockville	2
Feb.	1	Brockville	4	Wanderers	8
Feb.	1	Ottawa	7	Cornwall	2
Feb.	4	Montagnards	4	Ottawa	14
Feb.	8	Brockville	0	Ottawa	7
Feb.	11	Ottawa	4	Wanderers	2
Feb.	13	Brockville	1	Cornwall	2
Feb.	17	Brockville	9	Montagnards	2
Feb.	18	Wanderers	7	Cornwall	1
Feb.	24	Cornwall	0	Ottawa	9
Feb.	25	Montagnards	2	Wanderers	9
Mar.	3 (†)	Ottawa	7	Montagnards	3

† Ottawa HC lock down League Championship, retain Stanley Cup.

== Player Statistics ==
=== Scoring leaders ===
Note: GP = Games played, G = Goals scored

Name	Club	GP	G
Frank McGee	Ottawa	6	17
Jack Marshall	Wanderers	8	17
Harry Westwick	Ottawa	8	15
Alf Smith	Ottawa	8	13
Cecil Blachford	Wanderers	7	10
Frank Glass	Wanderers	6	9
Bill Lannon	Brockville	8	7
Hamby Shore	Ottawa	3	6
Jack Marks	Brockville	8	6
Bob Mallette	Cornwall	8	5

=== Goaltender averages ===
Note: GP = Games played, GA = Goals against, SO = Shutouts, GAA = Goals against average

Name	Club	GP	GA	SO	GAA
Dave Finnie	Ottawa	8	19	2	2.4
Bill Baker	Wanderers	7	23	0	3.3
Bill Kerr	Brockville	8	30	0	3.8
Napoleon Lavigne	Montagnards	1	4	0	4.0
George Broughton	Wanderers	1	4	0	4.0
Jack Hunter	Cornwall	8	37	0	4.6
Henri Menard	Montagnards	7	58	0	8.3

== Stanley Cup challenges ==
=== Ottawa vs. Dawson City ===
The Klondike Hockey Club, in a letter dated August 24, 1904, from team president Weldy Young, a former Ottawa player, issued a challenge to the Ottawa Hockey Club. The Dawson City team had won no championships and was not a member of any recognized senior league, yet Stanley Cup trustees P.D. Ross and John Sweetland approved the challenge. Author Paul Kitchen has speculated that the series was approved because Young knew both Ross and federal government minister Clifford Sifton.

In January 1905, the Dawson City Nuggets travelled 4,000 miles (6,400 km) from the Yukon to Ottawa for a best-of-three Cup challenge series. The Nuggets actually left Dawson City on December 19, 1904, and travelled on a month-long journey by dog sled (Dawson to Whitehorse), ship (Skagway to Vancouver), and train (Whitehorse to Skagway, and Vancouver to Ottawa). The team was no match for the Silver Seven. Ottawa defeated them in the first game, 9–2. Numerous Stanley Cup records were then set in game two, including Frank McGee's 14 goals, which included eight consecutive goals scored in less than nine minutes, and a 23–2 rout, the largest margin of victory for any challenge game or Stanley Cup Finals game to date.

Several players playing for Dawson were from the Ottawa area. Jim Johnstone was from Ottawa. Norman Watt was from Aylmer, Quebec. Randy McLennan had played in a Stanley Cup challenge for Queen's University of Kingston, Ontario. Another player has Stanley Cup challenge experience: Lorne Hanna, "formerly of the Yukon", had played for Brandon Wheat City in their 1904 challenge of Ottawa.

Date	Winning Team	Score	Losing Team	Location
January 13, 1905	Ottawa HC	9–2	Dawson City Nuggets	Dey's Arena
January 16, 1905	Ottawa HC	23–2	Dawson City Nuggets	Dey's Arena
Ottawa wins best-of-three series 2 games to 0

January 13, 1905
Ottawa HC	9		Dawson	2
Dave Finnie		G	Albert Forrest	
Arthur "Bones" Allen		P	Jim Johnstone	
Arthur Moore		CP	Lorne Hanna^{A}	
Harry Westwick	2	RO	Randy McLennan	1
Frank McGee	1	C	Hector Smith	
Alf Smith	4	RW	George Kennedy	1
Fred White	2	LW	Norman Watt	
Referee – Harlow Stiles, Cornwall^{B}

A. Coleman lists spelling as Lorne Hanna, other spellings include Hannay (Reddick's spelling) and Hanney (in The Globe article)
B. Coleman lists E. Butterworth as referee. However, Boyle is recorded as complaining about Stiles missing off-side calls.

Source: Coleman

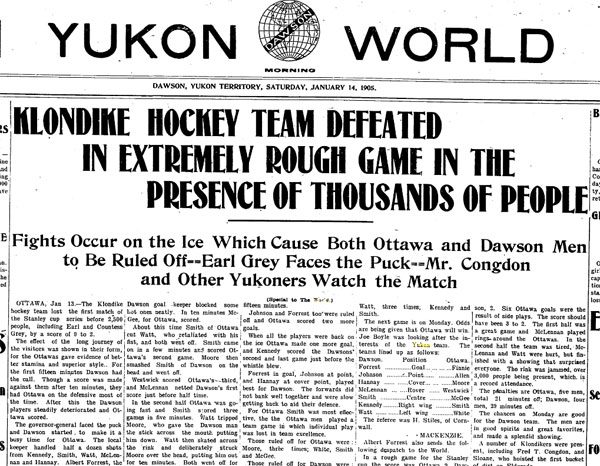
According to The Globe:

The score was 9 to 2 but Ottawa might have increased its proportions had they set to work to run up a score on the men who had travelled 4,000 miles from the far north in quest of the trophy. During the first twenty minutes of play, the challenging team made a remarkably fine showing against the champions, but after that they gradually faded away and were never seriously in the running, indicating that the chief fault with the team is that they are not in condition to stand the test of a hard battle after their long trip of 23 days from the north. While defeated to-night, it is undoubtedly the fact that the team will be a different proportion in the second game on Monday.

Sources:

- The Globe, January 14, 1905
- Fischler

January 16, 1905
Ottawa HC	23		Dawson	2
Dave Finnie		G	Albert Forrest	
Harvey Pulford		P	Jim Johnstone	
Arthur Moore		CP	Lorne Hanna	
Harry Westwick	5	RO	Dave Fairburn	
Frank McGee	14	C	Hector Smith	2
Alf Smith	3	RW	George Kennedy	
Fred White	1	LW	Norman Watt	
Referee – E. Butterworth, Ottawa

Source: Coleman, pg. 112

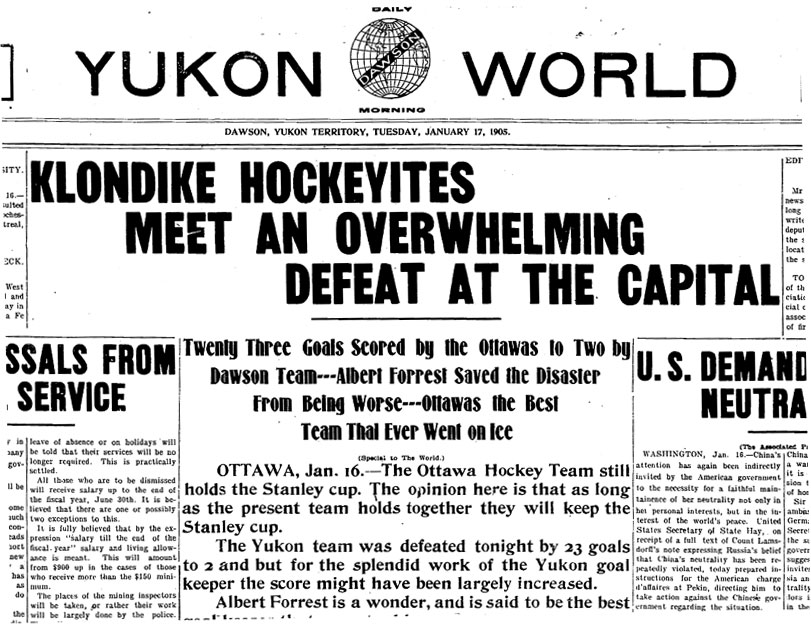
After the second game, The Globe reported:

The visiting team was outclassed to-night quite as decisively as the score indicates. In fact had it not been for the fact of Forrest's presence in the Dawson goal the score against them might have been a great deal larger. Ottawa simply skated away from them at the whistle and continued to pile up the goals with a merciless monotonous regularity which was farcical in the extreme.

Sources:

- The Globe, January 17, 1905
- Fischler

After the series, Ottawa held a banquet for Dawson City at the Ottawa Amateur Athletic Association (OAAA) clubhouse. There is a Stanley Cup legend that after the banquet, the Stanley Cup was drop kicked into the frozen Rideau Canal nearby and retrieved the next day. However, Bill Westwick, Ottawa Journal sports editor and the son of Silver Seven player Rat Westwick, and NHL commissioner Frank Calder both deny it ever happened.

=== Ottawa vs. Rat Portage Thistles ===
In March 1905, the Rat Portage Thistles issued another challenge to the Ottawas. McGee did not play in the first game and the Thistles crushed Ottawa, 9–3. However, he returned to lead Ottawa to 4–2 and 5–4 victories in games two and three, respectively. McGee returned in game two, with his good forearm wrapped in a cast, and only a light bandage on his broken wrist, to decoy the Thistles. Alf Smith scored three goals in game two on slow ice, which the Thistles claimed was salted to slow down the Thistles. There was hard ice in game three, and the lead exchanged hands several times. The Thistles led 2–1 at halftime and 3–2 midway through the second half. Ottawa took a 4–3 lead, before Tommy Phillips scored his third of the game to tie the score. However, McGee came through with the winning score late in the game to win it for Ottawa.

Date	Winning Team	Score	Losing Team	Location
March 7, 1905	Rat Portage Thistles	9–3	Ottawa	Dey's Arena
March 9, 1905	Ottawa	4–2	Rat Portage Thistles	Dey's Arena
March 11, 1905	Ottawa	5–4	Rat Portage Thistles	Dey's Arena
Ottawa wins best-of-three series two games to one.

March 7, 1905
Rat Portage	9		Ottawa HC	3
Eddie Giroux		G	Dave Finnie	
Matt Brown		P	Harvey Pulford, Capt.	
Theophile Bellefuille	1	CP	Arthur Moore	
Si Griffis	2	R	Harry Westwick	1
Billy McGimsie		C	Horace Gaul	
Tom Hopper	1	RW	Alf Smith	
Tommy Phillips, Capt.	5	LW	Hamby Shore	2
Referee - Hartland McDougall

- Spare - Rat Portage - Roxy Beaudro -LW/D
- Spare - Ottawa - Arthur "Bones" Allen -D, Billy Bawlf -F Billy Gilmour -LW, Fred White -F

March 9, 1905
Rat Portage	2		Ottawa HC	4
Eddie Giroux		G	Dave Finnie	
Matt Brown		P	Harvey Pulford, Capt.	
Theophile Bellefuille		CP	Arthur Moore	
Si Griffis	1	R	Harry Westwick	
Billy McGimsie		C	Frank McGee	
Tom Hopper	1	RW	Alf Smith	3
Tommy Phillips, Capt.		LW	Billy Gilmour	1
Referee - Mike Grant

- Spare - Rat Portage - Roxy Beaudro - LW/D
- Spare - Ottawa - Arthur "Bones" Allen -D, Billy Bawlf -F, Hamby Shore -RW, Fred White -F

March 11, 1905
Rat Portage	4		Ottawa HC	5
Eddie Giroux		G	Dave Finnie	
Matt Brown		P	Harvey Pulford, Capt.	
Theophile Bellefuille		CP	Arthur Moore	
Si Griffis		R	Harry Westwick	1
Billy McGimsie		C	Frank McGee	3
Tom Hopper	1	RW	Alf Smith	1
Tommy Phillips, Capt.	3	LW	Billy Gilmour	
Referee - Mike Grant

- Spare - Rat Portage - Roxy Beaudro - LW/D
- Spare - Ottawa - Arthur "Bones" Allen - D, Billy Bawlf - F, Hamby Shore - RW, Fred White - F

== Stanley Cup engravings ==
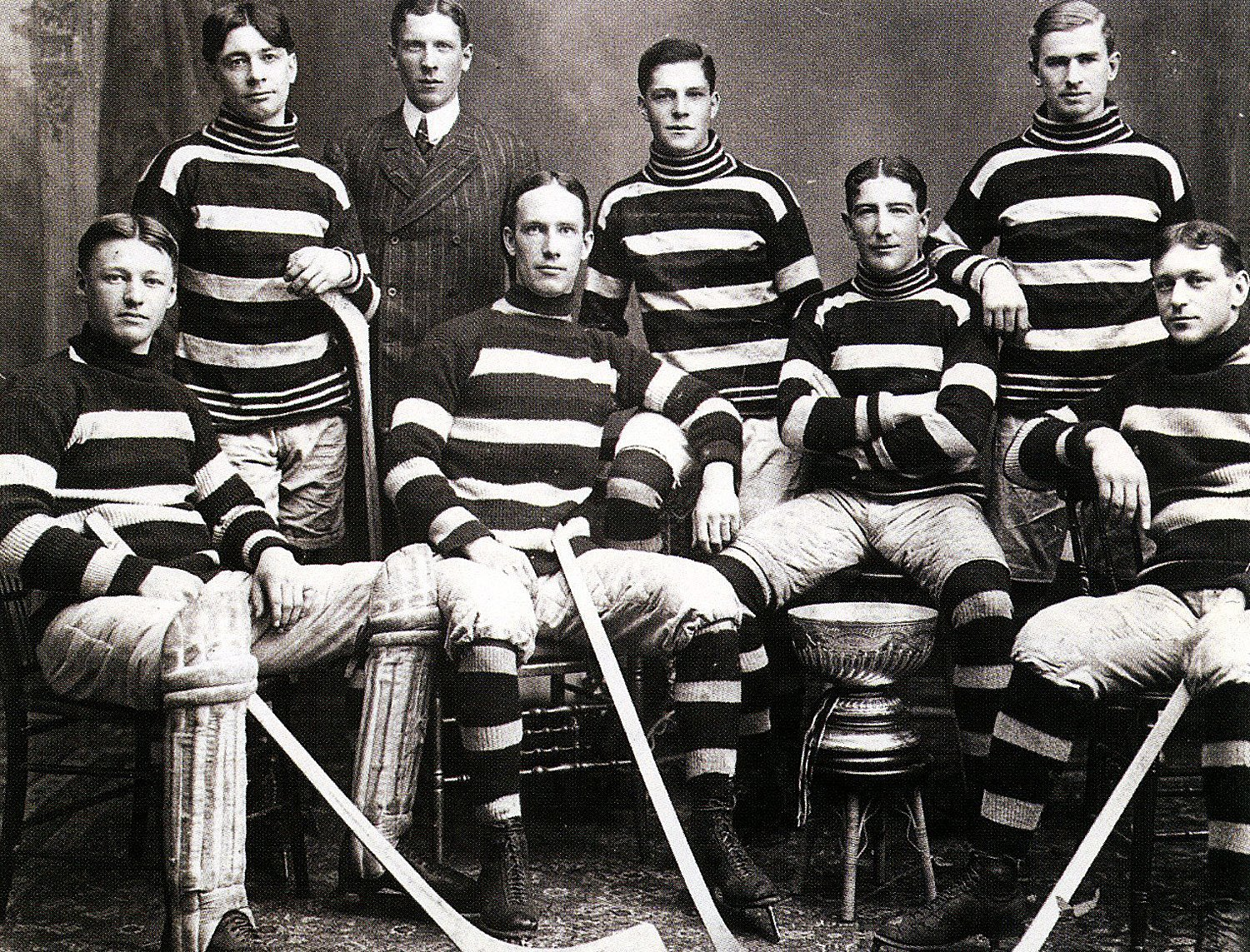
The Ottawa Hockey Club in 1905

The Ottawa Hockey Club
Players
Forwards
Frank McGee (Center)
Harry Westwick (Rover)
Hamilton "Billy" Gilmour (left-right wing)
Horace Gaul (center)
Hamilton Hamby Shore (left wing)
Alf Smith (right wing-playing-coach)
Fred White
Billy Bawlf
Defencemen
Harvey Pulford (Point-Captain)
Angus "Bones" Allen (point)
Arthur Moore (cover point)
Goaltender
Dave Finnie

=== Non-players ===
- George P. Murphy (President), Robert T. "Bob" Shillington (manager)
- Patrick Baskerville (treasurer), Thomas D'Arcy McGee (secretary)
- Halder Kirby (club doctor), David Barred (team dentist)
- Llewellyn Bates, John Proctor "J.P." Dickson, Martin Rosenthal, Charles Sparks (directors)
- Pete Green (trainer), Mac MacGilton (ass't trainer)

==== Engraving notes ====
- For many years, a player named McDonald was credited with scoring a goal for the Ottawa Silver Sevens. No player named McDonald played for Ottawa in 1905. February 24, 1905, after a shot by Hamby Shore was stopped by Cornwall goalie Jack Hunter, Garnet McDonald of Cornwall, in a zealous effort to clear the puck, accidentally put in his own net. The goal was recorded for Ottawa.
- Patrick "Paddy" Moran name was dotted P. MORAN under the Ottawa vs Dawson engraving on the bowl of the Stanley Cup. The engraving was most likely added during one of the Quebec Bulldogs' Stanley Cup wins in 1912 or 1913.
- Tommy Smith name was scratched T SMITH next to 1905 Ottawa vs Kenora. Tommy Smith won the Stanley Cup in 1906 with Ottawa and in 1913 with Quebec. The name was likely added in 1913.
- Weldy Young, a former member of the Ottawa team in the 1890s and the captain of the Dawson City team, engraved his name on the Cup with a penknife. He had missed playing for Dawson as he was working in the federal election, although he did arrive in Ottawa during the series.

== See also ==
- List of Stanley Cup challenge games
- List of Stanley Cup champions
- List of pre-NHL seasons
- List of ice hockey leagues
- 1905 CAHL season

Preceded by Ottawa Hockey Club; 1904	Ottawa Hockey Club; Stanley Cup Champions; 1905	Succeeded by Ottawa Hockey Club; January 1906
Preceded by 1904 FAHL season	FAHL seasons 1904–05	Succeeded by 1905–06 FAHL season
