= Frederick Hudson =

Frederick Hudson may refer to:

- Frederick Hudson (cricketer)
- Frederick Hudson (photographer)
- Frederick Mitchell Hudson, lawyer and politician in Florida
- Fred Hudson (Frederick Albert Hudson), Canadian ice hockey manager

== See also ==
- Frederic Hudson, American newspaper editor
- Frederic M. Hudson, American philosopher, educator and writer
