= Manitoba & Northwestern Hockey Association =

Amateur ice hockey league

The Manitoba & Northwestern Hockey Association was an early senior-level men's amateur ice hockey league, founded in 1903, and played one season, 1903-1904 before joining the Manitoba Hockey Association. It operated in the provinces of Manitoba and Ontario of Canada, and was an important league in the early development of ice hockey in Canada.

== Teams ==
- Brandon Wheat City Hockey Club
- Portage la Prairie Plains
- Rat Portage Thistles

== 1903-04 Season ==
| Team | Games Played | Wins | Losses | Ties | Goals For | Goals Against |
|---|---|---|---|---|---|---|
| Brandon Wheat City | 12 | 9 | 3 | 0 | 56 | 26 |
| Rat Portage Thistles | 12 | 8 | 4 | 0 | 57 | 35 |
| Portage la Prairie Plains | 12 | 1 | 11 | 0 | 21 | 73 |

League leaders

| Player | Team | Goals |
|---|---|---|
| Billy McGimsie | Rat Portage | 14 |
| Harry Bright | Brandon | 13 |
| Si Griffis | Rat Portage | 12 |
| Jack Brodie | Brandon | 9 |

== Stanley Cup Challenge ==
In March 1903, the Rat Portage Thistles would challenge the Ottawa Senators in a best-of-three series in Ottawa. The Thistles were younger and quicker than Ottawa; only one player on the Thistles was over the age of 20. However, poor soft ice conditions in Ottawa played a major factor as Ottawa swept the series with scores of 6–2 and 4–2.

| Date | Winning Team | Score | Losing Team | Location |
|---|---|---|---|---|
| March 12, 1903 | Ottawa HC | 6–2 | Rat Portage Thistles | Dey's Arena |
| March 14, 1903 | Ottawa HC | 4–2 | Rat Portage Thistles | Dey's Arena |
Ottawa HC wins best-of-three series 2 games to 0

March 12
| Rat Portage | 2 | at | Ottawa HC | 6 |
|---|---|---|---|---|
| Fred Dulmage | | G | John "Bouse" Hutton |
| Mat Brown | | P | Harvey Pulford, Capt |
| Tom Hooper, Capt | | CP | Arthur Moore |
| Si Griffis | | RO | Dave Gilmour | 1 |
| Billy McGimsie | 2 | C | Frank McGee | 2 |
| Bill Martin | | LW | Billy Gilmour | 3 |
| Roxy Beaudro | | RW | Suddy Gilmour |
Referee- Harry Trihey

March 14
| Rat Portage | 2 | at | Ottawa HC | 4 |
|---|---|---|---|---|
| Fred Dulmage | | G | John "Bouse" Hutton |
| Mat Brown | | P | Harvey Pulford, Capt |
| Tom Hooper, Capt | | CP | Dave Gilmour | 1 |
| Si Griffis | | RO | Frank McGee | 2 |
| Billy McGimsie | 1 | C | Percy Sims | 1 |
| Bill Martin | | RW | Billy Gilmour |
| Roxy Beaudro | 1 | LW | Suddy Gilmour |
Referee- Chauncy Kirby
