= Tom Hooper (disambiguation) =

Tom Hooper is a British film and television director.

Tom Hooper may also refer to:

- Tom Hooper (ice hockey) (1883–1960), Canadian ice hockey player
- Tom Hooper (musician), Canadian songwriter and musician
- Tom Hooper (rugby union), Australian rugby union player

== See also ==
- Tom Hopper, English actor
- Tom Hopper (footballer), English professional footballer
