= 1904–05 MHA season =

Ice hockey league season of play

The 1904–05 Manitoba Hockey Association (MHA) season was won by the Rat Portage Thistles. After the season the Thistles challenged Ottawa for the Stanley Cup, but lost in a three-game series.

== Regular season ==
=== Highlights ===
Tom Phillips returned to the Thistles after attending McGill University and a year in Toronto. Phillips brought along goaltender Eddie Giroux, with whom he had played with in the 1903–04 season for the Toronto Marlboros.

=== Final standing ===
Team	Games Played	Wins	Losses	Ties	Points
Rat Portage Thistles	8	7	1	0	14
Winnipeg Rowing Club	10	6	3	1	12
Portage la Prairie Bisons	10	4	5	1	9
Brandon Wheat City	10	4	6	0	8
Winnipeg Victorias	10	2	8	0	2

Source: Zweig, 2012.

== Stanley Cup Challenges ==
After the season, the Thistles challenged the Ottawa Hockey Club in Ottawa

=== Rat Portage vs. Ottawa ===
In March 1905, the Rat Portage Thistles issued another challenge to the Senators. The Ottawa star Frank McGee did not play in the first game and the Thistles crushed Ottawa, 9–3. However, he returned to lead the Senators to 4–2 and 5–4 victories in games two and three, respectively. McGee scored the winning goal in the third game.

Date	Winning Team	Score	Losing Team	Location
March 7, 1905	Rat Portage Thistles	9–3	Ottawa Senators	Dey's Arena
March 9, 1905	Ottawa Senators	4–2	Rat Portage Thistles	Dey's Arena
March 11, 1905	Ottawa Senators	5–4	Rat Portage Thistles	Dey's Arena
Ottawa wins best-of-three series 2 games to 1

== See also ==
- List of Stanley Cup champions

Preceded by 1903–04	MHA seasons 1904–05	Succeeded by 1905–06
