= 1921 Allan Cup =

Canadian senior ice hockey championship

The Allan Cup was the championship trophy for amateur senior ice hockey overseen by the CAHA.

The 1921 Allan Cup was the senior ice hockey championship of the Canadian Amateur Hockey Association (CAHA) for the 1920–21 season.

The CAHA had an agreement since 1918 which limited the location of the Allan Cup finals or semi-final games to Montreal, Toronto, Winnipeg or Regina. CAHA president H. J. Sterling chose Winnipeg as the host location for the 1921 finals at an arena with an artificial ice surface. The Manitoba Amateur Hockey Association (MAHA) and the Brandon Wheat City Hockey Club wanted to have the games played at the rink in Brandon, Manitoba and contested that Sterling was incorrect to make the decision himself without consulting the CAHA executive. They sought an injunction against Sterling to prevent the games from being played in Winnipeg, but were denied when the justice declined to interfere in CAHA business. Sterling presented the trophy to the Allan Cup champions Toronto Varsity Blues men's ice hockey team who defeated the Brandon Wheat City Hockey Club in the finals.

== Final ==
- Brandon 2 University of Toronto 0
- University of Toronto 8 Brandon 1

The University of Toronto Varsity Blues defeated the Brandon Wheat City Hockey Club 8 goals to 3.
