= Frederick Hudson (cricketer) =

English cricketer

Personal information
- Full name: Frederick John Hudson
- Born: 22 November 1878; Bottesford, Leicestershire, England
- Died: 7 October 1966 (aged 87); Bottesford, Leicestershire, England
- Batting: Right-handed
- Bowling: Unknown

Domestic team information
- Years: Team
- 1901: Leicestershire

Career statistics
| Competition | First-class |
|---|---|
| Matches | 1 |
| Runs scored | 1 |
| Batting average | 0.50 |
| 100s/50s | –/– |
| Top score | 1 |
| Balls bowled | 90 |
| Wickets | – |
| Bowling average | – |
| 5 wickets in innings | – |
| 10 wickets in match | – |
| Best bowling | – |
| Catches/stumpings | –/– |
- Source: Cricinfo, 2 March 2012

Frederick John Hudson (22 November 1878 – 7 October 1966) was an English cricketer. Hudson was a right-handed batsman whose bowling style is unknown. He was born at Bottesford, Leicestershire.

== Career ==
Hudson made a single first-class appearance for Leicestershire against Surrey in the 1901 County Championship at The Oval. Surrey won the toss and elected to bat, making 423 in their first-innings, during which Hudson bowled 15 wicketless overs. In response, Leicestershire made 224 in their first-innings, with Hudson being dismissed for a duck by Tom Richardson. Leicestershire were forced to follow-on in their second-innings, this time making an improved 385, although Hudson only contributed a single run before he was bowled by Digby Jephson. Set 187 to win, Surrey reached 104/4, before the match was declared a draw. This was his only major appearance for Leicestershire.

== Death ==
He died at the place of his birth on 7 October 1966.
