= Roxy Beaudro =

American ice hockey player

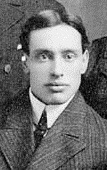
- Born: February 29, 1884; Red Lake Falls, Minnesota, USA
- Died: February 10, 1960 (aged 75); Barrie, Ontario, Canada
- Height: 5 ft 8 in (173 cm)
- Weight: 175 lb (79 kg; 12 st 7 lb)
- Position: Right wing
- Shot: Right
- Played for: Kenora Thistles; Toronto 228th Battalion
- Playing career: 1896–1917

Rocque Francis "Roxy" Beaudro (February 29, 1884 – February 10, 1960) was a Canadian amateur, and later professional, ice hockey winger. He was a member of the 1907 Stanley Cup champion Kenora Thistles.

== Playing career ==
Born in Red Lake Falls, Minnesota on February 29, 1884, Beaudro moved to the Rat Portage, Ontario area in the early 1890s. At a young age he developed an interest in ice hockey and by 1896 had joined a team of other local boys, including future Hockey Hall of Famers Tommy Phillips, Si Griffis, Billy McGimsie, and Tom Hooper.

Beaudro played for the Rat Portage Thistles (later the Kenora Thistles) from 1896 to 1907, competing in five Stanley Cup series; one in 1903 and 1905 (as a spare), and three in 1907. Beaudro scored the game winning, series clinching goal in game two of Kenora's successful Stanley Cup match vs. the Montreal Wanderers in January 1907.

After several years of retirement from 1907 to 1916, Beaudro returned to play for the NHA's Toronto 228th Battalion squad in 1916–17, playing eight games with the team as a defenceman before shipping overseas to fight in World War I.

== Personal ==
As a member of the 228th Battalion, Beaudro earned the rank of captain. Prior to entering the 228th, Beaudro was an accountant.

Beaudro returned from the war and later settled in Toronto, attending Toronto Maple Leafs games as a guest of announcer Foster Hewitt.

Beaudro was a Roman Catholic.

== Death ==
After a short battle with cancer, Beaudro died on February 10, 1960, in Barrie, Ontario. He was 75 years old.
