= James Link =

Canadian ice hockey coach and athletic trainer

James Arthur Link (February 27, 1874 – March 21, 1964) was the coach and athletic trainer of the Kenora Thistles during the team's three Stanley Cup challenges in 1903, 1905, and 1907. He was born in Rat Portage, Ontario, Canada.

In 1907, James Link coached Kenora to the Stanley Cup Championships, the smallest city ever to win the Stanley Cup. He was also member of the Rat Portage Rowing Club. Link died March 21, 1964, in Vancouver, British Columbia.
