= Bill Chipchase =

Canadian ice hockey player

- Born: November 6, 1885; Montreal, Quebec, Canada
- Died: April 30, 1941 (aged 55)
- Height: 5 ft 11 in (180 cm)
- Weight: 175 lb (79 kg; 12 st 7 lb)
- Position: Left wing
- Shot: Left
- Played for: Montreal Wanderers
- Playing career: 1900–1911

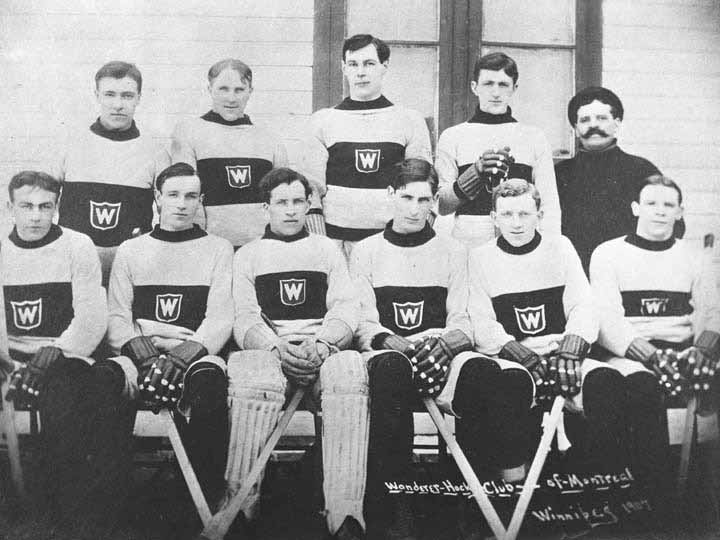
Chipchase (bottom left corner) with the 1907 Montreal Wanderers in Winnipeg.

William Henry Chipchase (November 6, 1885 – April 30, 1941) was a Canadian professional ice hockey player. He played left wing for the Montreal Wanderers of the National Hockey Association.

== Biography ==
In 1910, Montreal Wanderers won the Stanley Cup. Bill Chipchase played one regular season for the team that season, and his name is also on the Stanley Cup with the 1907 Montreal Wanderers. He dressed but did not play in the 1907 challenge series in Winnipeg on March 23 and 25. This was the series where the Wanderers regained the Stanley Cup that the club lost to the Kenora Thistles in January 1907. His name was spelt as "Mr. Chipchase" instead of "W. R. Chipchase", as the W was listed upside down as an M. This was the first name that was spelt wrong in Stanley Cup history.
