= Si Griffis =

Canadian ice hockey player (1883–1950)

- Hockey Hall of Fame, 1950
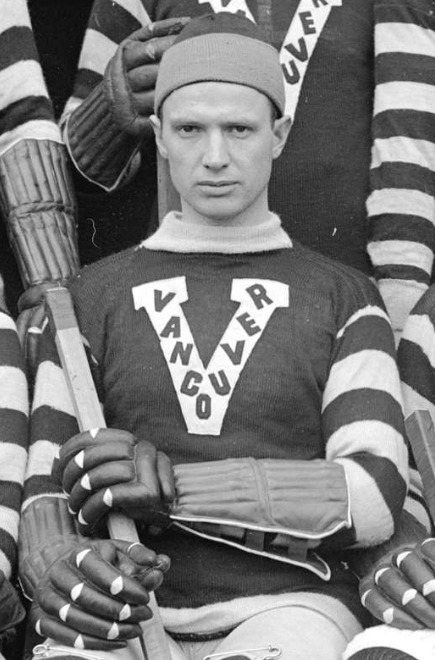
- Griffis with the Vancouver Millionaires
- Born: September 22, 1883 Onaga, Kansas, U.S.
- Died: July 9, 1950 (aged 66) Vancouver, British Columbia, Canada
- Height: 6 ft 1 in (185 cm)
- Weight: 195 lb (88 kg; 13 st 13 lb)
- Position: Defence
- Shot: Left
- Played for: Vancouver Millionaires; Kenora Thistles
- Playing career: 1901–1919

Silas Seth Griffis (September 22, 1883 – July 9, 1950) was a Canadian athlete of the early 20th century. In ice hockey, Griffis was a two-time Stanley Cup winner, with the 1907 Kenora Thistles and the 1915 Vancouver Millionaires. He is an inductee of the Hockey Hall of Fame.

Born in Onaga, Kansas, Griffis moved with his family to Rat Portage, Ontario, where he excelled in many sports, including ice hockey.

== Playing career ==
Notable for his speed, Griffis played both rover and cover-point in the seven-man configuration of the day. When the Manitoba & Northwestern Hockey Association formed in 1902, Griffis joined the Rat Portage Thistles, and led them to its first league titles in 1903, after which it issued a challenge for the Stanley Cup against the powerful Ottawa Silver Seven, in which the Thistles lost a best-of-three to Ottawa in two games straight. The team's second league title came in 1905, along with another losing Stanley Cup challenge to the Silver Seven. Griffis scored a natural hat trick to lead the Thistles to a victory in the first game of the three-game series, and added a goal in the second. (Note: Some sources erroneously report that Griffis only scored three goals in the series.)

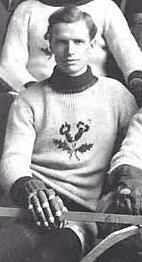
Griffis with the Thistles in 1907

Renamed the Kenora Thistles in 1907 — the city had changed its name in 1905 — the team remained a powerhouse, and Griffis (along with fellow future Hall of Famers Art Ross and Tommy Smith) was a key member of the Thistles' January 1907 Stanley Cup winning team when they defeated the Montreal Wanderers in a two-game total goal series, the only games in the entire season which the Wanderers lost. While the Thistles defended the Cup against a challenge in March 1907 from the Brandon Wheat Kings, the Wanderers issued a second challenge for the Cup later that month, which the Thistles lost.

After taking a hiatus of several years from the game—save for an unknown number of games for the Nelson Hockey Club of the West Kootenay League in 1910—Griffis was signed out of retirement by Frank Patrick in 1912 as his defence partner for the Vancouver Millionaires of the Pacific Coast Hockey Association. A noted leader, Griffis was named team captain in 1914–15, the year the Millionaires themselves won the Cup. Griffis broke his leg in the last regular season match of that year, and was not able to play in the final series against the Ottawa Senators, but recovered enough to play in two exhibition games for a group of PCHL All-Stars.

After Patrick's retirement as a fulltime player and with Lloyd Cook as his new defence partner, Griffis played four more seasons for Vancouver, although injuries started seriously affecting his playing time by 1918; nonetheless, he played effectively in the Millionaires' PCHA playoff win and its run as a finalist for the Stanley Cup that same year. Signed in 1919 on an emergency basis at age 35, he played only two games for Vancouver in 1919, as well as in its playoff loss that season to the Seattle Metropolitans. Being noted by observers as "having little left," it was Griffis' last professional action, after which he retired.

== Retirement ==
Griffis was an accomplished rower as well, being a medalist in the 1905 Royal Canadian Henley Regatta.

In later life, Griffis excelled as both a competitive golfer and bowler. He was elected to the Hockey Hall of Fame in July 1950. He died in Vancouver, British Columbia, that same month. He is also a 1987 inductee to the Northwestern Ontario Sports Hall of Fame.

== Playing style ==
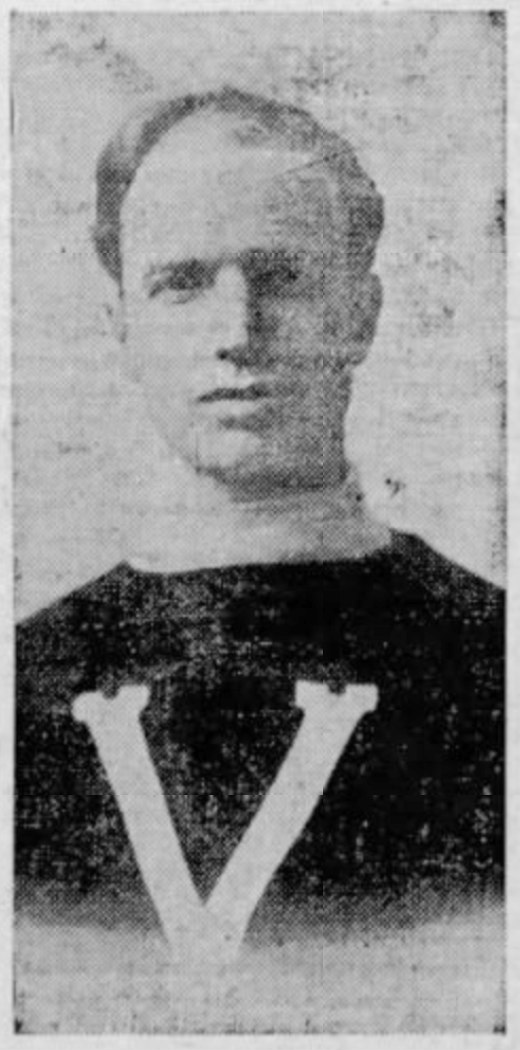
Griffis in 1912–13.

Si Griffis, standing at 6 feet and one inch, was one of the tallest players of his era but he was nonetheless also one of its fastest skaters.

"I can get away faster than most of them, and then they have to pass me, which is some feat. Of course, I'm going to win."

— Griffis betting on himself before the 1913 PCHA speed skating contest.

During the 1912–13 PCHA season – on January 15, 1913 – league executive Frank Patrick organized a speed skating contest between four players considered to be the fastest in the Pacific Coast Hockey Association: Si Griffis, Ken Mallen, Fred "Cyclone" Taylor and Ernie "Moose" Johnson. Before the contest Griffis was confident regarding his chances of winning it all, due to his quick first steps, but in the final heat he was nonetheless beaten by Ken Mallen of the New Westminster Royals by a slim margin. In the semi-finals Griffis had finished in front of Moose Johnson, whereas Mallen in turn had defeated Cyclone Taylor.

Due to his strong skating, which he used to his advantage both as a rover and as a defenceman (cover-point), Griffis was a pioneering player in the art of carrying the puck up the ice from defence, instead of shooting or passing it up the ice to the forwards which had been the main practice during previous generations of players. Mike Jay, profiling Griffis in the December 30, 1913 issue of the Vancouver Daily World, also praised him for his endurance and recalled a game against the Montreal Wanderers in 1907 where Griffis had played through the contest with a broken nose, and where he was so badly cut up and used up that he could not remember anything from the game even six years afterwards.

== Career statistics ==
=== Regular season and playoffs ===
			Regular season					Playoffs
Season	Team	League	GP	G	A	Pts	PIM	GP	G	A	Pts	PIM
1901–02	Rat Portage Thistles	MNWHA	2	0	0	0	0	—	—	—	—	—
1902–03	Rat Portage Thistles	MNWHA	5	5	0	5	—	—	—	—	—	—
1902–03	Rat Portage Thistles	St-Cup	—	—	—	—	—	2	0	0	0	—
1903–04	Rat Portage Thistles	MNWHA	12	12	2	14	—	—	—	—	—	—
1904–05	Rat Portage Thistles	MHA	8	15	0	15	3	—	—	—	—	—
1904–05	Rat Portage Thistles	St-Cup	—	—	—	—	—	3	4	0	4	4
1905–06	Kenora Thistles	MHA	9	9	0	9	—	—	—	—	—	—
1906–07	Kenora Thistles	MPHL	6	5	0	5	—	—	—	—	—	—
1906–07	Kenora Thistles	St-Cup	—	—	—	—	—	6 (Note: Scorers for the 12 Kenora goals in the two-game series were not recorded.)	1	0	1	6
1911–12	Vancouver Millionaires	PCHA	15	8	0	8	18	—	—	—	—	—
1912–13	Vancouver Millionaires	PCHA	14	10	3	13	30	—	—	—	—	—
1913–14	Vancouver Millionaires	PCHA	13	2	3	5	21	—	—	—	—	—
1914–15	Vancouver Millionaires	PCHA	17	2	3	5	32	—	—	—	—	—
1915–16	Vancouver Millionaires	PCHA	18	7	5	12	12	—	—	—	—	—
1916–17	Vancouver Millionaires	PCHA	23	7	4	11	34	—	—	—	—	—
1917–18	Vancouver Millionaires	PCHA	8	2	6	8	0	2	0	0	0	0
1917–18	Vancouver Millionaires	St-Cup	—	—	—	—	—	5	1	0	1	9
1918–19	Vancouver Millionaires	PCHA	2	0	2	2	0	2	1	1	2	0
MHL/MPHL totals			23	29	0	29	—	—	—	—	—	—
PCHA totals			110	38	26	64	147	4	1	1	2	0
St-Cup totals			—	—	—	—	—	16	6	0	6	10
