= 1905–06 MHA season =

Ice hockey league season of play

The 1905–06 Manitoba Hockey Association (MHA) season was won by the Kenora Thistles, successfully defending their championship.

== Regular season ==
=== Final standing ===
Team	Games Played	Wins	Losses	Ties	Points
Kenora Thistles	8	7	1	0	14
Winnipeg Hockey Club	8	6	1	1*	13
Winnipeg Victorias	9	3	6	0	6
Brandon Wheat City Hockey Club	8	3	4	1*	6
Portage la Prairie Bisons	9	1	8	0	2

- A tie between Brandon and the Winnipeg Hockey Club was replayed. Winnipeg won the replay to tie Kenora for the league lead.

Source: Zweig, 2012.

== Playoff ==
Kenora defeated Winnipeg to take the league title. Kenora challenged for the Stanley Cup, however the challenge was not played until the following season.

== See also ==
- List of Stanley Cup champions

Preceded by 1904–05	MHA seasons 1905–06	Succeeded by 1906–07
