= Fred Hudson =

Canadian ice hockey manager

Frederick Albert Hudson (5 December, 1863 in Lyn, Ontario – 7 May, 1932 in Winnipeg, Manitoba) was the manager of the Kenora Thistles ice hockey team when they won the 1907 Stanley Cup championship. He was also their manager when they challenged for the Stanley Cup in 1905 (losing to Ottawa).
