= Russell Phillips (ice hockey) =

Canadian ice hockey player

Russell Frederick Phillips (September 17, 1888 in Rat Portage, Ontario – August 22, 1949 in Vancouver, British Columbia) was a Canadian ice hockey player. Russell was a member of the Stanley Cup 1907 champion Kenora Thistles. Russell was the younger brother of the Hockey Hall of Fame member Tommy Phillips.

== Career ==
He played four regular season games as a forward for the Thistles in 1906–07. However in January 1907, along with legendary defenseman "Bad" Joe Hall, Kenora defeated the Montreal Wanderers in a Stanley Cup Challenge game, while Phillips sat on sidelines as a spare. He was still included on the Stanley Cup winning picture, and the award gold plate cup. In 1907–08 he played one game for the Kenora Thistles. Later he played for the New Ontario Hockey League (NOHL)'s Fort William Forts.
