= Tommy Phillips =

Canadian ice hockey player (1883–1923)

- Hockey Hall of Fame, 1945
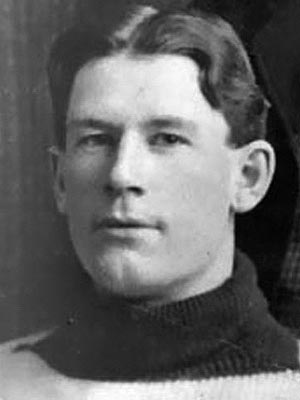
- Born: May 22, 1883 Rat Portage, Ontario, Canada
- Died: November 30, 1923 (aged 40) Toronto, Ontario, Canada
- Height: 5 ft 9 in (175 cm)
- Weight: 168 lb (76 kg; 12 st 0 lb)
- Position: Left wing
- Played for: Kenora Thistles; Ottawa Hockey Club; Vancouver Millionaires
- Playing career: 1900–1912

Thomas Neil Phillips (May 22, 1883 – November 30, 1923) was a Canadian professional ice hockey player. A left winger, like other players of his era Phillips played for several different teams and leagues. Most notable for his time with the Kenora Thistles, Phillips also played with the Montreal Hockey Club, the Ottawa Hockey Club, the Toronto Marlboros and the Vancouver Millionaires. Over the course of his career Phillips participated in six challenges for the Stanley Cup, the championship trophy of hockey, winning twice: with the Montreal Hockey Club in 1903 and with the Kenora Thistles, which he captained, in January 1907. Following his playing career, Phillips worked in the lumber industry until his death in 1923.

One of the best defensive forwards of his era, Phillips was also known for his all-around skill, particularly his strong shot and endurance, and was considered, alongside Frank McGee, one of the two best players in all of hockey. His younger brother, Russell, also played for the Thistles and was a member of the team when they won the Stanley Cup. When the Hockey Hall of Fame was founded in 1945, Phillips was one of the original nine inductees.

== Life and playing career ==
=== Early life ===
Phillips was born in Rat Portage, Ontario, on May 22, 1883, the youngest of three children, to James and Marcelline Phillips. James Phillips, who was born in Fifeshire, Scotland, on October 14, 1822, had trained as a stonemason and immigrated to Canada to help build railways. He had a son and two daughters from a previous marriage. On April 30, 1877, he married Marcelline (née Bourassa), a native of Buckingham, Quebec. Their first child, a son named Robert, was born in 1878, followed by a daughter, Margaret, in 1879; both were born in Ottawa. In 1882 James accepted a job in Western Ontario as superintendent of construction for the Canadian Pacific Railway transcontinental rail line, and the family moved to Rat Portage, near the Ontario border with Manitoba. Here a fourth child, Russell, was born in 1888. Russell would also play hockey, winning the Stanley Cup with Phillips in 1907.

As a young child Phillips learned to play hockey, and by 1895 he had joined the Rat Portage Thistles junior club, a team of players mostly aged 12 to 16. Phillips helped the team win the 1895–96 intermediate level championship of the Manitoba and Northwest Hockey Association. By 1899–1900 Phillips had joined the senior Thistles team, and would be named captain the following season, when they won the senior league championship. Phillips immediately earned praise for his endurance: in an era when players played the entire match and would often coast to conserve energy, Phillips could play at a fast pace the entire game, with a posthumous newspaper report stating that he "could play for an entire 60 [minutes] at full speed and be as fresh at the end as he was at the start." With a height of 5 ft 9 in (1.75 m) and weight of 168 pounds (76 kg) he was of average size for a hockey player of the era. His skill was already evident at the time, with the Rat Portage Miner praising him as one "of the best cover-points in the west, being a swift shot, a high lifter and a heavy check." A forward when he joined the senior Thistles, Phillips played cover-point for the 1900–01 season, before moving to left wing in 1901–02; he largely remained in that position for the rest of his career.

Regarded as one of the best players in Northwestern Ontario, Phillips moved east to Montreal in September 1902 to study electrical engineering at McGill University. He joined the university's hockey team, which had just moved to a new Canadian university league, and was immediately named captain. Phillips only played one match for McGill, on January 23, 1903, against Queen's University; McGill lost 7–0. Days after the game the Montreal Hockey Club asked Phillips to join them for their Stanley Cup challenge series against the Winnipeg Victorias. This required the approval of the other university clubs, which agreed on the condition that Phillips end his McGill career, which he did. Montreal won the series; Phillips finished third on the team in scoring with six goals in four games. Phillips also earned praise for his defensive play, particularly his ability to stop Tony Gingras, one of the top players on the Victorias.

Later in 1902 Phillips moved to Toronto to attend the Central Business School. He joined the Toronto Marlboros and, after changing positions to rover, was regarded as the team's best player. The Marlboros won both the Toronto city and the Ontario Hockey Association senior championships, and felt confident enough with Phillips on the roster to challenge the Ottawa Hockey Club for the Stanley Cup. The Marlboros lost the series; Phillips had the most assists, though also the most penalty minutes of any player in the series, with eight and fifteen, respectively. He was also regarded by Ottawa reporters to be by far the best player on the Marlboros, with one saying he was "much too fast a man for the company in which he is travelling."

=== Kenora and Ottawa ===
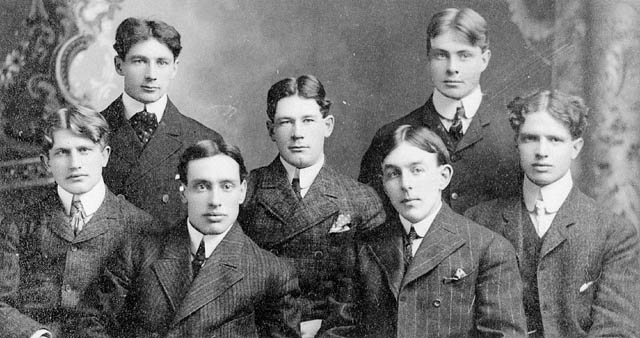
The Kenora Thistles posing for a photo in 1905–06. Phillips is in the middle of the photograph.

Phillips moved back to Rat Portage in 1904 when he learned his father was dying (James Phillips died in May 1904). Offered a job with a lumber company, and a C$1,000 bonus to play hockey for the Thistles, he stayed in the city, much to the disappointment of the Marlboros, who had wanted him to stay in Toronto. Rat Portage was amalgamated with neighbouring towns in 1905 and was renamed Kenora. Due to their proximity to Manitoba, the Thistles played in the Manitoba Hockey League. In the 1904–05 season Phillips had the second-most goals on the team and in the league, with twenty-six, two fewer than Billy McGimsie. The Thistles won the Manitoba league championship, allowing them to challenge for the Stanley, held at the time by the Ottawa Senators. By this time Phillips was regarded as one of the best players in Canada, equal to Frank McGee of the Senators. The Montreal Herald reported that "nine out of ten people will reply that either Frank McGee or Tom Phillips is" the best player in the country. In the first game of the challenge series against Ottawa, Phillips scored the first two goals, then added another three in the second half of the game as the Thistles won by a score of 9–3. Ottawa won the second game, 4–2, while Phillips was held pointless. In the third and deciding game of the series, Phillips scored a hat trick, including the first of the game, although Ottawa won the game 5–4 to retain the Cup.

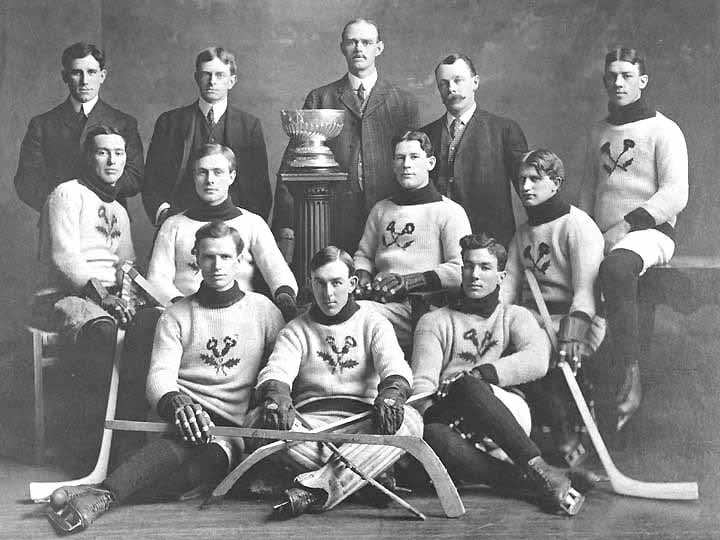
The Kenora Thistles posing for a photo with the Stanley Cup in 1907. Phillips is in the middle row, third from the left.

The Thistles won the Stirling Cup as champions of the Manitoba league in the 1905–06 season, which allowed them the right to challenge for the Cup again, since won by the Montreal Wanderers; Philipps tied with Billy Breen of the Winnipeg Hockey Club for the most goals with 24 each. There was an early spring that year, and with natural ice used at the time, the series had to wait until the following winter. In the 1906–07 season, Phillips led the league in goals, with eighteen. In the first game of the Thistles' successful two-game, total-goal Stanley Cup challenge against the Wanderers in January 1907, Phillips scored all four goals in the Thistles' 4–2 victory; he followed that up with three goals in the second game, an 8–6 victory, giving the Thistles a 12–6 win. A two-game rematch two months later saw the team lose; Phillips' nine goals, and sixteen penalty minutes led both categories.

Prior to the start of the 1907–08 season, he was offered between $1,500 and $1,800 to play for the Wanderers, but instead signed with the Ottawa Senators for a salary of $1,500. Phillips explained that he was ready to sign with the Wanderers, but the contract he received did not include everything promised. In signing with Ottawa, Philips rejoined Harry Westwick and Alf Smith, who had both joined the Thistles for their Stanley Cup defence in March 1907. It also likely made him the highest paid hockey player in Canada. He finished the season with twenty-six goals, two behind the scoring leaders, his teammate Marty Walsh and Russell Bowie of the Victorias.

=== Western Canada and later life ===
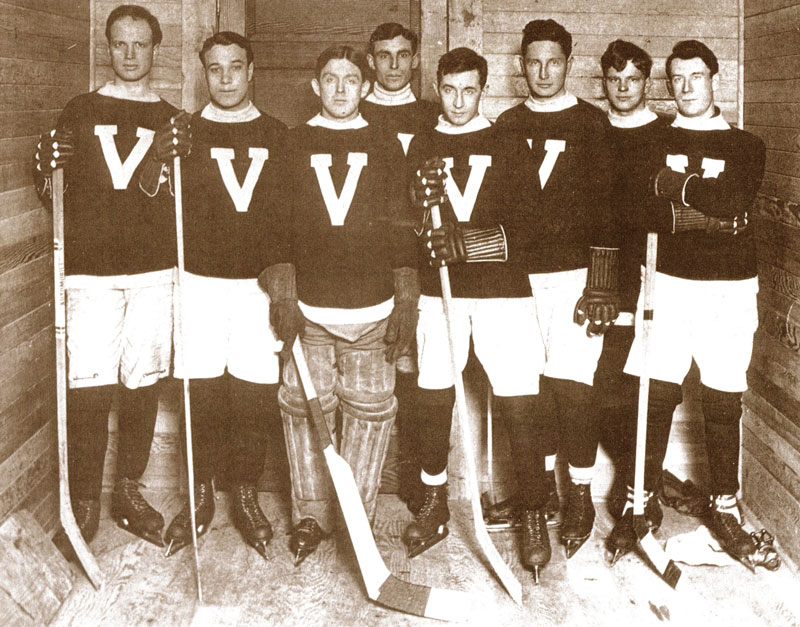
Phillips, at far right, with the 1911–12 Vancouver Millionaires.

Though offered a high salary to stay in Ottawa, reportedly up to $2000 for the season, Phillips decided to retire from hockey. He moved to Vancouver to take up a job in the lumber industry. However during the 1908–09 season he accepted an offer from Fred Whitcroft, a former teammate in Kenora who was now managing and playing for the Edmonton Hockey Club of the Alberta Amateur Hockey Association to join them for their upcoming Cup challenge. The team had signed several high-profile players from Eastern Canada to play for the team in the challenge; only two players on the team were from Edmonton, with the rest coming from the east. Phillips and Lester Patrick, an eastern-based player, never even reached Edmonton; they met their team in Winnipeg on its way east for the Cup challenge. Phillips, who was paid $600 for the two-game series, played in the first game against the Montreal Wanderers, which Edmonton lost 7–3, but broke his ankle and was forced to miss the second game, a 7–6 Edmonton win. Philipps returned Vancouver and his work in the lumber business after the series, eventually establishing his own company.

Over the summer Phillips was invited by Patrick to move to Nelson, British Columbia, where the latter was putting together a club of star players to challenge for the Cup. He played in 1909–10 with the local team, retiring after the season and taking a position as a manager of a lumber company in Vancouver. When Patrick and his brother Frank formed the Pacific Coast Hockey Association (PCHA) in 1911, Phillips was convinced to come out of retirement and join one of the teams in the new league, the Vancouver Millionaires. Phillips finished the 1912 season fourth on Vancouver in goals, and seventh overall in the league, with seventeen in fourteen games. Phillips, who realized that his skills had diminished, retired for a second time at the end of the season. A close friend of the Patricks, he remained close to the league, and occasionally officiated matches after his retirement.

After retiring from hockey Phillips ran his own lumber company Timms, Phillips and Company and later moved to Toronto in 1920. Phillips died of blood poisoning at the age of 40 in his residence at 19 Edgewood Crescent in Toronto, five days after having an ulcerated tooth removed. He had married Ella Gerturde Kilgour in Hamilton on January 4, 1911, and they had three children: Margery, Mary and James. Phillips was a member of Rosedale Community Church and a Freemason.

When the Hockey Hall of Fame was founded in 1945, Phillips was inducted as one of the first nine inductees. He was also inducted into the Northwestern Ontario Sports Hall of Fame in 1987.

== Career statistics ==
| | | | Regular season | | | | | Stanley Cup Challenge Games |
| Season | Team | League | GP | G | A | Pts | PIM | GP | G | A | Pts | PIM |
|---|---|---|---|---|---|---|---|---|---|---|---|---|
| 1899–1900 | Rat Portage Thistles | MNWHA | — | — | — | — | — | — | — | — | — | — |
| 1900–01 | Rat Portage Thistles | MNWHA | — | — | — | — | — | — | — | — | — | — |
| 1901–02 | Rat Portage Thistles | MNWHA | 9 | 7 | 0 | 7 | 7 | — | — | — | — | — |
| 1902–03 | McGill University Redmen | CIHU | 1 | 0 | 0 | 0 | — | — | — | — | — | — |
| 1902–03 | Montreal AAA | CAHL | 4 | 6 | 0 | 6 | — | 4 | 3 | 0 | 3 | — |
| 1903–04 | Toronto Marlboros | OHA | 4 | 5 | 0 | 5 | 21 | 4 | 7 | 8 | 15 | 15 |
| 1904–05 | Rat Portage Thistles | MHL | 8 | 26 | 0 | 26 | — | 3 | 8 | 0 | 8 | — |
| 1905–06 | Kenora Thistles | MHL | 9 | 24 | 0 | 24 | — | — | — | — | — | — |
| 1906–07 | Kenora Thistles | MHL | 6 | 18 | 0 | 18 | — | 6 | 13 | 0 | 13 | 25 |
| 1907–08 | Ottawa Hockey Club | ECAHA | 10 | 26 | 0 | 26 | 40 | — | — | — | — | — |
| 1908–09 | Edmonton Hockey Club | Exhib | 1 | 0 | 2 | 2 | 3 | 1 | 1 | 0 | 1 | 0 |
| 1909–10 | Nelson Hockey Club | WKHL | — | — | — | — | — | — | — | — | — | — |
| 1911–12 | Vancouver Millionaires | PCHA | 17 | 17 | 0 | 17 | 38 | — | — | — | — | — |
| CAHL totals | | | 4 | 6 | 0 | 6 | — | 4 | 3 | 0 | 3 | — |
| MHL totals | | | 23 | 68 | 0 | 68 | — | 9 | 21 | 0 | 21 | 25 |
| ECAHA totals | | | 10 | 26 | 0 | 26 | 40 | — | — | — | — | — |
| PCHA totals | | | 17 | 17 | 0 | 17 | 38 | — | — | — | — | — |
