= Tom Hooper (ice hockey) =

Canadian ice hockey player

- Hockey Hall of Fame, 1963
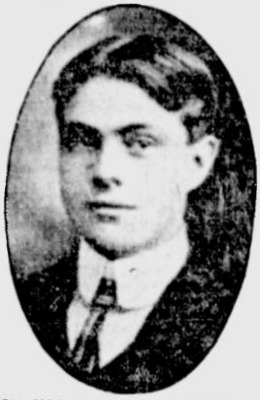
- Born: November 23, 1883 Kenora, Ontario, Canada
- Died: March 23, 1960 (aged 76) Vancouver, British Columbia, Canada
- Height: 5 ft 10 in (178 cm)
- Weight: 175 lb (79 kg; 12 st 7 lb)
- Position: Centre
- Shot: Right
- Played for: Montreal Hockey Club; Montreal Wanderers; Kenora Thistles
- Playing career: 1902–1908

Charles Thomas Hooper (November 24, 1883 – March 23, 1960) was a Canadian professional ice hockey player. He played for the Kenora Thistles, Montreal Hockey Club, and Montreal Wanderers. Hooper was a Stanley Cup winner with the Thistles in 1907 and the Wanderers in 1908. Noted for his skating speed, checking and stick-handling ability, he was inducted into the Hockey Hall of Fame in 1963.

== Playing career ==
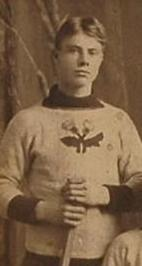
Hooper with the Rat Portage Thistles around 1900.

Hooper was born in the village of Rat Portage, later renamed Kenora, in north-western Ontario, Canada. He first played organized hockey for a local high school. The high school team was very talented, good enough to defeat Rat Portage's senior ice hockey team. In 1896, at the age of thirteen, Hooper joined the Rat Portage senior hockey team where he would play until 1908. During his years with the club, the Thistles won three league titles and challenged for the Stanley Cup three times, in 1903 and 1905 against Ottawa, and 1907 against the Montreal Wanderers. The team won the Cup in January 1907, in part due to Hooper's three goals in the second game of the two-game total-goals series. The team went on to defend the Stanley Cup as league champions but lost the title in March 1907 to the same Wanderers. Hooper missed the March series rematch due to a fractured collarbone.

The Thistles folded after one game in January 1908 and Hooper joined the Montreal Wanderers. He only played two season games with the Wanderers and two Stanley Cup challenge games before he got his release from the team. He had been moved to the cover-point defence position by the Wanderers from his career forward position and lost the starting job to Walter Smaill. He signed with the Montreal Hockey Club for the rest of the season, where he played rover. Hooper's play in the 1907–08 season was considered by hockey writers to not be up to the standard of his previous years due to his fitness. He retired after the season.

After hockey, Hooper moved to Vancouver, British Columbia. He died in 1960 and is buried in Mountain View Cemetery in Vancouver.

== Awards ==
- 1963 – Hockey Hall of Fame

== Career statistics ==
			Regular season					Playoffs
Season	Team	League	GP	G	A	Pts	PIM	GP	G	A	Pts	PIM
1899–1900	Rat Portage Thistles	MNWHA-Int	8	4	0	4	0	—	—	—	—	—
1900–01	Rat Portage Thistles	MNWHA-Int	11	7	0	7	3	—	—	—	—	—
1901–02	Rat Portage Thistles	MNWHA-Int	8	9	0	9	17	—	—	—	—	—
1902–03	Rat Portage Thistles	MNWHA-Snr	5	5	1	6	—	—	—	—	—	—
1902–03	Rat Portage Thistles	St-Cup	—	—	—	—	—	2	0	0	0	0
1903–04	Rat Portage Thistles	MNWHA-Snr	10	2	1	3	—	—	—	—	—	—
1904–05	Rat Portage Thistles	MHA	8	9	0	9	—	—	—	—	—	—
1904–05	Rat Portage Thistles	St-Cup	—	—	—	—	—	3	2	0	2	12
1905–06	Kenora Thistles	MHA	9	4	0	4	—	—	—	—	—	—
1906–07	Kenora Thistles	MPHL	3	4	0	4	—	2	0	0	0	11
1906–07	Kenora Thistles	St-Cup	—	—	—	—	—	3	3	0	3	0
1907–08	Kenora Thistles	MPHL	1	0	0	0	0	—	—	—	—	—
1907–08	Pembroke Lumber Kings	UOVHL	1	0	0	0	0	—	—	—	—	—
1907–08	Montreal HC	ECAHA	7	9	0	9	5	—	—	—	—	—
1907–08	Montreal Wanderers	ECAHA	2	1	0	1	0	—	—	—	—	—
1907–08	Montreal Wanderers	St-Cup	—	—	—	—	—	2	1	0	1	0
MHA/MPHL totals			21	17	0	17	—	—	—	—	—	—
St-Cup totals			—	—	—	—	—	10	5	0	5	15
