= Eddie Giroux =

Canadian ice hockey player

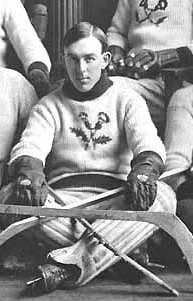
- Born: April 7, 1883 Toronto, Ontario, Canada
- Died: May 26, 1930 (aged 46) Winnipeg, Manitoba, Canada
- Position: Goaltender
- Played for: Toronto Marlboros (until 1904); Kenora Thistles (1904–1908)
- Playing career: 1902–1908

Edward Joseph Giroux (July 4, 1883 – May 26, 1930) was a Canadian professional ice hockey player best known for being the only 20-year-old to have competed in the 1904 Stanley Cup playoffs. Giroux played as a goaltender.

== Career ==
According to census data and Toronto street directories, Eddie Giroux was born and raised in Toronto. He grew up on Gould Street, near the Mutual Street rink. Giroux had been working since at least the age of 17 (he had a job feeding newsprint into the press at a Toronto trade paper), but he also played hockey. Giroux began his hockey career at a young age. He was a member of the Marlboros junior team that reached the OHA finals in 1902–03, and also of the intermediate team that won the provincial championship that year. He first appeared in the Stanley Cup playoffs in February 1904, at the age of 20, while playing for the OHA senior champion Toronto Marlboros. Toronto played against the Ottawa Silver Seven, who beat Toronto in the first game 6–3 and 11–2 in the second game (best-of-three format).

A Toronto Star story on September 13, 1904, notes that Giroux had taken up residence in Rat Portage (later Kenora), Ontario the hometown of his Marlboros teammate Tommy Phillips who had returned home that May. Giroux and Phillips played with the Kenora Thistles in 1905. Kenora played for the Stanley Cup, but lost two games to one to Ottawa.

In January 1907 Kenora again played for the Stanley Cup, and with Giroux in net, Kenora defeated the Montreal Wanderers 12–8 over two games to win. Each player received a gold-plated cup for winning the Stanley Cup. Giroux was in net when Kenora defeated Brandon on March 16 and 18, to win the Manitoba Championship and retained the Stanley Cup. However, about a week later the Montreal Wanderers regained the Stanley Cup from Kenora in two games in Winnipeg.

Because Kenora was unable to compete with other professional teams, it folded in 1908, and Giroux retired as a player. When Kenora challenged the Winnipeg Victorias for the Allan Cup in March 1911, Giroux officiated along with long-time friend Tommy Phillips. Winnipeg won the Allan Cup, out scoring Kenora 12–5.
