= Billy McGimsie =

Canadian ice hockey player (1880–1968)

- Hockey Hall of Fame, 1963
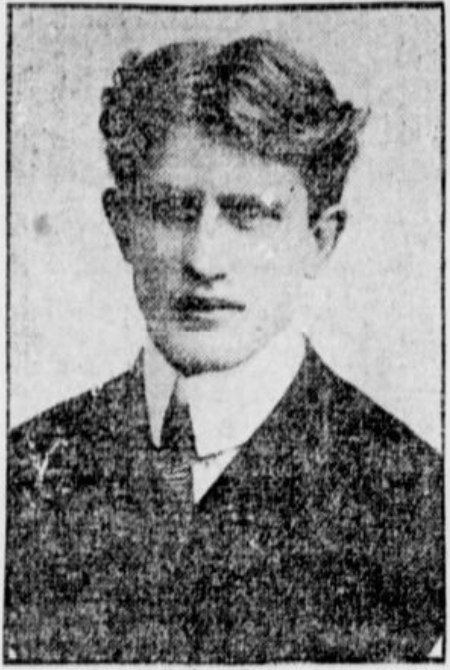
- Born: June 7, 1880 Woodville, Ontario, Canada
- Died: October 28, 1968 (aged 88) Calgary, Alberta, Canada
- Height: 5 ft 8 in (173 cm)
- Weight: 145 lb (66 kg; 10 st 5 lb)
- Position: Centre
- Played for: Kenora Thistles
- Playing career: 1901–1907

William George McGimsie (June 7, 1880 – October 28, 1968) was a Canadian amateur ice hockey player. He played six seasons as a centre for the Rat Portage/Kenora Thistles between 1901 and 1907. A leading offensive player of his era, McGimsie led the Manitoba and North West Hockey League with 28 goals in 8 games in 1904–05. He was a member of three Thistles' teams that challenged for the Stanley Cup, winning the national championship in 1907. His career was ended when he suffered a separated shoulder in an exhibition game. McGimsie was inducted into the Hockey Hall of Fame in 1963.

== Early life ==
McGimsie was born on June 7, 1880 in Woodville, Ontario, the second of three children to Samuel and Susan McGimsie. He had an older sister, Jeanette and younger brother, Charlie. Samuel was originally a carpenter, and the nature of his work saw the family move frequently. In 1882 or 1883 the family moved to Rat Portage, Ontario as he took up a job with the Canadian Pacific Railway. There McGimsie became interested in hockey at an early age; his first pair of skates were stolen from his sister. They were of a style designed to clamp onto his normal shoes, and he wore them for several years as his family could not afford a newer pair.

The establishment of the Stanley Cup as Canada's national hockey championship in 1893 inspired McGimsie, who dedicated his early life to winning it. He played in school, church and mercantile leagues as a youth. His brother Charlie was also a player, and McGimsie played his youth hockey with future Hockey Hall of Famers Si Griffis, Tommy Phillips and Tom Hooper.

== Playing career ==
Following his youth career, McGimsie joined the Rat Portage Thistles' intermediate team where he scored eight goals in four games in 1901–02. Turning his focus exclusively to hockey, McGimsie quit school and paid a $2 fee to join the Thistles' senior team for the following season. He scored ten goals in four regular season games to help the Thistles win the Manitoba and North West Hockey Association (MNWHA) championship. The team then challenged the Ottawa Silver Seven for control of the Stanley Cup. The Thistles were outmatched by Ottawa in the two-game, total-goals series, losing by 6–2 and 4–2 scores. McGimsie scored three of his team's four goals.

A 14-goal season in 1903–04 gave way to 28 goals, in 8 games, for McGimsie in 1904–05. He led the Manitoba Hockey League (MHL) in scoring that season and led the team to a second league championship. The Thistles again challenged the Silver Seven for the Stanley Cup. This series was held as a best-of-three games. Led by Tommy Phillips' five goals, Rat Portage won the first game by a 9–3 score against an Ottawa team that was missing its star, Frank McGee. The return of McGee for the final two games sparked the Silver Seven, who won both games, 4–2 and 5–4, to retain the Stanley Cup.

McGimsie finished third in MHL scoring with 21 goals in 1905–06 for the Kenora Thistles, whose name changed along with that their town. The team defeated the Winnipeg Hockey Club in a single game playoff, 8–2, to win the Manitoba championship, but made no challenge for the Stanley Cup that season. The challenge failed to materialize as the Stanley Cup's trustees felt it was too late in the season for a series. Instead, they mandated that the Montreal Wanderers, who won the Cup from Ottawa, would face the Thistles in a two-game series for the trophy midway through the 1906–07 season. The Thistles won the first game by a 4–2 score. In the second game, played January 21, 1907, McGimsie scored one of Kenora's eight goals as the Thistles took the second match 8–6 and won the Stanley Cup by a combined score of 12–8. With a population of around 4,000, Kenora became the smallest town to ever win the Stanley Cup.

On their return to Kenora, the Thistles stopped in Ottawa and Toronto to play exhibition games. In the January 23 game at Ottawa, McGimsie was knocked out of the game with an injury that was not initially considered serious, described as a "badly bruised and slightly dislocated shoulder". He played in the Thistles' next exhibition in Toronto on January 25, but the injury ended McGimsie's career. He and his teammates were feted when they returned to Kenora, and McGimsie accepted a $2,000 reward from the team for winning the championship. He briefly coached in Fort William, Ontario, serving behind the bench for one season in 1910–11, and was inducted into the Hockey Hall of Fame in 1963.

== Off the ice ==
McGimsie became a jeweller, an occupation that led to his moving frequently across western Canada until his daughter convinced him to settle in Calgary, Alberta.

== Career statistics ==
=== Regular season and playoffs ===
			Regular season					Playoffs
Season	Team	League	GP	G	A	Pts	PIM	GP	G	A	Pts	PIM
1901–02	Rat Portage Thistles	MNWHA-Int	4	8	0	8	0	—	—	—	—	—
1902–03	Rat Portage Thistles	MNWHA	4	10	0	10	—	2	3	0	3	—
1903–04	Rat Portage Thistles	MNWHA	11	14	2	16	—	—	—	—	—	—
1904–05	Rat Portage Thistles	MHL	8	28	0	28	3	3	0	0	0	—
1905–06	Kenora Thistles	MHL	9	21	0	21	—	—	—	—	—	—
1906–07	Kenora Thistles	MHL	2	2	0	2	—	2	1	0	1	8
Senior totals			38	83	2	85	3	7	4	0	4	8
