= Brandon Wheat City Hockey Club =

Ice hockey team

The Wheat City Hockey Club (also known as Brandon Wheat Cities) was an early amateur ice hockey club in Brandon, Manitoba. The club fielded senior-level, junior and intermediate teams from 1898. The club fielded teams in the Manitoba & Northwestern Hockey Association, followed by the Manitoba Hockey Association, the Manitoba Professional Hockey League (MPHL) and the early Manitoba Hockey League.

== History ==
The club was founded as the Brandon Hockey Club in 1898. The club first fielded teams in the intermediate division of the Manitoba & Northwestern Hockey Association. In 1902, the club started fielding teams in the senior division. In 1904, the senior team made its first challenge for the Stanley Cup, in 1904 against the Ottawa Hockey Club (the Silver Seven). In 1906, the club fielded its first professional senior team, which challenged for the Stanley Cup in 1907 in the MPHL playoff against the Kenora Thistles. The professional league folded after a few seasons, but the Wheat City club continued fielding senior-level amateur teams until 1935.

Canadian Amateur Hockey Association (CAHA) president H. J. Sterling chose Winnipeg as the host location for the 1921 finals at an arena with an artificial ice surface. The Manitoba Amateur Hockey Association (MAHA) and the Brandon Wheat City Hockey Club wanted to have the games played at the rink in Brandon, and contested that Sterling was incorrect to make the decision himself without consulting the CAHA executive. They sought an injunction against Sterling to prevent the games from being played in Winnipeg, but were denied when the justice declined to interfere in CAHA business. The Toronto Varsity Blues men's ice hockey defeated the Brandon Wheat City Hockey Club in the finals for the 1921 Allan Cup.

When five players from the team suddenly departed after the 1920–21 season ended, MAHA secretary Fred Marples stated that it put the players under suspicion of professionalism, but the MAHA could not do anything unless there was proof of players being paid to play or a residency rule violation. In June 1921, Marples and other MAHA officials met with CAHA president W. R. Granger to investigate into charges of professionalism in amateur hockey. The CAHA subsequently established a national registrar and a committee to investigate registrations.

== Notable players ==
- Ty Arbour – professional ice hockey player in the NHL
- Lorne Chabot – professional ice hockey goaltender in the NHL
- Fred Gordon – professional ice hockey player in the NHL
- Joe Hall (1898–1905,1906–1907) – Hockey Hall of Fame player, two-time Stanley Cup champion
- Walter Mummery – member of Quebec professional ice hockey team in the NHA
- Lester Patrick (1903–1904) – Hockey Hall of Fame player, later New York Rangers general manager
- Art Ross (1905–1907) – Hockey Hall of Fame player, later Boston Bruins general manager

== See also ==
- 1903–04 Ottawa Hockey Club season
- 1906–07 MPHL season
