= 1907–08 ECAHA season =

Ice hockey season

- League: Eastern Canada Amateur Hockey Association
- Sport: Ice hockey
- Duration: December 29, 1907 – March 7, 1908
- Teams: 6

1907–08
- Champions: Montreal Wanderers
- Top scorer: Russell Bowie (31 goals)

ECAHA seasons
- ← 1907 1909 →

The 1907–08 ECAHA season was the third season of the Eastern Canada Amateur Hockey Association (ECAHA). Teams played a ten-game schedule. The Montreal Wanderers would win the league championship with a record of eight wins, two losses.

== League business ==
=== Executive ===
- Dr. George Cameron, Montreal (President)
- Joe Power, Quebec (1st Vice-President)
- Patrick J. Baskerville, Ottawa (2nd Vice-President)
- W. P. Lunny, Shamrocks (Secretary-Treasurer)

The Nationals applied for a franchise but did not get three-fourths approval.

Mr. Baskerville demanded better protection be given visiting teams at Quebec, as stones had been thrown at the Senators on their last visit.

=== Rule Changes ===
- Teams could now openly pay players. Players would have to declare their professional or amateur status. The Victorias would remain strictly amateur.

== Hod Stuart Benefit All-Star Game ==
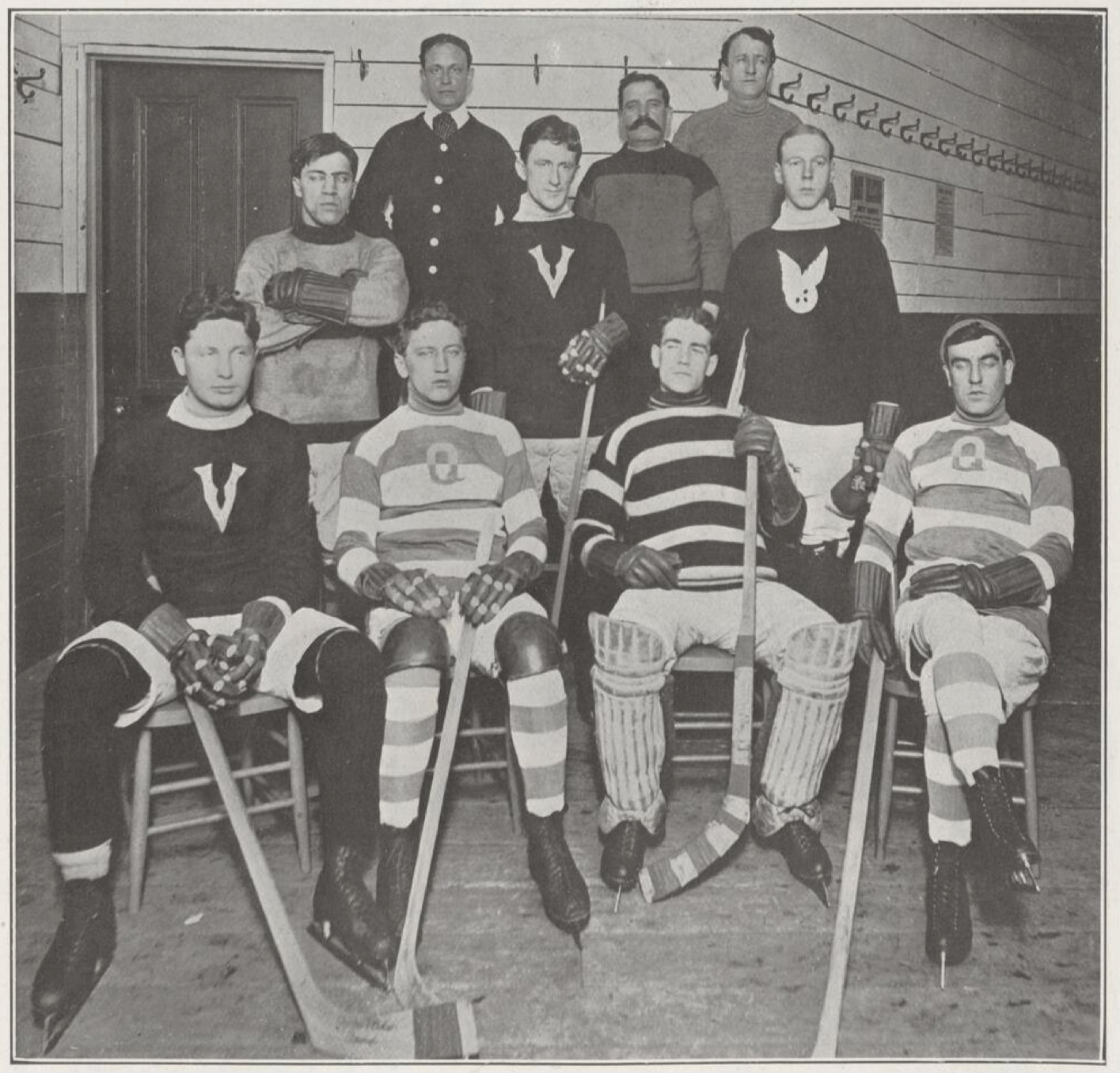
ECAHA All-Stars.

The first All-Star game in ice hockey was played on January 2, 1908, before 3,500 fans at the Montreal Arena between the Montreal Wanderers (defending Stanley Cup champions) and a team of all-star players from the remaining teams in the league. It was held in memory of Montreal Wanderers player Hod Stuart, who had died in a diving accident three months after the Wanderers won the Stanley Cup in 1907. The sale of tickets, from 25 cents to $1, raised $2,000 for Mr. Stuart's widow and two children.

Wanderers (10) All-Stars (7)
Riley Hern	Goal	Percy LeSueur (Ottawa)
Art Ross	Point	Rod Kennedy (Victorias)
Walter Smaill	Cover-point	Frank Patrick, (Victorias)
Frank Glass	Rover	Joe Power (Quebec)
Ernie Russell	Centre	Grover Sargent (Montreal)
Cecil Blachford	Right wing	Ed Hogan (Quebec)
Ernie Johnson	left wing	Jack Marshall (Shamrocks)

== Regular season ==
Russell Bowie of Victorias led the scoring championship with 31 goals. This was the fifth time in ten seasons that Bowie would lead the scorers.

There was a large amount of player turnover. For the Wanderers, Hod Stuart of Wanderers had died in the off-season, Lester Patrick had moved west, and new players would include Art Ross from Brandon, Tom Hooper of Kenora and Ernie Russell formerly of Montreal HC.

Ottawa lost Harry Smith and Hamby Shore who moved to Winnipeg and Billy Gilmour who joined the Victorias. Ottawa added Cyclone Taylor from Portage Lakes, Tommy Phillips from Kenora, and Marty Walsh from the Canadian Soo.

Montreal Shamrocks signed up Didier Pitre and Jack Laviolette from the International League.

Quebec Bulldogs had three Power brothers in the lineup: Joe, Charles aka 'Chubby' and James aka 'Rocket'.

Montreal Victorias signed Frank Patrick of McGill and Billy Gilmour.

On January 28, the Wanderers played Renfrew Creamery Kings of the Federal League in Brockville, Ontario, for a bet of CA$400, (The Wanderers' expenses were provided). Wanderers played without three of their players from winning the Stanley Cup (Blatchford, Glass and Smail) and lost 11–5 to Renfrew.

=== Highlights ===
Ottawa opened their new Arena, hosting the Wanderers on January 11, 1908, overloading capacity with 7,100 attending. Ottawa defeated the Wanderers 12–2. Ottawa and Wanderers were tied for first going into their rematch on February 29, when the Ottawa manager J. P. Dickson resigned in a dispute over which train to take to Montreal. At the time, two trains were available for the trip, and the two would race, with betting taking place on the winner. In the actual game, the two defence stars Art Ross and Cyclone Taylor would lead end-to-end rushes, and the game would be tied until Taylor was injured, and Bruce Stuart and Walter Smaill would score for the Wanderers to win 4–2.

On January 18, Quebec would defeat Montreal 18–5, with Chubby Power scoring six.

Russell Bowie would score five in a game three times, Marty Walsh would have the biggest game, scoring seven, and six in another. Tom Phillips would score five twice, Herb Jordan would score six and five, and Jack Marshall would score five twice.

=== Final standing ===
Note GP = Games Played, W = Wins, L = Losses, T = Ties, GF = Goals For, GA = Goals Against

Team	GP	W	L	T	GF	GA
Montreal Wanderers	10	8	2	0	63	52
Ottawa Hockey Club	10	7	3	0	86	51
Quebec Hockey Club	10	5	5	0	81	74
Montreal Shamrocks	10	5	5	0	53	49
Montreal Victorias	10	4	6	0	73	78
Montreal Hockey Club	10	1	9	0	53	105

=== Results ===
Month	Day	Visitor	Score	Home	Score
1907
Dec.	29	Shamrocks	10	Montreal HC	4
1908
Jan.	4	Ottawa HC	1	Quebec HC	8
Jan.	4	Victorias	8	Shamrocks	6
Jan.	8	Wanderers	7	Montreal HC	3
Jan.	11	Wanderers	2	Ottawa HC	12
Jan.	11	Quebec HC	6	Victorias	12
Jan.	15	Victorias	5	Wanderers	7
Jan.	18	Ottawa HC	3	Shamrocks	4 (OT 2')
Jan.	18	Montreal HC	5	Quebec HC	18
Jan.	22	Shamrocks	1	Wanderers	3
Jan.	25	Victorias	9	Ottawa HC	14
Jan.	25	Quebec HC	8	Wanderers	13
Jan.	29	Victorias	13	Montreal HC	7
Feb.	1	Ottawa HC	14	Montreal HC	7
Feb.	5	Wanderers	5	Victorias	6 (OT 10')
Feb.	8	Quebec HC	5	Ottawa HC	11
Feb.	8	Montreal HC	3	Shamrocks	9
Feb.	12	Victorias	4	Shamrocks	7
Feb.	13	Shamrocks	3	Quebec HC	7
Feb.	15	Ottawa HC	10	Victorias	4
Feb.	15	Wanderers	8	Quebec HC	6
Feb.	19	Montreal HC	5	Wanderers	8
Feb.	22	Shamrocks	2	Ottawa HC	5
Feb.	22	Quebec HC	8	Montreal HC	6
Feb.	26	Montreal HC	7	Victorias	4
Feb.	29	Ottawa HC	2	Wanderers	4
Feb.	29	Victorias	8	Quebec HC	9 (OT 3')
Mar.	4	Wanderers	6	Shamrocks	4
Mar.	7	Ottawa HC	14	Montreal HC	6
Mar.	7	Quebec HC	6	Shamrocks	7

== Player statistics ==
=== Scoring leaders ===
Note: GP = Games played, G = Goals scored

Name	Club	GP	G
Russell Bowie	Victorias	10	31
Marty Walsh	Ottawa	9	28
Tommy Phillips	Ottawa	10	26
Charles Power	Quebec	10	23
Herb Jordan	Quebec	8	22
Ernie Russell	Wanderers	9	21
Jack Marshall	Shamrocks	9	19
Joe Eveleigh	Montreal	8	16
Joe Power	Quebec	10	13
Alf Smith	Ottawa	9	13

=== Goaltending averages ===
Note: GP = Games played, GA = Goals against, SO = Shutouts, GAA = Goals against average

Name	Club	GP	GA	SO	GAA
Billy Nicholson	Shamrocks	10	49		4.9
Percy LeSueur	Ottawa	10	51		5.1
Riley Hern	Wanderers	10	52		5.2
Nathan Frye	Victorias	1	7		7.0
Paddy Moran	Quebec	10	74		7.4
Wyn Robinson	Victorias	9	71		7.9
Chuck Tyner	Montreal	1	9		9.0
Dave Finnie	Montreal	5	48		9.6
Archie Lockerby	Montreal	4	48		12.0

== Stanley Cup challenges ==
Wanderers played in three challenges, during the season against Ottawa Victorias and after the season, against Winnipeg and Toronto. All games were played at the Montreal Arena.

=== Wanderers vs. Ottawa ===
During the season, Wanderers would play a challenge against the Ottawa Victorias of the Federal Amateur Hockey League. On January 9–13, the Wanderers would win 9–3, 13–1 (22–4). Eddie Roberts broke his collarbone in the first game and was replaced by Gerard. Only 500 attended the second game.

January 9
Victorias	3		Wanderers	9
Billy Hague		G	William "Riley" Hern	
Charles Ross		P	Art Ross	2
Melford Milne		CP	Tom Hooper	
Ed Roberts	1	RO	Frank "Pud" Glass	3
Alf Young		C	Ernie Russell	4
Bob Harrison	1	RW	Walter Smaill	
Jack Fraser	1	LW	Ernie "Moose" Johnson	
Referees – James Power & D. Brown

January 13
Victorias	1		Wanderers	13
Billy Hague		G	William "Riley" Hern	
Charles Ross		P	Art Ross	1
Jack Ryan		CP	Tom Hooper	
Eddie Gerard		RO	Frank "Pud" Glass	1
Harry Manson	1	C	Ernie Russell	6
Bob Harrison		RW	Cecil Blachford	1
Jack Fraser		LW	Ernie "Moose" Johnson	4
Referees – James Power & D. Brown

=== Wanderers vs. Winnipeg ===
Wanderers defeated Winnipeg Maple Leafs in a two-game series 11–5, 9–3 (20–8) March 10–12.

March 10
Maple Leafs	5		Wanderers	11
Jack Winchester		G	William "Riley" Hern	
Joe "Grindy" Forrester		P	Art Ross	1
Barney Holden (Capt.)		CP	Walter Smaill	2
Hamilton Hamby Shore		F	Frank "Pud" Glass	1
Lorne Campbell		F	Bruce Stuart	2
Harry Kennedy	4	F	Cecil Blachford Capt.	3
Fred Lake	1	F	Ernie "Moose" Johnson	2
Referees – James Power & Kirby

March 12
Maple Leafs	3		Wanderers	9
Jack Winchester		G	William "Riley" Hern	
Joe "Grindy" Forrester		P	Art Ross	
Barney Holden Capt.		CP	Walter Smaill	1
Hamilton Hamby Shore	2	F	Frank "Pud" Glass	
Lorne Campbell		F	Bruce Stuart	4
Harry Kennedy		F	Cecil Blachford Capt.	
Fred Lake	1	F	Ernie "Moose" Johnson	4
Referees – Kirby & Henry

=== Wanderers vs. Toronto ===
The Wanderers then took on Toronto of the Ontario Professional Hockey League in a challenge. The Wanderers defeated Toronto 6–4 on March 14 on two late goals by Ernie Johnson and Bruce Stuart.

March 14
Toronto	4		Wanderers	6
Chuck Tyner		G	William "Riley" Hern	
Con Corbeau		P	Art Ross	
Rowley Young	1	CP	Walter Smaill	
Bert Morrison		F	Frank "Pud" Glass	2
Edouard Newsy Lalonde	2	F	Ernie Russell	1
Bruce Ridpath* Capt.	1	F	Cecil Blachford Capt.	1
Wally Mercer		F	Ernie "Moose" Johnson	1
Jack Marks		sub	Bruce Start	1
Referees – Frank Patrick & Russell Bowie

* Bruce Ridpath was Playing-Coach-Captain of 1908 Toronto Professionals

Source: Coleman

== Stanley Cup engraving ==
The 1908 Stanley Cup was presented by the trophy's trustee William Foran. The Wanderers never did engrave their names on the Cup for their championship season.

The following Wanderers players and staff were members of the winning team.

1908 Montreal Wanderers
Players
Centres
Frank "Pud" Glass (center-rover)
Ernie Liffiton (center-right wing)
Bruce Stuart (rover)
Walter Smaill (rover)
Harry Smith (rover) † ₳
Wingers
Ernie "Moose" Johnson (left wing)
Larry Gilmour^ (left wing-center)
Ernie Russell (right wing-center)
Jimmy Gardner † ₳ (right wing)
Defencemen
Art Ross (point)
Billy Strachan (point)
Tom Hooper ‡ ₳ (cover point & centre)
Cecil Blachford (Captain - cover point)
Goaltender
William "Riley" Hern

† Jimmy Gardner and Harry Smith were not members of Montreal Wanderers during their January and March 1908 Stanley Cup defences. However, they played in Dec 1908 when the Wanderers defeated Edmonton.

†† unknown first name.

‡ Tom Hooper left the Wanderers after the challenge game of January 13.

₳ Team picture included 4 players who did not play for Montreal 1908, but did win cups with the Wanderers – Hod Stuart 1906–07, Rod Kennedy 1906–07, Lester Patrick 1906–07, Jack Marshal 1907. 4 Players who won the Stanley Cup with the Wanderers in 1908 are missing from the team picture – Larry Gilmour ₳, Tom Hooper ₳, Jimmy Gardner ₳, Harry Smith ₳.

non-players =

- James Strachan (President), Clarence McKerrow (hon. president)
- Dickie Boon (manager), George Guile (secretary/treasurer)
- Tom Hodges (hon. secretary/treasurer), William Jennings (vice-president)
- Robert "Bob" Stephanson (Vice President), Robert "Bob" Ahern (hon. vice-president)
- George Hodges, Bert Strachan, Filbert Strachan, H. Watson†† (directors)
- Walter Dorion (club doctor), Paul Lefebvre (trainer)

engraving-notes =

- After engraving 20 members' names in the bowl of the Stanley Cup in 1907, Wanderers did not even bother including their team name on the Stanley Cup in 1908. It was not until the trophy was redesigned in 1948 that the words "1908 Montreal Wanderers" were put onto its then-new collar.

== See also ==
- Eastern Canadian Amateur Hockey Association
- List of pre-NHL seasons
- List of ice hockey leagues

Preceded by Montreal Wanderers; March 1907	Montreal Wanderers; Stanley Cup Champions; 1908	Succeeded by Ottawa HC; 1909
Preceded by 1907 ECAHA season	ECAHA seasons 1907–08	Succeeded by 1909 ECHA season
