= 1906 ECAHA season =

- League: Eastern Canada Amateur Hockey Association
- Sport: Ice hockey
- Duration: January 3 – March 10, 1906
- Teams: 6

1906
- Champions: Montreal Wanderers
- Top scorer: Harry Smith (31 goals)

ECAHA seasons
- ← 1905 (CAHL) 1907 →

The 1906 ECAHA season was the inaugural season of the Eastern Canada Amateur Hockey Association (ECAHA). Six teams played a 10-game schedule. The Ottawa HC and Montreal Wanderers tied for the league championship with a record of 9–1, while the Montreal Shamrocks failed to win a single game. The Senators and the Wanderers then played a two-game playoff for the league championship and the Stanley Cup, and the Wanderers won 9–1, 3–9 (12–10) on goals.

== League business ==
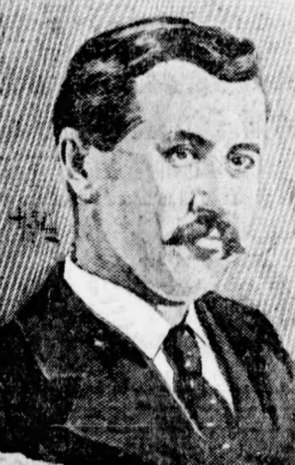
League executive Howard Wilson

=== Executive ===
Initial:

- Howard Wilson, Montreal (President)
- George P. Murphy, Ottawa (1st Vice-President)
- Dr. Cameron (2nd Vice-President)
- James Strachan, Wanderers (Secretary-Treasurer)

After December 20:

- Howard Wilson, Montreal (President)
- William Northey, Montreal Arena Corp. (Secretary-Treasurer)

=== Rule Changes ===
- Teams must appoint game timers for each game,
- a two referee system was adopted,
- new Arena Trophy would be awarded to the regular season winner,
- three-quarters vote would be needed to admit new teams,
- if a team resigns, all of its played games would be considered cancelled,
- $25 fine for delay of start of game, and
- $50 charge to make a protest, non-refundable.

== Regular season ==
The Ottawas played two Cup challenges during the regular season, defeating Queen's College of Kingston, the OHA champion, and defeating Smiths Falls, the FAHL champion.

=== Highlights ===
This season saw many new players. Wanderers brought in Lester Patrick, Ernie Johnson and Ernie Russell and Ottawa brought in Harry and Tommy Smith.

Fred Brophy, of Montreal HC, repeated his goal-scoring performance from the goaltender position in a game against Montreal Victorias on March 7.

Again, the league was high scoring, with Harry Smith scoring 31 goals in 8 games, Russell Bowie scoring 30 goals in 9 games, and Frank McGee scoring 28 goals in 7 games. Mr. Smith scored 6 in one game, 5 in another, topped by 8 against the Shamrocks on February 17. Mr. McGee would equal the 8 goals in a game feat against Montreal HC on March 3. Seven players scored at least 5 goals in a single game.

=== Final standing ===
Playoff qualifiers in bold.

Note GP = Games Played, W = Wins, L = Losses, T = Ties, GF = Goals For, GA = Goals Against

| Team | GP | W | L | T | GF | GA |
|---|---|---|---|---|---|---|
| **Ottawa Hockey Club** | 10 | 9 | 1 | 0 | 90 | 42 |
| **Montreal Wanderers** | 10 | 9 | 1 | 0 | 74 | 38 |
| Montreal Victorias | 10 | 6 | 4 | 0 | 76 | 73 |
| Quebec Hockey Club | 10 | 3 | 7 | 0 | 57 | 70 |
| Montreal Hockey Club | 10 | 3 | 7 | 0 | 49 | 63 |
| Montreal Shamrocks | 10 | 0 | 10 | 0 | 30 | 90 |

=== Results ===
| Month | Day | Visitor | Score | Home | Score |
|---|---|---|---|---|---|
| Jan. | 3 | **Montreal HC** | 9 | Shamrocks | 3 |
| Jan. | 6 | Quebec HC | 3 | **Ottawa HC** | 6 |
| Jan. | 6 | **Wanderers** | 11 | Victorias | 5 |
| Jan. | 10 | **Victorias** | 9 | Shamrocks | 7 |
| Jan. | 13 | Quebec HC | 10 | **Victorias** | 11 (OT) |
| Jan. | 13 | Wanderers | 4 | **Ottawa HC** | 8 |
| Jan. | 17 | Shamrocks | 2 | **Wanderers** | 3 (OT) |
| Jan. | 20 | **Wanderers** | 6 | Quebec HC | 5 |
| Jan. | 20 | **Ottawa HC** | 4 | Montreal HC | 1 |
| Jan. | 24 | **Victorias** | 11 | Shamrocks | 2 |
| Jan. | 27 | **Quebec HC** | 3 | Shamrocks | 1 |
| Jan. | 27 | Victorias | 6 | **Ottawa HC** | 11 |
| Jan. | 31 | **Wanderers** | 6 | Montreal HC | 2 |
| Feb. | 3 | **Victorias** | 6 | Quebec HC | 2 |
| Feb. | 3 | Ottawa HC | 3 | **Wanderers** | 5 |
| Feb. | 7 | **Montreal HC** | 4 | Shamrocks | 1 |
| Feb. | 10 | Shamrocks | 8 | **Quebec HC** | 14 |
| Feb. | 10 | **Ottawa HC** | 10 | Victorias | 4 |
| Feb. | 14 | **Wanderers** | 6 | Montreal HC | 2 |
| Feb. | 17 | Shamrocks | 2 | **Ottawa HC** | 13 |
| Feb. | 17 | **Quebec HC** | 7 | Montreal HC | 6 (OT 15'20") |
| Feb. | 21 | **Wanderers** | 9 | Victorias | 4 |
| Feb. | 25 | **Ottawa HC** | 9 | Shamrocks | 3 |
| Feb. | 25 | **Montreal HC** | 5 | Quebec HC | 2 |
| Feb. | 28 | **Victorias** | 6 | Montreal HC | 5 |
| Mar. | 3 | Montreal HC | 9 | **Ottawa HC** | 14 |
| Mar. | 3 | Quebec HC | 6 | **Wanderers** | 9 |
| Mar. | 7 | Montreal HC | 6 | **Victorias** | 14 |
| Mar. | 10 | **Ottawa HC** | 12 | Quebec HC | 5 |
| Mar. | 10 | **Wanderers** | 15 | Shamrocks | 1 |

== Player statistics ==
=== Scoring leaders ===
Note: GP = Games played, G = Goals scored

| Name | Club | GP | G |
|---|---|---|---|
| Harry Smith | Ottawa HC | 8 | 31 |
| Russell Bowie | Victorias | 9 | 30 |
| Frank McGee | Ottawa HC | 7 | 28 |
| Joe Power | Quebec HC | 10 | 21 |
| Ernie Russell | Wanderers | 6 | 21 |
| Walter Smaill | Montreal HC | 10 | 17 |
| Lester Patrick | Wanderers | 9 | 17 |
| Herb Jordan | Quebec HC | 8 | 16 |
| Alf Smith | Ottawa HC | 10 | 13 |
| Ernie Johnson | Montreal HC | 10 | 12 |

=== Goaltending averages ===
Note: GP = Games played, GA = Goals against, SO = Shutouts, GAA = Goals against average

| Name | Club | GP | GA | SO | GAA |
|---|---|---|---|---|---|
| Henri Menard | Wanderers | 10 | 38 | | 3.8 |
| Billy Hague | Ottawa HC | 10 | 42 | | 4.2 |
| Fred Brophy | Montreal HC | 10 | 63 | | 6.3 |
| Nathan Frye | Victorias | 8 | 52 | | 6.5 |
| Paddy Moran | Quebec HC | 10 | 70 | | 7.0 |
| Mike Kenny | Shamrocks | 8 | 64 | | 8.0 |
| Oliver Waugh | Victorias | 2 | 21 | | 10.5 |
| Jack Brennan | Shamrocks | 2 | 26 | | 13.0 |

== Playoffs ==
=== Stanley Cup challenges ===
The Ottawas played two Cup challenges during the regular season, defeating Queen's College of Kingston, the OHA champion, and defeating Smiths Falls, the FAHL champion.

=== Queen's University vs. Ottawa Hockey Club Silver Sevens ===
| Date | Winning Team | Score | Losing Team | Location |
|---|---|---|---|---|
| February 27, 1906 | Ottawa HC | 16–7 | Queen's University | Dey's Arena |
| February 28, 1906 | Ottawa HC | 12–7 | Queen's University | Dey's Arena |
Ottawa wins best-of-three series 2 games to 0

Feb 27, 1906
| Queen's University | 7 | | Ottawa Hockey Club Silver Sevens | 16 |
|---|---|---|---|---|
| Dick Mills | | G | Billy Hague | |
| Hugh McDonnell | | P | Harvey Pulford, Capt. | |
| Eric Sutherland | | CP | Arthur Moore | |
| Marty Walsh | 2 | R | Harry Westwick | 4 |
| Vernon Crawford | 1 | C | Frank McGee | 4 |
| George Richardson | 2 | RW | Alf Smith | 5 |
| William Dobson | 2 | LW | Harry Smith | 3 |
Referees R. Meldrum, Frank Patrick

- Spare - Queens University - B. Sutherland -C
- Spares - Ottawa - Hamilton "Billy" Gilmour -RW, Tommy Smith -C, Stephen "Coo" Dion -F, Jack Ebbs -F.

Feb 28, 1906
| Queen's University | 7 | | Ottawa Hockey Club Silver Sevens | 12 |
|---|---|---|---|---|
| Dick Mills | | G | Billy Hague | |
| Hugh McDonnell | | P | Harvey Pulford, Capt. | 1 |
| Eric Sutherland | 1 | CP | Arthur Moore | 2 |
| Marty Walsh | 2 | R | Harry Westwick | 2 |
| Bruce Sutherland | 1 | C | Frank McGee | 2 |
| George Richardson | 1 | RW | Alf Smith | 2 |
| William Dobson | 1 | LW | Harry Smith | 5 |
Referees R. Meldrum, Frank Patrick

- Spare - Queen's University - V.W. Crawford -C
- Spares - Ottawa - Hamilton "Billy" Gilmour -RW, Tommy Smith -C, Stephen "Coo" Dion -F, Jack Ebbs -F.

The lopsided score of the first game gave indications that the series would be quickly over. One interesting emergence was that of Marty Walsh. Walsh would help hold Ottawa to a 5–3 lead, scoring two goals. In the game's second half, Ottawa broke away after the score was made 5–4 with nine unanswered goals. Ottawa would win game one by a score of 16–7. The game featured many multiple-goal scorers Westwick, McGee, and A. Smith. H Smith for the Senators, and Richardson, Dobbson, and Walsh would each score two for Queen's.

=== Smiths Falls vs. Ottawa ===
| Date | Winning Team | Score | Losing Team | Location |
|---|---|---|---|---|
| March 6, 1906 | Ottawa Hockey Club | 6–5 | Smiths Falls Hockey Club | Dey's Arena |
| March 8, 1906 | Ottawa Hockey Club | 8–2 | Smiths Falls Hockey Club | Dey's Arena |
Ottawa wins best-of-three series 2 games to 0

March 6, 1906
| Smith Falls Hockey Club | 5 | | Ottawa Hockey Club | 6 |
|---|---|---|---|---|
| Percy Lesueur, Capt. | | G | Billy Hague | |
| Harry Brown | 1 | P | Harvey Pulford, Capt. | |
| Harold Armstrong | 1 | CP | Arthur Moore | |
| Hugh Ross | | R | Harry Westwick | |
| Art Serviss | 2 | C | Frank McGee | 5 |
| Bob May | | RW | Alf Smith | 1 |
| Jack Fraser | 1 | LW | Harry Smith | |
Referees R. Meldrum, Frank Patrick

- Spares - Smith Falls - Unknown
- Spares - Ottawa - Hamilton "Billy" Gilmour -RW, Tommy Smith -C, "Coo" Dion -F, Jack Ebbs -F.

March 8, 1906
| Smith Falls Hockey Club | 2 | | Ottawa Hockey Club | 8 |
|---|---|---|---|---|
| Percy Lesueur, Capt. | | G | Billy Hague | |
| Harry Brown | | P | Harvey Pulford, Capt. | |
| Harold Armstrong | | CP | Arthur Moore | |
| Hugh Ross | 1 | R | Harry Westwick | 2 |
| Art Serviss | | C | Frank McGee | 4 |
| Bob May | | RW | Alf Smith | 1 |
| Jack Fraser | 1 | LW | Harry Smith | 1 |
Referees R. Meldrum, Frank Patrick

- Spares - Smith Falls - Unknown
- Spares - Ottawa - Hamilton "Billy" Gilmour -RW, Tommy Smith -C, "Coo" Dion -F, Jack Ebbs -F.

=== ECAHA Playoff ===
As the season produced a tie for the season championship, the defending champion Ottawas and Wanderers played a two-game playoff, with the winner being awarded the Stanley Cup. The series took place on March 14 in Montreal and March 17 in Ottawa. The Wanderers would win the series 9–1, 3–9 (12–10) in dramatic fashion..

Game one

Ottawa was installed as 2–1 betting favourites, but the Wanderers upset the bookies. In the first game in Montreal, the Wanderers dominated Ottawa, as Ernie Russell got four goals, Frank Glass got three and Moose Johnson would get two for a 9–1 victory.

Game two

After the first game, the Ottawas would replace their goalie Billy Hague with the Smiths Falls goalie Percy LeSueur in to play his first game for the club. Despite being down by eight goals, interest in Ottawa for the return match was high. Rush seats on sale the day of the game produced a throng that caused the ticket seller's glass to break. The venue, Dey's Arena, was modified to hold more spectators, including setting up temporary bleachers, removing the grandstand which had been used as a press box, and the installation of a press box attached to the rafters. Over 5,400 would attend the game and the top $2 tickets were being sold for $10. Betting interest was high, including one $12,000 bet.

After twelve minutes, the first goal was scored by the Wanderers' Moose Johnson to increase the goal lead to nine. Ottawa's Frank McGee, Harry Smith, and McGee again scored before half-time, cutting the deficit to 10–4. Harry Smith would score to open the second half, followed by Rat Westwick. Then Westwick scored again to make it 10–7 before Harry Smith scored three straight goals to make the score 9–1, evening the series with ten minutes to play to tie the series, causing a five-minute standing ovation. With seven minutes to play Smith was sent off for the rest of the game and Lester Patrick would score with ninety seconds to play to put the Wanderers back in the lead. Patrick would ice the game with a goal with a few seconds to play. The Silver Seven reign was over.

The Toronto Globe called it the "greatest game of hockey ever played on Canadian ice, or any other." The Sporting News would later dub it the "Greatest Hockey Game in History." Moose Johnson would end up with the Governor-General's top hat. It had been knocked off of the Earl Grey's head, and a fan had snatched it up, giving it to Johnson later in the dressing room.

| Date | Winning Team | Score | Losing Team | Location |
|---|---|---|---|---|
| March 14, 1906 | Montreal Wanderers | 9–1 | Ottawa HC | Montreal Arena |
| March 17, 1906 | Ottawa HC | 9–3 | Montreal Wanderers | Dey's Arena |
Montreal wins total goals series 12 goals to 10

March 14, 1906
| Ottawa Hockey Club 1 | | | Montreal Wanderers 9 | |
| Player | G | Pos | Player | G |
|---|---|---|---|---|
| Bill Hague | | G | Henri "Doc" Menard | |
| Harvey Pulford, Capt. | | P | Billy Strachan | |
| Arthur Moore | | CP | Rod Kennedy | |
| Harry Westwick | | R | Lester Patrick Capt. | 1 |
| Frank McGee | | C | Frank "Pud" Glass | 3 |
| Alf Smith | | RW | Ernie Russell | 4 |
| Harry Smith | 1 | LW | Ernie "Moose" Johnson | 1 |
Referees R. Meldrum, and Brophy

- Spares - Montreal Wanderers - Josh Arnold -RW, Cecil Blachford -RW injured-playing Coach,
- Spares - Ottawa - Hamilton "Billy" Gilmour -RW, Tommy Smith -C, "Coo" Dion -F, Jack Ebbs -F.

March 17, 1906
| Montreal Wanderers 3 | | | Ottawa Hockey Club 9 | |
| Player | G | Pos | Player | G |
|---|---|---|---|---|
| Henri "Doc" Menard | | G | Percy Lesueur | |
| Billy Strachan | | P | Harvey Pulford, Capt. | |
| Rod Kennedy | | CP | Arthur Moore | |
| Lester Patrick Capt. | 2 | R | Harry Westwick | 1 |
| Frank "Pud" Glass | | C | Frank McGee | 2 |
| Ernie Russell | | RW | Alf Smith | 1 |
| Ernie "Moose" Johnson | 1 | LW | Harry Smith | 5 |
Referees R. Meldrum, and Brophy

- Spares - Montreal Wanderers - Josh Arnold -RW, Cecil Blachford -RW injured-playing Coach
- Spares - Ottawa - Billy Hague -G, Hamilton "Billy" Gilmour -RW, Tommy Smith -C, "Coo" Dion -F, Jack Ebbs -F.

Because of the need for the play-off, no challenges were made against western teams until the following winter. Ottawa had won Stanley Cup challenges that season, which meant that the 1906 season would have two Stanley Cup holders: Ottawa until March, and Montreal Wanderers for the balance of the year.

== Stanley Cup engravings ==
The 1906 Stanley Cup was presented twice by the trophy's trustee William Foran.

1906 Ottawa Hockey Club
Players
Forwards
Tommy Smith (centre)
Frank McGee (rover)
Hamilton Billy Gilmour (right wing)
Harry Smith (left wing)
Harry Westwick (also played Rover)
Jack Ebbs
Stephen Coo Dion
Alf Smith (right wing-playing-Coach)
Defencemen
Harvey Pulford (point-Captain)
Arthur Moore (cover point)
Goaltender
Billy Hague

non-players =

- George P. Murphy (President) & Robert T. "Bob" Shillington (manager)
- Patrick Basketville (treasurer), Thomas D'Arcy McGee (secretary)
- Halder Kirby (club doctor), David Barred (team dentist)
- Llewellyn Bates, John Practor "J.P." Dickson, Martin Rosenthal, Charles Sparks (directors)
- Pete Green (trainer), Mac MacGilton (ass't trainer)

all-notes =

- No team picture including all executives has been found for 1906 Ottawa.
- After losing game 9-1 to the Wanderers. Ottawa used Percy LeSueur in goal instead of Bill Hague for two games. LeSueur played his first game for Ottawa, winning 9-3. However, the two-game total was 12 for Montreal Wanderers and 10 for Ottawa. Montreal won the Stanley Cup on March 17. Since LeSueur was not a member of the 1906 Ottawa when they won both their other challenges in 1906, he is not considered a 1906 Stanley Cup Champion. LeSueur played goalie for Smith Falls when they lost to Ottawa only nine days earlier on March 8.

1906 Montreal Wanderers
Players
Forwards
Frank "Pud" Glass (rover)
Lester Patrick (rover-acting captain)
Josh Arnold(right wing) †
Ernie Moose Johnson(right wing)
Ernie Russell(left wing)
Defencemen
Cecil Blachford(point-rover-RW-Captain-Coach)
Billy Strachan(point)
Rod Kennedy(cover point)
Hodgenson "Hod" Stuart (cover point) †
Goaltender
Henri "Doc" Menard †
William "Riley" Hern

† Josh Arnold(RW) and Henri "Doc" Menard(G) were replaced by Hod Stuart(CP) and William "Riley" Hern(G) for the Dec 27, 29, 1906 challenge series with the New Glasgow Cubs. Cecil Blachford moved from Cover Point to Right Wing to replace Josh Arnold.

non-players =

- James Strachan (President), Clarence McKerrow (Hon. President),
- Dickie Boon (manager), George Guile (Vice President), George Hodges (Hon. Vice President)
- Robert "Bob" Stephenson (Secretary-Treasurer), Tom Hodges (Hon. Secretary-Treasurer),
- Robert "Bob" Ahern (director), William Jennings (director), Paul Lefebvre (trainer).

all-notes = In the team picture, eight players are in uniform, and ten members are in suits, plus a mascot. (The Mascot's name remains unknown.)

- Lester Patrick served as Captain while Cecil Blachford was sick due to a blood clot. Blachford helped manager Dickie Boon behind the bench as Coach during the March Stanley Cup challenge.

engraving-notes =

Between 1903 and 1906, Ottawa engraved each of the ten Stanley Cup series they won, and the teams they played outside the bowl. The first eight series were listed separately, but both of the 1906 series are listed together in the same space. Montreal Wanderers was engraved above the 1903 to 1906 winners, with the dates in March and December, plus the two teams they defeated and the scores of all the games. Note: The second game against New Glasgow in December was engraved as a 6 to 2 score when in actuality the Wanderers won the game 7 to 2.

== See also ==
- 1905–06 Ottawa Hockey Club season
- Eastern Canadian Amateur Hockey Association
- List of pre-NHL seasons
- List of ice hockey leagues
- List of Stanley Cup champions

| Preceded by Ottawa Hockey Club; 1905 | Ottawa Hockey Club; Stanley Cup Champions; January 1906 | Succeeded by Montreal Wanderers; March 1906 |
| Preceded by Ottawa Hockey Club; January, 1906 | Montreal Wanderers; Stanley Cup Champions; 1906 | Succeeded by Kenora Thistles; January 1907 |
| Preceded by 1905 CAHL season | ECAHA seasons 1906 | Succeeded by 1907 ECAHA season |
