= Moose Johnson =

Canadian ice hockey player (1886–1963)

- Hockey Hall of Fame, 1952
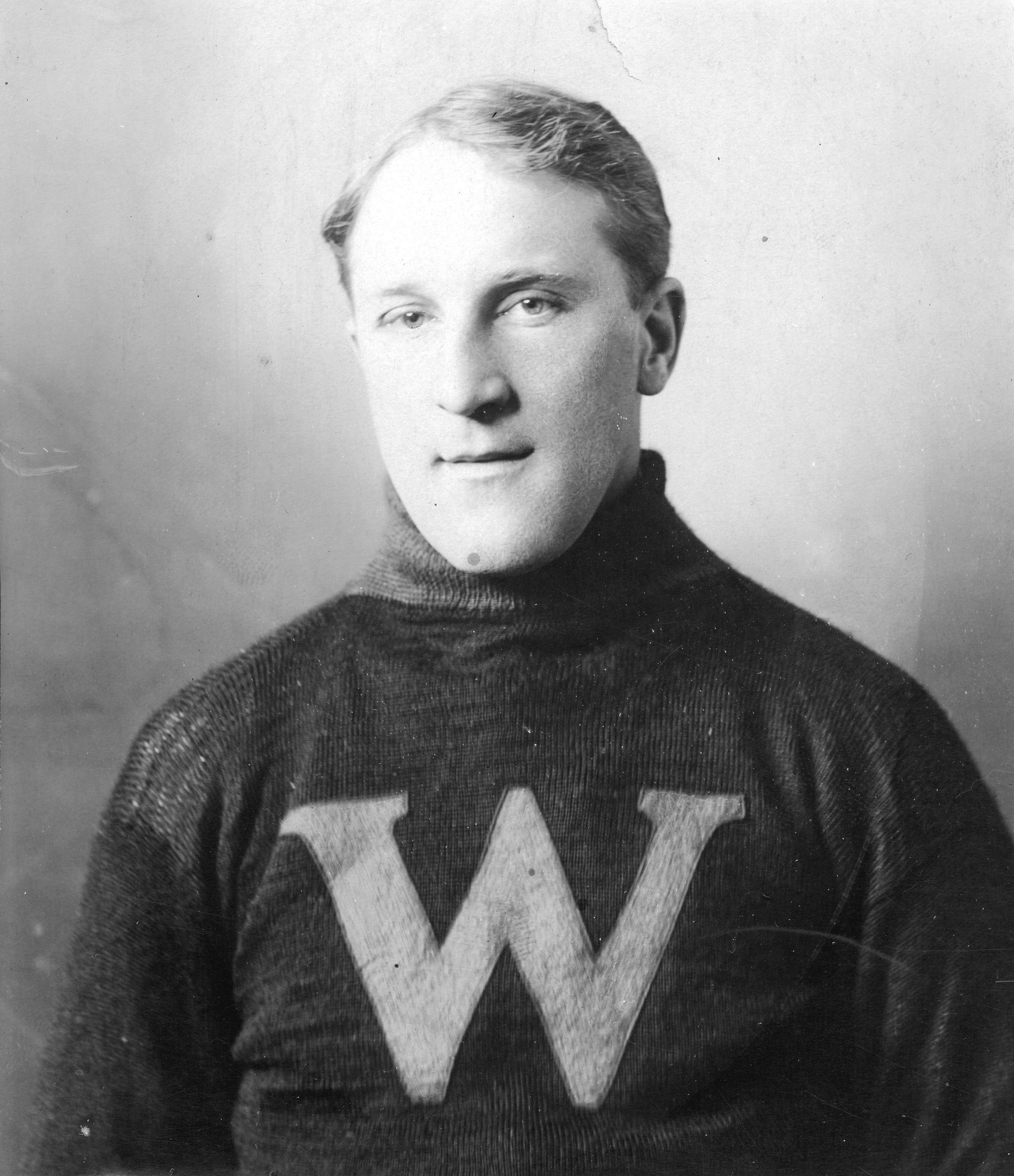
- Johnson in 1912 with the New Westminster Royals
- Born: February 26, 1886 Montreal, Quebec, Canada
- Died: March 25, 1963 (aged 77) White Rock, British Columbia, Canada
- Height: 5 ft 11 in (180 cm)
- Weight: 185 lb (84 kg; 13 st 3 lb)
- Position: Left wing/Defence
- Shot: Left
- Played for: Montreal Hockey Club; Montreal Wanderers; New Westminster Royals; Portland Rosebuds; Victoria Aristocrats
- Playing career: 1903–1931

Thomas Ernest "Moose" Johnson (February 26, 1886 – March 25, 1963), also known as Ernie Johnson, was a Canadian ice hockey player whose professional career spanned from 1905 to 1931. He was a member of four Stanley Cup winning teams between 1905 and 1910 with the Montreal Wanderers of the Eastern Canada Amateur Hockey Association (ECAHA) and later the National Hockey Association (NHA). He moved west, and switched from left wing to defence, in 1911 to join the newly formed Pacific Coast Hockey Association (PCHA). He spent the following decade playing with the New Westminster Royals, Portland Rosebuds and Victoria Aristocrats where he was named a PCHA first-team all-star eight times and played in the 1916 Stanley Cup Final with Portland.

Johnson later played minor professional hockey in California, Minnesota and Oregon before retiring at the age of 45. Johnson was known for using perhaps the longest stick in the game's history, giving him a 99-inch (2.5 m) reach. Johnson was inducted into the Hockey Hall of Fame in 1952.

== Playing career ==
=== Montreal Hockey Club and Montreal Wanderers ===
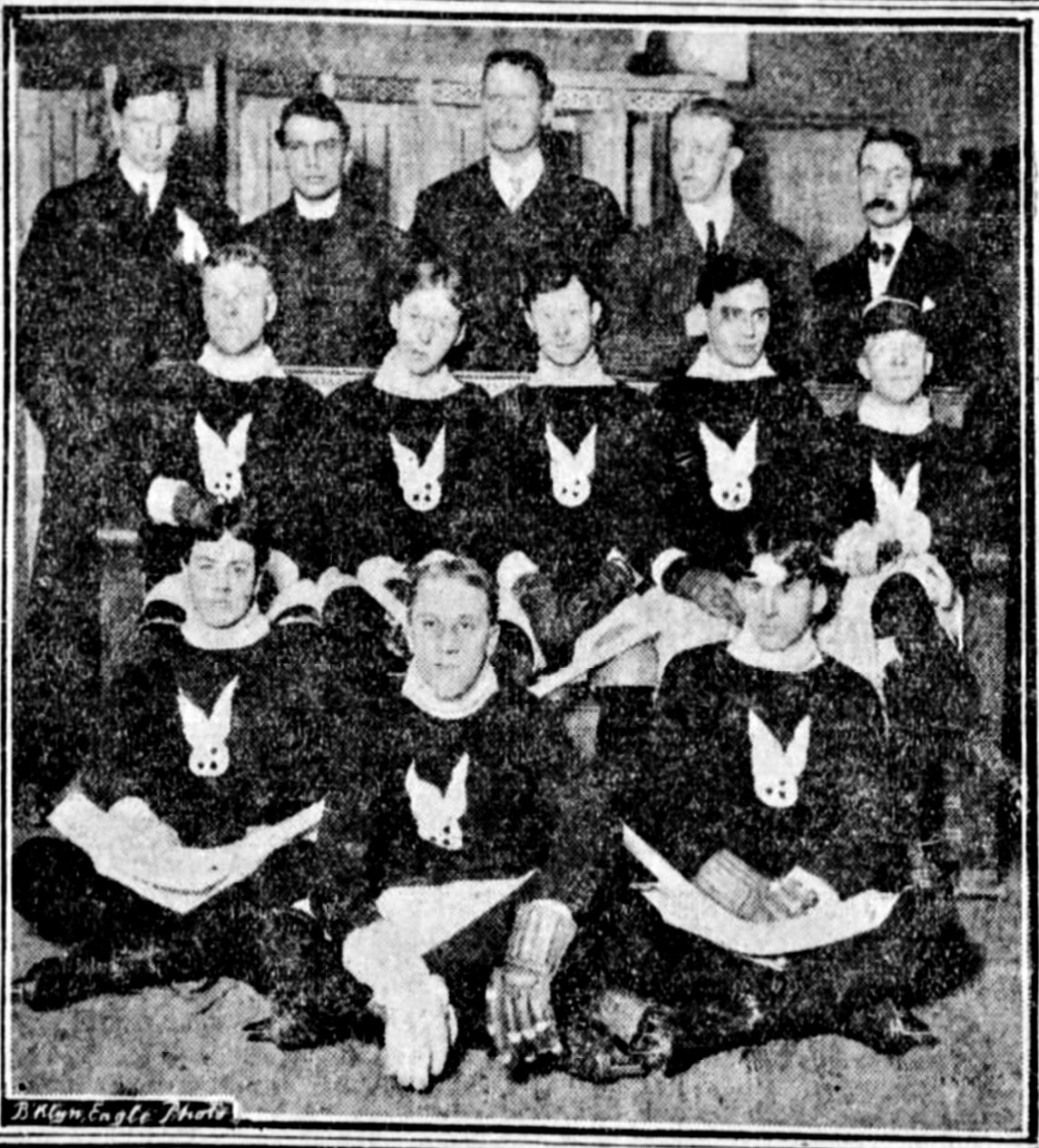
Johnson, at center bottom row, with the 1903–04 Montreal Hockey Club intermediate team.

Johnson's playing career began in 1902 in the Montreal City Hockey League where he would, at times, play with his junior, intermediate and senior teams all in the same weekend. He moved on to the Canadian Amateur Hockey League in 1903 and played two seasons with the Montreal Hockey Club, scoring 9 goals in 11 games in that time. He then moved on to join the Montreal Wanderers of the newly formed Eastern Canada Amateur Hockey Association in 1905, and finished tenth in league scoring with 12 goals. The Wanderers tied with Ottawa HC for the best record in the league with 9–1 records, necessitating a playoff to determine the league champion. Johnson scored a goal in the first game of the two-game, total goal series as Montreal won 9–1 on home ice. Ottawa came back to lead the second game 9–1, and tie the series, but two late goals by Montreal's Lester Patrick gave Montreal the victory, 12–10 on aggregate, to win both the ECAHA championship, and the Stanley Cup as Canada's national amateur champions.

The ECAHA turned professional in 1906–07, and the Wanderers signed Johnson to a contract. Along with teammates Jack Marshall, Hod Stuart, Frank Glass and Riley Hern, Johnson became the first professional player ever allowed to compete for the Stanley Cup as the Wanderers defended a challenge by the New Glasgow Cubs of the Maritime Hockey League prior to the ECAHA season's start. The Wanderers lost a second challenge for the Cup, this time by the Kenora Thistles in January 1907 but finished the ECAHA season with a perfect 10–0 record to earn the right to challenge Kenora to a return matchup in March. Johnson improved to 15 goals in 10 games during the season, and was named to the second all-star team on left wing. He scored five more goals in the six games played over three Stanley Cup challenges, including two in the final game of the second series against Kenora to help the Wanderers regain control of the Cup.

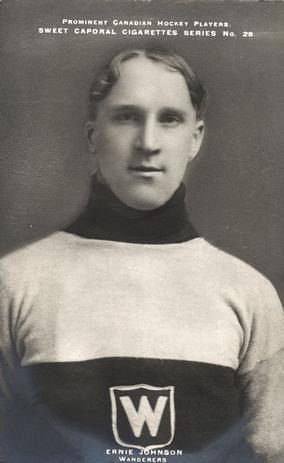
Johnson with the Montreal Wanderers on a 1911 Sweet Caporal postcard.

Johnson was again named to the second all-star team on left wing in 1907–08. His offence fell in the ECAHA season, as he recorded nine goals in 10 games for the ECAHA champion Wanderers, but he added 11 goals in five Stanley Cup challenge games as the Wanderers successfully defended their title on three occasions. Johnson was an offensive star in the challenges, scoring four goals on one game against the Ottawa Victorias in a January 1908 challenge, and again scoring four in a game against the Winnipeg Maple Leafs in a March 1908 challenge. He ended the season by scoring the game-winning goal in a single game challenge by the Toronto Professionals just days after Montreal had defeated Winnipeg. He scored one goal as Montreal again defended the Stanley Cup against the Edmonton Eskimos in a challenge that preceded the 1908–08 ECAHA season, and added ten more during the campaign, but Montreal lost the league title to Ottawa, and with it control of the Stanley Cup.

In 1909–10, the Wanderers jumped to the newly formed National Hockey Association (NHA). Johnson scored seven goals during the season to help the Wanderers win the inaugural league championship, and consequently re-capture the Stanley Cup from Ottawa. The victory marked the fourth time Johnson and the Wanderers had won the trophy since 1905. Johnson completed his second NHA season in 1910–11, scoring six goals and recording 60 penalty minutes in 16 games.

Johnson grew up in the same neighbourhood of Pointe-Saint-Charles in Montreal as fellow Wanderers player Frank "Pud" Glass. The two were inseparable companions off the ice and also teamed well together on the ice. Johnson and Glass played together on the 1902–03 Montreal St. Lawrence team in the Montreal City Hockey League before rejoining in the 1906 season on the Montreal Wanderers. At the onset of the 1905–06 season Brooklyn Skating Club manager Tom Howard tried to acquire both Johnson and Glass to his club, but the AAHL rules committee ruled the Canadians ineligible to play with the American club on counts of professionalism.

=== New Westminster, Portland and Victoria ===
When Lester and Frank Patrick formed the Pacific Coast Hockey Association (PCHA) in 1911, they sought to lure the NHA's top stars out west. Johnson, by then considered one of the game's best players, was among the players who jumped at the higher salaries the Patricks were offering. Johnson was placed on the New Westminster Royals, and switched positions from left wing to cover-point (defence). He remained a star on offence, scoring nine goals in 14 games, and was named to the PCHA's first all-star team, as New Westminster won the inaugural PCHA championship. Prior to the 1912–13 season, and despite being branded an "outlaw" by the NHA, Johnson appeared ready to return to the Wanderers as he signed a new contract with the eastern team. However, he previously signed a contract with the Royals, and ultimately chose to remain with New Westminster.

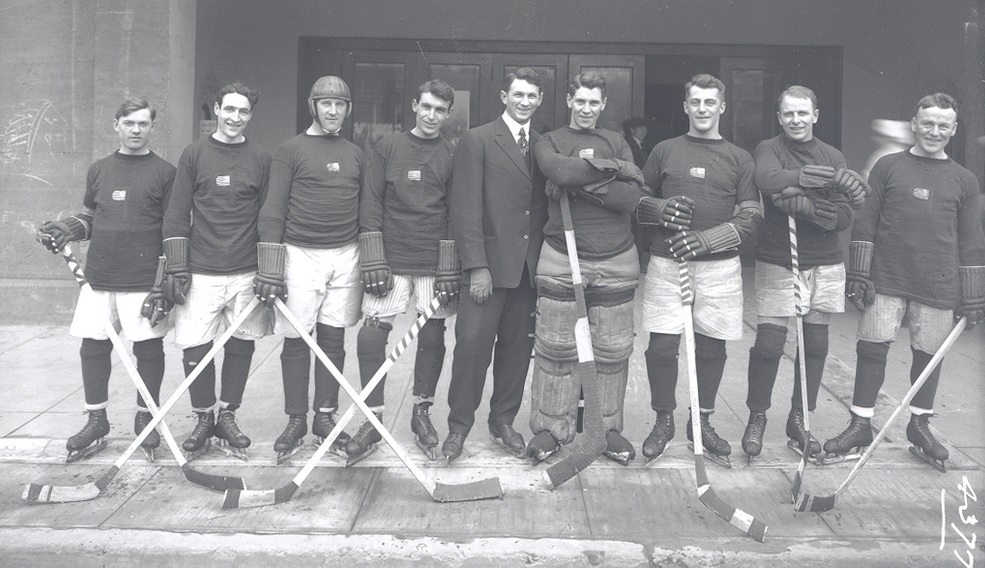
Johnson, third from left, with the 1914–15 Portland Rosebuds

Johnson was again named to the all-star team that season, then played a third year in New Westminster in 1913–14 though he missed a month of the season after suffering a deep laceration on his leg during a game. Following the season, he moved to Portland, Oregon when the Royals transferred south to become the Portland Rosebuds. He again made the all-star team in 1915, the first of five consecutive seasons in which he did so. Johnson again faced contract issues prior to the 1915–16 NHA season when he refused to sign Portland's offer, demanding better terms. He eventually signed with Portland, and was reported to have turned down lucrative offers to return to the NHA.

The Rosebuds won the PCHA championship that season, and in doing so became the first American team to compete for the Stanley Cup. For Johnson, it marked his first in a Stanley Cup Final in six years, and was not without controversy. The Rosebuds faced the NHA's Montreal Canadiens, and the entire series was played in Montreal. As a consequence of his jumping to the PCHA in 1911, Montreal Wanderers owner Sam Lichtenhein had won a judgement against Johnson for $2,000 for breach of contract, but it was not enforceable unless he returned to the jurisdiction of Quebec's courts. When it became known that Lichtenhein would gain Johnson's salary for playing in the series, Johnson contemplated refusing to play. He decided to play in the series anyway, and scored one goal in the five-game series. The Canadiens won the best-of-five series 3–2.

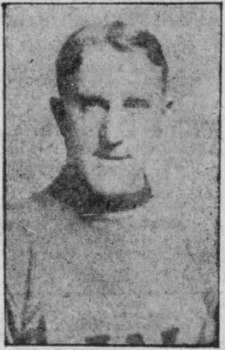
Johnson with the Victoria Aristocrats.

Lester Patrick, managing the Spokane Canaries, thought he had an agreement to secure Johnson's playing rights for the 1916–17 season. Portland had come to verbal agreement with Patrick that they would do so if he would relinquish claims on four players Portland sought to sign. When it was determined that some of those players would not report to Portland, the Rosebuds refused to relinquish Johnson, leading Patrick to claim he had been "double crossed". Remaining with the Rosebuds, Johnson posted a career-high 21 points in 1916–17.

When the Rosebuds relocated to Victoria, British Columbia to become the Victoria Aristocrats, Johnson moved north with the team. His offence had declined since 1917, as he scored only five, six and five points in the following three seasons, and no goals in that third season of 1919–20. He improved to five goals and seven points in 1920–21, and was named a first-team all-star for the eighth time. However, when his play was met with jeers from the home fans in the 1921–22 season, Johnson felt it was time to retire.

Johnson returned to hockey in 1926 with the Los Angeles Palais-de-Glace when he played a couple of games in the Commercial Hockey League before spending the winter of 1926–27 with the Minneapolis Millers of the American Hockey Association. He again returned to the game in 1928–29 with the Portland Buckaroos of the Pacific Coast Hockey League, then played two seasons in the California Hockey League between 1929 and 1931 with the Hollywood Millionaires and then the San Francisco Tigers before retiring for good at the age of 45. Johnson was elected to the Hockey Hall of Fame in 1952.

== Playing style ==
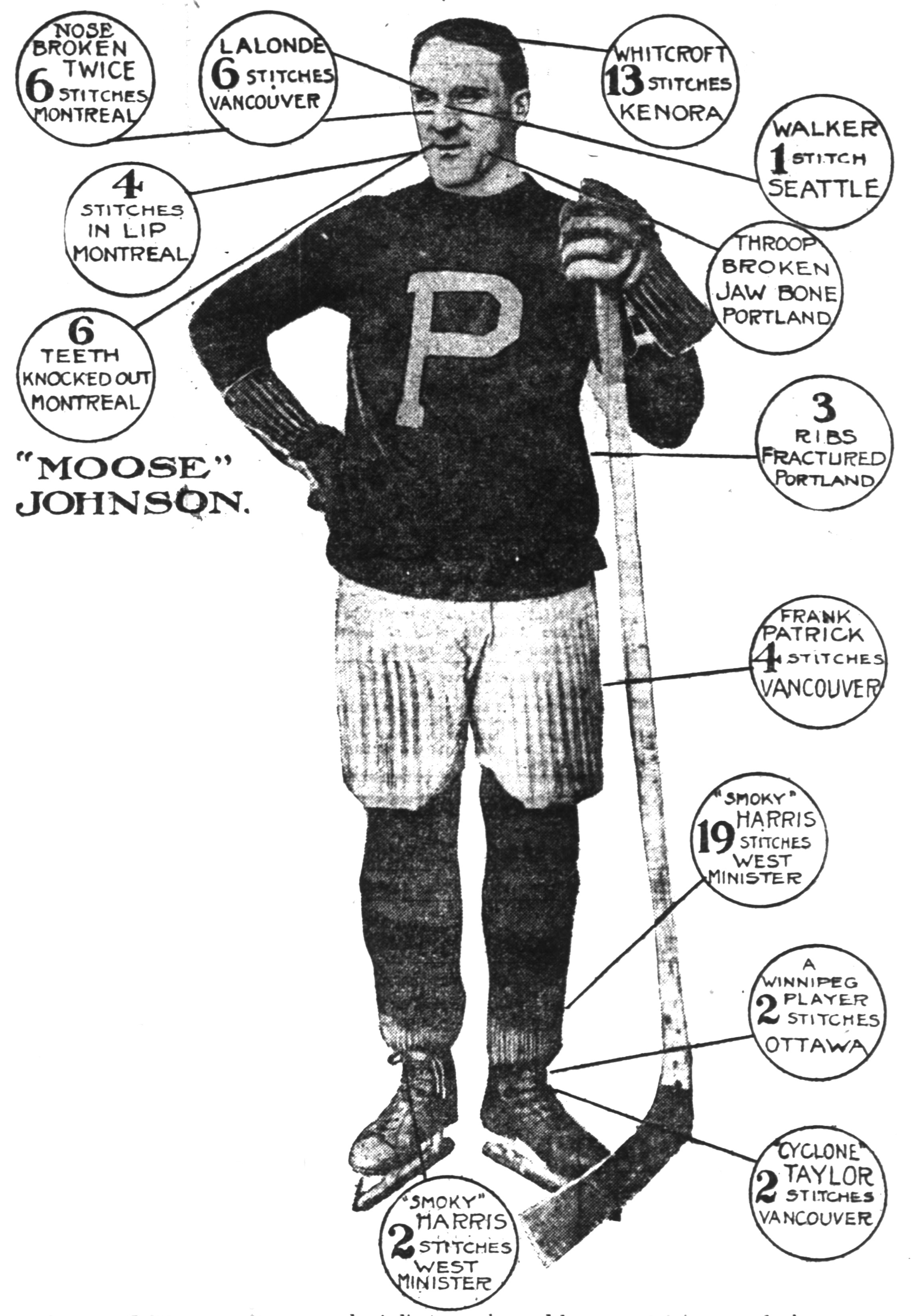
A diagram of injuries suffered by Johnson from the January 30, 1916 edition of The Oregon Daily Journal

Johnson was one of the most dominant rushing defensemen of the late-1900s and 1910s. Drawing frequent comparisons to Cyclone Taylor – as Brad Park would to Bobby Orr sixty years later – Johnson was noted for his long, smooth skating stride which allowed him to cover a large amount of ice very quickly and contribute to the attack. He was a consistent scoring threat from the back end through his whole career; in his rookie and sophomore seasons with the Wanderers, he was among the top ten goal scorers in the league, and scored eleven goals over five challenge games during the successful 1908 post-season.

Johnson's offensive upside was such that his coaches would occasionally play him on the left wing, as against the Kenora Thistles in a 1907 challenge match. Si Griffis, playing for the Thistles at the time, claimed that it was Johnson's play which determined the Wanderers' victory. In six playoff games that year, Johnson scored five goals.

"Picture a big husky six-footer, with a terrific burst of speed, a body check stiff enough to break a man's spine and a shot like a bullet, a person with indomitable energy and an apparent determination to win at all costs."

— Ottawa Citizen report on Johnson after a 7-5 Wanderers victory over Ottawa, February 21, 1910

Although he sometimes drew complaints about his inconsistent checking through the first half-decade of his career, Johnson was able to effectively use his speed to break up plays and transition the puck. Nevertheless, Johnson was able to round out his defensive game by the midpoint of his career, and became infamous for his use of the poke check. Combined with his 5'11" height and 31-inch wingspan, Johnson's use of abnormally long sticks gave him a reach of anywhere from 81 to 99 inches. In this way, he was able to check nine feet of ice at any given time. One of the very few players who could do so at the time, Johnson was as capable skating backwards as he was going forwards. His favourite defensive tactic was to face an oncoming puck carrier head on, skating backwards whilst continuously jabbing and poking at the puck.

Johnson's poke check could also be used to force turnovers and generate offensive rushes. Combining good breakaway speed with positional awareness, Johnson would charge an oncoming attacker, use his poke check to strip the player of the puck, bank it off the sideboards and race after it. While on the attack himself, he would often deliberately make as if he were dumping the puck in. Instead, when thirty feet from the opposing net, he would deliberately fire the puck along the boards so that it rimmed around behind the opponent's goalie; however, rather than chase after it, he would subsequently cut across the slot and pick up the puck as it came out the other side.

Johnson was the first hockey player to earn the nickname "Moose", and became infamous for his rough style of play – though he was rarely known to be dirty, as contemporaries Sprague Cleghorn and Billy Coutu were. He was the frequent source of injuries on whichever team he played for – while playing for the Portland Rosebuds in 1915, he had his jaw broken, two ribs fractured, two stitches each in his right leg and left ankle, a flattened shin bone and a badly bruised thigh. The prior season with New Westminster, he received seventeen stitches in one shin after it was laid open to the bone by an opposing player's skate, and had his eye loosened in its socket from an especially violent body check. Nevertheless, in tribute to his toughness, Johnson missed only one game in those two seasons.

"He is all grit, and to quit does not exist in his makeup."

— Oregon Daily Journal on Johnson's toughness in dealing with his injuries, February 28, 1915

During the 1917–18 season, Johnson's final one in Portland, he collided with Vancouver Millionaires defenseman Si Griffis when the two teams met in Vancouver on January 14 and suffered torn ligaments to his shoulder. Despite the serious injury Johnson continued playing the game, and he also played the following game between the two teams in Portland two days later on January 16 before finally collapsing.

Johnson missed three weeks and seven games resting his wrenched shoulder but was back again on February 8 against the Vancouver Millionaires, Portland winning the home contest 8 goals to 4 and Johnson playing with his shoulder strapped in a leather case.

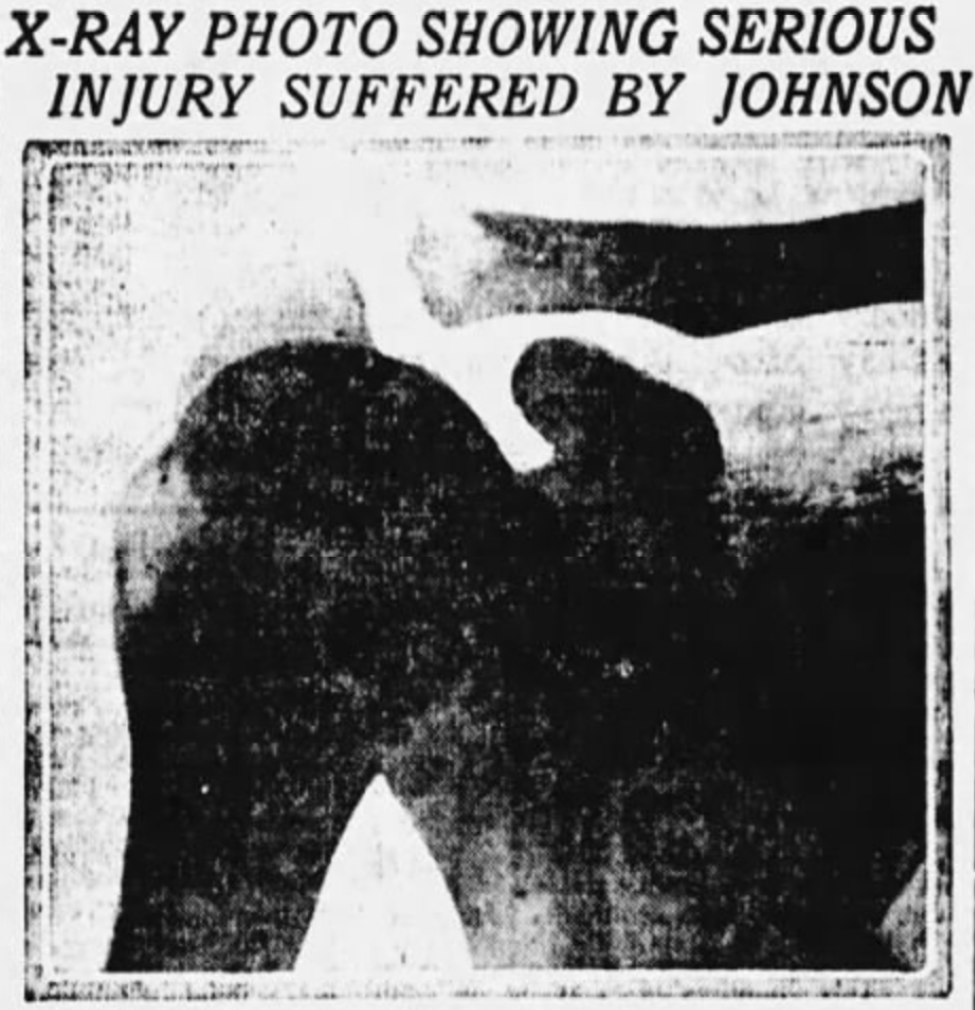
X-ray showing Johnson's torn shoulder after a collision with Si Griffis on January 14, 1918

To his supporters, Johnson's proneness to injury was a result of his physical style of play and the retaliation that came with it, and he was often touted as a relatively clean player. Notwithstanding, his detractors pointed to a few notable incidents as evidence of his being overbearing, such as when he was involved in a brawl with Frank Patrick of the Vancouver Millionaires while drunk on the ice after a losing effort:

...The climax was reached when Johnson and Patrick came together in the second period, a scrap being started immediately. Previous to this Johnson had checked Patrick across the face...the men came together and it took practically all members of both teams and the referee to pry them apart...The big fellow had made himself disagreeable throughout the game, hacking, checking and doing everything possible to hurt the Vancouver [players]. Not satisfied with this, he had to trip the referee...Johnson then picked his quarrel with Frank Patrick and they came to blows. They rolled over the ice locked in each other's arms and it took quite a bunch of husky fellows to pry them apart.

Johnson accumulated eight seasons where his penalty totals were triple or quadruple the number of games played.

Johnson's gritty play, however, complemented his offensive prowess exceptionally well. He was named to the ECAHA Second All-Star team in 1908, and the PCHA First All-Star Team in 1912, 1913, 1915, 1916, 1917, 1918, 1919, and 1921.

In 1937, Arthur Mann wrote in The Washington Evening Star, "Nobody ever knew how Moose Johnson got so tough, but tough he was. He had taken up hockey after losing three fingers on his right hand in a railroad accident — he had been a train brakeman. At the age of forty-four, Moose went back to railroading. The ice game had been a pleasantly rough interlude through life."

== Off the ice ==
Johnson was born in the neighbourhood of Pointe-Saint-Charles in Montreal, Quebec on February 26, 1886. As a 14-year-old in 1900, he suffered an accident in which he survived a 2,300 volt electrical shock, but the incident resulted in the loss of two fingers on his right hand. Upon moving to the pacific coast, Johnson took on a job working for the Union Pacific Railroad, working with the railway during the summers in between hockey seasons. He settled in Portland when his career ended and worked full-time as a brakeman for Union Pacific until he retired to White Rock, British Columbia in 1954. He suffered a stroke in 1961, and died two years later at the age of 77.

== Career statistics ==
=== Regular season and playoffs ===
			Regular season					Playoffs
Season	Team	League	GP	G	A	Pts	PIM	GP	G	A	Pts	PIM
1903–04	Montreal AAA	CAHL	2	1	0	1	–	–	–	–	–	–
1904–05	Montreal AAA	CAHL	9	8	0	8	9	—	—	—	—	—
1905–06	Montreal Wanderers	ECAHA	10	12	0	12	44	2	1	0	1	3
1906–07	Montreal Wanderers	ECAHA	10	15	0	15	42	—	—	—	—	—
1907–08	Montreal Wanderers	ECAHA	10	9	0	9	33	—	—	—	—	—
1908–09	Montreal Wanderers	ECAHA	10	10	0	10	34	—	—	—	—	—
1909–10	Montreal Wanderers	NHA	13	7	0	7	47	—	—	—	—	—
1910–11	Montreal Wanderers	NHA	16	6	0	6	60	—	—	—	—	—
1911–12	New Westminster Royals	PCHA	14	9	0	9	13	—	—	—	—	—
1912–13	New Westminster Royals	PCHA	13	7	3	10	15	—	—	—	—	—
1913–14	New Westminster Royals	PCHA	16	3	5	8	27	—	—	—	—	—
1914–15	Portland Rosebuds	PCHA	18	6	4	10	21	—	—	—	—	—
1915–16	Portland Rosebuds	PCHA	18	6	3	9	62	—	—	—	—	—
1916–17	Portland Rosebuds	PCHA	24	12	9	21	54	—	—	—	—	—
1917–18	Portland Rosebuds	PCHA	15	3	2	5	3	—	—	—	—	—
1918–19	Victoria Aristocrats	PCHA	15	3	3	6	0	—	—	—	—	—
1919–20	Victoria Aristocrats	PCHA	21	0	5	5	22	—	—	—	—	—
1920–21	Victoria Aristocrats	PCHA	24	5	2	7	26	—	—	—	—	—
1921–22	Victoria Cougars	PCHA	13	1	1	2	12	—	—	—	—	—
ECAHA totals			40	46	0	46	153	2	1	0	1	3
NHA totals			29	13	0	13	107	—	—	—	—	—
PCHA totals			191	55	38	93	255	—	—	—	—	—

=== Stanley Cup challenges ===
Season	Team	League	GP	G	A	Pts	PIM
1906–07	Montreal Wanderers	ECAHA	6	5	0	5	8
1907–08	Montreal Wanderers	ECAHA	5	11	0	11	28
1908–09	Montreal Wanderers	ECAHA	2	1	0	1	6
1909–10	Montreal Wanderers	NHA	1	0	0	0	0
1915–16	Portland Rosebuds	PCHA	5	1	0	1	9
Totals			19	18	0	18	51
