= Frank Glass =

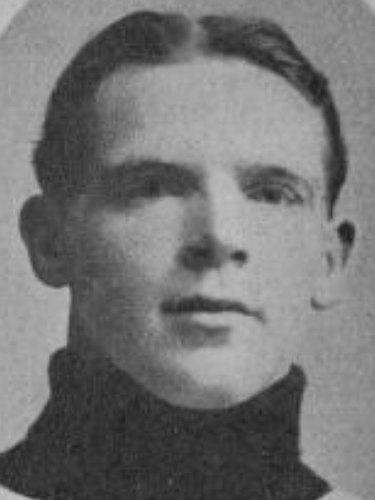
- Born: February 10, 1884 Broughty Ferry, Scotland, GBR
- Died: March 2, 1965 (aged 81) Morrisburg, Ontario, Canada
- Height: 5 ft 10 in (178 cm)
- Weight: 190 lb (86 kg; 13 st 8 lb)
- Position: Left wing/Rover
- Shot: Left
- Played for: Montreal St. Lawrence; Montreal St. Charles; Montreal Wanderers; Montreal Canadiens
- Playing career: 1904–1912

Frank "Pud" Glass (February 10, 1884 – March 2, 1965) was a Scottish-Canadian professional ice hockey player who played in various professional and amateur leagues, including the National Hockey Association and Eastern Canada Amateur Hockey Association. He was a member of the Montreal Wanderers' Stanley Cup champion teams in the 1905–06, 1906–07, 1907–08 and 1909–10 seasons. He was the captain of Montreal Wanderers when they won their fourth Stanley Cup.

== Playing career ==
Frank Glass was born in Broughty Ferry, Scotland, but raised in Canada. He played hockey in his neighbourhood of Pointe-Saint-Charles in Montreal. His first senior team was the Montreal Wanderers, then an amateur team for the 1904–05 season.

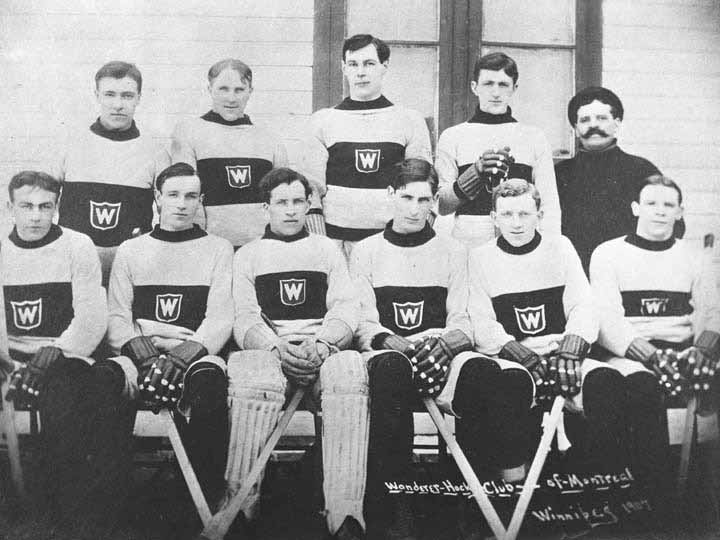
Glass, at far right in the front row, with the 1906–07 Montreal Wanderers.

He would play for the Montreal Wanderers for seven seasons. In 1906, he became a professional paid player on the Wanderers, one of five out of a roster of nine. He first signed a contract with the Montreal Hockey Club, then chose not to report and signed with the Wanderers instead for more money. His situation caused a problem for the league, which eventually allowed him to play for the Wanderers and fined him $50. A similar situation occurred before the 1907–08 season and Glass was again fined and threatened with league expulsion if he signed two contracts again. During his time with the Wanderers the Wanderers were the top team in the country, winning league championship and Stanley Cups from 1906 until 1910. In 1911–12, his final season, he played for the Montreal Canadiens.

Frank Glass grew up in the same neighbourhood of Pointe-Saint-Charles in Montreal as fellow Montreal Wanderers player Ernie "Moose" Johnson, and the two were inseparable companions off the ice and also teamed well together on the ice. Glass and Johnson played together on the 1902–03 Montreal St. Lawrence team in the Montreal City Hockey League before rejoining in the 1906 season on the Montreal Wanderers in the ECAHA. At the onset of the 1905–06 season Brooklyn Skating Club manager Tom Howard tried to acquire both Glass and Johnson to his club, but the AAHL rules committee ruled the Canadians ineligible to play with the American club on counts of professionalism.

== Deployment and playing style ==
Outside of the left wing position, Glass also played as a rover, the more free-roaming position in the seven man game between defence and the forward line. The March 21, 1908 issue of the Ottawa Citizen, in a review of the players on the Montreal Wanderers, claimed that Glass' greatest strength as a player was his checking. The newspaper claimed that Glass' effectiveness as a player was not evidently visible to the spectators:

"His work does not show up, and frequently spectators see little to his play. Forwards and defence men on other teams, however, will tell you that Glass is one of the hardest players in the game to get past. His checking back through center ice is also of great assistance to the defence."

— Ottawa Citizen on Frank Glass on March 21, 1908.

== Career statistics ==
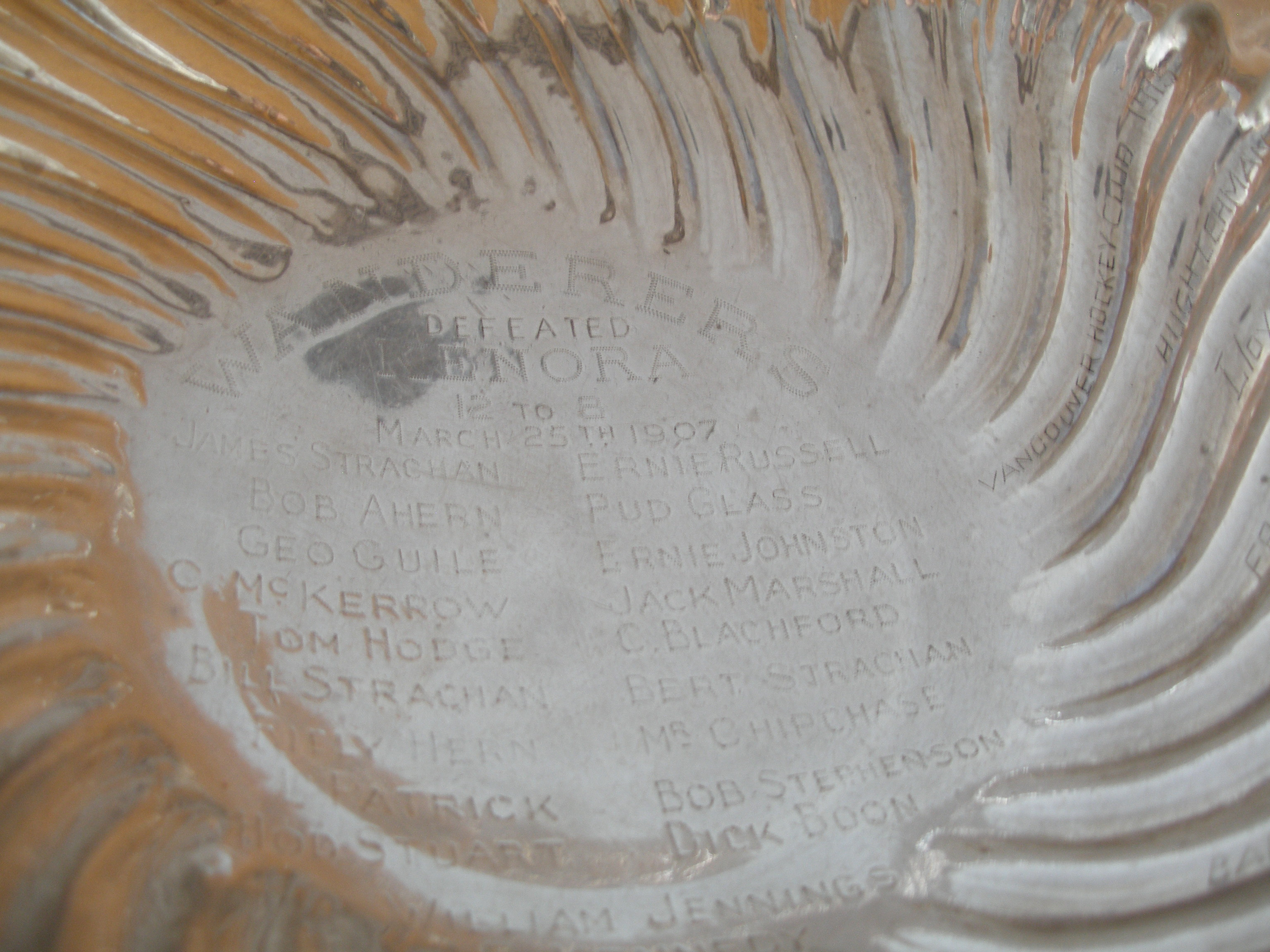
Close-up of bowl portion of Stanley Cup featuring Pud Glass' name.

MCHL = Montreal City Hockey League

			Regular season		Playoffs
Season	Team	League	GP	G	GP	G
1901–02	Montreal St. Lawrence	MCHL	–	–	–	–
1902–03	Montreal St. Lawrence	MCHL	–	–	–	–
1903–04	Montreal St. Charles	MCHL	–	–	–	–
1904–05	Montreal Wanderers	FAHL	6	9	–	–
1906	Montreal Wanderers	ECAHA	10	10	–	–
1906	Montreal Wanderers	Stanley Cup	–	–	2	3
1907	Montreal Wanderers	ECAHA	10	13	–	–
1907	Montreal Wanderers	Stanley Cup	–	–	6	8
1907–08	Montreal Wanderers	ECAHA	9	3	–	–
1907–08	Montreal Wanderers	Stanley Cup	–	–	5	6
1909	Montreal Wanderers	ECHA	12	18	–	–
1909	Montreal Wanderers	Stanley Cup	–	–	2	5
1910	Montreal Wanderers	NHA	12	15	–	–
1910	Montreal Wanderers	Stanley Cup	–	–	1	0
1910–11	Montreal Wanderers	NHA	16	17	–	–
1911–12	Montreal Canadiens	NHA	16	8	–	–
Senior Totals			91	93	16	22

== See also ==
- 1907 ECAHA season
- 1908 ECAHA season
- 1909 ECAHA season
- 1910 NHA season
