= Ernie Russell =

Canadian ice hockey player (1883–1963)

- Hockey Hall of Fame, 1965
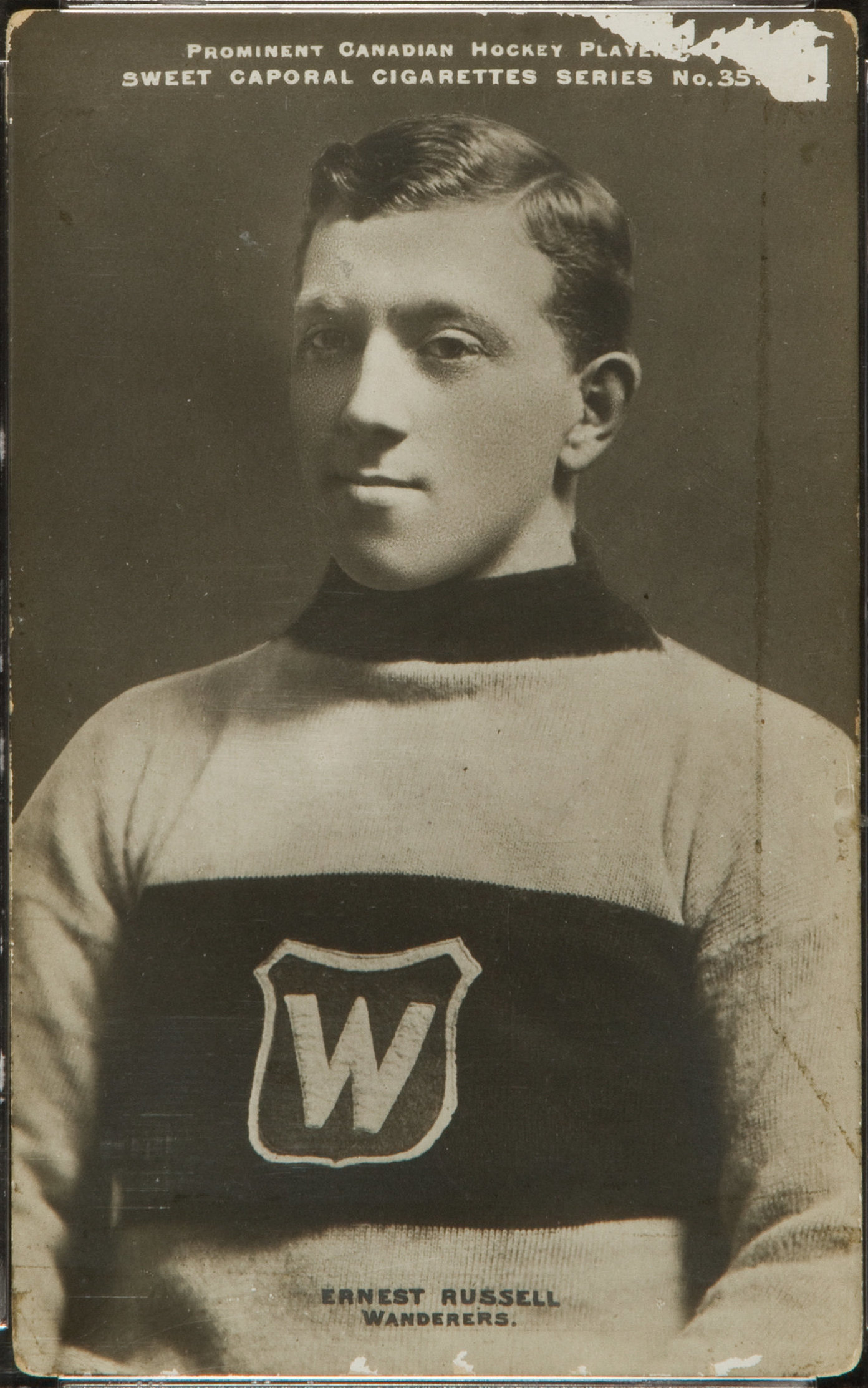
- Russell in 1911
- Born: October 21, 1883 Montreal, Quebec, Canada
- Died: February 23, 1963 (aged 79) Montreal, Quebec, Canada
- Height: 5 ft 6 in (168 cm)
- Weight: 155 lb (70 kg; 11 st 1 lb)
- Position: Centre
- Shot: Right
- Played for: Montreal Hockey Club; Montreal Wanderers
- Playing career: 1904–1914

Ernest Russell (October 21, 1883 – February 23, 1963) was a Canadian professional ice hockey player. He was born in Montreal, Quebec, and played for the Montreal HC and Montreal Wanderers in the early 1900s. Russell was the offensive star of the Wanderers that won the Stanley Cup in 1906, 1907, 1908, and 1910. He once scored a hat-trick in five consecutive games. Russell was inducted into the Hockey Hall of Fame in 1965.

== Career ==
Russell started out his senior hockey career with the Montreal Hockey Club, an off-shoot of the Montreal Amateur Athletic Association, in the CAHL in 1904–05. He also played football with the Montreal Football Club, also under the M.A.A.A. organization, as a half back.

Russell moved to the Montreal Wanderers of the ECAHA for the 1906 ECAHA season, alongside his Montreal HC teammate Ernie "Moose" Johnson, and in his first season with the club the Wanderers won the Stanley Cup after defeating the Ottawa Senators 12-10 (9–1, 3–9) on March 14 and 17, 1906 with Russell scoring four goals in the first game.

The Wanderers replicated their Stanley Cup winning feat during the 1906–07 season, defeating the Kenora Thistles 12-9 (7–2, 5–6) in Winnipeg on March 23 and 25, with Russell scoring five of his team's goals. During the regular season he had led the ECAHA in scoring with 43 goals in nine games.

Prior to the 1907–08 season there were talks about Russell rejoining the Montreal Hockey Club, but he stayed with the Montreal Wanderers instead of going back to his former club, with the result that the M.A.A.A. organization expelled him from their ranks, which meant that he could no longer play football with the Montreal Football Club. With the Wanderers he won his third consecutive Stanley Cup honors after the team defeated the Winnipeg Maple Leafs 20-8 (11–5, 9–3) on March 10 and 12, and the Toronto Professionals of the OPHL 6–4 on March 14, with Russell scoring 11 of his team's 26 goals.

Russell did not play during the 1908–09 season, but he was back with the Wanderers at the end of the 1910 NHA season, and on March 12, 1910, he won his fourth Stanley Cup with the team after it defeated the Berlin Dutchmen of the OPHL 7–3, with Russell scoring four of his team's goals.

Russel played four seasons in the NHA with the Wanderers and retired after the 1913–14 season.

== Playing style ==
Russell played as a centre forward with a primary task of scoring goals. The Ottawa Citizen in March 1908, giving brief sketches on the players on the Montreal Wanderers, noted that Russell's value to his team had been his scoring, and also pointed out that "right in front of the nets there is scarcely a more dangerous forward in the game." The Ottawa Citizen gave further compliments on his "good eye" and "strong wrist" and stated that he could "keep control under difficult conditions."

== Career statistics ==
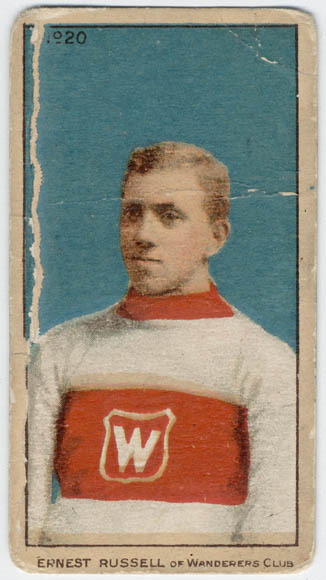
Russell on an Imperial Tobacco hockey card

			Regular season					Playoffs
Season	Team	League	GP	G	A	Pts	PIM	GP	G	A	Pts	PIM
1904–05	Montreal HC	CAHL	8	11	0	11	—	—	—	—	—	—
1905–06	Montreal Wanderers	ECAHA	6	21	0	21	13	—	—	—	—	—
1905–06	Montreal Wanderers	St-Cup	—	—	—	—	—	2	4	0	4	6
1906–07	Montreal Wanderers	ECAHA	9	43	0	43	26	—	—	—	—	—
1906–07	Montreal Wanderers	St-Cup	—	—	—	—	—	5	12	0	12	35
1907–08	Montreal Wanderers	ECHA	9	20	0	20	37	—	—	—	—	—
1907–08	Montreal Wanderers	St-Cup	—	—	—	—	—	3	11	0	11	7
1908–09	Did not play
1909–10	Montreal Wanderers	St-Cup	—	—	—	—	—	1	4	0	4	3
1910–11	Montreal Wanderers	NHA	11	18	0	18	56	—	—	—	—	—
1911–12	Montreal Wanderers	NHA	18	27	0	27	110	—	—	—	—	—
1912–13	Montreal Wanderers	NHA	15	7	0	7	48	—	—	—	—	—
1913–14	Montreal Wanderers	NHA	12	2	4	6	21	—	—	—	—	—
ECAHA/ECHA totals			24	84	0	84	76	—	—	—	—	—
NHA totals			69	89	4	93	292	—	—	—	—	—
St-Cup totals			—	—	—	—	—	11	31	0	31	51

== Awards and achievements ==
- Stanley Cup – 1906, 1907, 1908, and 1910
- ECAHA leading scorer – 1906–07
