= Harry Manson =

Harry Manson may refer to:

- Harry Manson (ice hockey)
- Harry Manson (soccer)
