= Larry Gilmour =

Canadian ice hockey player (1881–1922)

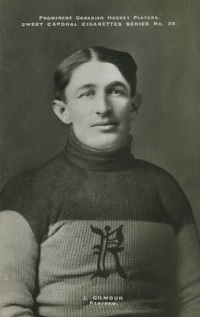
- Born: October 18, 1881 Lanark, Ontario, Canada
- Died: April 15, 1922 (aged 40) Horton, Ontario, Canada
- Height: 6 ft 0 in (183 cm)
- Weight: 170 lb (77 kg; 12 st 2 lb)
- Position: Right wing
- Shot: Right
- Played for: Montreal Wanderers; Renfrew Creamery Kings
- Playing career: 1898–1911

John Lorne "Larry" Gilmour (October 18, 1881 – April 15, 1922) was a Canadian professional ice hockey player in the early 1900s. He was a member of the 1908 Stanley Cup champion Montreal Wanderers.

== Playing career ==
Born in Almonte, Ontario, Gilmour played for the Renfrew, Ontario Hockey Club in the Ottawa Valley Hockey League from 1898 until 1902 when he joined the Renfrew Riversides in the Upper Ottawa Valley Hockey League. In 1907, he joined the Renfrew Creamery Kings, playing for the club until 1911. In 1908, Gilmour also played for the Brockville, Ontario Hockey Club when the Kings were hired to play for Brockville in the Federal Amateur Hockey League and he played for the Montreal Wanderers.

In 1911, after the dissolution of the Creamery Kings, Gilmour chose not to join the Montreal Canadiens to which he'd been assigned. He chose to become a coach in the Renfrew area. He died of pneumonia in 1922.
