= Ed Hogan (ice hockey) =

Canadian ice hockey player

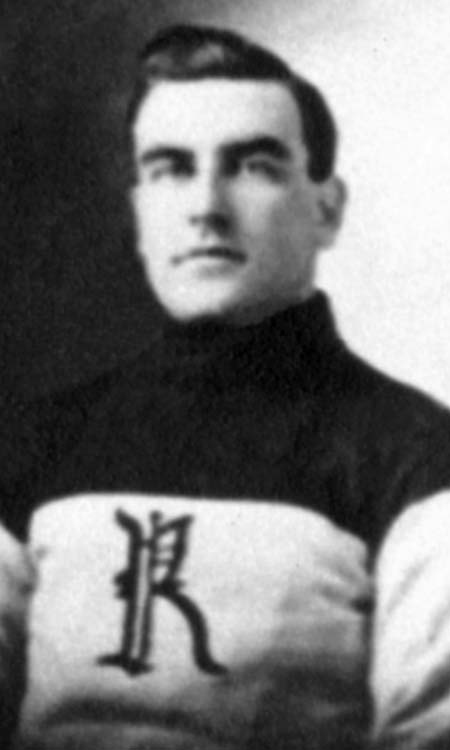
- Hogan with the Renfrew Creamery Kings
- Born: April 18, 1882; Quebec City, Quebec, Canada
- Died: June 3, 1953 (aged 71); Montreal, Quebec, Canada
- Height: 5 ft 8 in (173 cm)
- Weight: 170 lb (77 kg; 12 st 2 lb)
- Position: Right wing
- Shot: Right
- Played for: Quebec Hockey Club; Pittsburgh Professionals; Renfrew Creamery Kings
- Playing career: 1899–1910

Edward Jeremiah Hogan (April 18, 1882 – June 3, 1953) was a Canadian amateur and professional ice hockey player from Quebec City, primarily a winger position wise, who was active during the first decade of the 1900s.

== Career ==
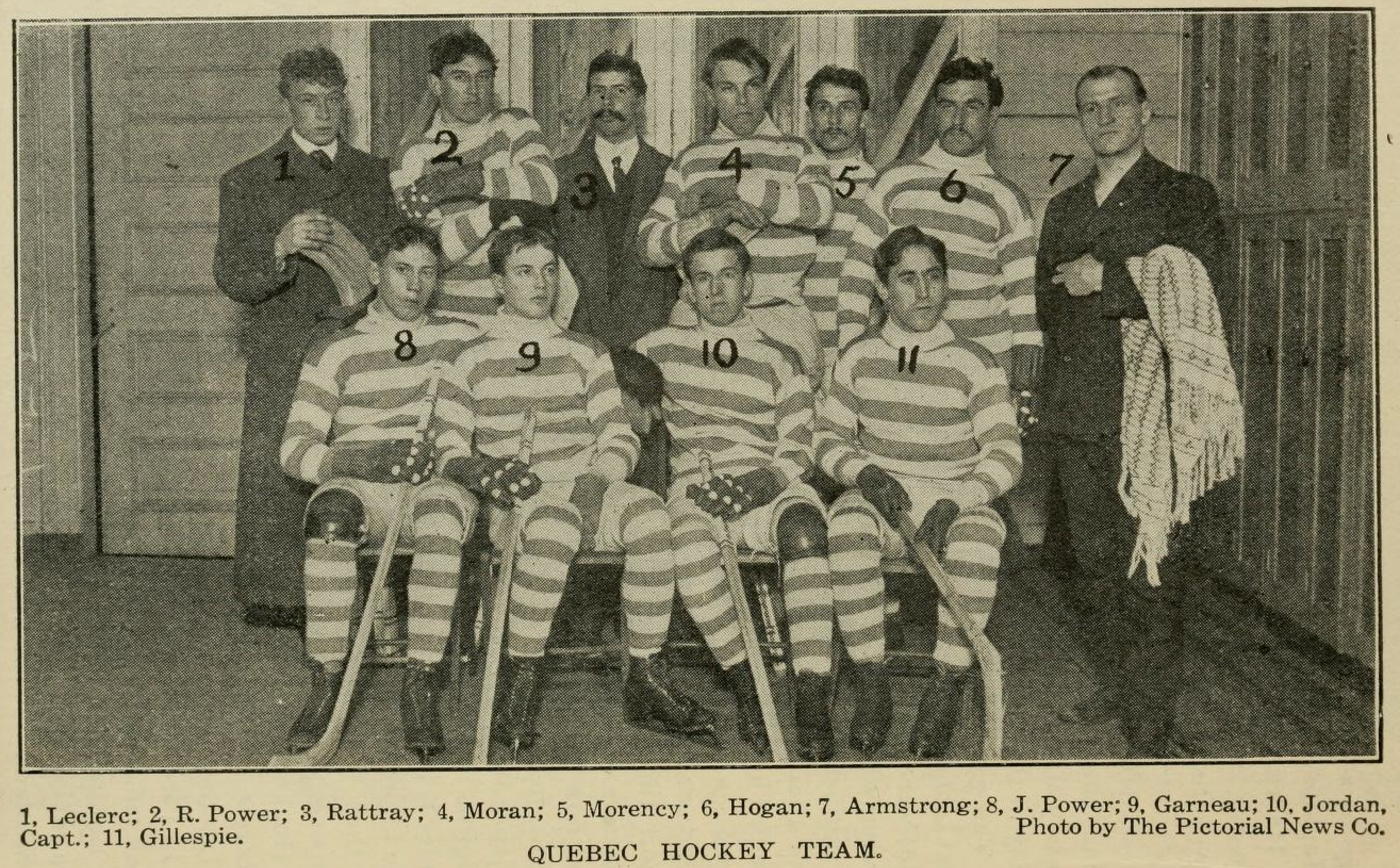
Hogan (6) standing at the right with the 1905–06 Quebec Hockey Club.

Ed Hogan played with the star-studded Renfrew Creamery Kings (colloquially dubbed the "Millionaires" due to the hefty salaries of several of its players) of the National Hockey Association, in the 1909–10 season. He also played with his hometown Quebec Hockey Club of the Canadian Amateur Hockey League (CAHL), Eastern Canada Amateur Hockey Association (ECAHA) and Canadian Hockey Association (CHA) from 1899 to 1906, 1907–08, and 1909–10.

He spent the 1906–07 season with the Pittsburgh Professionals of the IHL.
