= Riley Hern =

Canadian ice hockey player (1878–1929)

- Hockey Hall of Fame, 1963
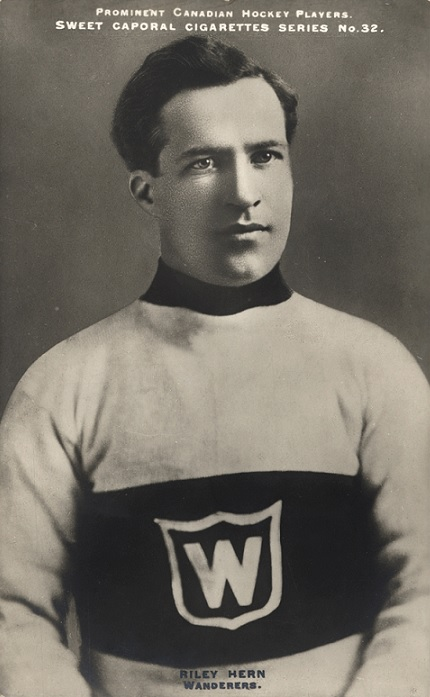
- Hern in 1910
- Born: December 5, 1878 St. Marys, Ontario, Canada
- Died: June 24, 1929 (aged 50) Montreal, Quebec, Canada
- Height: 5 ft 9 in (175 cm)
- Weight: 170 lb (77 kg; 12 st 2 lb)
- Position: Goaltender
- Caught: Left
- Played for: Pittsburgh Keystones (WPHL); Portage Lakes (IPHL); Montreal Wanderers (ECAHA/NHA)
- Playing career: 1898–1911

William Milton "Riley" Hern (December 5, 1878 – June 24, 1929) was a Canadian professional ice hockey goaltender. He was the first professional goaltender to play on a Stanley Cup-winning team.

== Biography ==
Hern began playing ice hockey at an early age, playing for school teams in St. Marys and Stratford, playing both as a goaltender and a forward. Hern played for Stratford Legionnaires from 1898 to 1901.

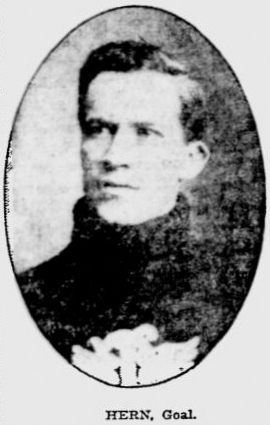
Hern with Portage Lakes HC.

He began his professional career with the Pittsburgh Keystones of the Western Pennsylvania Hockey League (WPHL) during the 1901–02 season. In his first season, Hern led the league in wins, with nine in 14 games. Hern, as a result, was named to the WPHL All-Star Team. However, in the next season, he led the league in losses, losing 10 out of 11 games. In the 1904–05 season, Hern played with the Portage Lakes Hockey Club of the International Professional Hockey League (IPHL). He played, in total, three seasons with Portage Lakes.

In the 1906–07 season, Hern joined the Montreal Wanderers of the Eastern Canadian Amateur Hockey Association (ECAHA). Hern posted a 10–0 regular season record in his first season with the Wanderers. The Wanderers won the Stanley Cup four times, three straight seasons, from 1906 to 1908, and in 1910. The Wanderers also successfully defended the Cup in six out of seven challenges in that time span. The only challenge they lost was against the Kenora Thistles in January 1907; the Wanderers reclaimed the Cup in their own successful challenge two months later.

Hern retired from playing professional ice hockey in 1911, at the age of 30. Hern went on to become a successful businessman, owning a haberdashery in Montreal. He was involved in organizing various ice hockey leagues and printing schedules. Hern also served as an NHL referee and a goal judge.

Hern died at Ross Memorial Pavilion of a heart ailment that had been ailing him for six weeks on June 24, 1929. He was inducted posthumously into the Hockey Hall of Fame in 1963.

Hern's grandson is Allan F. Nicholls, who played the role of Charlestown Chiefs captain Johnny Upton in the 1977 film Slap Shot.

Riley Hern is regarded by some as being among the best goaltenders of all time, coming in at 25th overall according to veteran hockey writers Kevin Allen and Bob Duff in their 2002 book Without Fear: Hockey's 50 Greatest Goaltenders.

== Career statistics ==
=== Regular season ===
Season	Team	League	GP	W	L	T	MIN	GA	SO	GAA
1901–02	Pittsburgh Keystones	WPHL	19	14	5	0	780	40	2	3.08
1902–03	Pittsburgh Keystones	WPHL	12	1	10	0	460	61	0	7.96
1903–04	Portage Lakes	Exhib.	14	13	1	0	840	21	4	1.50
1903–04	Portage Lakes	W-S	2	2	0	0	120	6	0	3.00
1904–05	Portage Lakes	IPHL	24	15	7	2	1374	81	2	3.54
1905–06	Portage Lakes	IPHL	20	15	5	0	1215	70	1	3.46
1906–07	Montreal Wanderers	ECAHA	10	10	0	0	610	39	0	3.84
1907–08	Montreal Wanderers	ECAHA	10	8	2	0	610	52	0	5.11
1908–09	Montreal Wanderers	ECHA	12	9	3	0	728	61	0	5.03
1909–10	Montreal Wanderers	NHA	13	12	1	0	780	47	1	3.62
1910–11	Montreal Wanderers	NHA	16	7	9	0	973	88	0	5.43
ECAHA/ECHA totals			32	27	5	0	1948	152	0	4.68
NHA totals			29	19	10	0	1753	135	1	4.62

=== Playoffs ===
Season	Team	League	GP	W	L	T	MIN	GA	SO	GAA
1901–02	Pittsburgh Keystones	WPHL	1	1	0	0	40	1	1	1.50
1906–07	Montreal Wanderers	St-Cup	6	3	3	0	360	25	0	4.17
1907–08	Montreal Wanderers	St-Cup	5	5	0	0	300	16	0	3.20
1908–09	Montreal Wanderers	St-Cup	2	1	1	0	120	10	0	5.00
1909–10	Montreal Wanderers	St-Cup	1	1	0	0	60	3	0	3.00
St-Cup totals			14	10	4	0	840	54	0	3.86
