= Herb Jordan =

Canadian ice hockey player

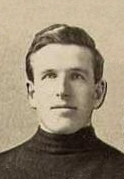
- Born: October 23, 1884; Quebec City, Quebec, Canada
- Died: June 2, 1973 (aged 88); Ottawa, Ontario, Canada
- Height: 5 ft 6 in (168 cm)
- Weight: 130 lb (59 kg; 9 st 4 lb)
- Position: Centre
- Shot: Left
- Played for: Renfrew Millionaires (NHA); Quebec Bulldogs (CAHL, ECAHA)
- Playing career: 1900–1912

Herbert Arthur Jordan (October 23, 1884 – June 2, 1973) was a Canadian amateur and later professional ice hockey player, at the centre forward position, most notably for the Quebec Bulldogs and the Renfrew Millionaires.

== Playing career ==
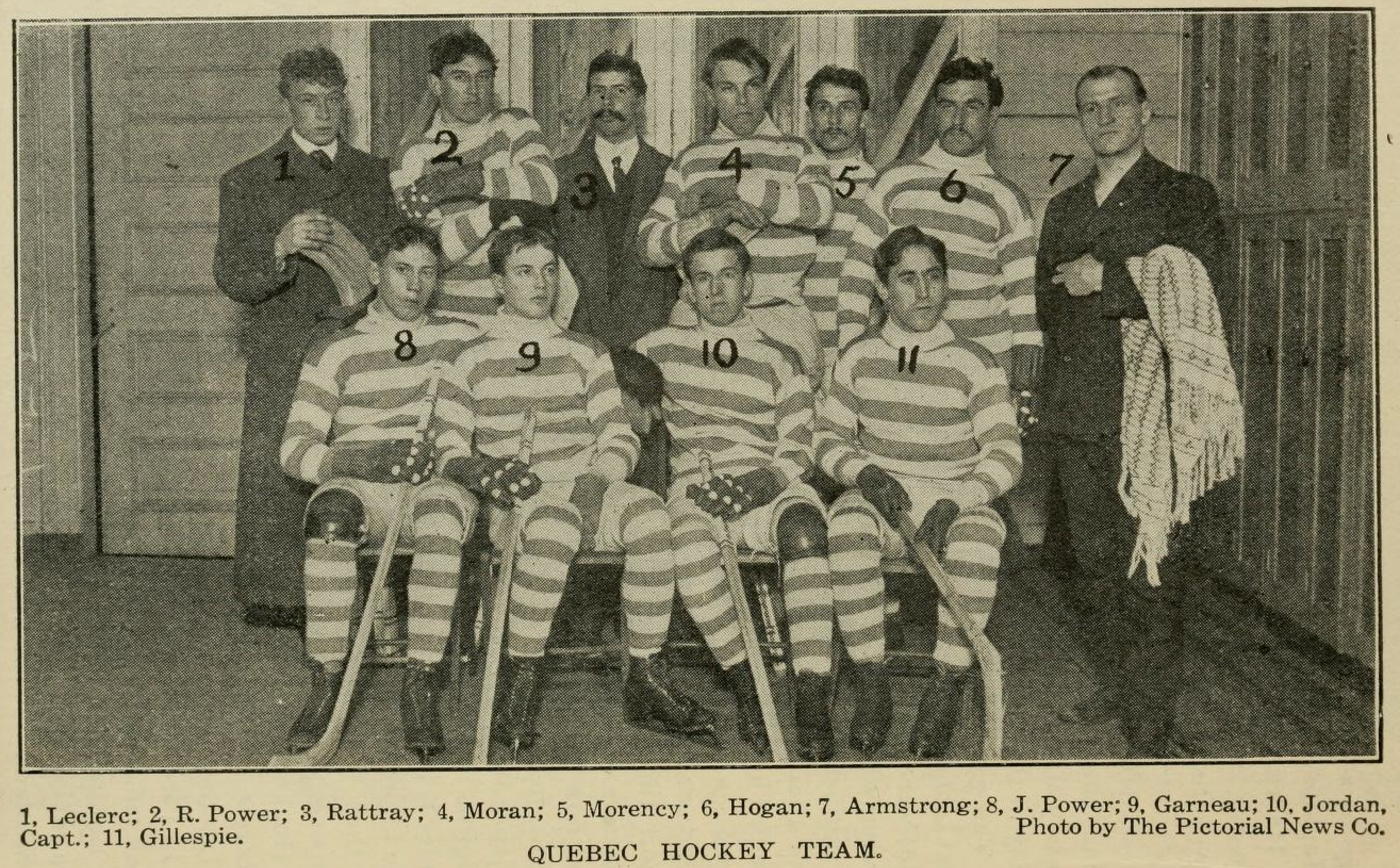
Jordan (10) in the front row with the 1905–06 Quebec Hockey Club.

Born in Quebec City, Quebec, Jordan made his way up to the Quebec Crescents of the Canadian Amateur Hockey League (CAHL) intermediates in 1900. He joined the Quebec Hockey Club of the CAHL seniors in 1902, and played for the organization until 1909, becoming a professional player in 1908–09 as the team and league (by then the Eastern Canada Amateur Hockey Association (ECAHA)) became professional. He then played two seasons for the star-studded Renfrew Creamery Kings (dubbed the Millionaires) before retiring after the 1910 season when the Renfrew NHA team ceased operations.

He was a good scorer, and his best season was 1908–09, when he scored 30 goals in 12 games.
