= Sam Lichtenhein =

American-Canadian businessman and sports executive

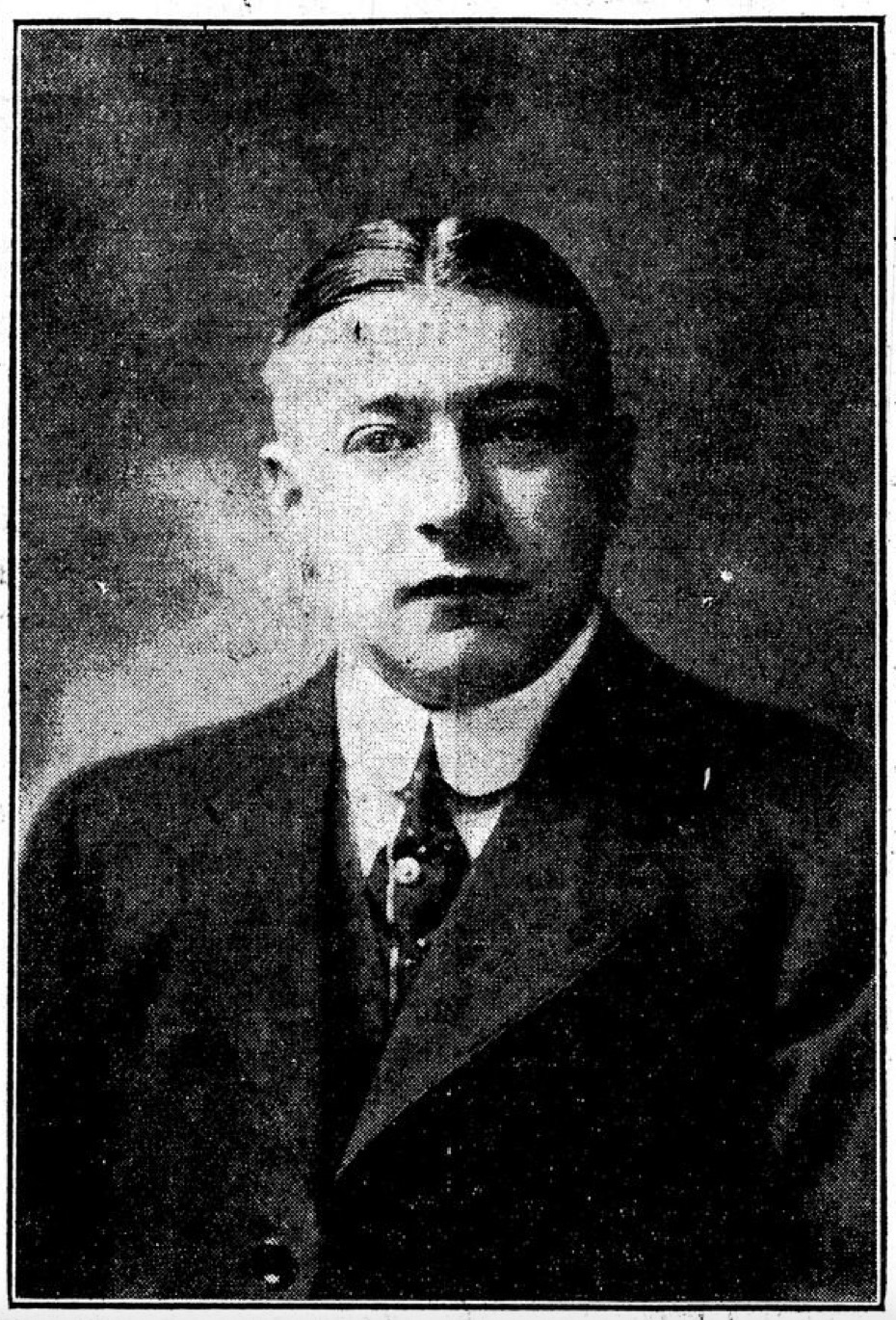
- Lichtenhein c. 1913
- Born: Samuel Edward Lichtenhein; October 24, 1870; Chicago, Illinois, U.S.
- Died: June 21, 1936 (aged 65); Montreal, Quebec, Canada
- Known for: Sports team owner

Samuel Edward Lichtenhein (October 24, 1870 – June 21, 1936) was an American-Canadian businessman and sports executive. He was the owner and president of the Montreal Wanderers ice hockey team of the National Hockey Association (NHA), later National Hockey League (NHL). As such, he was one of the founders of the NHL. He also owned the minor league Montreal Royals baseball team.

== Personal life ==
Lichtenhein was born in Chicago, Illinois, as one of four children - two boys and two girls. The family moved to Montreal after the Chicago fire of 1871 destroyed his parents' business. He attended Loyola College and later became a successful businessman. He was president of Cotton and Wool Waste of Montreal and International Wool Waste Co. of Boston at his death. He married Huldah Lewin and they had one son. Lichtenhein died after a six-month illness at this home at 3540 Mountain Street. He was interred at Mount Royal Cemetery.

== Sports career ==
Lichtenhein was the owner of two Montreal sports teams. He bought the Montreal Royals baseball team in 1910, which upon its revival became the Brooklyn Dodgers' principal farm team. It folded in 1917. Lichtenhein bought a share of the Montreal Wanderers from Eddie McCaffery in December 1910, and became its president.

World War I came in 1914, and the Wanderers team declined. Lichtenhein had trouble icing a full team as players enlisted to fight. This was compounded in 1917 when Lichtenhein and the other NHA owners folded the league and founded the NHL. Lichtenhein demanded that the other owners contribute players to his team. Finally, the end came after the Montreal Arena, home of the Wanderers and the rival Montreal Canadiens, burned down on January 2, 1918. Lichtenheim folded the club a few days later, after his demands for players were not met. Lichtenhein cited losses of over $30,000 in 1918 due to the fire. Lichtenhein was later quoted as stating that he lost over $150,000 in the last five years of owning the Royals and Wanderers.

Lichtenhein was essential in changing ice hockey from a seven-man to a six-man game. The change was proposed at a meeting of the NHA. To pass, it required the approval of every owner. Initially, Lichtenhein was opposed to the move. He was convinced to agree to change after a fellow owner pointed out that he would have to pay one less salary. In 1917, he led the campaign to kick Eddie Livingstone and his Toronto Blueshirts out of the NHA for "unethical business practices". The NHA owners then founded the NHL, leaving Livingstone without a league. The move led to years of legal wrangles for the NHL.

Lichtenhein suffered four fires during his lifetime. One of his father's department stores was destroyed in the 1871 Great Chicago Fire, after which the family moved to Montreal. As well as the fire that destroyed the Wanderers' arena, fires twice destroyed ballparks of the Royals. Another fire destroyed one of his businesses.
