= 1909 ECHA season =

Ice hockey season

- League: Eastern Canada Hockey Association
- Sport: Ice hockey
- Duration: January 2 – March 6, 1909
- Teams: 4

1909
- Champions: Ottawa Hockey Club
- Top scorer: Marty Walsh (38 goals)

ECAHA seasons
- ← 1907–08 1909–10 (CHA); 1910 (NHA) →

The 1909 ECHA season was the fourth and final season of the Eastern Canada Hockey Association (ECHA). Teams played a twelve-game schedule. The Ottawa Hockey Club would win the league championship with a record of ten wins, two losses and take over the Stanley Cup.

== League business ==
=== Executive ===
- Joe Power, Quebec (president)
- James Strachan, Wanderers (1st vice-president)
- J. Eveleigh, Montreal (2nd vice-president)
- Emmett Quinn, Quebec (secretary-treasurer)

The Eastern Canada Amateur Hockey Association league meeting was held November 4, 1908, and was a pivotal meeting in the evolution from amateur to professional ice hockey leagues. At the meeting the two last amateur, or at least partly amateur teams resigned over the signing of players from other teams. Montreal HC and Montreal Victorias left the league and later would continue as senior level men's teams playing for the Allan Cup. Unpaid players would no longer play with paid players.

The league would continue with four professional teams. The league name was changed to Eastern Canadian Hockey Association to reflect the change in status.

== Regular season ==
The Wanderers', Cecil Blachford had retired and Bruce Stuart had moved to Ottawa. New additions included Joe Hall, Harry Smith, Jimmy Gardner and Steve Vair. The Wanderers would come close to their rivals, finishing second with nine wins and three losses.

Ottawa saw Harvey Pulford and Alf Smith retire, and Tom Phillips leave. Ottawa would replace these players with Edgar Dey, Billy Gilmour and Albert 'Dubby' Kerr from the Toronto Professionals. Alf Smith would organize the Ottawa Senators of the Federal Hockey League.

Shamrocks added Harry Hyland, and Quebec saw the start of the career of Joe Malone.

Ottawa played an exhibition game prior to the season with the Toronto professionals on January 2 in Toronto. Toronto defeated Ottawa 5–4. Dubby Kerr played in the game for Toronto, and signed with Ottawa a week later.

On January 25, Wanderers played an exhibition game in Cobalt, Ontario, versus the Cobalt Silver Kings, betting $500 on themselves to win, but lost 6–4. After the game Harry Smith would leave the Wanderers to join Haileybury of the Timiskaming League.

=== Highlights ===
The rivalry between Ottawa and Wanderers continued, Wanderers winning the first on January 6 7–6 in overtime, with Harry Smith scoring four against his former team. Ottawa would win the next 5–4 in Ottawa, and defeat Montreal in Montreal 9–8 before 8000 fans. Ottawa would finish the series winning 8–3 in Ottawa to clinch the championship.

Marty Walsh of Ottawa would win the scoring championship with 38 goals. Ottawa would average nearly ten goals per game.

=== Final standing ===
Note GP = Games played, W = Wins, L = Losses, T = Ties, GF = Goals for, GA = Goals against

Team	GP	W	L	T	GF	GA
Ottawa HC	12	10	2	0	117	63
Montreal Wanderers	12	9	3	0	82	61
Quebec HC	12	3	9	0	78	106
Montreal Shamrocks	12	2	10	0	56	103

=== Results ===
Month	Day	Visitor	Score	Home	Score
Jan.	2	Quebec HC	8	Shamrocks	9
Jan.	6	Shamrocks	4	Quebec HC	12
Jan.	6	Ottawa HC	6	Wanderers	7 (OT 7'40")
Jan.	9	Quebec HC	5	Ottawa HC	13
Jan.	13	Ottawa HC	11	Shamrocks	3
Jan.	13	Wanderers	7	Quebec HC	3
Jan.	16	Shamrocks	7	Ottawa HC	9
Jan.	16	Quebec HC	6	Wanderers	7
Jan.	20	Shamrocks	5	Wanderers	7
Jan.	23	Ottawa HC	18	Quebec HC	4
Jan.	27	Shamrocks	1	Wanderers	5
Jan.	30	Wanderers	4	Ottawa HC	5
Jan.	30	Quebec HC	4	Shamrocks	8
Feb.	6	Ottawa	9	Wanderers	8
Feb.	6	Shamrocks	6	Quebec HC	9
Feb.	10	Shamrocks	6	Wanderers	8
Feb.	13	Quebec HC	6	Ottawa HC	14
Feb.	17	Wanderers	12	Shamrocks	2
Feb.	20	Ottawa HC	7	Shamrocks	3
Feb.	20	Wanderers	7	Quebec HC	4
Feb.	27	Shamrocks	2	Ottawa HC	11
Feb.	27	Quebec HC	6	Wanderers	7
Mar.	4	Wanderers	3	Ottawa HC	8
Mar.	7	Ottawa HC	6	Quebec HC	11

== Player statistics ==
=== Scoring leaders ===
Note: GP = Games played, G = Goals scored

Name	Club	GP	G
Marty Walsh	Ottawa HC	12	38
Herb Jordan	Quebec HC	12	29
Bruce Stuart	Ottawa HC	11	22
Charles Power	Quebec HC	12	22
Albert Kerr	Ottawa HC	9	20
Harry Hyland	Shamrocks	11	18
Frank "Pud" Glass	Wanderers	12	17
Steve Vair	Wanderers	7	12
Billy Gilmour	Ottawa HC	11	11
Jimmy Gardner	Wanderers	12	11

=== Goaltending averages ===
Note: GP = Games played, GA = Goals against, SO = Shutouts, GAA = Goals against average

Name	Club	GP	GA	SO	GAA
Riley Hern	Wanderers	12	61		5.1
Percy LeSueur	Ottawa HC	12	63		5.3
Bill Baker	Shamrocks	12	103		8.6
Paddy Moran	Quebec HC	12	106		8.8

== Stanley Cup challenges ==
=== Montreal vs. Edmonton ===
Prior to the season, Wanderers would play a challenge against the Edmonton Hockey Club, champions of the Alberta Amateur Hockey Association. Despite all players except for one being a 'ringer' for Edmonton, Montreal would defeat them December 28–30, 1908, in Montreal. In game one, Harry Smith scored 5 goals as he led the Wanderers to a 7–3 victory. The Edmontons won game two, 7–6, but Montreal took the two-game total goals series, 13–10.

Date	Winning team	Score	Losing team	Location
December 28, 1908	Montreal Wanderers	7–3	Edmonton HC	Montreal Arena
December 30, 1908	Edmonton HC	7–6	Montreal Wanderers	Montreal Arena
Montreal wins total goals series 13 goals to 10

December 28, 1908
Edmonton HC	3		Montreal Wanderers	7
Bert Lindsay		G	William "Riley" Hern	
Lester Patrick		P	Art Ross	
Didier Pitre		CP	Walter Smaill	
Fred Whitcroft	1	R	Harry Smith	5
Steve Vair	1	C	Frank "Pud' Glass Capt	2
Harold McNamara		RW	Ernie "Moose" Johnson	
Tommy Phillips	1	LW	Jimmy Gardner	
Referees – Frank Patrick & Russell Bowie

- Spares Edmonton: Bert Boulton, Harold Deeton, Jack “Hay” Miller
- Spares Montreal: Ernie Liffton, Ernie Russell.

December 30, 1908
Edmonton HC	7		Montreal Wanderers	6
Bert Lindsay		G	William "Riley" Hern	
Lester Patrick	1	P	Art Ross	
Didier Pitre		CP	Walter Smaill	1
Fred Whitcroft	1	R	Harry Smith	1
Harold Deeton	3	C	Frank "Pud' Glass Capt	3
Jack "Hay" Millar	2	RW	Ernie "Moose" Johnson	1
Steve Vair	1	LW	Jimmy Gardner	
Referees – Frank Patrick & Russell Bowie

- Spares Edmonton: Bert Boulton, Howard McNamara, Tommy Phillips.
- Spares Montreal: Ernie Liffiton, Ernie Russell.

Source: Coleman

After the challenge, Edmonton would play an exhibition game in Ottawa on January 2, defeating the Ottawa Senators (of the FHL) 4–2. Ottawa played the Toronto Pros the same day in Toronto, losing 5–4. Lindsay, Pitre and Vair, having played with Edmonton for the challenge, would sign after the exhibition game with Renfrew of the Federal League. The players would help Renfrew to the FHL championship.

After the season, Ottawa took over the Cup, but a series against the Winnipeg Shamrocks could not be arranged and no challenge was played. (The Shamrocks would fold before the next season and never played a challenge series.) Challenges from Renfrew of the Federal Hockey League and Cobalt of the Timiskaming League were disallowed when the Stanley Cup trustees ruled that the players on Renfrew and Cobalt were ineligible, having joined their teams after January 2.

=== Post-season exhibition ===
Ottawa and the Montreal Wanderers played a two-game series at the St. Nicholas Rink in New York on March 12 and March 13. Ottawa won the first game 6–4, and the second game was tied 8–8.

== Stanley Cup engraving ==
1909 Ottawa Hockey Club
Players
Forwards
Albert "Dubbie" Kerr (left winger)
Hamilton Billy Gilmour (right winger-rover)
Bruce Stuart (rover – captain) (center)
Marty Walsh (center)
Defencemen
Fred Lake(point)
Fred "Cyclone" Taylor (cover point)
Edgar Dey Jr.(cover point-right wing-rover)
Horace Merrill (did not play on the team picture)
Goaltender
Percy LeSueur

non-players =

- Thomas D'Arcy McGee (president), Llewellyn Bates (vice president)
- Pete Green (coach), Patrick Basketville (treasurer)
- Martin Rosenthal (secretary), Mac McGilton (trainer)
- Charles Sparks, George Bryson, Dave Mulligan (directors)
- Percy Butler, S.N. Nagle (unknown first name) (directors)

all-notes =

- There are two team pictures, one including only players, which is reproduced in Coleman, p. 177. The other includes all the players and executives, Podnieks, Page 41.

engraving-notes =

- Ottawa added a new ring to the bottom of the Stanley Cup and put their name on it.

== See also ==
- 1909 FHL season
- List of pre-NHL seasons
- List of ice hockey leagues
- List of Stanley Cup champions

Preceded by Montreal Wanderers; 1908	Ottawa HC; Stanley Cup Champions; 1909	Succeeded by Ottawa HC; January 1910
Preceded by 1908 ECAHA season	ECAHA seasons 1909	Succeeded by 1909–10 CHA season 1910 NHA season
