= Harry Manson (ice hockey) =

Canadian ice hockey player

- Born: January 21, 1885 Mille Roches, Ontario, Canada
- Died: November 8, 1940 (aged 55)
- Played for: Ottawa Victorias; Guelph Royals; Toronto Pros; Waterloo Colts; Port Hope Professionals; Montreal Wanderers
- Playing career: 1906–1912

Howard "Harry" Manson (January 21, 1885 – November 8, 1940) was a Canadian professional ice hockey player. Manson played professionally with Cornwall, Ontario, Galt, Ontario, Ottawa Victorias, Toronto Pros, Waterloo Colts, Port Hope Professionals and Montreal Wanderers.

== Career ==
Born in Mille Roches, Ontario, Manson first played professionally for the local Cornwall Hockey Club in the Federal Amateur Hockey League (FAHL) in 1906–07. He played one further season with Cornwall, and subbed in a Stanley Cup challenge for the Ottawa Victorias. In 1908–09, Manson played one game with Cornwall, then joined the Guelph Royals, followed by the Toronto Pros after Guelph disbanded. In 1909–10, Manson started the season with the Waterloo Colts, before joining Galt for two regular season games and a Stanley Cup challenge. In 1910–11, Manson stayed with the Port Hope Professionals of the Eastern Ontario Professional Hockey League all season. Manson played one game for the Montreal Wanderers in the 1911–12 season to end his professional career.

== Personal life ==
The 1911 Canadian census lists Manson's professions as "carpenter" and "hockey player".
