= James Strachan (ice hockey) =

Canadian ice hockey executive and businessman

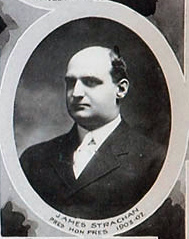
James Strachan in 1908

James Frederick Strachan (June 21, 1876 – April 5, 1939) was a Canadian ice hockey executive and businessman. He was an owner or part-owner with the Montreal Wanderers and Montreal Maroons.

== Hockey career ==
Strachan was the owner and president of the Montreal Wanderers from 1904 to 1909, during which the Wanderers won 3 of their 4 Stanley Cups in 1906, 1907, and 1908. In 1908–09, he also served as their head coach. He sold the club to P. J. Doran in 1909. The sale eventually led to the formation of the National Hockey Association (NHA) when Doran relocated the Wanderers to the Jubilee Rink. The Rink was smaller than the Wanderers' previous rink, the Montreal Arena, and the other Eastern Canada Hockey League members formed a new ice hockey league to remove the Wanderers. The Wanderers then formed their league (the NHA) in partnership with Ambrose O'Brien. The ECHA's new league failed, and some of the teams joined the NHA.

Strachan later served as the first president of the Montreal Maroons ice hockey club. Strachan intended for the Maroons to be a revival of the Wanderers, but he could not secure a clear title to the name. The original Wanderers had folded in 1918 after a fire at the Montreal Arena. Lacking a name, the club was dubbed the 'Maroons' after the colour of their jerseys. In their second season, the Maroons won the Stanley Cup championship in 1926. Strachan served as Maroons' president from their founding in 1924 until June 1934, when he resigned to take care of his businesses.

James Strachan's younger brothers, Billy and Bert Strachan, were both ice hockey players with the Montreal Victorias and the Montreal Wanderers. James Strachan died on April 5, 1939, after a lengthy illness at the age of 62.
