= Montreal Wanderers =

Ice hockey team

- Founded: 1903
- History: Montreal Wanderers; 1903–1918; 1903–1905 (FAHL); 1906–1909 (ECAHA); 1910–1917 (NHA); 1917–1918 (NHL)
- Home arena: Montreal Arena (1903–1910); Jubilee Arena (1910); Montreal Arena (1910–1918)
- City: Montreal, Quebec
- Team colours: Red, white
- Owner(s): James Strachan (1903–1908); P. J. Doran (1908–1910); Sam Lichtenhein (1910–1918)
- Stanley Cups: 4 (1906, 1907, 1908, 1910)

The Montreal Wanderers were an amateur, and later professional, ice hockey team based in Montreal. The team played in the Federal Amateur Hockey League (FAHL), the Eastern Canada Amateur Hockey Association (ECAHA), the National Hockey Association (NHA) and briefly the National Hockey League (NHL). The Wanderers were four-time Stanley Cup winners. Prior to the formation of the NHL, the "Redbands" were one of the most successful teams in ice hockey.

== History ==
James Strachan announced the formation of the new club on December 1, 1903. The team was founded on December 3, when club members met and selected their colours as red and white and named their officers – George Hodge as honorary president, Clarence D. McKerrow as honorary vice president, James Strachan as president, George Guile as vice president, and Tom Hodge as secretary.

The club had formed over a dispute over the control of the Montreal Hockey Club. Along with teams rejected for membership in the Canadian Amateur Hockey League (CAHL), the team helped found the Federal Amateur Hockey League (FAHL) on December 5. Many of the early Wanderers had been members of the 1902–03 Montreal Hockey Club team, which won the Stanley Cup. That team had been known as the "Little Men of Iron", because of the players' tenacity and small stature, and the nickname carried over to the new club.

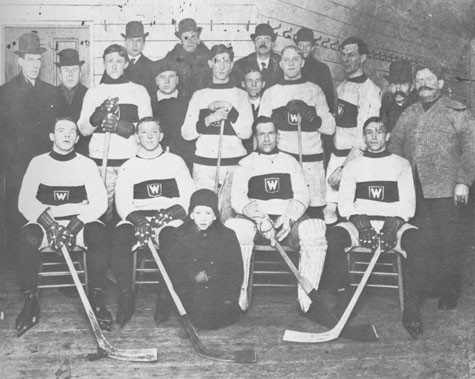
The 1907 Montreal Wanderers team

The Wanderers' first Stanley Cup challenge was played against the Ottawa Hockey Club on March 2, 1904, resulting in a 5–5 tie game. The Wanderers refused to continue the series unless the tie was replayed in Montreal, and forfeited the series. This was the start of a terrific rivalry as Ottawa and the Wanderers would split the championship between them from 1903 until 1911. Ottawa and the Wanderers would meet again in 1906, after a regular season tie for first place in the Eastern Canada Amateur Hockey Association (ECAHA), and played a two-game, total-goals series for the league championship and the Stanley Cup. The Wanderers won the first game in Montreal 9–1. The "Silver Seven" would storm back in the return match in Ottawa, with a 9–1 lead at one point in the game evening the total goals, but only won 9–3 as the Wanderers scored the last two goals, to win the series, and their first Stanley Cup.

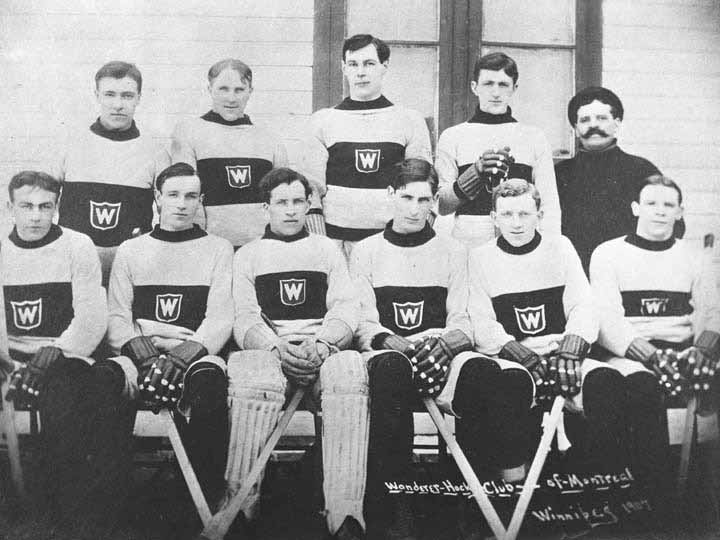
Wanderers players and team officials in Winnipeg for 1907 Stanley Cup challenge

Montreal defended the Stanley Cup in its first challenge as champions in December 1906. The Wanderers defeated the New Glasgow Cubs 17–5 in a two-game, total-goals series. They repeated as league champions in 1907, then faced the Kenora Thistles in a Stanley Cup challenge in January 1907. Kenora defeated Montreal 4–2 and 8–6, taking the trophy back to Northern Ontario. The Wanderers would regain the Stanley Cup from Kenora two months later in Winnipeg, defeating the Thistles 7–2 and 5–6.

The Wanderers won their third consecutive league title in 1907–08, while defending the Stanley Cup in a mid-season challenge by the Ottawa Victorias in January. After their third consecutive ECAHA title, the Wanderers were given its trophy, the Arena Cup permanently. The Arena Cup is on display in the Hockey Hall of Fame in Toronto.

After the 1907–08 regular season, Montreal defended the Stanley Cup twice in March 1908, in challenges by the Winnipeg Maple Leafs, and the Toronto Professional Hockey Club. The 1907–08 Wanderers team scratched their names inside the bowl, which was just prior to the second band being added to the Cup. The team included five future honoured members of the Hockey Hall of Fame – Moose Johnson, Hod Stuart, Riley Hern, Lester Patrick, and Ernie Russell.

Before the 1909 season started, Montreal defended the Stanley Cup in a challenge by the Edmonton Hockey Club, winning 13–10 in two games. The Wanderers lost the Cup they had held for two years, finishing second place in the ECAHA to Ottawa.

As a side note, the Montreal Wanderers practiced at the Victoria Skating Rink in 1903 and early 1904 before moving their practices to the Montagnard Stadium (The Daily Witness, December 9, 1903). Their home rink for games was the Montreal Arena.

=== National Hockey Association ===
The Wanderers were involved in the formation of the National Hockey Association (NHA). After the 1908 season, the Wanderers had been sold to P. J. Doran, owner of the Jubilee Rink, who now made plans to move the club from the Montreal Arena to the smaller Jubilee Rink for the 1910 season. This upset the other members of the Eastern Canada Hockey Association (ECHA), who would receive a smaller share of the proceeds from games played in the Wanderers rink. The other ECHA members suspended the ECHA and set up the Canadian Hockey Association (CHA) league and rejected the application of the Wanderers to join. The Wanderers' representative at the meeting Jimmy Gardner met Ambrose O'Brien in the ground floor of the hotel where the league was meeting. Gardner suggested to O'Brien, who had been rejected in his application for the Renfrew Creamery Kings to join the ECHA, that they form a new league, including the Wanderers, Renfrew, the Cobalt Silver Kings and the Haileybury Hockey Club teams that O'Brien owned. O'Brien agreed and on December 4, 1909, the NHA was founded. Later in January 1910, the CHA folded and Ottawa and Montreal Shamrocks joined the NHA.

Doran sold the club to Eddie McCafferty, the secretary of the Montreal Royals minor league baseball team, owned by Sam Lichtenhein. McCafferty incorporated the Wanderers and sold shares of the club to the public. The majority of shares were bought by Lichtenhein, and he became president of the club's corporation. The club moved back to the Montreal Arena.

The Wanderers regained the Stanley Cup in 1910, winning the 1910 championship of the new NHA and the new O'Brien Cup. The Wanderers successfully defended the Stanley Cup for the final time versus the Berlin Dutchmen in March 1910. Montreal fell to fourth place the following season, and lost the privilege to defend the Stanley Cup. The Wanderers would then miss the playoffs for four consecutive seasons. Montreal's last winning season came in 1914–15, when they tied for first place and lost in a playoff series for the league championship. The Wanderers would win only 15 of their next 44 games in two seasons, before the NHA was reorganized as the National Hockey League (NHL).

=== The NHL and the team's demise ===
The Wanderers played only four games in the NHL's inaugural season and lost all but one game before their home rink, the Montreal Arena, burned down on January 2, 1918. At the time, they had lost star players Sprague Cleghorn and Odie Cleghorn and had appealed to the other teams for player help. Before the fire, they had successfully obtained goaltender Hap Holmes from the Seattle Metropolitans of the Pacific Coast Hockey Association (PCHA) and it seemed that they might turn around their misfortunes. After the fire, the Wanderers again appealed for reinforcements, but none were forthcoming. The team defaulted its next two games, against the Montreal Canadiens and Toronto, and then disbanded.

The last active Wanderers player was George Geran, who played his last NHL game in 1926. Dave Ritchie and Phil Stevens also played that season, but not the full year.

After the founding of the Montreal Canadiens, a team that specifically appealed to Montreal's French-speaking community, the Wanderers drew their support from Montreal's English-speaking community. A new team, the Montreal Maroons, was later established to take the Wanderers' place. The owners originally intended to use the name Wanderers, but were unable to obtain rights to the name. The Maroons, too, would eventually suspend operations in 1938, ending efforts to entrench separate Montreal-based teams for French- and English-speaking fans.

== Nickname ==
The Wanderers' nickname was the namesake of several earlier Montreal teams. These teams each only lasted one year throughout the latter portion of the 19th century. The first had played in the Montreal Winter Carnival ice hockey tournament in 1884. Another was an independent team that played various challenges in 1893. A third played in the Independent Amateur Hockey League in 1895, while a fourth played in the Cyclists Interclub Hockey League in 1897.

== Early Stanley Cup dominance ==
The Wanderers were created in December 1903, played their first league game the following month, won their first league championship the next month, and challenged the Ottawa "Silver Seven/Senators" Hockey Club (HC) for the Stanley Cup on March 2, 1904.

While they lost that first challenge, it marked the start of a period of eight consecutive years through March 5, 1912, where these two teams would co-exist and either the Montreal Wanderers (1,390 days) or the Ottawa HC (1,474 days) would hold the Stanley Cup. Only the Kenora Thistles, for 61 days in 1907 (January 23 through March 25), would impinge on these two teams.

The Wanderers won or defended the Cup 10 times in their first seven years of existence, and lost only two direct challenges (to Ottawa in March 1904, and to Kenora in January 1907) during that period.

== Season-by-season record ==
- 1904–1905 – Federal Amateur Hockey League (FAHL)
- 1906–1908 – Eastern Canada Amateur Hockey Association (ECAHA)
- 1909 – Eastern Canada Hockey Association (ECHA)
- 1910–1917 – National Hockey Association (NHA)
- 1917–1918 – National Hockey League (NHL)

Note: GP = Games played, W = Wins, L = Losses, T = Ties, Pts = Points, GF = Goals for, GA = Goals against

Season	GP	W	L	T	Pts	GF	GA	Finish	Postseason
1904	6	6	0	0	12	38	18	1st, FAHL	Forfeit in Stanley Cup challenge (March 1904, Ottawa Senators)
1904–05	8	6	2	0	12	44	27	2nd, FAHL	Did not qualify
1906	10	9	1	0	18	74	38	1st, ECAHA	Won Stanley Cup (March 1906, Ottawa Senators); Won Stanley Cup challenge (December 1906, New Glasgow Cubs)
1907	10	10	0	0	20	105	39	1st, ECAHA	Lost Stanley Cup challenge (January 1907, Kenora Thistles); ECAHA league champions Won Stanley Cup challenge (March 1907, Kenora Thistles)
1907–08	10	8	2	0	16	63	52	1st, ECAHA	Won Stanley Cup challenge (January 1908, Ottawa Victorias); Won Stanley Cup challenge (March 1908, Winnipeg Maple Leafs); Won Stanley Cup challenge (March 1908, Toronto Trolley Leaguers); Held Stanley Cup as league champions
1909	12	9	3	0	18	82	61	2nd, ECHA	Won Stanley Cup challenge (December 1908, Edmonton Hockey Club); Lost Stanley Cup by placing second in league play
1910	12	11	1	0	22	91	41	1st, NHA	Won O'Brien Cup and Stanley Cup (NHA season champions); Won Stanley Cup challenge (March 1910, Berlin Dutchmen)
1910–11	16	7	9	0	14	73	88	4th, NHA	Did not qualify
1911–12	18	9	9	0	18	95	96	3rd, NHA	Did not qualify
1912–13	20	10	10	0	20	93	90	2nd, NHA	Did not qualify
1913–14	20	7	13	0	14	102	125	5th, NHA	Did not qualify
1914–15	20	14	6	0	28	127	82	1st (tie), NHA	Lost in playoff to Ottawa Senators
1915–16	24	10	14	0	20	90	116	5th, NHA	Did not qualify
1916–17 (Note: First half of the 1916–17 NHA season.)	10	3	7	0	6	56	72	5th, NHA	Did not qualify
1916–17 (Note: Second half of the 1916–17 NHA season.)	10	2	8	0	4	38	65	4th, NHA	Did not qualify
1917–18 (Note: Suspended operations in first half of the 1917–18 NHL season.)	6	1	5	0	2	17	35	—	Suspended operations after 6 games
Totals	212	122	90	0	244	1,188	1,045		4 Stanley Cup titles

== Head coaches ==
- Dickie Boon, 1910)
- Jimmy Gardner, 1910–1911
- Dickie Boon, 1911–1917
- Art Ross, 1917–1918

== Honoured players ==
The following Hockey Hall of Fame players played for the Wanderers during some point in their careers:

- Dickie Boon
- Harry Cameron
- Sprague Cleghorn
- Jimmy Gardner
- Joe Hall
- Riley Hern
- Tom Hooper
- Harry Hyland
- Ernie "Moose" Johnson
- Jack Marshall
- Lester Patrick
- Gordon Roberts
- Art Ross
- Ernie Russell
- Bruce Stuart
- Hod Stuart

== See also ==
- List of Stanley Cup champions
- Montreal Canadiens
- Montreal Maroons
- List of defunct NHL teams
- List of NHL players
- List of NHL seasons
- National Hockey Association
