= Eastern Canada Amateur Hockey Association =

Canadian amateur ice hockey association

- Sport: Ice hockey
- Founded: December 11, 1905 (120 years ago)
- First season: 1906
- Folded: November 25, 1909 (116 years ago)
- Country: Canada
- Last champion: Ottawa Hockey Club (1909)
- Most titles: Montreal Wanderers (3)

The Eastern Canada Amateur Hockey Association (ECAHA) was a men's amateur – later professional – ice hockey league in Canada that played four seasons. It was founded on December 11, 1905 with the top clubs from two other leagues: four from the Canadian Amateur Hockey League (CAHL) and two from the Federal Amateur Hockey League (FAHL). It was formed to maximize the revenues of a now popular spectator sport and help these amateur teams cope with professionalism in the sport. The league shed its amateur status for the 1908 season, leading to the split between Canadian amateur ice hockey teams playing for the Allan Cup, and the professionals playing for the Stanley Cup. The league dissolved in 1909 over a dispute between team owners over business issues.

== History ==
Founding

The CAHL held its regular meeting on December 9, 1905. At that meeting it was decided that amalgamation with the FAHL should be attempted, and was completed on December 11, forming a new league, the ECAHA. The CAHL was discontinued, but the FAHL continued. The first executive was elected:

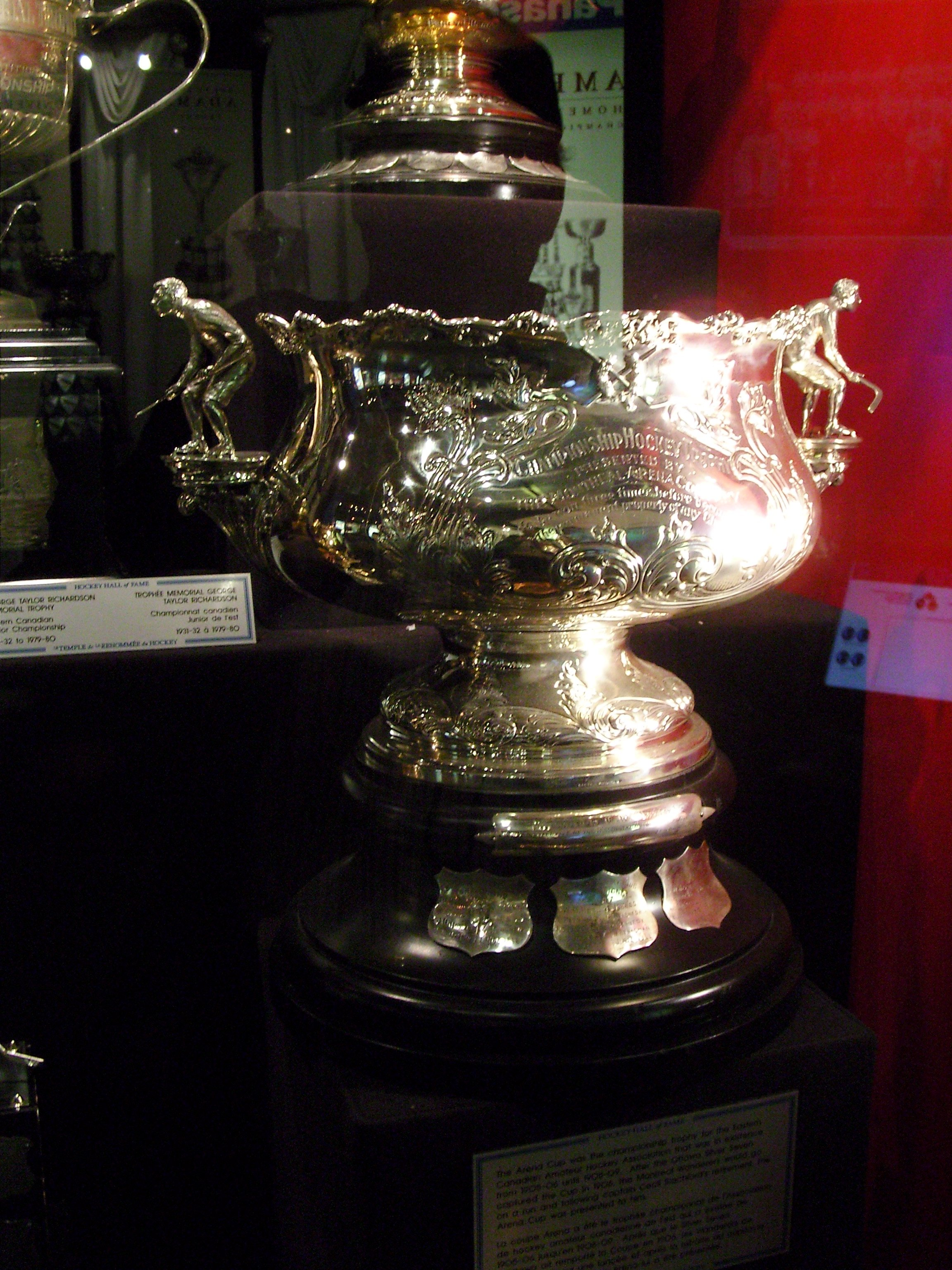
Championship trophy of the ECAHA

- Howard Wilson, Montreal (president)
- G. P. Murphy, Ottawa (1st vice-president)
- Dr. Cameron, Montreal (2nd vice-president)
- James Strachan, Wanderers ( Secretary-treasurer)

However, on December 20, the vice-president titles were abolished and the Secretary-treasurer position was given to William Northey of the Montreal Arena Company.

From the start, the league allowed teams to openly use professional players. The players who were professionals had to be printed publicly. In 1908, the amateur-only Montreal Victorias and Montreal Hockey Club teams left the league. The league became a professional-only league, leading to several amateurs retiring from their teams. In significance of the change the league was renamed the Eastern Canada Hockey Association.

In November 1909, the league dissolved over the plans of the Wanderers to move to an arena with fewer (revenue paying) spectator seats. The three other teams announced that they were leaving the ECHA, creating the Canadian Hockey Association (CHA). The Wanderers helped form a competing league, the National Hockey Association (NHA). The CHA played for less than two weeks, merging with the NHA in January 1910.

=== Arena Cup ===
A silver championship trophy, designated the 'Arena Cup', was donated by the Montreal Arena Company. It was crafted from 90 ounces (2.6 kg) of sterling silver and designed by Birk's of Montreal. After the Wanderers won it in 1906 through 1908, they were given the trophy permanently, a condition engraved in the silver of the trophy. The trophy is now on permanent display in the Hockey Hall of Fame in Toronto.

== Teams ==
Season	Teams	Champion
1906	Montreal Hockey Club, Montreal Shamrocks, Montreal Victorias, Montreal Wanderers†^{A}, Ottawa Hockey Club†^{A}, Quebec HC	Ottawa and Wanderers tied (best record); Wanderers won two-game playoff
1907	Montreal HC, Montreal Shamrocks, Montreal Victorias, Montreal Wanderers†, Ottawa HC, Quebec HC	Wanderers (best record)
1907–08	Montreal HC, Montreal Shamrocks, Montreal Victorias, Montreal Wanderers†, Ottawa HC, Quebec HC	Wanderers (best record)
1909	Montreal Shamrocks, Montreal Wanderers, Ottawa HC†, Quebec HC	Ottawa (best record)

† Stanley Cup Champions.

^{A} - Ottawa and Wanderers are both considered 1906 Stanley Cup Champions.

== See also ==
- List of Stanley Cup champions
- List of pre-NHL seasons
- List of ice hockey leagues

== References & notes ==
=== Bibliography ===
- Coleman, Charles (1966). The Trail of the Stanley Cup, vol. 1, 1893–1926 inc.
- Kitchen, Paul (2008), Win, Tie, or Wrangle: The Inside Story of the Old Ottawa Senators 1883–1935, Manotick, Ontario: Penumbra Press, ISBN 978-1-897323-46-5
