= Gord Brydson =

Canadian ice hockey player and golfer

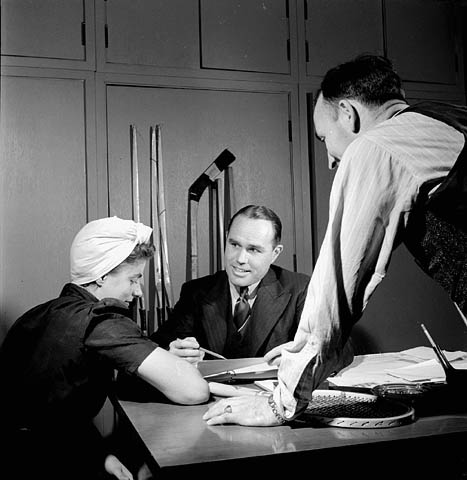
- Gord Brydson in his post as director of the Employees' Athletic and Recreation Association in Toronto, Ontario, during World War 2
- Born: January 3, 1907 Toronto, Ontario, Canada
- Died: February 4, 2001 (aged 94) Mississauga, Ontario, Canada
- Height: 5 ft 7 in (170 cm)
- Weight: 150 lb (68 kg; 10 st 10 lb)
- Position: Centre
- Shot: Right
- Played for: Toronto Maple Leafs
- Playing career: 1926–1933

Gord Brydson
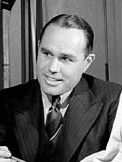

Career
- Sport: Golf
- Status: Professional
- Professional wins: 12

Achievements and awards
- Canadian Golf Hall of Fame: 1982

David James Gordon Brydson (January 3, 1907 – February 4, 2001) was a Canadian professional ice hockey centre and golf professional. Brydson played professional ice hockey from 1926 through 1933, including eight games in the National Hockey League (NHL) for the Toronto Maple Leafs during the 1929–30 season.

== Hockey career ==
Brydson made his professional debut in 1926 for Eddie Livingstone's Chicago Cardinals. He scored the first goal of the franchise in its home opener. Like several of the AHA teams, the Cardinals folded without finishing the season. The NHL did not recognize the signing of Brydson by Chicago and awarded his pro-rights to Stratford of the Can-Pro League. Stratford moved him to the Hamilton Tigers where he played the 1927–28 season. The following season he played for the Buffalo Bisons of the Can-Pro. The following season, 1929–30, Brydson made his NHL debut, playing in 14 games for the Maple Leafs. He was sent to the London Panthers for the rest of the season. He moved to the Chicago Shamrocks for two seasons and retired after the 1932–33 season which he played with the Detroit Olympics.

== Golf career ==
Brydson was also an accomplished golfer and after ending his hockey career went on to enjoy many successes as a professional, highlighted by winning the Canadian PGA Championship in 1944 and 1948. He also won the Millar Trophy twice, the provincial opens of Ontario and Quebec, and represented Canada in the Hopkins Trophy on four occasions. He was associated with the Mississaugua Golf & Country Club, then of Toronto Township, Ontario. In recognition of his achievements, he was inducted into the Canadian Golf Hall of Fame in 1982. He had also been inducted into the halls of fame of the PGA of Canada and Ontario Golf.

== Golfing achievements ==
=== Tournament wins ===
- 1930 Ontario Open
- 1937 Millar Trophy
- 1941 Quebec Open
- 1944 Canadian PGA Championship, Ontario Open
- 1948 Canadian PGA Championship
- 1953 Millar Trophy
- 1960 PGA of Canada Seniors Championship
- 1962 Ontario Seniors PGA Championship
- 1963 Ontario Seniors PGA Championship
- 1964 Ontario Seniors PGA Championship
- 1965 Ontario Seniors PGA Championship

=== Team appearances ===
- Hopkins Trophy (representing Canada): 1952, 1954, 1955, 1956

== Career statistics ==
=== Regular season and playoffs ===
| | | | Regular season | | | | | Playoffs |
| Season | Team | League | GP | G | A | Pts | PIM | GP | G | A | Pts | PIM |
|---|---|---|---|---|---|---|---|---|---|---|---|---|
| 1923–24 | Toronto Canoe Club | OHA | 8 | 1 | 3 | 4 | 8 | — | — | — | — | — |
| 1924–25 | Toronto Canoe Club | OHA | 8 | 11 | 8 | 19 | — | 2 | 1 | 1 | 2 | — |
| 1925–26 | Toronto Canoe Club | OHA | 9 | 13 | 2 | 15 | — | — | — | — | — | — |
| 1925–26 | Toronto Canoe Club | OHA Sr | 1 | 0 | 0 | 0 | 0 | — | — | — | — | — |
| 1926–27 | Chicago Cardinals | AHA | 32 | 10 | 3 | 13 | 23 | — | — | — | — | — |
| 1927–28 | Hamilton Tigers | Can-Pro | 42 | 30 | 3 | 33 | 59 | — | — | — | — | — |
| 1928–29 | Buffalo Bisons | Can-Pro | 42 | 18 | 5 | 23 | 42 | — | — | — | — | — |
| 1929–30 | Toronto Maple Leafs | NHL | 8 | 2 | 0 | 2 | 0 | — | — | — | — | — |
| 1929–30 | London Panthers | IHL | 32 | 18 | 8 | 26 | 8 | 2 | 1 | 0 | 1 | 2 |
| 1930–31 | Chicago Shamrocks | AHA | 47 | 35 | 12 | 47 | 54 | — | — | — | — | — |
| 1931–32 | Chicago Shamrocks | AHA | 46 | 9 | 9 | 18 | 35 | 3 | 2 | 1 | 3 | 0 |
| 1932–33 | Detroit Olympics | IHL | 41 | 4 | 14 | 18 | 57 | — | — | — | — | — |
| AHA totals | | | 125 | 54 | 24 | 78 | 112 | 3 | 2 | 1 | 3 | 0 |
| NHL totals | | | 8 | 2 | 0 | 2 | 8 | — | — | — | — | — |
