= Frank Calder =

Canadian ice hockey administrator

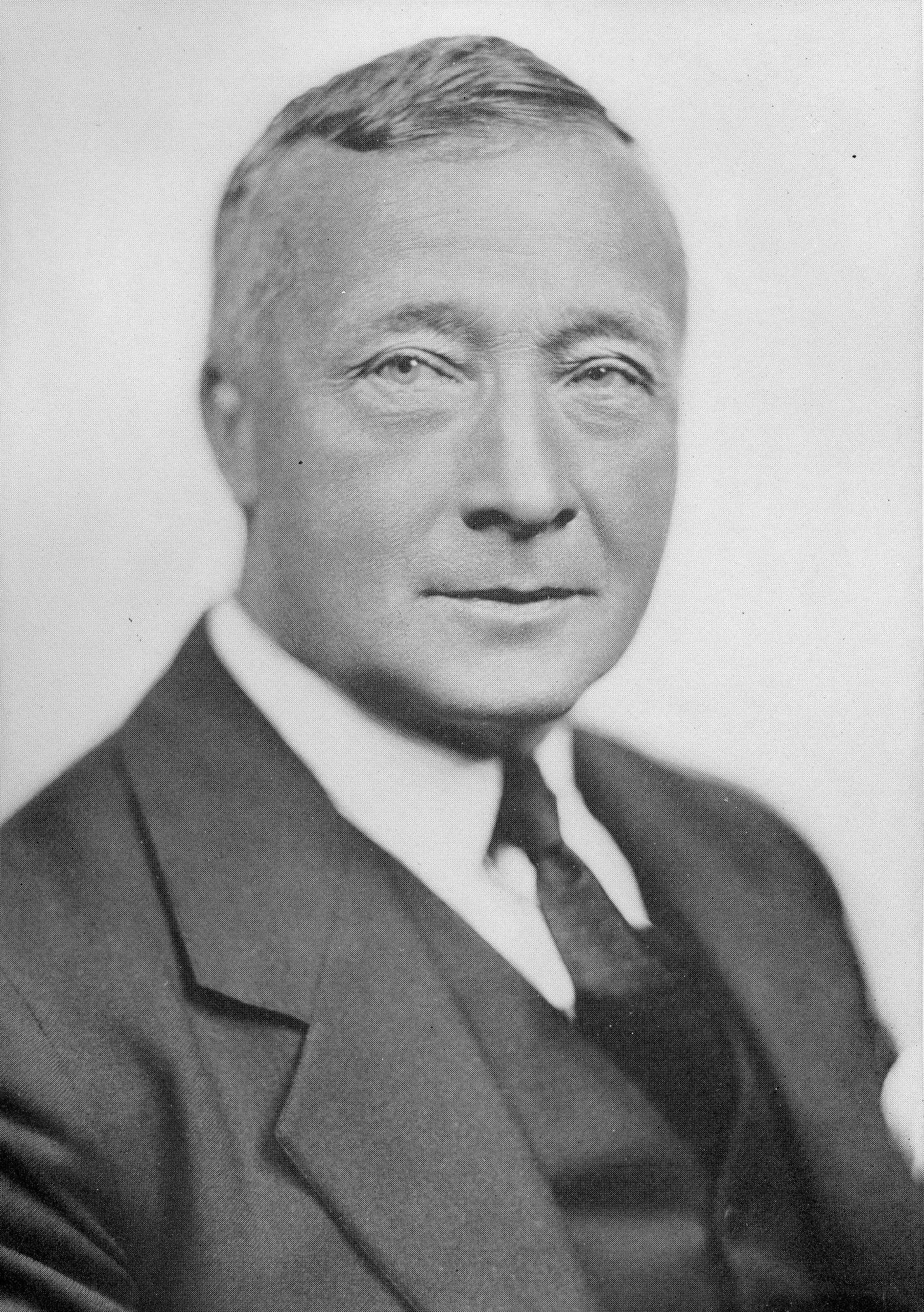

1st President of the National Hockey League
- In office 1917–1943
- Succeeded by: Red Dutton

Personal details
- Born: November 17, 1877 Bristol, England
- Died: February 4, 1943 (aged 65) Montreal, Quebec, Canada

Frank Sellick Calder (November 17, 1877 – February 4, 1943) was a British-born Canadian ice hockey executive, journalist, and athlete.

Calder was the first president of the National Hockey League (NHL), from 1917 until his death in 1943. He also served as the last acting president of the NHL's predecessor league, the National Hockey Association (NHA), and was instrumental in the transition from the NHA to the NHL, a transition made to expel a franchise owner. He presided over the expansion of the NHL from Canada into the United States, while at the same time fending off rivals to the NHL's status as the premier North American ice hockey league.

== Early life ==
Calder was born to Scottish parents in Bristol, England. He participated in many English sports as a youth, including rugby, cricket, handball, golf, and soccer. As a young man, he immigrated to Canada and became a teacher at a private school. Before leaving the United Kingdom, he flipped a coin to decide whether he should immigrate to Canada or to the United States.

He married a fellow teacher, Amelia Cole, and they had three sons and one daughter.

== Early career ==
Calder worked as a sports editor at the Montreal Witness. From there, he moved to the Montreal Herald and Daily Telegraph. After that, he passed the role of sports editor to Elmer Ferguson so that he could move on to take the financial editor's chair, in which capacity he covered the Montreal Stock Exchange, Canada's largest stock market at the time. He maintained his interest in sports, creating the Montreal School Rugby League. He was the secretary-treasurer of the Montreal Football (Soccer) Association in 1903 and remained in that position until at least 1911, when he represented the organization at the time of the founding of the Province of Quebec Football (Soccer) Association. He was elected a member of the executive committee of the PQFA in 1911 and 1912. Earlier he was a referee and had refereed the game between the Montreal All-Stars and the touring Corinthians from England in 1906.

== National Hockey Association ==
On November 15, 1914, Calder was appointed secretary-treasurer of the National Hockey Association (NHA).

In 1917, the NHA owners decided to drop Eddie Livingstone's Toronto Blueshirts franchise and took his players. Frank Robinson, seeing he was as powerless as his predecessor Emmett Quinn was resigned as NHA president. At the time, Calder was the secretary-treasurer when Frank Robinson resigned as president of the NHA in 1917. Calder, the league secretary, saw an opportunity in the situation. He decided that the NHA owners allied against Livingstone needed someone to represent them, and, in effect, Calder was—at least for all practical purposes—the new president of the NHA. He arranged meetings between the NHA's owners to figure out how to get rid of Livingstone, and decided to form a new league.

== National Hockey League ==
The National Hockey League, in the NHA's place. Calder was elected president of the new league, which was officially established on November 26, 1917.

Calder wielded his power as president with authority. One example of this authority occurred during the Hamilton Tigers strike in 1925. Rather than negotiate with the players, he suspended and fined them each $200.

In 1926, Calder first arranged a co-operation agreement with the new American Hockey Association (AHA), then broke it upon learning that Livingstone owned the Chicago Cardinals franchise. He declared that several Cardinals players belonged to the NHL's Chicago franchise (the Black Hawks), or other teams, and arranged for the ouster of Livingstone from the AHA. Livingstone would give up on professional hockey and return to amateur hockey. When the AHA later attempted to play for the Stanley Cup, Calder declared it an "outlaw league," but he happily accepted James E. Norris, who owned the AHA's Chicago Shamrocks, into the NHL to bail out the struggling Detroit Cougars franchise. The Cougars were renamed the Detroit Red Wings upon Norris' acquisition of them.

Calder was adamant that minorities would not be restricted from participation in the NHL. During the 1927–28 season, upon hearing of the Boston Black Panthers, the first all-Black hockey team in the United States, he was reported to have remarked that, "Pro hockey has no ruling against the colored man, nor is it likely to ever draw the line," a reference to the segregation in baseball.

Only one attempt to remove Calder as president of the NHL was made. This was in 1932–33, when Black Hawks owner Frederic McLaughlin circulated a letter to the NHL Board of Governors to remove him. The board rejected the motion.

Commencing with the 1932–33 season, Calder named the top rookie in the NHL. Starting in 1936–37, he convinced the NHL's Board of Governors to let him buy a trophy to give annually to the league's top rookie, and he did this until 1941–42. After Calder's death, the trophy was made permanent as the Calder Memorial Trophy.

Calder received a silver service in 1937–38 for his 20 years as president of the NHL.

=== Professional–amateur relations ===
In February 1938, Calder terminated the NHL's agreement with the Canadian Amateur Hockey Association (CAHA) which governed signing of amateur players. He met with W. G. Hardy of the CAHA after a player suspended by the NHL was registered by a CAHA team. The differences were not resolved and Calder told NHL teams that they could approach any junior player with a contract offer. A new agreement was reached in August 1938, where the CAHA agreed not to allow international transfers for players on NHL reserve lists, and the NHL agreed not to sign any junior players without permission. It stipulated that both organizations use the same playing rules, and recognize each other's suspensions. Hardy then represented the CAHA at the joint rules committee to draft uniform rules with the NHL. A new professional-amateur agreement was signed by Calder in October 1940 to reimburse amateur teams for developing NHL players, and also applied to players sent to the Eastern Amateur Hockey League. The agreement included allowing the NHL to sign a limited number of junior age players. By January 1941, both Calder and Hardy agreed the organizations were at a "perfect understanding" and were co-operating closely.

== Death ==
Calder was presiding over a meeting of the NHL's Board of Governors on January 25, 1943, when he suffered a heart attack, followed by another in a Toronto hospital. On February 3 he felt well enough to travel and returned to Montreal the next day. However, he checked into Montreal General Hospital upon arrival and suffered another, fatal heart attack soon after. He is interred in the Mount Royal Cemetery in Montreal.

== Honours and legacy ==
Calder was inducted into the Hockey Hall of Fame in 1947 as a builder. Two trophies in professional hockey are named for him: the Calder Memorial Trophy, given yearly to the NHL's top rookie, and the Calder Cup, the championship trophy of the American Hockey League (AHL). Calder was also awarded the Order of Sport, marking his induction into Canada's Sports Hall of Fame in 2015.

== Bibliography ==
- Coleman, Charles (1966). The Trail of the Stanley Cup, vol. 1, 1893-1926, inc.
- Ross, J. Andrew (2015). Joining the Clubs: The Business of the National Hockey League to 1945. Syracuse University Press. ISBN 978-0-8156-3383-9.
- Holzman, Morey (2002). Deceptions and Doublecross: How the NHL Conquered Hockey. Dundurn Press. ISBN 1-55002-413-2.

Sporting positions
Preceded by Position created	National Hockey League President; 1917–1943	Succeeded by Red Dutton
