= Velocette KTT =

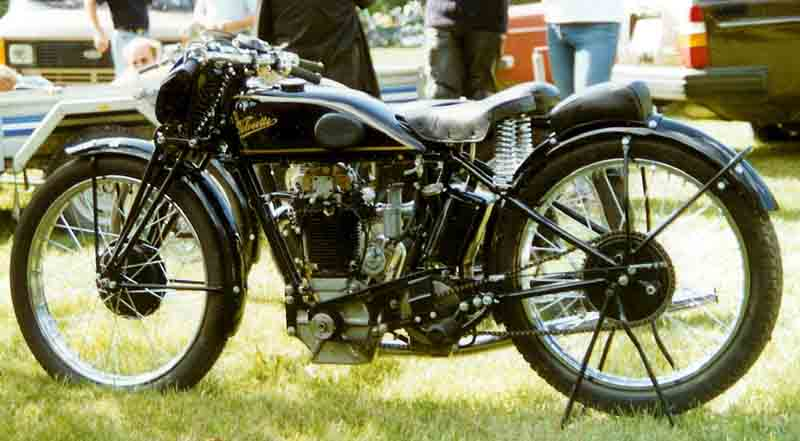
- Manufacturer: Velocette
- Production: 1929-1949
- Predecessor: Velocette KSS
- Engine: 348cc, OHC air cooled single
- Power: 20-40bhp
- Brakes: drum brakes
- Weight: Mk1 (1929-32) 265 pounds (120 kg), MkVIII (1938-50) 325 pounds (147 kg) (dry)

The Velocette KTT is a racing British motorcycle made by Veloce Ltd. The most significant variant of the Model K series of overhead camshaft Velocette motorcycles, the TT designation indicated the machine was intended for racing, and was an early example of a 'production racer' (although KTTs could be ordered as road-legal machines). The Velocette KTT was notable for having the first positive-stop foot gear change on a motorcycle, and one of the first with a swingarm rear suspension using separate sprung suspension units, although the Danish Nimbus pioneered this arrangement in 1919. The foot shift innovation significant improvement for racing, and quickly replaced the hand gear change lever, and became the standard for almost all motorcycles to this day. Veloce's swingarm suspension also had profound and lasting effects on the motorcycle industry, and remains the standard for motorcycle rear suspension to this day.

== Development ==
Based on the Velocette KSS, the KTT was developed as a production racer specifically for the challenging Isle of Man TT course, which was the most important road race in the world at the time. A racing version of the Model K was built by Percy and Eugene Goodman, sons of the Velocette founder Johannes Gutgemann, in 1925 and after twelve months of development secured Velocette their first TT win in 1926. Alec Bennett was the winner with Gus Kuhn and Fred Povey finishing in the first nine to give the factory the team prize. Further work on KTT led to the first positive-stop foot gear change on a motorcycle in 1928. Other makers had modified the hand change for foot operation but none had designed a mechanism which could change gears up or down with a single movement, and return the shift lever to its original position. As well as being significant improvement for racing, this quickly replaced the hand gear change lever and became the standard for almost all motorcycles to this day.

The Velocette KTT went on to become one of the most successful 350cc production racing motorcycles of all time, with a host of wins in international competition. The model was continually developed in a 'Mark' series, with the first year (1929) retroactively designated the 'Mark I', and each successive year given its own 'Mark' as changes to the engine, frame, forks, wheels, etc. continued. The first significant change came in late 1935, with the Mark V KTT, which had a new full-cradle frame (replacing the previous open-bottom frame which used the engine as a stressed member, from 1929-'35), which was identical to the KSS Mk2 frame. 1936 saw a break in KTT production, as only an estimated 6 Mark VI KTT's were built, for very select riders. The Mark VI used the cast aluminum cylinder head of the KSS Mk2, the first KTT with an aluminum cylinder head.

After contracting Stanley Woods to ride for the Veloce racing team, his feedback led to changes in the KTT chassis for 1937 and the Mark VII KTT, as the engine was moved forward approx. 1.5" to give better handling. The engine had been significantly redesigned with a new aluminum cylinder head and barrel of much larger proportions, to improve cooling. The new-look engine produced significantly more power, and while only 37 Mark VII KTTs were built, they are considered among the most beautiful of the series, as well as being very successful racers.

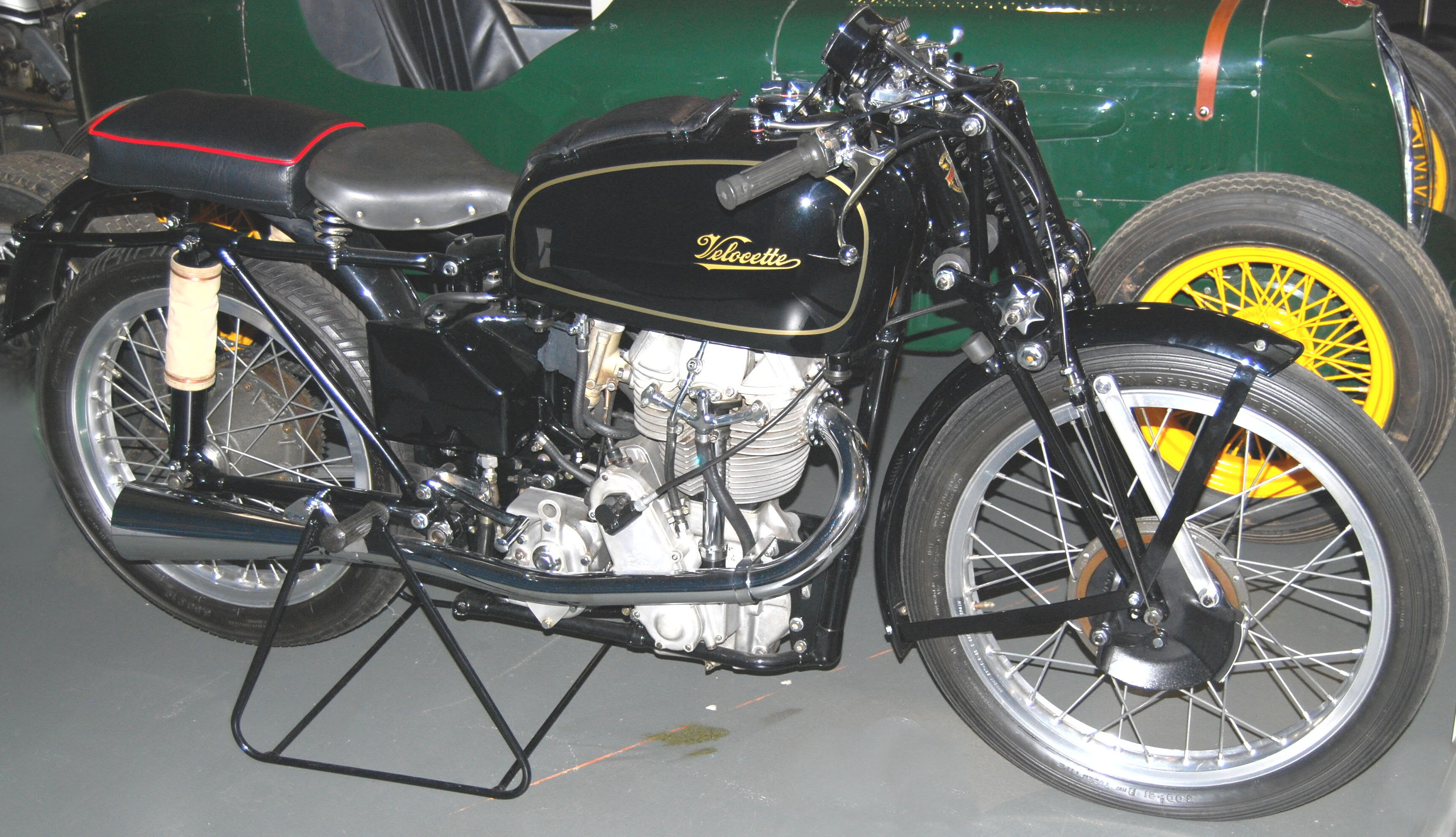
1948 KTT at a museum in Australia

Following the introduction of swingarm rear suspension on the factory race team in 1937, Veloce introduced the Mark VIII KTT in 1938, which was the first production motorcycle to use a swinging-arm rear fork with enclosed suspension units ('shocks'), although these were 'oleo pneumatic' and used air as the springing medium, and not spring/oil shocks as adopted by the motorcycle (and car) industry postwar. The system was developed by Veloce designer Harold Willis, who flew a light plane with Oleo suspension legs; he contacted the Oleo company for a special pair of air shocks, which were used by Veloce for their factory racing motorcycles from 1937 onwards, and appeared on the production KTT Mark VIII in 1938.

Production of the Velocette Mark VIII KTT ended in 1949, with around 238 models built. Around 1000 KTTs were produced in total from 1929 - 1950.

== See also ==
- Velocette
- Velocette KSS
