= T. Y. Foster =

Canadian ice hockey executive

Thomas Yates Foster
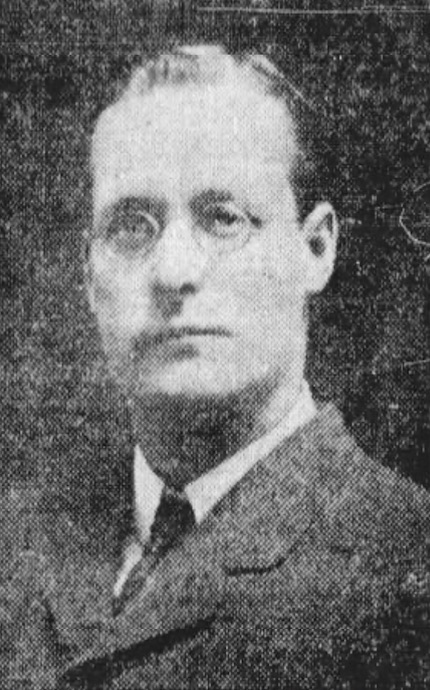

President of the National Hockey Association
- In office 1914–1914
- Preceded by: Emmett Quinn
- Succeeded by: Emmett Quinn

Personal details
- Born: April 9, 1866 Liverpool, England
- Died: June 27, 1927 (aged 61) Montreal, Canada

Thomas Yates Foster (April 9, 1866 – June 27, 1927) was a British born Canadian sports executive in Montreal, for many years serving the Montreal Amateur Athletic Association, being officially connected to the MAAA and its affiliated clubs from 1890–1908.

== NHA president ==
For seven months, between June and November of 1914, Foster was the acting president of the National Hockey Association, the predecessor league of the National Hockey League. When resigning in November of 1914, Foster cited time commitment to his business obligations as an auditor, accountant and liquidator as reasoning for stepping down. His predecessor on the post, Emmett Quinn, took over his former duties as president.

Sporting positions
Preceded by Emmett Quinn	National Hockey Association President; 1914	Succeeded by Emmett Quinn
