= Paddy Moran (ice hockey) =

Canadian ice hockey player (1877–1966)

- Hockey Hall of Fame, 1958
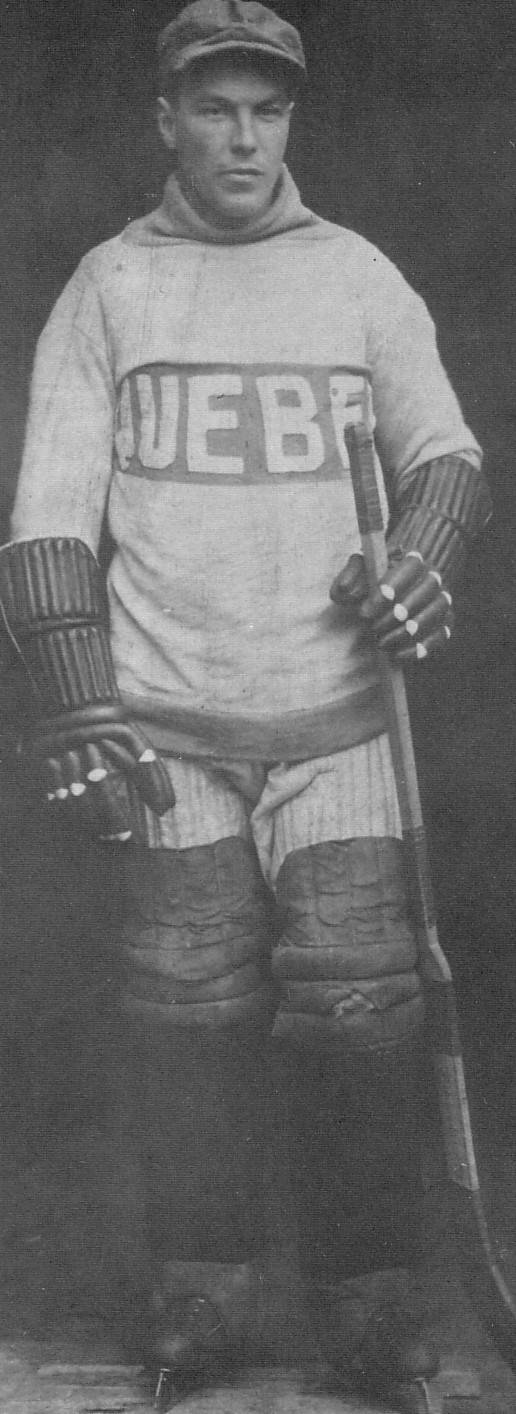
- Moran, posing in a Quebec Bulldogs sweater later in his career
- Born: March 11, 1877 Quebec City, Quebec, Canada
- Died: January 14, 1966 (aged 88) Quebec City, Quebec, Canada
- Height: 5 ft 11 in (180 cm)
- Weight: 180 lb (82 kg; 12 st 12 lb)
- Position: Goaltender
- Caught: Left
- Played for: Quebec Hockey Club; Haileybury Comets
- Playing career: 1901–1917

Patrick Joseph Alexander "Paddy" Moran (March 11, 1877 – January 14, 1966) was a Canadian professional ice hockey player. A goaltender, Moran played all but one of his 16 seasons for the Quebec Hockey Club, from 1901 to 1917; in the 1909–10 season, Moran played for the All-Montreal HC and the Haileybury Comets. Moran was noted for protecting the area in front of his net by aggressively using his stick, and expectorating at opposing players while chewing tobacco. He won two Stanley Cups with Quebec in 1912 and 1913. Moran was inducted into the Hockey Hall of Fame in 1958.

== Early life ==
Moran began playing ice hockey at the age of 15, with a local Quebec team. At age 17, Moran changed schools as his school was one of the few in Quebec City not to have an ice hockey team. At the age of 19, Moran helped his new club, the Crescents, win the Intermediate Championship.

== Playing career ==
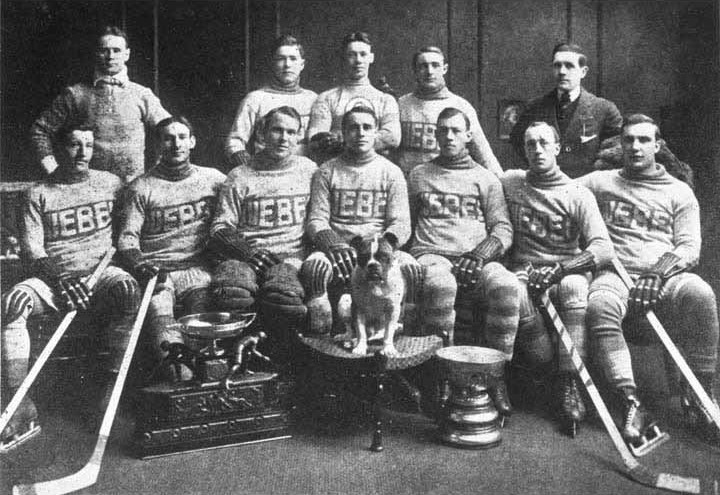
The Quebec Bulldogs team after their second consecutive Stanley Cup victory; Moran is seated third from the left, next to Joe Malone, and between the O'Brien Cup and the bulldog.

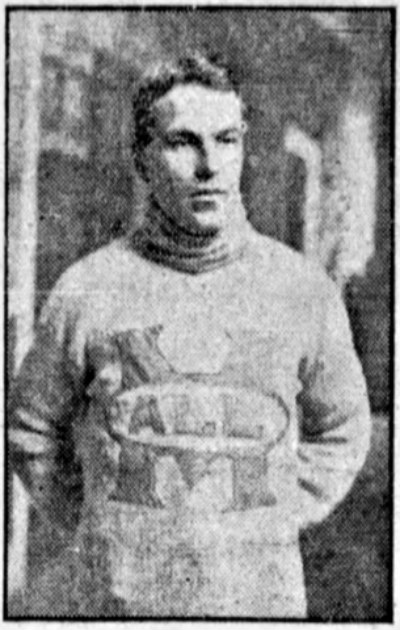
Moran with the All-Montreal HC

Moran began his playing career with the Quebec Hockey Club in the Canadian Amateur Hockey League (CAHL). Over four seasons, Moran appeared in 30 games, winning 19 of them. For the 1905–06 season, the Quebec Hockey Club joined the Eastern Canada Amateur Hockey Association (ECAHA). Over the next four years, Moran appeared in 38 games, but won only 11 of them, while his lowest goals-against average in a season during that span was 6.79. In the 1909–10 season, Moran joined the All-Montreal HC from the Canadian Hockey Association (CHA) and as the league folded, he then joined the Haileybury Comets of the National Hockey Association (NHA). In his only season with the Comets, Moran posted a 3–8 record over 11 games, letting in 79 goals.

For the 1910–11 season, Moran rejoined Quebec. That year, Quebec finished last in the league, winning only four games, and letting in 97 goals against. In the 1911–12 season, Moran went 10–8 over 18 games, with a 4.26 goals-against average. They won the O'Brien Cup and the Stanley Cup after finishing with the best record in the league. In the Stanley Cup challenge against the Moncton Victorias of the Maritime Professional Hockey League (MPHL), Quebec won the first game 9–3, and the second game 8–0. Moran finished with a 1.50 goals-against average, while Jack McDonald and Joe Malone combined for 14 out of the 17 Quebec goals as Quebec won the Stanley Cup. During the 1911–12 season Moran was also manager Art Ross' goaltender of choice for the NHA All-Stars, a team which played a series of three games against the PCHA All-Stars in British Columbia, losing two games to one.

The next season, Moran went 16–4 in the regular season in 20 games, with one shutout and a 3.70 goals-against average. Quebec repeated as O'Brien Cup winners, and had a Stanley Cup challenge once more, playing against the Sydney Miners of the MPHL. Quebec repeated as champions, winning the three-game series 2–0. In the first game, Quebec won 14–3, as Malone scored nine goals, while in the second one, Quebec emerged with a slimmer margin of victory, winning 6–2.

Moran finished his career with the Bulldogs, retiring after the NHA's last season. He played four more seasons, during which he played 69 games, winning 34 of them. Over his career, Moran's teams often had losing records, or they had a winning percentage barely over 50%. Some hockey legends often recall that he was the best goaltender of them all. He was elected to the Hall of Fame in 1958, with the help of Senator Chubby Power, once a teammate. He is still the earliest goaltender in HHOF, starting his senior hockey venture in 1901.

== Playing style ==
Moran was a stand-up style goaltender. At 5 ft 11 in (1.80 m) and 180 pounds (82 kg; 12 st 12 lb), he was considered a big goaltender for his era. In Moran's era, goaltenders were not allowed to drop down to the ice to make saves, so his style suited him well. Moran was especially noted for his aggressive defense of the area in front of his net. He used his stick to slash opposing players within reach. Moran often chewed tobacco while on the ice, and another favorite tactic of his was to expectorate at opposing players. Moran's stick work was described as attempts to "slash [other players'] heads off with lightning strokes of his blade". Moran often wore oversized sweaters, claiming that they kept him warm in the cold arenas; however, he kept it unbuttoned, and often used it to catch shots.

== Post-retirement ==
Moran retired after the 1916–17 season, at the age of 39. He was proud to have built his own house with his ice hockey earnings, which cost CAN$4,000. In 1919, Moran became a custom house builder, and continued in this career for at least 35 years. In 1944 at age 66, Moran was interviewed about his playing days, along with contemporary goaltender Percy LeSueur, who is noted for his Stanley Cup wins in 1909 and 1911 with the Ottawa Senators. Later in his life, Moran became an avid follower of the Quebec Aces. He was inducted into the Quebec Hockey Hall of Fame. In 1958, Moran was inducted into the Hockey Hall of Fame. He died on January 14, 1966.

== Statistics ==
=== Regular season ===
Season	Team	League	GP	W	L	T	MIN	GA	SO	GAA
1901–02	Quebec Hockey Club	CAHL	8	4	4	0	480	34	0	4.25
1902–03	Quebec Hockey Club	CAHL	7	3	4	0	420	46	0	6.57
1903–04	Quebec Hockey Club	CAHL	6	5	1	0	360	37	0	6.17
1904–05	Quebec Hockey Club	CAHL	9	7	2	0	540	45	0	5.00
1905–06	Quebec Hockey Club	ECAHA	10	3	7	0	619	70	0	6.79
1906–07	Quebec Hockey Club	ECAHA	6	0	6	0	362	58	0	9.61
1907–08	Quebec Hockey Club	ECAHA	10	5	5	0	602	74	0	7.38
1908–09	Quebec Hockey Club	ECHA	12	3	9	0	720	106	0	8.83
1909–10	All-Montreal HC	CHA	4	2	2	0	240	24	0	6.00
1909–10	Haileybury Comets	NHA	11	3	8	0	665	80	0	7.22
1910–11	Quebec Hockey Club	NHA	16	4	12	0	983	97	0	5.92
1911–12	Quebec Hockey Club	NHA	18	10	8	0	1099	78	0	4.26
1911–12	NHA All-Stars	Exh.	3	1	2	0	180	23	0	7.67
1912–13	Quebec Hockey Club	NHA	20	16	4	0	1215	75	1	3.70
1913–14	Quebec Hockey Club	NHA	20	12	8	0	1225	73	1	3.58
1914–15	Quebec Hockey Club	NHA	20	11	9	0	1305	85	0	3.91
1915–16	Quebec Hockey Club	NHA	22	10	10	0	1391	82	0	3.54
1916–17	Quebec Hockey Club	NHA	7	1	5	0	307	35	0	6.84
CAHL totals			30	19	11	0	1800	162	0	5.40
ECAHA/ECHA totals			38	11	27	0	2303	308	0	8.02
NHA totals			134	67	64	0	8190	605	2	4.43

=== Stanley Cup Finals ===
Season	Team	GP	W	L	T	MIN	GA	SO	GAA
1912	Quebec Bulldogs	2	2	0	0	120	3	1	1.50
1913	Quebec Bulldogs	2	2	0	0	120	5	0	2.50
SC totals		4	4	0	0	240	8	1	2.00
