= Ralph Taylor (ice hockey) =

Canadian ice hockey player (1905–1976)

- Born: October 2, 1905; Toronto, Ontario, Canada
- Died: July 3, 1976 (aged 70); St. Louis, Missouri, United States
- Height: 5 ft 9 in (175 cm)
- Weight: 180 lb (82 kg; 12 st 12 lb)
- Position: Defence
- Shot: Right
- Played for: Chicago Black Hawks; New York Rangers
- Playing career: 1926–1939

Ralph Frederick "Bouncer" Taylor (October 2, 1905 – July 3, 1976) was a Canadian professional ice hockey player who played 102 games in the National Hockey League with the Chicago Black Hawks and the New York Rangers from 1927 to 1930. The rest of his career, which lasted from 1926 to 1939, was spent in the minor leagues. He later coached the St. Louis Flyers in the American Hockey League.

== Biography ==
Taylor began his professional career in 1926 with Eddie Livingstone's Chicago Cardinals of the American Hockey Association (AHA). After the team folded in March 1927 due to the competition with the Black Hawks, Taylor moved to the Black Hawks. He played two seasons between the Black Hawks and the New York Rangers. In 1930, he became a member of the Chicago Shamrocks. He would remain in the minor leagues until his retirement in 1941. He had three sons: John Smiley Taylor, Ralph Taylor, and Bill Taylor. He also had two daughters: Marianne Taylor and Teddy Taylor.

== Career statistics ==
=== Regular season and playoffs ===
| | | | Regular season | | | | | Playoffs |
| Season | Team | League | GP | G | A | Pts | PIM | GP | G | A | Pts | PIM |
|---|---|---|---|---|---|---|---|---|---|---|---|---|
| 1923–24 | Toronto Canoe Club | OHA | 5 | 3 | 2 | 5 | 8 | — | — | — | — | — |
| 1924–25 | Toronto Canoe Club | OHA | 8 | 9 | 2 | 11 | 0 | 2 | 0 | 2 | 2 | — |
| 1925–26 | Toronto Canoe Club | OHA | 8 | 2 | 2 | 4 | — | — | — | — | — | — |
| 1926–27 | Chicago Cardinals | AHA | 29 | 4 | 1 | 5 | 57 | — | — | — | — | — |
| 1927–28 | Chicago Black Hawks | NHL | 25 | 1 | 1 | 2 | 36 | — | — | — | — | — |
| 1927–28 | Moose Jaw Maroons | PHL | 16 | 7 | 2 | 9 | 20 | — | — | — | — | — |
| 1928–29 | Chicago Black Hawks | NHL | 38 | 0 | 0 | 0 | 64 | — | — | — | — | — |
| 1928–29 | St. Louis Flyers | AHA | 8 | 2 | 0 | 2 | 14 | — | — | — | — | — |
| 1929–30 | Chicago Black Hawks | NHL | 17 | 1 | 0 | 1 | 42 | — | — | — | — | — |
| 1929–30 | New York Rangers | NHL | 22 | 2 | 0 | 2 | 32 | 4 | 0 | 0 | 0 | 10 |
| 1930–31 | Chicago Shamrocks | AHA | 34 | 6 | 6 | 12 | 68 | — | — | — | — | — |
| 1931–32 | Chicago Shamrocks | AHA | 48 | 4 | 2 | 6 | 81 | 4 | 0 | 0 | 0 | 8 |
| 1932–33 | Detroit Olympics | IHL | 35 | 4 | 3 | 7 | 62 | — | — | — | — | — |
| 1933–34 | Tulsa Oilers | AHA | 2 | 2 | 1 | 3 | 2 | — | — | — | — | — |
| 1933–34 | Kansas City Greyhounds | AHA | 46 | 4 | 6 | 10 | 47 | 3 | 2 | 1 | 3 | 10 |
| 1934–35 | Kansas City Greyhounds | AHA | 44 | 6 | 1 | 7 | 59 | 2 | 0 | 0 | 0 | 2 |
| 1935–36 | Kansas City Greyhounds | AHA | 48 | 6 | 8 | 14 | 44 | — | — | — | — | — |
| 1936–37 | Kansas City Greyhounds | AHA | 42 | 5 | 3 | 8 | 30 | 3 | 0 | 0 | 0 | 7 |
| 1936–37 | Tulsa Oilers | AHA | 1 | 0 | 0 | 0 | 0 | — | — | — | — | — |
| 1937–38 | Kansas City Greyhounds | AHA | 6 | 1 | 0 | 1 | 6 | — | — | — | — | — |
| 1937–38 | St. Louis Flyers | NHL | 21 | 0 | 1 | 1 | 14 | 7 | 0 | 0 | 0 | 6 |
| 1938–35 | St. Louis Flyers | AHA | 38 | 0 | 1 | 1 | 27 | 7 | 1 | 2 | 3 | 10 |
| AHA totals | | | 367 | 40 | 30 | 70 | 449 | 26 | 3 | 3 | 6 | 43 |
| NHL totals | | | 102 | 4 | 1 | 5 | 174 | 4 | 0 | 0 | 0 | 10 |
