= Chicago Cardinals (disambiguation) =

The Chicago Cardinals were an NFL American football team from 1920 to 1959 after which they became the St. Louis Cardinals, and since 1988 the Arizona Cardinals.

Chicago Cardinals may also refer to:

- Chicago Cardinals, Continental Indoor Football League team, played one season (2010), then became the Chicago Knights
- Chicago Cardinals (ice hockey), in the American Hockey Association, played one season (1926)
