= Jack Riley (ice hockey, born 1910) =

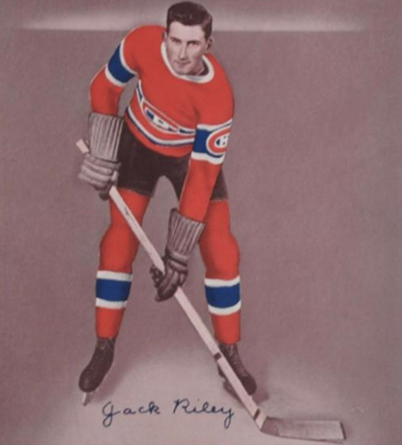
- Riley in 1934 insert for Montreal
- Born: 29 December 1910 Berckenla, Ireland
- Died: 19 January 1993 (aged 84) Vancouver, British Columbia, Canada
- Height: 5 ft 11 in (180 cm)
- Weight: 160 lb (73 kg; 11 st 6 lb)
- Position: Centre
- Shot: Left
- Played for: Montreal Canadiens; Boston Bruins
- Playing career: 1929–1945

John Joseph Riley (29 December 1910 – 19 January 1993) was an Irish-born Canadian ice hockey centre during the 1930s. He played in the National Hockey League between 1933 and 1936 with the Montreal Canadiens and Boston Bruins. The rest of his career, which lasted from 1929 to 1945, was spent in various minor leagues.

== Playing career ==
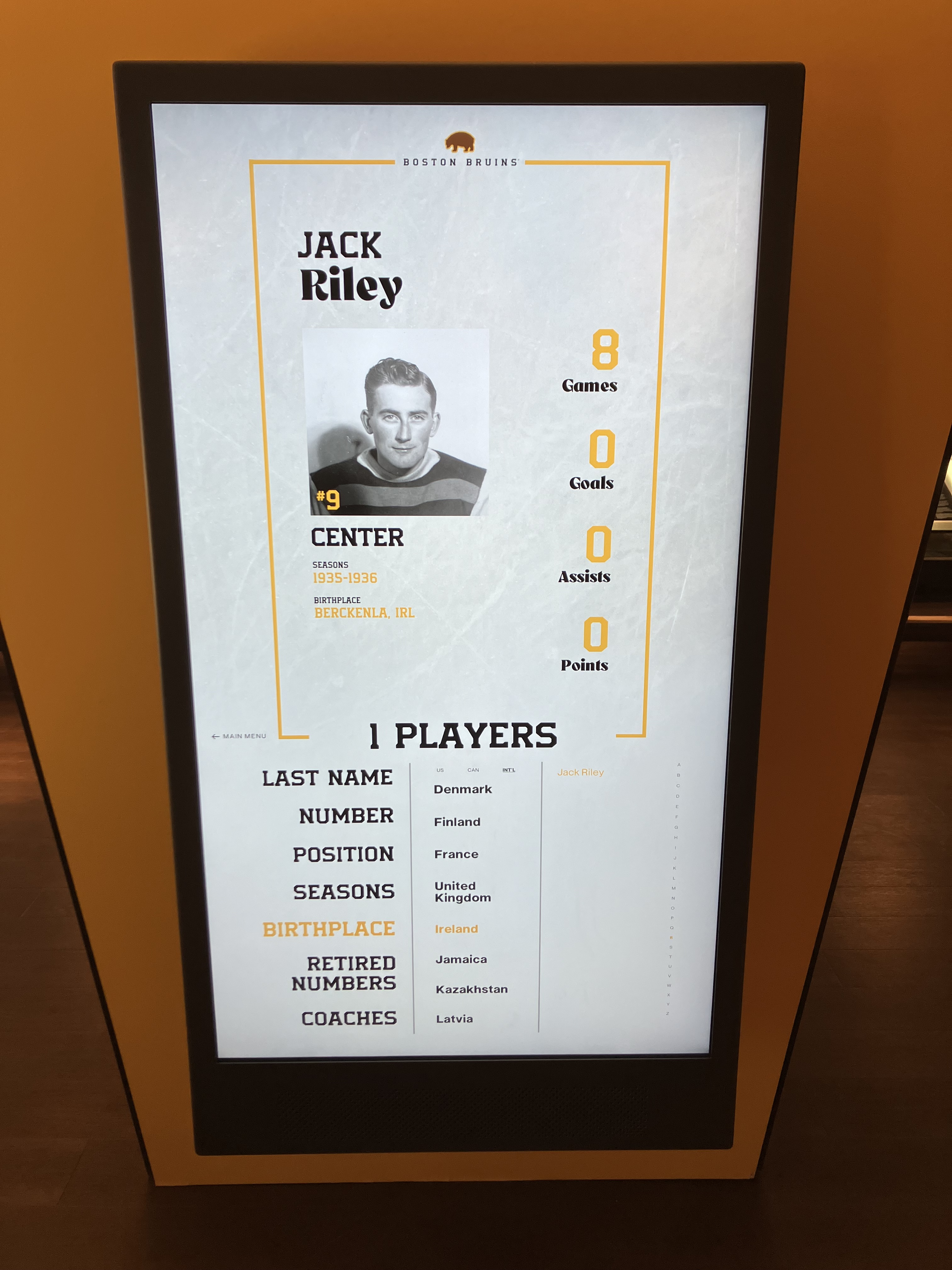
Database entry for Riley at Boston Bruins Heritage Hall, September 2024

Born in Berckenla, in the United Kingdom in 1910, Riley was raised in Calgary, Alberta, playing for the Calgary Canadians of the Calgary City Junior Hockey League. He was a member of a Memorial Cup losing side while with the Canadians.

Riley played three seasons in the NHL, with the Montreal Canadiens and Boston Bruins. Following 104 NHL games, he scored a total of 10 goals and 22 assists for 32 points, recording eight penalty minutes. He would go on to play in the AHA and lead the Tulsa Oilers in scoring during the 1936–37 season. Riley died in Vancouver in 1993.

== Career statistics ==
=== Regular season and playoffs ===
			Regular season					Playoffs
Season	Team	League	GP	G	A	Pts	PIM	GP	G	A	Pts	PIM
1926–27	Calgary Canadians	CCJHL	6	11	3	14	—	—	—	—	—	—
1926–27	Calgary Canadians	M-Cup	—	—	—	—	—	2	0	0	0	0
1927–28	Vancouver King George	VCAHL	8	5	0	5	2	3	3	0	3	0
1928–29	Calgary Canadians	CCJHL	—	—	—	—	—	—	—	—	—	—
1929–30	Seattle Eskimos	PCHL	5	0	0	0	0	—	—	—	—	—
1930–31	Chicago Shamrocks	AHA	26	6	8	14	126	—	—	—	—	—
1930–31	Minneapolis Millers	AHA	16	4	2	6	8	—	—	—	—	—
1931–32	Chicago Shamrocks	AHA	46	17	16	33	28	4	3	0	3	2
1932–33	Detroit Olympics	IHL	42	10	15	25	20	—	—	—	—	—
1933–34	Montreal Canadiens	NHL	48	6	11	17	4	2	0	1	1	0
1934–35	Montreal Canadiens	NHL	47	4	11	15	4	2	0	2	2	0
1935–36	Boston Bruins	NHL	8	0	0	0	0	—	—	—	—	—
1935–36	Boston Cubs	Can-Am	30	3	10	13	8	—	—	—	—	—
1936–37	Tulsa Oilers	AHA	48	14	17	31	16	—	—	—	—	—
1937–38	Tulsa Oilers	AHA	47	13	23	36	19	4	1	0	1	2
1938–39	Tulsa Oilers	AHA	43	16	25	41	14	8	2	2	4	9
1939–40	Wichita Skyhawks	AHA	44	19	18	37	19	—	—	—	—	—
1940–41	Vancouver Lions	PCHL	47	16	40	56	14	6	2	1	3	0
1941–42	Philadelphia Rockets	AHL	2	1	0	1	0	—	—	—	—	—
1941–42	Hershey Bears	AHL	6	3	0	3	0	10	0	0	0	0
1941–42	Montreal Pats	MCHL	31	15	11	26	8	—	—	—	—	—
1942–43	Cornwall Army	MCHL	20	7	13	20	11	6	0	1	1	0
1942–43	Vancouver St. Regis	PCHL	2	0	0	0	0	—	—	—	—	—
1942–43	Vancouver Norvans	PCHL	6	5	9	14	0	3	0	1	1	0
1944–45	Hershey Bears	AHL	35	5	7	12	7	6	0	0	0	0
AHA totals			270	89	109	198	120	16	6	2	8	13
NHL totals			103	10	22	32	8	4	0	3	3	0
