= Art Smith (ice hockey, born 1906) =

Canadian ice hockey player

- Born: November 29, 1906; Toronto, Ontario, Canada
- Died: May 15, 1962 (aged 55)
- Height: 5 ft 10 in (178 cm)
- Weight: 200 lb (91 kg; 14 st 4 lb)
- Position: Defence
- Shot: Left
- Played for: Ottawa Senators; Toronto Maple Leafs
- Playing career: 1925–1932

Arthur George Smith (November 29, 1906 — May 15, 1962) was a Canadian professional ice hockey player who played 137 games in the National Hockey League with the Toronto Maple Leafs and Ottawa Senators between 1927 and 1931. He was born in Toronto, Ontario.

== Career statistics ==
=== Regular season and playoffs ===
			Regular season					Playoffs
Season	Team	League	GP	G	A	Pts	PIM	GP	G	A	Pts	PIM
1924–25	Toronto Canoe Club	OHA	8	5	4	9	—	2	2	0	2	—
1924–25	Toronto Canoe Club	OHA Sr	2	1	0	1	—	—	—	—	—	—
1925–26	Toronto Canoe Club	OHA	8	5	1	6	—	—	—	—	—	—
1926–27	Toronto Canoe Club	OHA Sr	10	8	3	11	4	—	—	—	—	—
1927–28	Toronto Maple Leafs	NHL	15	5	3	8	22	—	—	—	—	—
1927–28	Toronto Falcons	Can-Pro	29	11	1	12	46	—	—	—	—	—
1928–29	Toronto Maple Leafs	NHL	43	5	0	5	91	4	1	1	2	8
1929–30	Toronto Maple Leafs	NHL	43	3	3	6	79	—	—	—	—	—
1930–31	Ottawa Senators	NHL	43	2	4	6	61	—	—	—	—	—
1931–32	Boston Cubs	Can-Am	1	0	0	0	0	—	—	—	—	—
1931–32	Chicago Shamrocks	AHA	14	0	1	1	20	—	—	—	—	—
NHL totals			144	15	10	25	253	4	1	1	2	8
