= Fred Povey =

Canadian ice hockey player

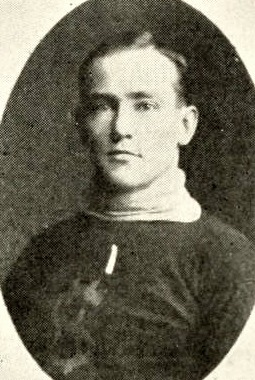
- Povey with the Pittsburgh Bankers.
- Born: March 1, 1884; Sherbrooke, Quebec, Canada
- Died: December 28, 1969 (aged 85); Sherbrooke, Quebec, Canada
- Height: 5 ft 8 in (173 cm)
- Weight: 170 lb (77 kg; 12 st 2 lb)
- Position: Defence
- Shot: Left
- Played for: Pittsburgh Bankers; Pittsburgh Lyceum; Haileybury Hockey Club; All-Montreal Hockey Club; Montreal Canadiens
- Playing career: 1903–1913

Frederick Povey (March 1, 1884 – December 28, 1969) was a Canadian professional ice hockey player from Sherbrooke, Quebec. He played as a defenceman with the Haileybury Hockey Club and Montreal Canadiens of the National Hockey Association between 1910–1913, and with the All-Montreal Hockey Club of the CHA in 1910. Povey also spent time in the Western Pennsylvania Hockey League with the Pittsburgh Bankers and Pittsburgh Lyceum.
