= Frank Robinson (ice hockey) =

Canadian ice hockey executive

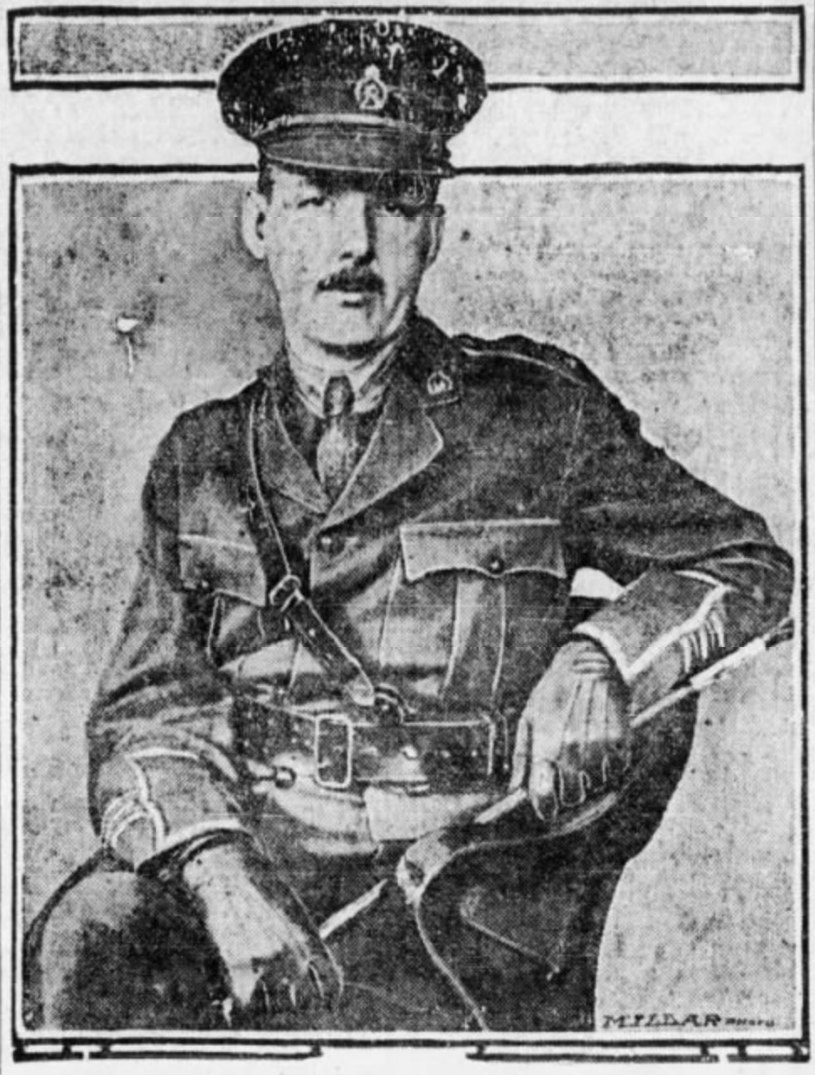
- Robinson in military attire

President of the National Hockey Association
- In office 1916–1917
- Preceded by: Emmett Quinn

Personal details
- Born: c. 1878 Beaverton, Ontario
- Died: July 7, 1931 Montreal, Quebec

Major Frank Grey Robinson (c. 1878 – July 7, 1931) was a Canadian ice hockey executive, soldier and detective agency manager from Montreal. He was an owner of the Toronto Blueshirts ice hockey team and later, president of the National Hockey Association (NHA), a predecessor organization of the National Hockey League (NHL).

Robinson was born in Beaverton, Ontario. From 1907 and until his death in 1931 he was the Montreal branch manager of the Thiel Detective Service Company. He died in Montreal on July 7, 1931, aged 52.

== National Hockey Association ==
In 1911, Robinson, Toronto businessman Percy Quinn and other investors purchased an NHA franchise from Ambrose O'Brien, founder of the NHA. In 1912–13, the team, the Toronto Professional Hockey Club, or Toronto Blueshirts as they were nicknamed took to the ice. In 1913–14, the club won the NHA championship and the Stanley Cup. In 1916, Quinn and Robinson sold the franchise to Eddie Livingstone, the Toronto Ontarios/Shamrocks owner.

Robinson was elected president of the NHA after the resignation of Emmett Quinn in October 1916. Despite being re-elected in October, 1917 for a second term, Robinson would only serve as president of the league for one year. During his term, bickering between team owners led to the suspension of the Toronto franchise and its players taken by the other franchises. Robinson opposed the moves of the owners and resigned due to his position being ineffective.

Sporting positions
Preceded by Emmett Quinn	National Hockey Association President; 1916–1917	Abolished
