= Velocette Spring-heeled Jack =

The Velocette Spring Heeled Jack is a motorcycle built by Velocette at Hall Green, Birmingham, England. This famous works KSS 350cc, sprung frame, Velocette was a prototype and as such the only one ever built by the Hall Green factory. The bike was christened Spring-heeled Jack by Harold Willis, and has been known by that name ever since by enthusiasts all over the world. First registered in May 1927, the motorcycle was a one-off built for Alec Bennett, the factory's number one rider, and was unsuccessfully tried in the practice sessions of the 1928 Isle of Man TT. This bike retained the factories hand change mechanism although the positive stop foot change was to be seen on the other race bikes of that year, and also had a straight through exhaust pipe.

== Sprung frame ==
The bike had a prototype sprung frame built under the Bentley and Draper patents. The frame as far back as the gearbox bracket was normal K. Behind this however is a triangulated tubular swinging fork assembly worked in a trunnion bearing. From the rear fork-ends, two seat-stays were pivoted and connected to the sprung part of the frame below the saddle by a system of links and spindles incorporating two coil springs. Friction dampers were fitted to these links and there were also two more at the bottom pivots at the fork-ends.

Test report written by 'Ubique' in 1928 on Spring-heeled Jack

== TT Practice ==
During the Isle of Man TT practice in 1928, two fast laps were attempted and it was rumoured that under certain conditions the lower front ends of the swinging-fork assembly grounded and possibly the centre stand as well. Due to this problem it was not used in the actual race. This story is then contradicted in an article published in the 21 June issue of The Motor Cycle where the failure to complete the two high speed was attributed to a loose exhaust valve lifter affecting the valve operation. The motorcycle was not used in the actual race and was returned to the Birmingham factory. Despite assurances that the journalist apparently received that the model would go straight into production after the TT, this never happened. This could have been due to there being no provision for adjusting the suspension resulting in difficulty in setting the motorcycle up for riders of differing weights nor would it be possible to accommodate pillion loads. More on this later...

== Modification ==
The bike was returned to the factory from the Isle of Man where it was probably used as a runabout and test bed. Its original hand gear change was replaced with a foot change not long after, and this is still fitted to the bike, as well as a twist grip throttle instead of a lever. Spring-heeled Jack remained at the factory and it was apparently used by Charles Udall of the Velocette Development Department until it was purchased and used for daily transport by Fred Teague.

As to exactly when Fred Teague acquired ‘Spring-heeled Jack, it was certainly before the factory closure in 1971, but we are unsure exactly when.

Photographs however have come to light which seem to point to the fact that the bike came into Freds ownership in the mid to late 1930’s. This assumption is made based on some family photographs showing the bike and the attire being worn by Fred and his friends when on holiday travelling, it is believed, in Cornwall and Devon. Their riding gear certainly points to this being pre-war. Additionally, Freds daughter Judith, was born in the late 1930’s, the holidays were definitely before she was born.

The photographs also show how the bike was converted to be used as daily transport. The photographs show ‘modifications’ such as lights, kick start refitted, side stand, pillion seat and luggage racks. A strange choice if the suspension bottoming and lack of adjustment was an issue in 1928, and the photographs show the bike packed with luggage.

Fred could occasionally be seen riding the bike well into his 70's. The bike was also fitted with a ‘period’ 1927 KSS silencer, although no silencer was fitted in its race form.

== Racing ==
‘Spring Heeled Jack’ returned to the race tracks in the late 1960s and early '70s, and was seen at a number of vintage bike events and raced for the owner by the late Ron Russell.

== Retirement ==
After this brief return to racing, involving a couple of unplanned excursions that left the bike with a few scratches, 'Spring Heeled Jack' was retired from the track and refurbished. Returned to how it had been when it was bought by Mr. Teague.

Mr Teague originally bought the bike from Charles Udall (Velocettes Design Team), after being told about it by a friend of his who was foreman in the engine build department. It was often seen at owners club events and Vintage Motorcycle Club meetings as well as one or two Boxing Day runs, right up until the end of 1999. Ill health then curtailed the bike's outings somewhat and Mr. Teague died on 10 July 2001, aged 90. Spring-heeled Jack can still occasionally be seen at events in the UK.

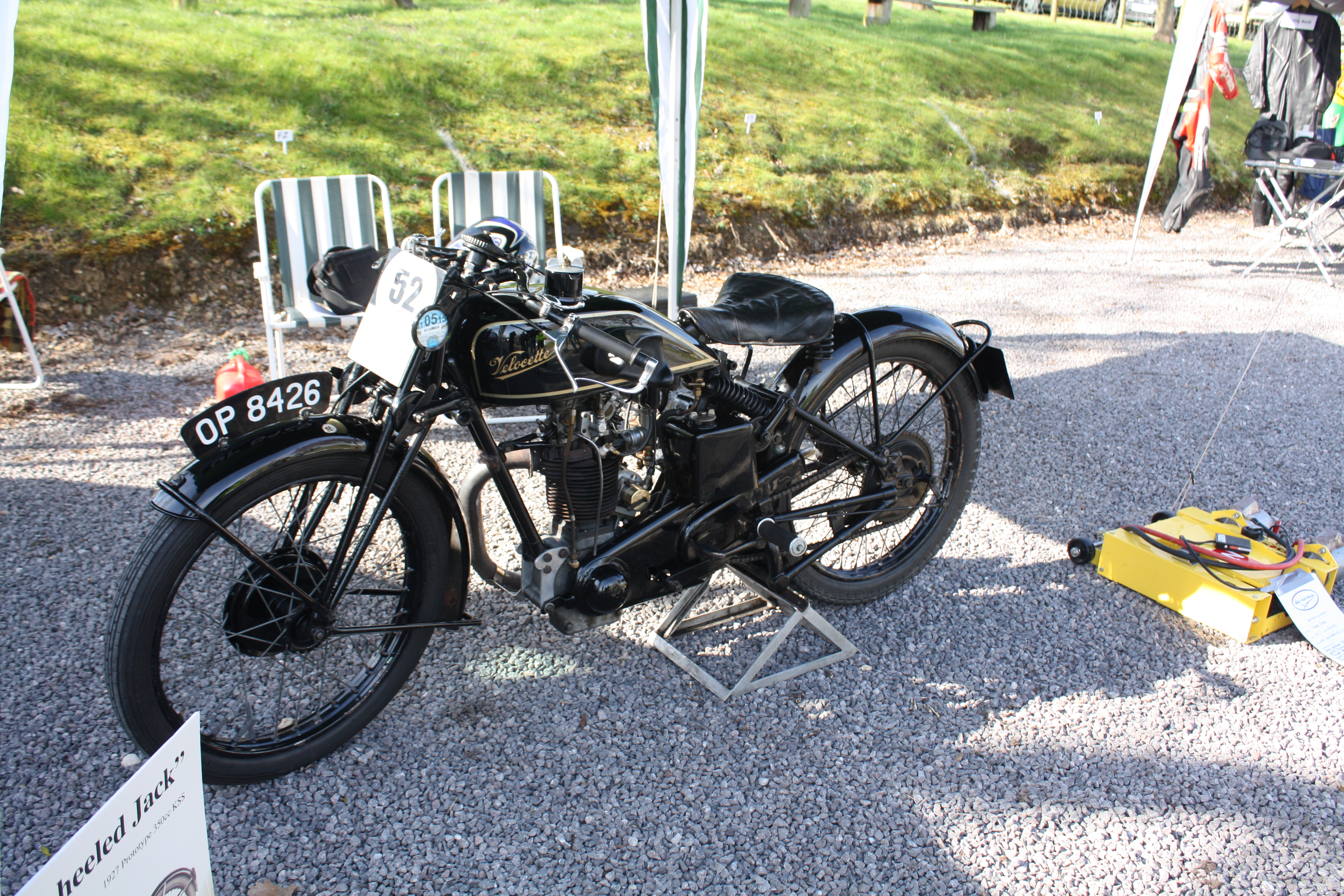
Spring-heeled Jack
