= Jim Seaborn =

Canadian ice hockey player

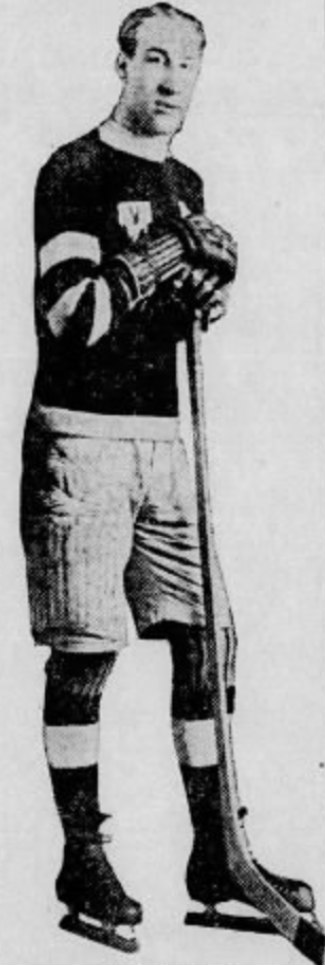
- Born: March 6, 1890 Winnipeg, Manitoba, Canada
- Died: January 15, 1964 (aged 73) Kansas City, Missouri, United States
- Height: 6 ft 2 in (188 cm)
- Weight: 210 lb (95 kg; 15 st 0 lb)
- Position: Defence
- Played for: Vancouver Millionaires; Duluth Hornets; Chicago Cardinals; Kansas City Pla-Mors; St. Louis Flyers; Minneapolis Millers; St. Paul Saints
- Playing career: 1913–1932

Thomas James Seaborn (March 6, 1890 – January 15, 1964) was a Canadian professional ice hockey player who played in the Pacific Coast Hockey Association for the Vancouver Millionaires.

== Playing career ==
Seaborn was a defenceman who played for the Vancouver Millionaires during the 1914–15 and 1915–16 seasons. Seaborn fought in World War I with the Canadian Army before returning to hockey in 1919 with the Everett Reds. He moved to Duluth to play with the Duluth Hornets and had a minor league career in the American Hockey Association (AHA) for Duluth, St. Louis, Chicago, Minnesota, and Kansas City, where he retired in 1932.

Seaborn died at age 71, in 1964 in Kansas City, Missouri.
