= Marvin Wentworth =

Canadian ice hockey player

- Born: January 24, 1904 Grimsby, Ontario, Canada
- Died: October 10, 1982 (aged 78) Toronto, Ontario, Canada
- Height: 5 ft 10 in (178 cm)
- Weight: 170 lb (77 kg; 12 st 2 lb)
- Position: Defence
- Shot: Right
- Played for: Chicago Black Hawks; Montreal Maroons; Montreal Canadiens
- Playing career: 1926–1940

Marvin Palmer Morris "Cyclone Cy" Wentworth (January 24, 1904 – October 10, 1982) was a Canadian hockey player. He played in the National Hockey League between 1927 and 1940 with the Chicago Black Hawks, Montreal Maroons, and Montreal Canadiens. He won the Stanley Cup with the Maroons in 1935.

== Playing career ==
In 1926, Wentworth became a professional player with Eddie Livingstone's Chicago Cardinals, a new team in the American Hockey Association (AHA) which intended to rival the NHL. Under pressure from the NHL, the team folded in March 1921. Wentworth would sign with the Chicago Black Hawks.

In 1931–32, Wentworth, who had become the picture of defensive efficiency, was named the team's captain. Near the beginning of the 1932–33 season, he was traded to the Montreal Maroons. In Montreal, Cy won his first and only Stanley Cup when his Maroons defeated Toronto in the 1935 finals after eliminating his old teammates from Chicago. Wentworth was Montreal's leading point-getter in those playoffs with three goals and two assists in seven games.

Wentworth was traded again just before the Maroons folded in 1938. He didn't have to move far to continue his career, however, as he was traded to the Montreal Canadiens. He played two seasons with the Habs before retiring in 1940, after which he moved to Toronto and became involved in a variety of business interests.

== Career statistics ==
=== Regular season and playoffs ===
			Regular season					Playoffs
Season	Team	League	GP	G	A	Pts	PIM	GP	G	A	Pts	PIM
1922–23	Grimsby Lions	OHA	—	—	—	—	—	—	—	—	—	—
1923–24	Hamilton Jr. Tigers	OHA	—	—	—	—	—	—	—	—	—	—
1924–25	Brantford Lions	OHA Int	—	—	—	—	—	—	—	—	—	—
1925–26	Windsor Hornets	OHA Sr	20	6	5	11	9	—	—	—	—	—
1926–27	Chicago Cardinals	AHA	34	8	4	12	40	—	—	—	—	—
1927–28	Chicago Black Hawks	NHL	43	5	5	10	31	—	—	—	—	—
1928–29	Chicago Black Hawks	NHL	44	2	1	3	44	—	—	—	—	—
1929–30	Chicago Black Hawks	NHL	37	3	4	7	28	—	—	—	—	—
1930–31	Chicago Black Hawks	NHL	44	4	4	8	12	9	1	1	2	14
1931–32	Chicago Black Hawks	NHL	48	3	10	13	30	2	0	0	0	0
1932–33	Montreal Maroons	NHL	47	4	10	14	48	2	0	1	1	0
1933–34	Montreal Maroons	NHL	48	2	5	7	31	4	0	2	2	2
1934–35	Montreal Maroons	NHL	48	4	9	13	28	7	3	2	5	0
1935–36	Montreal Maroons	NHL	48	4	5	9	24	3	0	0	0	0
1936–37	Montreal Maroons	NHL	43	3	4	7	29	5	1	0	1	0
1937–38	Montreal Maroons	NHL	48	4	5	9	32	—	—	—	—	—
1938–39	Montreal Canadiens	NHL	45	0	3	3	12	3	0	0	0	4
1939–40	Montreal Canadiens	NHL	32	1	3	4	6	—	—	—	—	—
NHL totals			575	39	68	107	355	35	5	6	11	20

Preceded by Ty Arbour	Chicago Black Hawks captain 1931–32	Succeeded by Helge Bostrom
