= Velocette KSS =

British motorcycle

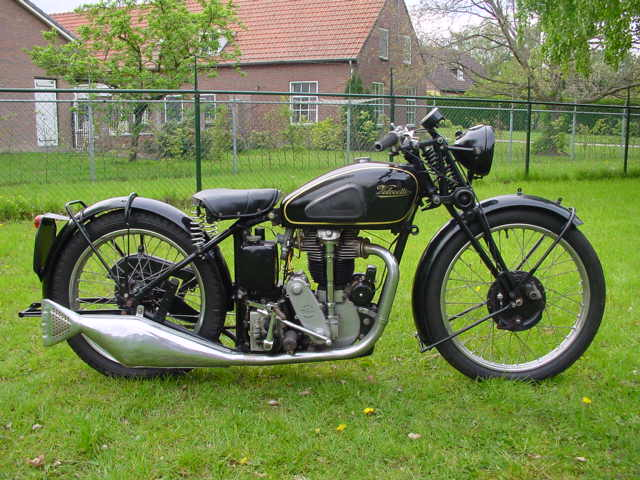
- Manufacturer: Velocette
- Production: 1925–1948
- Engine: 348 cc, OHC air-cooled single
- Top speed: 80 mph
- Power: 25 bhp
- Transmission: Four-speed chain final drive
- Suspension: Girder front, rigid rear
- Brakes: drum brakes
- Wheelbase: 53.75 inches (136.5 cm)
- Seat height: 28 inches (71 cm)
- Weight: 265 pounds (120 kg) (dry)
- Fuel capacity: 2.5 gallons

The Velocette KSS is a British motorcycle made by Velocette, a sports roadster in the “K” series of Velocette motorcycles with overhead camshaft engines. The “K “of the model's name was the next letter in the sequence of letters designating the model, after the Model H two stroke. (The letters “I” and “J” were skipped, presumably to avoid confusion with the digit “1”). “SS” stood for Super Sports. It has been suggested that the “K” stood for “camshaft” because of the founder of the company's German origin, but since the German for “camshaft is “Nockenwelle”, this is extremely unlikely. The KSS remained in production in various forms until 1948.

== Development ==
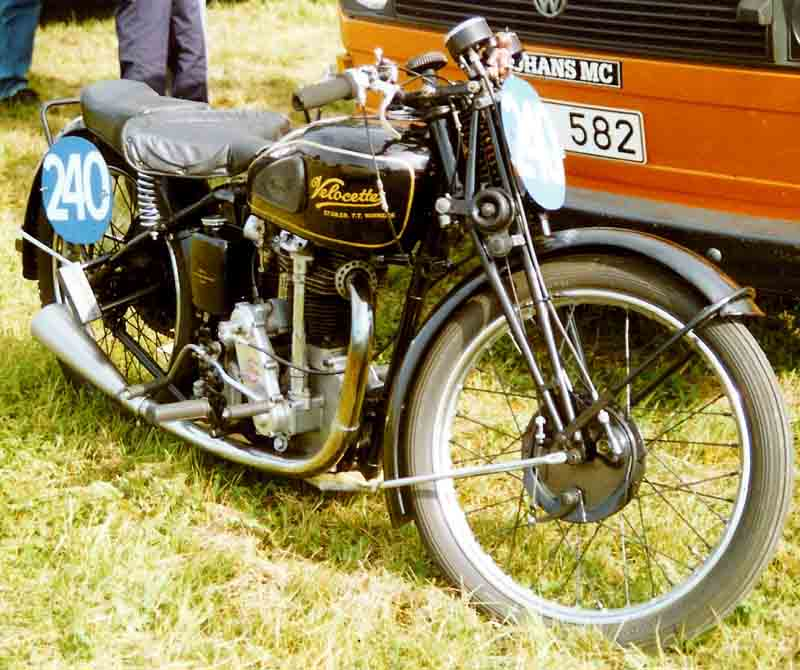
Velocette KSS Racer 1947

A production roadster motorcycle, the KSS was modified with a racing clutch and tuned to achieve 90 mph around the Isle of Man TT course, largely due to the excellent handling. Important improvements included the positive-stop foot-operated gear change from the Velocette KTT production racing version.

In 1936 Velocette developed the KSS Mk II, which had a Velocette MKV KTT based chassis and a new engine with an alloy cylinder head. A touring version, the Velocette KTS was also developed with 19-inch wheels and matching mudguards.

== Racing success ==
Alec Bennett won the 1926 Junior TT a full ten minutes ahead of the next rider. He had a second place in 1927 and won again in 1928 and 1929.

== See also ==
- Velocette
- Velocette Spring-heeled Jack
