= Art Ross =

Canadian ice hockey player (1885–1964)

- Hockey Hall of Fame, 1949
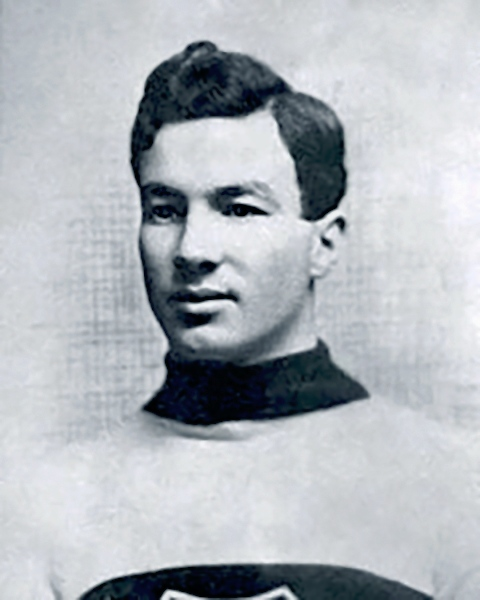
- Ross with the Montreal Wanderers, circa 1907–18
- Born: January 13, 1885 Naughton, Ontario, Canada
- Died: August 5, 1964 (aged 79) Medford, Massachusetts, US
- Height: 5 ft 11 in (180 cm)
- Weight: 190 lb (86 kg; 13 st 8 lb)
- Position: Point/Defence
- Shot: Left
- Played for: Montreal Wanderers; Ottawa Hockey Club; Haileybury Comets; Brandon Wheat City; Kenora Thistles
- Playing career: 1905–1918

Arthur Howey Ross (January 13, 1885 (Note: The date of Ross's birth is disputed. Many sources give the year of his birth as 1886. However, Eric Zweig has noted this is unlikely and has cited contemporary newspaper reports and archival materials to support 1885. The 1885 date was also used on the headstone of Ross's grave when it was replaced in 2014. See Zweig 2015, p. 21.) – August 5, 1964) was a Canadian professional ice hockey player and executive from 1905 until 1954. Regarded as one of the best defenders of his era by his peers, he was one of the first to skate with the puck up the ice rather than pass it to a forward. He was on Stanley Cup championship teams twice in a playing career that lasted thirteen seasons; in January 1907 with the Kenora Thistles and 1908 with the Montreal Wanderers. Like other players of the time, Ross played for several different teams and leagues, and is noted for his time with the Wanderers while they were members of the National Hockey Association (NHA) and its successor, the National Hockey League (NHL). In 1911, he led one of the first organized player strikes over increased pay. When the Wanderers' home arena burned down in January 1918, the team ceased operations and Ross retired as a player.

After several years as an on-ice official, he was named head coach of the Hamilton Tigers for one season. When the Boston Bruins were formed in 1924, Ross was hired as the first coach and general manager of the team. He later coached the team on three occasions until 1945, and stayed as general manager until his retirement in 1954. Ross helped the Bruins finish first place in the league ten times and win the Stanley Cup three times; Ross personally coached the team to two of those victories. After being hired by the Bruins, Ross, along with his wife and two sons, moved to a suburb of Boston, and he became an American citizen in 1938. He died near Boston in 1964.

Outside of his association with the Bruins, Ross also helped to improve the game. He created a style of hockey puck still used today, and advocated an improved style of goal nets, a change that lasted forty years. In 1947, Ross donated the Art Ross Trophy, awarded to the leading scorer of the NHL regular season. Ross was inducted into the Hockey Hall of Fame in 1949. (Note: Some sources give the erroneous date of 1945.)

== Early life ==
Arthur Howey Ross was born on January 13, 1885, in Naughton, Ontario. (Note: Zweig notes that Ross was likely not born in the town of Naughton itself, but was listed as it was "the closest white settlement to the Hudson's Bay Company (HBC) post" that the family lived at. Zweig suggests Ross was likely born at the post itself. See Zweig 2015, p. 22.) His father, Thomas Barnston Ross, was of Scottish descent and originally from Chicoutimi, Quebec, while his mother was Marguerite (Margaret) McLeod. Ross's parents initially lived in Lake St. John, Quebec (now Lac Saint-Jean), where Thomas worked for the Hudson's Bay Company (HBC). The family had ten children: nine sons and one daughter. (Note: Simon Peter; George Munro; Thomas Robert; Charles William; Sybil, Roderick Reddie; Alexander Sinclair; Colin Eric; Arthur Howey; and Donald Walter. See Zweig 2015, pp. 23–25.) Around 1876, Thomas was transferred to a trading post in Northern Ontario close to the Whitefish Lake. Living in a remote outpost, the family would trek 370 kilometres (230 mi) each way twice a year for supplies.

Ross spent his early years at the trading post and first learned to skate on the nearby lake. He grew up speaking English, and was taught French by his mother, and later in life claimed he knew Ojibwe and Montagnais. In 1892, the family moved back to Lake St. John, though Margaret left Thomas in 1895, and moved back to Ontario with her younger children. She married Peter McKenzie, who was the Chief Factor for HBC in the region (and thus Thomas's superior) in 1895. They moved again in 1896, settling in the affluent Westmount district of Montreal. Thomas also re-married, and by 1904 was living in Victoria, British Columbia, where he died in 1930.

In Montreal, Ross attended Westmount Academy, and became active in a variety of sports, though he was best at hockey and Canadian football (which was still very similar to rugby football at the time). He likely first played organized hockey in the 1900–01 season, joining the Westmount Amateur Athletic Association. With this club, he first met the brothers Lester and Frank Patrick, both of whom were later inducted into the Hockey Hall of Fame. Ross and Lester had a financially successful ticket resale business at the Montreal Arena, buying tickets for thirty-five cents and selling them for up to a dollar.

== Playing career ==
=== 1905–09 ===
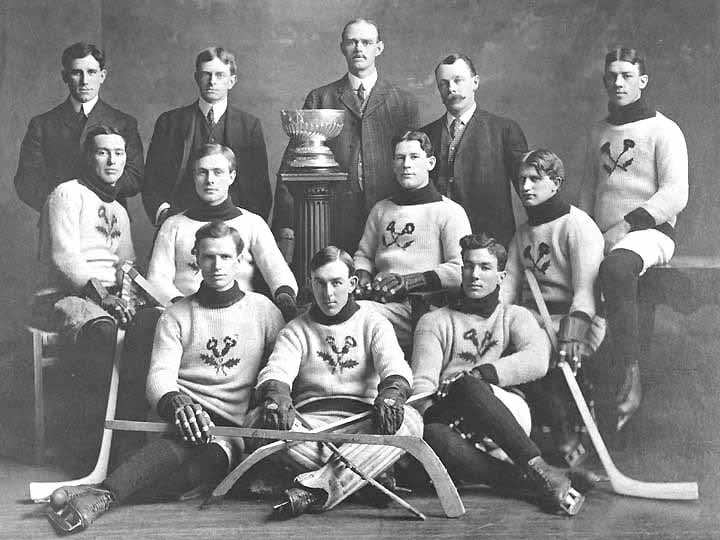
The Kenora Thistles posing for a photo with the Stanley Cup in 1907. Ross is in the front row, far right.

The best hockey players on their high school team, Ross and the Patrick brothers were invited to play occasional games for local league teams in Montreal. Ross first played in a senior league in 1905, joining Montreal Westmount of the Canadian Amateur Hockey League (CAHL), the top amateur league in Canada. He scored ten goals in eight games during the season. His opponents regarded him as one of the best-rushing defencemen. Most defenders at the time either shot the puck down the ice or passed to a forward; in contrast, Ross skated up the ice, taking the puck into the offensive zone. Later that year, wishing to pursue a career in banking, he moved to Brandon, Manitoba, where he joined the Brandon Wheat City Hockey Club of the Manitoba Hockey League, the senior league in the province. In 1906, his first season, he scored six goals in seven games while he recorded six goals in ten games in 1907. Around this time, the Kenora Thistles, the Manitoba League champions, wanted to strengthen their team for the Stanley Cup challenge against the Montreal Wanderers in Montreal during January 1907. They paid Ross $1,000 to play both matches, a common practice at the time, and the Thistles won the Cup. While failing to score, Ross started many plays and proved an important part of the team. Although he played for the opposing team, he received a good reception from the Montreal crowd. Ross did not play for the Thistles when the two teams played for the Cup again in March, which the Wanderers won to take back the Cup.

The following year Ross moved back to Montreal. He joined the Wanderers, the team he had helped to defeat, who played in the Eastern Canada Amateur Hockey Association (ECAHA), the successor league to the CAHL as the premier league in the country. He scored eight goals in ten games over the two-month season that lasted from January to March. He helped the team to finish first in the ECAHA and retain the Cup in 1908 with challenges from Ottawa, Winnipeg and Toronto. The Wanderers were Cup champions throughout these challenges, so Ross became the second player to win the Cup with different teams in consecutive years, after Jack Marshall in 1901 and 1902. In January 1908, he participated in the first all-star game in sports history, a benefit for the family of former Wanderer defender Hod Stuart, who died the previous summer. Aside from his time with the Wanderers, Ross repeated his practice of playing for other teams who paid for his services in important matches. For the 1909 season Ross demanded a salary of $1,600. Although he settled for $1,200, the average salary of hockey players at the time was $600. Ross received a cash bonus of $400 to play in a Stanley Cup challenge against a team from Edmonton in December 1908, in which the Wanderers won the two-game, total-goal series 13–10. He finished the season with two goals in nine games.

=== 1909–18 ===
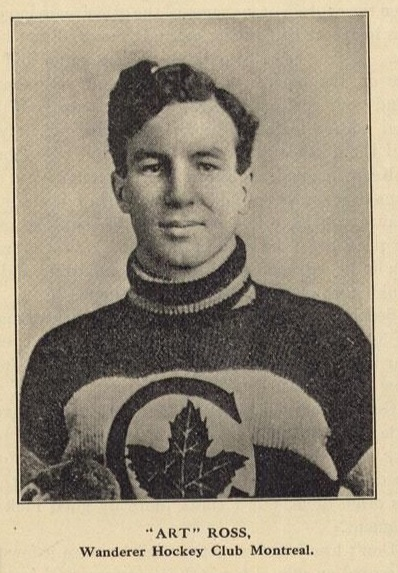
Art Ross circa 1909

A new league, the Canadian Hockey Association (CHA), was formed in late November 1909. One of the teams, the All-Montreal Hockey Club, hired Ross as a playing manager, but the league only lasted until mid-January 1910 before disbanding. Ross, who scored four goals in four games in the CHA, then signed with the Haileybury Comets of the National Hockey Association (NHA), a league formed in December 1909, which proved to be the stronger replacement to the ECAHA as the highest level of hockey in Canada. He received $2,700 to play in the 1910 season, which lasted from January to March, playing twelve games for the team and finishing with six goals. Before the following season, the NHA imposed a salary cap of $5,000 per team. The players, including Ross, were unhappy as this would result in a pay decrease, and began looking to form their league without a cap. Ross wrote to the Montreal Herald, stating "all the players want is a fair deal ... The players are not trying to bulldoze the NHA, but we want to know where we get off at." The plans were abandoned when they realized all the suitable arenas would be unavailable as they were owned or leased by the NHA. Ross scored four goals in eleven games with the Wanderers, who finished fourth in the five-team league. During a match against the Quebec Bulldogs on February 25, 1911, Ross knocked out Eddie Oatman in a fight, provoking a massive brawl between the two teams, which the police had to break up. The fight helped to increase the reputation Ross had as a tough player unwilling to back down from any opponent. The following season Ross had eleven goals in nineteen games as the Wanderers improved to second in the league.

Before the 1913–14 NHA season, Ross refused to sign a contract for the Wanderers, requesting a salary increase. As one of the top players on the team, the Wanderers agreed to his demands of $1,500 for the forthcoming season, in which he finished with four goals and nine points in eighteen games. The next season Ross, again concerned with his salary, began negotiating with other players in the NHA to leave their teams and form a new league that would offer higher wages. These actions resulted in his suspension in November 1914 by Emmett Quinn, president of the NHA. Ross responded by declaring himself a free agent and claiming his contract with the Wanderers was no longer valid. Consequently, although having no technical power to do so, Quinn suspended Ross from all organized hockey. The proposed new league failed to materialize and Ross applied for reinstatement to the NHA, which was granted at a meeting of the team owners on December 18, 1914. The owners realized if they suspended Ross, they would also have to suspend all those he signed, hurting the league. However, Ross's actions led to his release by the Wanderers. At first he trained with the Montreal Canadiens, then joined the Ottawa Senators.

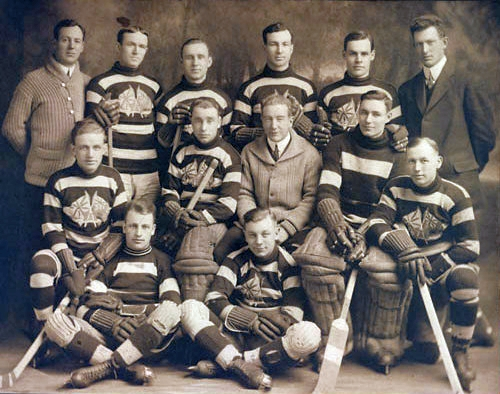
The Ottawa Senators during the 1914–15 NHA season. Ross is in the back row, fourth from left.

After the 1914–15 season, the Senators and Wanderers finished with identical records of fourteen wins and six losses. A two-game, total goal series was played to determine the NHA league champion who would contest the Stanley Cup with the Pacific Coast Hockey Association winner, the Vancouver Millionaires. Ross, who finished with three goals in sixteen games in the season, scored one goal in the first match against the Wanderers, a Senators 4–0 victory, and though Ottawa lost the second game 1–0, they won the series, 4–1. To help the Senators stop the Wanderers, who were known for their speed, Ross created a new system of defence. Termed "kitty bar the door", it required three defenders to align themselves across the ice 30 feet in front of the goaltender to stop offensive rushes. This style of defence would later be used in a modified version known as the neutral zone trap, later used widely to stop opposition offensive chances.

The following year Ross, who had eight goals and eight assists in twenty-one games, was the second highest-paid player on the team; his salary of $1,400 was $100 less than Frank Nighbor made. Even so, Ross left the team in 1916, returning to Montreal to look after his sporting goods store, and rejoining the Wanderers. He scored six goals and had two assists in sixteen games for the team.

The Wanderers, along with the Montreal Canadiens, Toronto Arenas, Quebec Bulldogs, and Ottawa Senators dissolved the NHA and founded the National Hockey League (NHL) in November 1917. Before the start of the season, Ross was named coach of the Wanderers, in addition to playing for the team. He played in the first game in NHL history on December 19, 1917, in which the Wanderers defeated the Toronto Arenas 10–9, in Montreal; Ross earned the league's first penalty during the game and also scored his first and only NHL goal. A fire on January 2, 1918, destroyed their home, the Montreal Arena, and forced them to fold after four games. However, the NHL insisted the team continue to play, and recorded two additional scheduled matches as defaulted losses for the Wanderers, even though the matches were not played. With the Wanderers disbanded, Ross retired as a player. His NHL career yielded one goal in three games played.

== Managerial career ==
=== 1918–36 ===
Ross began his career as a hockey coach during his playing days when at age 25 he led the McGill University Redmen to a 4–2–1 record during the 1910–11 season. In 1915, Art Ross was the Coach of The Canadian Grenadier Guards Hockey Club. Following his playing career, Ross became an NHL referee. He was hired to coach the Hamilton Tigers for the 1922–23 season, and adopted new methods in training camp that emphasized physical fitness, including work off the ice. However, the Tigers finished with a record of six wins and eighteen losses, last in the NHL for the third successive year, and Ross did not return the next season. His next coaching appointment arose from meeting Boston grocery store magnate Charles Adams during the 1924 Stanley Cup Final. Before the 1924 season, the NHL awarded Adams an expansion team. Adams' first move was to hire Ross as vice president, general manager, coach, and scout. Adams instructed Ross to come up with a nickname portraying an untamed animal displaying speed, agility and cunning. With this in mind, Ross named the team the Boston Bruins, after the Old English word for a bear. The team's nickname went perfectly with the original colours of brown and yellow, which were the same colours of Adams' grocery chain, First National Stores.

Ross utilized his many hockey connections throughout Canada and the United States to sign players. Even so, the team started poorly. Early in the first season the University of Toronto hockey team was in Boston for matches against local universities. The team's manager, Conn Smythe, who later owned and managed the Toronto Maple Leafs, said that his team could easily defeat the Bruins—Ross's team had won only two of their first fifteen NHL games. This began a feud between Smythe and Ross which lasted for over 40 years, until Ross's death; while mostly confined to newspaper reports, they refused to speak to each other at NHL Board of Governor meetings. The Bruins finished their first season with six wins in thirty games, one of the worst records in the history of the league. Several records were set throughout the season; the three home wins are tied for the second-fewest ever, and an eleven-game losing streak from December 8, 1924, until February 17, 1925, set a record for longest losing streak, surpassed in 2004 and now second longest in history. With 17 wins in 36 games the following season, the team greatly improved and finished one point out of a playoff spot.

In 1926 the Western Hockey League, the other top professional hockey league, was in decline. The Patrick brothers, who controlled the league, offered to sell the remaining five teams for $300,000. Ross realized the potential talent available and convinced Adams to pay the money. As a result, the Bruins acquired the rights to several future Hall of Fame players, the most notable being defender Eddie Shore. Ross signed goaltender Cecil "Tiny" Thompson in 1928, who was with a team in Minnesota, despite never watching him play; Ralph "Cooney" Weiland was also brought over from Minnesota. Ross acquired Cy Denneny from Ottawa and made him a player-assistant-coach while he assumed the role of coach and team manager. On November 20, 1928, the Bruins moved to a new arena when the Boston Garden opened. The team played the Canadiens who won the match 1–0 in front of 16,000 fans. The players signed by Ross helped the Bruins to improve quickly, and they won the Stanley Cup in 1929. Denneny retired after the Cup win, and Ross guided the team to several league records in the 1929–30 season. The team won 38 of 44 games for a .875 winning percentage, the highest in league history; the five losses tied a record for the fewest ever, and the four road losses tied a record for the second fewest. The Bruins also only finished one game in a tie, a record for the fewest ties in a season since the NHL began recording the record in 1926. One of the longest winning streaks was also set during the season. From December 3, 1929, until January 9, 1930, the team won fourteen games in a row, a record that lasted until 1982 and now tied for the third longest, as of October 2010. A home winning streak began the same day and lasted for twenty games, until March 18, 1930, which was tied for the longest of its kind in 1976. In 1930–31, the Bruins again lost only one home game, which equalled their previous record.

On March 26, 1931, Ross substituted a sixth skater for goaltender Tiny Thompson in the final minute of play in a playoff game against the Montreal Canadiens. Although the Bruins lost the game 1–0, Ross became the first coach to replace his goaltender with an extra attacker, a tactic that became a widespread practice in hockey. Stepping aside as coach in 1934 to focus on managing the team, Ross hired Frank Patrick as coach with a salary of $10,500, which was high for such a role. However rumours spread during the season that Patrick was drinking heavily and not being as strict with the players as Ross wanted. After the Bruins lost their playoff series with the Toronto Maple Leafs in the 1936 playoffs, the result of an 8–1 score in the second game, a newspaper claimed that Patrick had been drinking the day of the game and had trouble controlling the team. Several days later, Ross relieved Patrick of his duties and once again assumed the role of coach.

=== 1936–54 ===
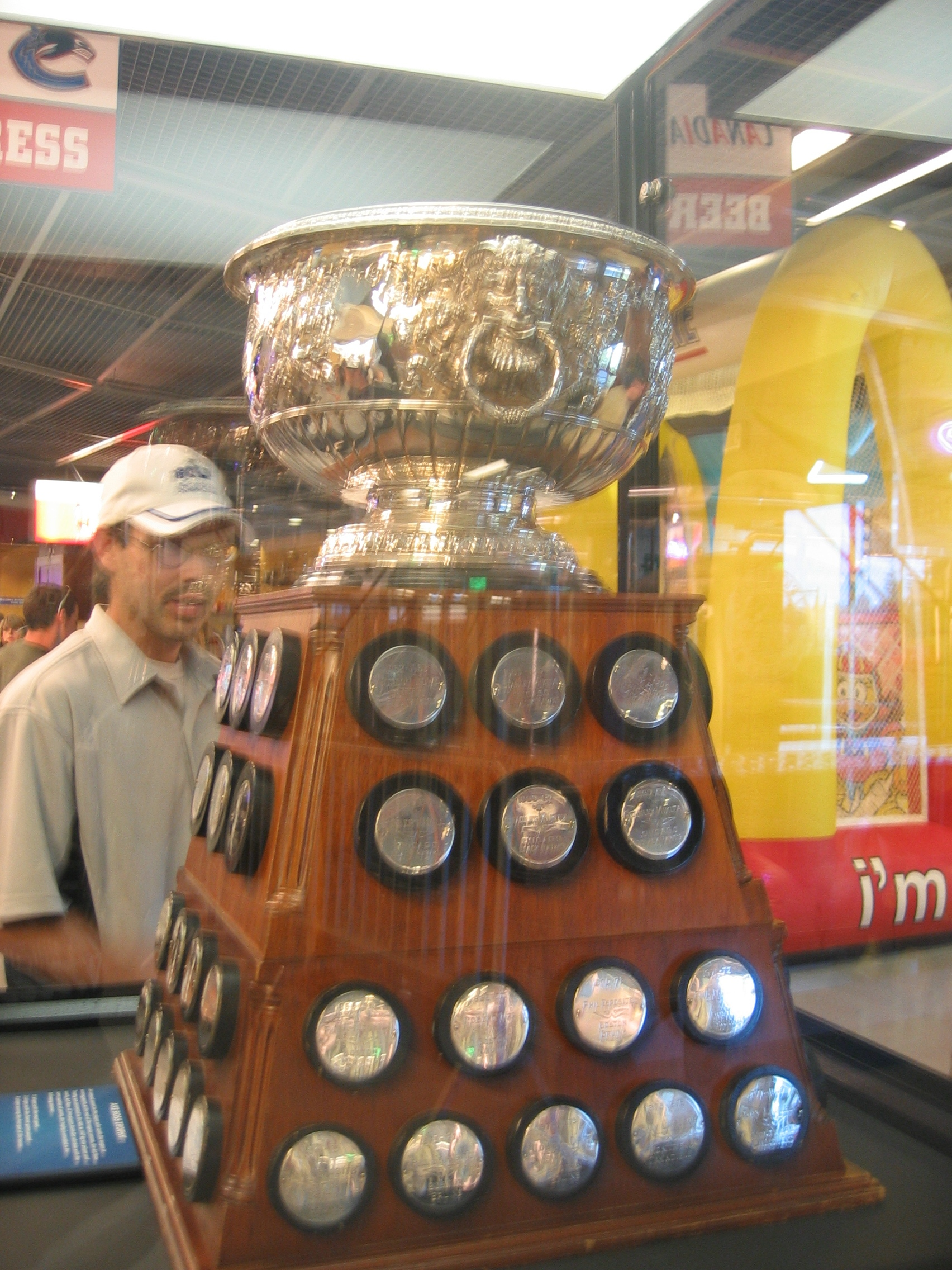
The Art Ross Trophy. Ross donated the trophy in 1947 to be awarded to the leading scorer in the NHL regular season.

Ross took over an improved team. He had recently signed three players, Milt Schmidt, Bobby Bauer and Woody Dumart, who all grew up together in Kitchener, Ontario, and had them play on the same line, soon nicknamed the Kraut Line about the German heritage of all three. Along with them, Ross had acquired a new goaltender in 1938, Frank Brimsek; after Brimsek earned six shutouts in his first eight games, the Bruins traded away Tiny Thompson to allow Brimsek to play. With these players the Bruins finished first in the league in 1937–38; Ross was named as the second best coach in the league, selected for the end of season All-Star second team. The next season the Bruins won 36 of 48 games, and won the Stanley Cup in the playoffs; Ross was named to the first All-Star team as the best coach in the league for the season and the team only tied two games, which is tied for the second-fewest in a season. He hired the recently retired Cooney Weiland to coach the Bruins for the 1939–40 NHL season. The Bruins would win the Cup again in 1941 and tied their record of only four away losses all season. Ross once again took over as coach of the team before the 1941–42 season began, as Weiland became coach of the Hershey Bears of the American Hockey League, and led the team to 25 wins in 48 games, which was enough to earn third place in the league. By this time the Second World War had caused several Bruins players, including the entire Kraut Line and goaltender Brimsek, to enlist in their respective armed forces. The Bruins finished second in the NHL during the 1942–43 season with 24 wins in 50 games and Ross was again named in the Second NHL All-Star team as the second best coach in the league. The Bruins missed the playoffs in 1943–44, the first time in ten years they failed to qualify, but returned to the playoffs the next season, something they did for five straight years.

On November 11, 1943, Art Ross became the first NHL coach to pull the goaltender for an extra attacker when he pulled goaltender Bert Gardiner for an extra attacker to go for the tie against the Chicago Blackhawks. Clint Smith scored the first empty-net goal in NHL history and the Bruins lost 6–4.

In 1949, Ross had signed Georges Boucher as coach, but Boucher did not work well with Ross and team president Weston Adams. Looking to hire a new coach in the summer of 1950, Ross phoned Lynn Patrick, the son of Lester, who had just resigned from the New York Rangers after coaching the team to the Stanley Cup Final. Lynn had moved his family back to Victoria, British Columbia, where he grew up as a child, intending to coach the Victoria Cougars, a team in the minor professional Pacific Coast Hockey League. Though reluctant to move back to the eastern United States, Lynn was hired by Ross after he was offered a salary of $12,000. He would coach the team for the next four seasons and become the second general manager of the Bruins when Ross retired at the end of October 1954.

== Legacy ==
Aside from his hockey career, Ross was interested in improving the game. Before the start of the 1927–28 season, the NHL adopted a new style of goal net created by Ross. With the back molded into a B-shape, it was better designed to catch pucks and the net was used until 1984, when a modified version was adopted. He also improved the design of the puck. Ross's design had bevel edges, which prevented it from bouncing too much, and used synthetic rubber, rather than the natural rubber previously in vogue. Along with New York Rangers coach Frank Boucher, Ross helped to create the red line, which was introduced to help speed up the game by removing the ability for defenders to pass the puck from the defensive to offensive zone; until 2006 it was against the rules of hockey to make a two-line pass. More scoring chances resulted as teams could not simply send the puck down the ice with impunity. To help tell the red line and blue lines apart on television, Ross suggested that the red line be striped.

Regarded throughout his playing career as one of the best defenders in hockey, Ross was named to the Hockey Hall of Fame in 1949, selected for his playing career rather than his work as an executive. A ceremony for his induction was held before a Bruins game on December 2, 1949, where he was given his Hall of Fame scroll and a silver tray with the emblems of the six NHL teams on it. In 1975 he was inducted into the Canadian Sports Hall of Fame. Along with his two sons he donated the Art Ross Trophy to the NHL in 1947, to be awarded to the leading scorer in the league's regular season. In 1984 he was posthumously awarded the Lester Patrick Trophy for service to hockey in the United States.

== Personal life ==
After graduating from high school in 1903, Ross began working at Merchants Bank and occasionally played for their hockey team. When he moved to Brandon, Ross transferred to a local branch. In 1906 Ross resigned from the bank, and instead joined the Wheat City Flour Mills Company. Ross opened a sporting goods store in Montreal, Art Ross & Co. in 1908, and would run that for several decades. In 1928, he served as the traveling secretary of the Boston Braves baseball team, which was owned by Bruins owner Charles Adams.

On April 14, 1915, Ross married Muriel Kay, a native of Montreal; they had two sons, Arthur, Jr. and John. During the Second World War, both sons served in the Royal Canadian Air Force. After the war Ross made his son Art the business manager for the Bruins. Ross was named coach and manager of the Boston Bruins in 1924 and moved his family to Brookline, Massachusetts, a suburb of Boston, after being hired. He became a naturalized American citizen on April 22, 1938. On August 5, 1964, Ross died at a nursing home in Medford, Massachusetts, a suburb of Boston, at the age of 79. A sister, both his sons and three grandchildren survived him.

== Career statistics ==
=== Regular season and playoffs ===
			Regular season					Playoffs
Season	Team	League	GP	G	A	Pts	PIM	GP	G	A	Pts	PIM
1902–03	Montreal Westmount	CAHL-I	—	—	—	—	—	—	—	—	—	—
1903–04	Montreal Westmount	CAHL-I	—	—	—	—	—	—	—	—	—	—
1904–05	Montreal Westmount	CAHL	8	10	0	10	—	—	—	—	—	—
1905–06	Brandon Wheat City	MHL	7	6	0	6	—	—	—	—	—	—
1906–07	Kenora Thistles	St-Cup	—	—	—	—	—	2	0	0	0	10
1906–07	Brandon Wheat City	MPHL	10	6	3	9	11	2	1	0	1	3
1907–08	Montreal Wanderers	ECAHA	10	8	0	8	27	—	—	—	—	—
1907–08	Montreal Wanderers	St-Cup	—	—	—	—	—	5	3	0	3	23
1907–08	Pembroke Lumber Kings	UOVHL	1	5	0	5	—	—	—	—	—	—
1908–09	Montreal Wanderers	ECAHA	9	2	0	2	30	—	—	—	—	—
1908–09	Montreal Wanderers	St-Cup	—	—	—	—	—	2	0	0	0	13
1908–09	Cobalt Silver Kings	TPHL	—	—	—	—	—	2	1	0	1	0
1909–10	All-Montreal HC	CHA	4	4	0	4	3	—	—	—	—	—
1909–10	Haileybury Comets	NHA	12	6	0	6	25	—	—	—	—	—
1910–11	Montreal Wanderers	NHA	11	4	0	4	24	—	—	—	—	—
1911–12	Montreal Wanderers	NHA	18	16	0	16	35	—	—	—	—	—
1911–12	NHA All-Stars	Exhib	3	4	0	4	0	—	—	—	—	—
1912–13	Montreal Wanderers	NHA	19	11	0	11	58	—	—	—	—	—
1912–13	NHA All-Stars	Exhib	5	4	0	4	18	—	—	—	—	—
1913–14	Montreal Wanderers	NHA	18	4	5	9	74	—	—	—	—	—
1914–15	Ottawa Senators	NHA	16	3	1	4	55	2	1	0	1	25
1914–15	Ottawa Senators	St-Cup	—	—	—	—	—	3	0	0	0	0
1915–16	Ottawa Senators	NHA	21	8	8	16	69	—	—	—	—	—
1916–17	Montreal Wanderers	NHA	16	6	2	8	66	—	—	—	—	—
1917–18	Montreal Wanderers	NHL	3	1	0	1	12	—	—	—	—	—
ECAHA totals			19	10	0	10	57	—	—	—	—	—
NHA totals			131	56	16	72	406	2	1	0	1	25
NHL totals			3	1	0	1	12	—	—	—	—	—

- Career stats from Total Hockey

=== Coaching record ===
			Regular season					Playoffs
Season	Team	League	GC	W	L	T	Finish	GC	W	L	T	Result
1917–18	Montreal Wanderers	NHL	6	1	5	0	4th, NHL	—	—	—	—	—
1922–23	Hamilton Tigers	NHL	24	6	18	0	4th, NHL	—	—	—	—	—
1924–25	Boston Bruins	NHL	30	6	24	0	6th, NHL	—	—	—	—	—
1925–26	Boston Bruins	NHL	36	17	15	4	4th, NHL	—	—	—	—	—
1926–27	Boston Bruins	NHL	44	21	20	3	2nd, American	8	2	2	4	Lost in finals
1927–28	Boston Bruins	NHL	44	20	13	11	1st, American	2	0	1	1	Lost in semifinals
1928–29	Boston Bruins	NHL	44	26	13	5	1st, American	5	5	0	0	Won Stanley Cup
1929–30	Boston Bruins	NHL	44	38	5	1	1st, American	6	3	3	0	Lost in finals
1930–31	Boston Bruins	NHL	44	28	10	6	1st, American	5	2	3	0	Lost in semifinals
1931–32	Boston Bruins	NHL	48	15	21	12	4th, American	—	—	—	—	—
1932–33	Boston Bruins	NHL	48	25	15	8	1st, American	5	2	3	0	Lost in semifinals
1933–34	Boston Bruins	NHL	48	18	25	5	4th, American	—	—	—	—	—
1936–37	Boston Bruins	NHL	48	23	18	7	2nd, American	3	1	2	—	Lost in quarterfinals
1937–38	Boston Bruins	NHL	48	30	11	7	1st, American	3	0	3	—	Lost in semifinals
1938–39	Boston Bruins	NHL	48	36	10	2	1st, NHL	12	8	4	—	Won Stanley Cup
1941–42	Boston Bruins	NHL	48	25	17	6	3rd, NHL	5	2	3	—	Lost in semifinals
1942–43	Boston Bruins	NHL	50	24	17	9	2nd, NHL	9	4	5	—	Lost in finals
1943–44	Boston Bruins	NHL	50	19	26	5	5th, NHL	—	—	—	—	—
1944–45	Boston Bruins	NHL	50	16	30	4	4th, NHL	7	3	4	—	Lost in semifinals
NHL totals			802	394	313	95	—	70	32	33	5	Two Stanley Cups

- Coaching stats from Total Hockey

== Awards ==
=== NHL ===
Award	Year(s)
First All-Star team Coach	1939
Second All-Star team Coach	1938, 1943
Lester Patrick Trophy	1984

*Awards from Legends of Hockey

== Bibliography ==
- "Art Ross Given Banquet, To Become A US Citizen", Lewiston Evening Journal, Lewiston, Maine, Associated Press, April 22, 1938
- "Favor Boston In Hockey", Reading Eagle, Reading, Pennsylvania, Associated Press, October 30, 1941
- "Art Ross Gives Bruins' Side Of Buck Boucher's Dismissal", Ottawa Citizen, Ottawa, Associated Press, April 3, 1950
- Canada's Sports Hall of Fame (2011), "Art Ross", SportsHall.ca, archived from the original on November 13, 2013
- "Art Ross Dies at 79", The Gazette, Montreal, Canadian Press, August 6, 1964
- Diamond, Dan, ed. (2003), Total Hockey: The Official Encyclopedia of the National Hockey League, Second Edition, New York: Total Sports Publishing, ISBN 1-894963-16-4
- Duff, Bob (2017), The First Season: 1917–18 and the Birth of the NHL, Windsor, Ontario: Biblioasis, ISBN 978-1-771961-84-4
- Goyens, Chrys; Orr, Frank (2000), Blades on Ice: A century of professional hockey, Markham, Ontario: Team Power Enterprises, ISBN 0-9686220-0-3
- Hockey Hall of Fame (2003), Honoured Members, Bolton, Ontario: Fenn Publishing, ISBN 1-55168-239-7
- Hockey Hall of Fame (2010), "Art Ross Page", LegendsofHockey.net
- Hockey Hall of Fame (2010), "Art Ross Stats Page", LegendsofHockey.net
- Holzman, Morey; Nieforth, Joseph (2002), Deceptions and Doublecross: How the NHL Conquered Hockey, Toronto: Dundurn Press, ISBN 1-55002-413-2
- Hughes, Morgan; Fischler, Stan and Shirley; Romain, Joseph; Duplacey, James (2003), Hockey Chronicle: Year-by-Year History of the National Hockey League, Lincolnwood, Illinois: Publications International, Ltd., ISBN 0-7853-9624-1
- Kitchen, Paul (2008), Win, Tie, or Wrangle: The Inside Story of the Old Ottawa Senators, 1883–1935, Manotic, Ontario: Penumbra Press, ISBN 978-1-897323-46-5
- McKinley, Michael (2009), Hockey: A People's History, Toronto: McClelland & Stewart, ISBN 978-0-7710-5771-7
- McKinley, Michael (1993), Hockey Hall of Fame Legends: The Official Book, Toronto: Viking Press, ISBN 0-670-85258-9
- McKinley, Michael (2000), Putting a Roof on Winter: Hockey's Rise from Sport to Spectacle, Vancouver: Greystone Books, ISBN 1-55054-798-4
- National Hockey League (2009), National Hockey League Official Guide & Record Book 2010, Toronto: Dan Diamond & Associates, Inc., ISBN 978-1-60078-303-6
- Podnieks, Andrew (2004), Lord Stanley's Cup, Bolton, Ontario: Fenn Publishing, ISBN 1-55168-261-3
- Podnieks, Andrew (2005), Silverware, Bolton, Ontario: Fenn Publishing, ISBN 978-1-55168-296-9
- Podnieks, Andrew (2000), The NHL All-Star Game: Fifty Years of the Great Tradition, Toronto: HarperCollins, ISBN 0-00-200058-X
- Weir, Glenn; Chapman, Jeff; Weir, Travis (1999), Ultimate Hockey, Toronto: Stoddart Publishing, ISBN 0-7737-6057-1
- Wesley, Sam; Wesley, David (2005), Hamilton's Hockey Tigers, Toronto: James Lorimer & Company, ISBN 978-1-55028-887-2
- Zweig, Eric (2015), Art Ross: The Hockey Legend Who Built the Bruins, Dundurn Press, ISBN 978-1-4597-3040-3

Sporting positions
Preceded by Dickie Boon	Head coach of the Montreal Wanderers; 1913–14	Succeeded by Dickie Boon
Preceded by Dickie Boon	Head coach of the Montreal Wanderers; 1917–18	Succeeded by Team folded
Preceded by Percy Thompson	Head coach of the Hamilton Tigers; 1922–23	Succeeded by Percy LeSueur
Preceded by Position created	General Manager of the Boston Bruins; 1924–1954	Succeeded by Lynn Patrick
Preceded by Position created	Head coach the Boston Bruins; 1924–1928	Succeeded by Cy Denneny
Preceded by Cy Denneny	Head coach of the Boston Bruins; 1929–1934	Succeeded by Frank Patrick
Preceded by Frank Patrick	Head coach of the Boston Bruins; 1936–1939	Succeeded by Cooney Weiland
Preceded by Cooney Weiland	Head coach of the Boston Bruins; 1941–1945	Succeeded by Dit Clapper
