= All-Montreal Hockey Club =

Professional ice hockey team

- Founded: 1909
- History: All-Montreal HC; 1909/10 (CHA)
- City: Montreal, Quebec
- Team colours: Blue and White
- Stanley Cups: 0

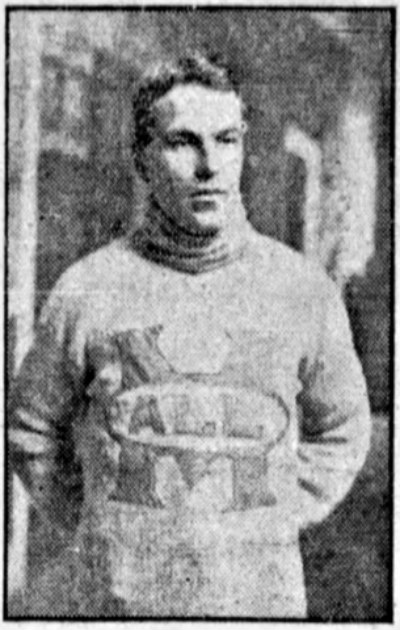
Paddy Moran with the All-Montreal HC.

The All-Montreal Hockey Club were a men's professional ice hockey team that played in the short-lived Canadian Hockey Association. It was organized by Art Ross in 1909 and played its first game against the Montreal Nationals on December 30, 1909 winning 7 goals to 2.

The CHA merged into the National Hockey Association on January 15, 1910. Three of the five CHA franchises would join the NHA. The All-Montreal HC were left out of the merger because the Montreal Wanderers were already the established team representing the Anglophone fan base in Montreal in the NHA. After the cancellation of the franchise, Ross himself, along with goaltender Paddy Moran, joined the NHA as a member of the Haileybury Comets. Playing just four games, the All-Montreal HC was one of the shortest lived pro franchises in sports history.

== Notable players ==
- Art Ross – 1949 Hockey Hall of Fame inductee
- Paddy Moran – 1958 Hockey Hall of Fame inductee
- Jack Marks – Stanley Cup champion with 1912 & 1913 Quebec Bulldogs
