= Chicago Shamrocks =

American ice hockey team (1930–1932)

The Chicago Shamrocks were an ice hockey team based in Chicago, Illinois, that played 2 seasons in the old American Hockey Association league from 1930 to 1932. They were owned by Hockey Hall of Famer James E. Norris.

== History ==
In 1930, Norris pursued the NHL for rights to a second NHL team in Chicago, but was spurned by the league who supported the NHL Chicago Black Hawks' concerns regarding competition for fan base. He turned to the American Hockey Association who gave him rights to an expansion team in Chicago. The league had renamed itself the American Hockey League and declared itself a major league, to the anger of NHL president Frank Calder, who branded the league an outlaw league.

In 1931–32 season, their second, the Shamrocks won the league championship. Convinced they should be given a chance to play for the Stanley Cup, they petitioned the Cup trustees for that opportunity. However the trustees would have to convince the NHL to accept that challenge and the NHL would not. Perhaps frustrated by this, Norris once again looked to join the NHL.

In May 1932, the Detroit Falcons of the NHL declared bankruptcy, and Norris used that opportunity to convince the NHL he could take over the team. The NHL agreed on the condition that he disband the Shamrocks who were a thorn in the side for the Chicago Blackhawks. So he disbanded the Shamrocks and took three of the best players with him to Detroit. He renamed the Detroit team to the Red Wings. The American Hockey League reverted to the American Hockey Association after this and once again demoted itself to minor league status.

== Notable players and coaches ==
- Ralph Taylor
- Eddie Wiseman
- Art Smith
- Jack Riley
- Corbett Denneny
- Mike Karakas
- Don McFadyen
- Walter Buswell
- Cecil "Babe" Dye, Head Coach
