= Chicago Cardinals (ice hockey) =

- City: Chicago, Illinois
- League: American Hockey Association
- Operated: 1926–1927
- Home arena: Chicago Coliseum

Franchise history
- 1926–1927: Chicago Cardinals / Americans
- 1927–1933: Kansas City Pla-Mors
- 1933–1940: Kansas City Greyhounds
- 1940–1942: Kansas City Americans
- 1945–1949: Kansas City Pla-Mors
- 1949–1950: Kansas City Mohawks

Championships
- Playoff championships: 1930, 1933, 1934, 1946, 1947

The Chicago Cardinals were a professional ice hockey team playing in the American Hockey Association. The team only played one season in the league. It was notable because it was founded by Eddie Livingstone, a Toronto businessman, who had owned an ice hockey team in the National Hockey Association (NHA) and whose actions led the owners of the NHA to disband the league and form the National Hockey League (NHL) in 1917. Livingstone formed the Cardinals in an attempt to bring about a rival league to the NHL. Because of the Cardinals, the NHL attacked the AHA and attempted to steal its players. The Cardinals would fold under pressure on the league and the team. Livingstone would attempt to recoup his losses by selling the team, but this was denied. He later tried to sue for damages.

== History ==
The American Hockey Association was founded in October 1926. Livingstone purchased the Chicago franchise.. Livingstone was president of the franchise and Nip Dwan was the coach. Training camp was secretly at the Mutual Street Arena in Toronto. After the NHL caught wind of the franchise, the AHA president asked Livingstone to limit his ownership to only one season. Livingstone refused and the team began to play at the Chicago Coliseum.

The game of ice hockey was new to Chicago and a price war broke out between the Cardinals and the Black Hawks. NHL president Calder declared the NHL-AHA co-operation agreement void and declared that two players of the Cardinals belonged to other teams. McLaughlin began asking players to break their contracts and leave the team. The AHA found that Teddy Graham had broken a valid contract and was fined the amount of the difference between his Cardinals' contract and his contract with London, Ontario Ravens of the Ontario Senior League.

The price war sent the Cardinals into financial difficulty and the team was sold in March 1927 to a syndicate of Chicago businessmen, led by Harry Herendeen, a Chicago miller, which intended to continue the team as the "Chicago Americans." The team played two games against the Duluth Hornets under the new ownership. However, the league did not approve the transfer and Livingstone suspended the team on the day of a game with St. Paul. The Coliseum announced that the ice hockey team was in arrears on its rent. Livingstone said the rejected new club owner had agreed to pay the rent.

After the 1926–27 season, the AHA wanted to negotiate a new agreement with the NHL, setting out the rules for how the leagues would work together. NHL president Frank Calder threatened not to sign an agreement while the AHA was working with Livingstone. On August 24, 1927, the AHA terminated Livingstone's membership in the league. When Livingstone tried to sell the franchise, he was told that he did not have one to sell and that four of his players (Bobby Burns, the suspended Teddy Graham, Ralph Taylor and Marvin Wentworth) were now the property of the Black Hawks. In December 1927, he filed a $700,000 lawsuit against Frederic McLaughlin, owner of the Black Hawks, and two other members of the Black Hawks, charging them with tampering with his players and claiming that his team was taken away from him through a conspiracy.

The suit went to trial in September and October 1930. A mistrial was declared on October 2, after a juror discussed the case with McLaughlin. The suit was withdrawn on October 10 after a motion by Livingstone's lawyer, objecting to the lack of evidence he was allowed to present. In January 1931 filed suit again, against McLaughlin and 17 other defendants for $750,000 alleging a conspiracy to wreck his team. This suit did not proceed to trial.

== Season record ==
The team won its first game 3–0 versus the Detroit Greyhounds at the Chicago Coliseum on November 21, 1926, before 3,000 fans. The crowd was less than half the size of the crowd which had turned out for the Black Hawks' home opener the week before. Winston Fisher recorded the shutout, and Gord Brydson scored the team's first goal.

	GP	W	L	T	GF	GA	P
1926–27	37	11	24	2	52	73	24

Club folded on March 21, 1927.

== Players ==
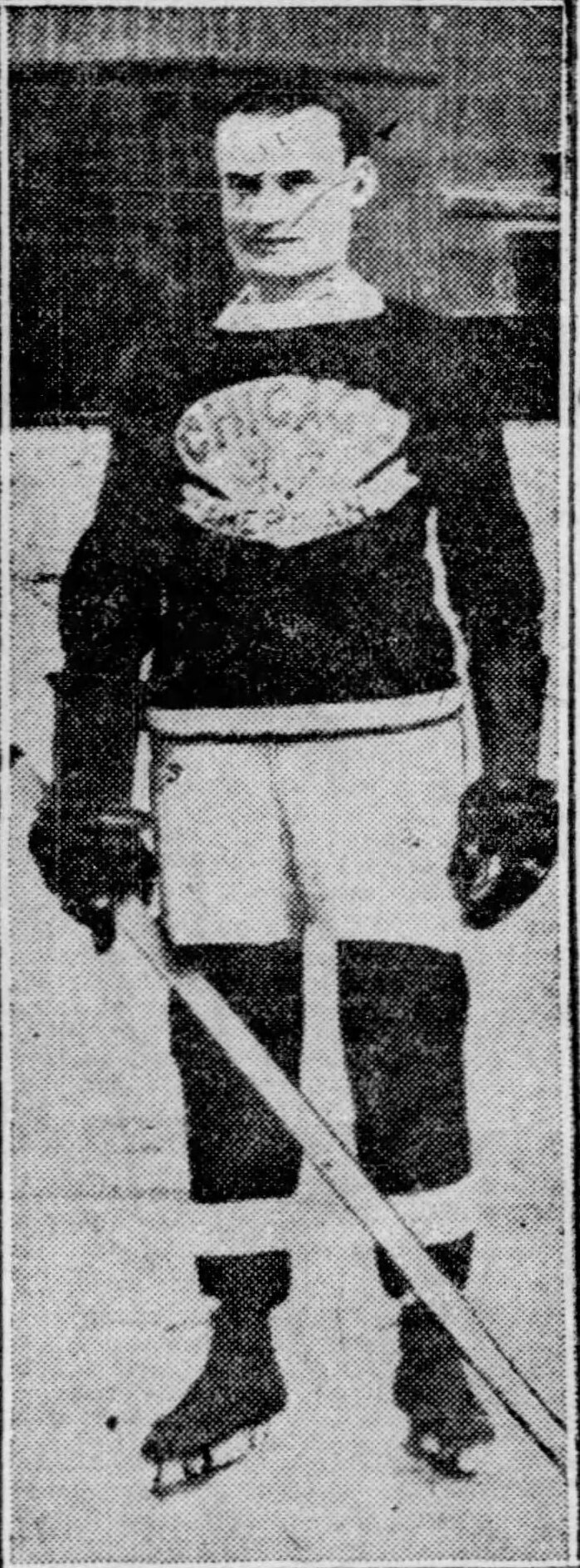
Harry Reid in uniform

Most of the players were making their professional debuts, having been selected from the amateur ice hockey ranks in Ontario by Livingstone. Several of the players would go on to minor league careers and several played in the NHL.

Skaters
Player	Pos	GP	G	A	Pts	PIM
Roy Lessard	LW	26	11	6	17	21
Gord Brydson*	RW	32	10	3	13	23
Cy Wentworth*	D	34	8	4	12	40
Bobby Burns*	LW	33	6	3	9	20
Harry Reid	C	22	4	2	6	21
Art Clark	LW	32	4	1	5	20
Ralph Taylor*	D	29	4	1	5	57
Russ Stephenson	LW	27	3	0	3	6
Teddy Graham*	D	22	1	1	2	23
Gerry Munro*	D	10	0	2	2	2
Jim Seaborn	D	6	0	2	2	10
Stewart Dunning	RW	21	1	0	1	8
Mike Brophy	LW	13	0	0	0	4
Jack McVicar*	D	6	0	0	0	2

Goaltenders
Player	GP	W	L	T	Min	GA	SO	GAA
Alfie Moore*	12	4	7	1	738	22	2	1.79
Winston Fisher	22	7	14	1	1330	51	4	2.30

^{*} Played in the NHL

Source: Society for International Hockey Research
