= Eddie Livingstone =

Canadian sports manager (1884–1945)

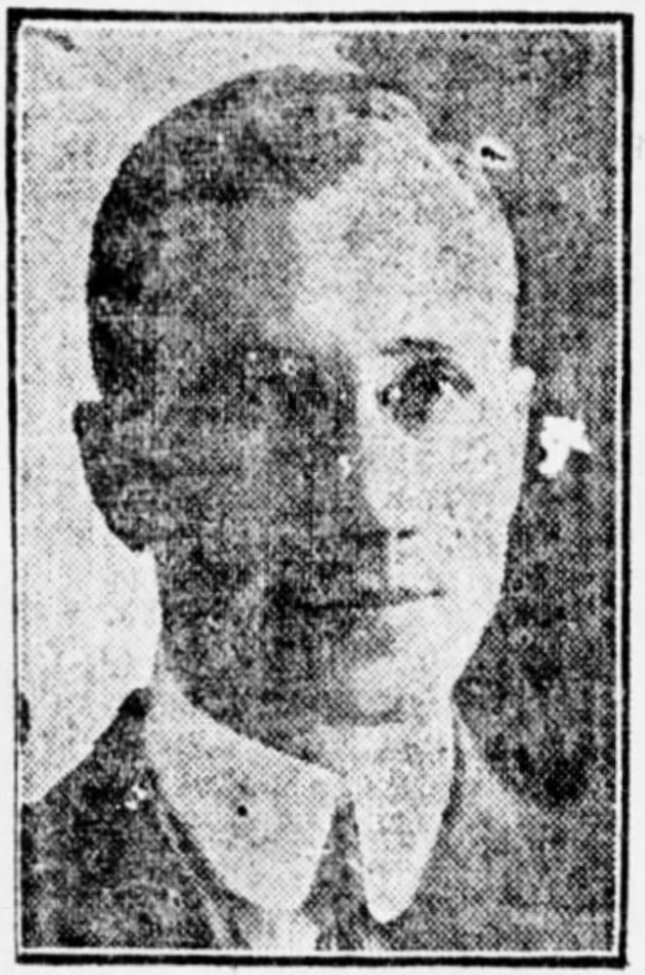
- Livingstone c. 1917
- Born: September 12, 1884; Toronto, Ontario, Canada
- Died: September 11, 1945 (aged 60); Toronto, Ontario, Canada
- Known for: Ice hockey executive, team owner and coach

Edward James Livingstone (September 12, 1884 – September 11, 1945) was a Canadian sports team owner and manager. He was the principal owner of the Toronto Shamrocks and the Toronto Blueshirts professional ice hockey clubs of the National Hockey Association (NHA), where his battles with his fellow owners led them to create the National Hockey League.

== Early years ==
Livingstone was born in Toronto, Ontario, to David and Ruth Livingstone, the youngest of three children. He played junior and intermediate ice hockey with the St. George's Club in Toronto, before becoming an Ontario Hockey Association referee. He also covered ice hockey for the Toronto Mail and Empire, often reporting on the games he refereed.

Livingstone became manager of ice hockey and football at the Toronto Rugby and Athletic Association (TR & AA). The club, formed after a split from the Toronto Amateur Athletic Club, competed in the Ontario Hockey Association and won the John Ross Robertson Trophy as senior ice hockey champions of Ontario in 1913 and 1914.

== National Hockey Association ==
His success in amateur hockey prompted Livingstone to make the jump to the professional game by buying the struggling Toronto Ontarios of the National Hockey Association (NHA). During the 1914–15 season, the Ontarios traded in their orange sweaters for green and were renamed the Toronto Shamrocks. The team skated to a record of 7 wins and 13 losses, an improvement of three games over the 1913–14 campaign.

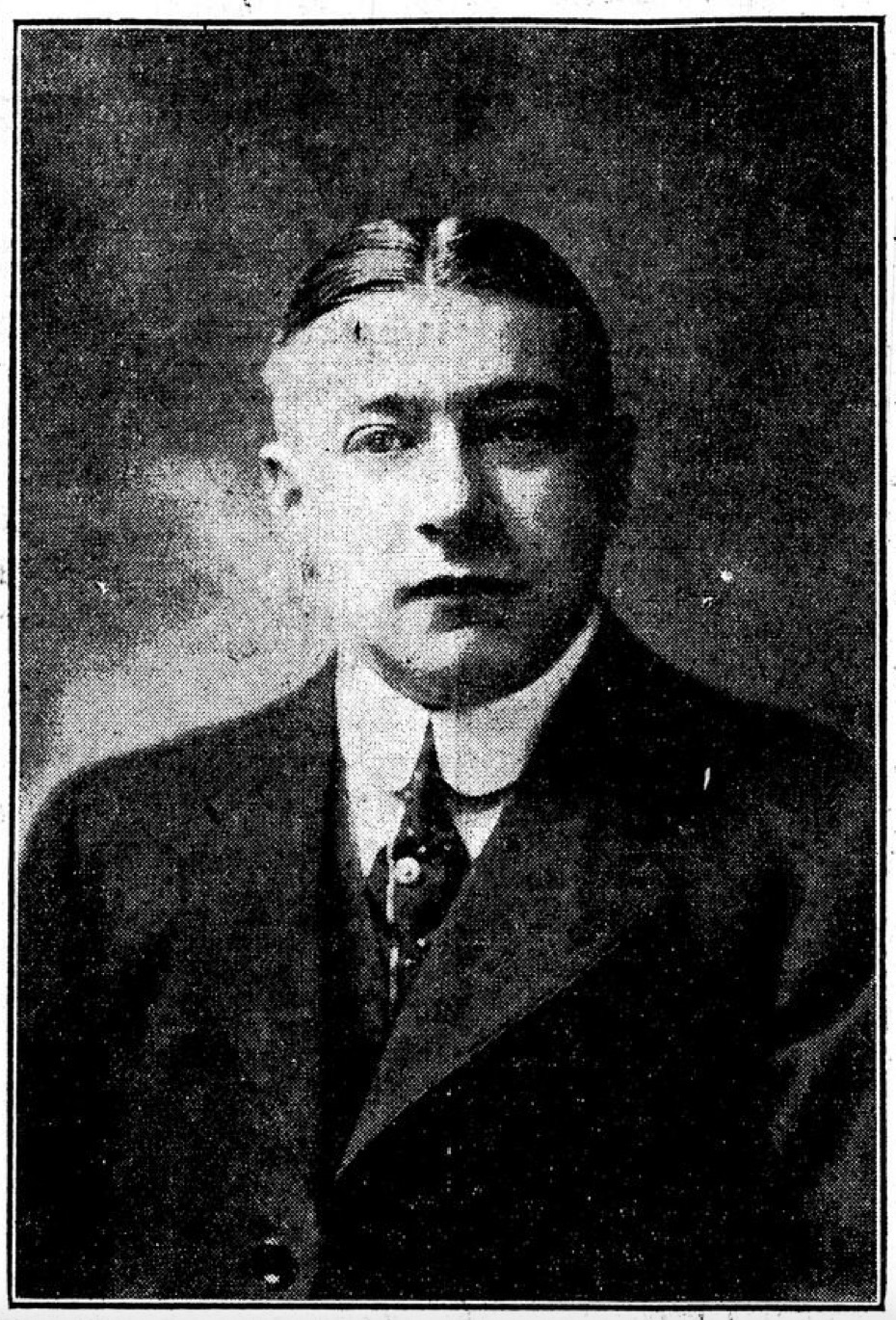
Sammy Lichtenhein, owner of the Montreal Wanderers, with whom Livingstone feuded for many years.

During the 1914–15 season, on February 3, 1915, Sammy Lichtenhein's Montreal Wanderers were awarded a game by forfeit over the Shamrocks. The Shamrocks had told the league that they could not put a full team on the ice without George McNamara and Howard McNamara, who were at the bedside of their ill father. Livingstone asked for a postponement, but Lichtenhein refused and the league ruled the game forfeited. In a gesture of sportsmanship, Lichtenhein then made an offer to reschedule the game and play the Shamrocks on March 6, 1915. Shortly after, with the Wanderers and Ottawa in a tight two-way race for the league championship, Livingstone demanded that Lichtenhein follow through on his offer to play the forfeited game. Lichtenhein was incensed and threatened to have Livingstone thrown out of the NHA. The Wanderers and Ottawa ended the season tied for first place. The NHA executive met on March 4 and decided to recognize the forfeit and not order the Wanderers to play the Shamrocks (the Wanderers were told to pay the Shamrocks $300—the amount they saved by not having to travel to Toronto in February). Instead, a two-game, total-goals series was scheduled between Montreal and Ottawa to determine the champion. The league also rejected Lichtenhein's request to have Livingstone expelled from the NHA. Livingstone and Lichtenhein would continue to feud for years. At one meeting during the 1916–17 campaign, Lichtenhein grew so infuriated that he offered Livingstone $3,000 to abandon his team. Livingstone countered with a $5,000 bid for Lichtenhein to shut down his Wanderers.

Before the 1915–16 season, Frank Robinson sold the Toronto Blueshirts — the NHA's other Toronto franchise — to Livingstone. The NHA did not want one owner to have two clubs in the league, and Livingstone said that he would sell the Shamrocks; however, Frank Patrick and Lester Patrick of the Pacific Coast Hockey Association, who had accused the NHA of reneging on an agreement with their league, raided the Blueshirts and signed away most of the team's players. To fill the holes in his lineup, Livingstone transferred Shamrocks players to the Blueshirts, but that left him with little to sell in the Shamrocks. When he had not sold the team by the November 20, 1915, deadline set by the league, the NHA seized the franchise and kept it dormant for the season. Before the season began, Livingstone argued with the owners of Arena Gardens over the terms for the use of their facility and threatened to move his team to Boston. The NHA said that it would not allow the move.

During the 1915–16 season, Livingstone is credited with fielding the first two-line forward team in a game between Toronto and Ottawa.

The 1916–17 campaign was a stormy one for the NHA. Canada intensified its contribution to World War I, and a number of pro and amateur hockey players volunteered for military service. The 228th (Northern Fusiliers) Battalion, CEF of the Canadian infantry formed a team in the NHA, taking the place of the suspended Toronto Shamrocks franchise and sharing Arena Gardens with the Blueshirts. Meanwhile, Livingstone lost several of his Blueshirts to the war effort: Harry Cameron, George McNamara, Howard McNamara, and Percy LeSueur. Keats had also joined the 228th, and Livingstone protested to the league about the loss of his star player. The two clubs eventually reached an agreement where Keats was returned to the Blueshirts in exchange for the right to use LeSueur. Another of Livingstone's stars, Cy Denneny, had found full-time employment with the government in Ottawa and told the team that they could either trade him to Ottawa or he would sit out the season. Livingstone said that he would not accept anyone but Frank Nighbor in a trade, or Ottawa could buy Denneny for $1,800—more than double the NHA record for a player sale. He then suspended Denneny in November for refusing to report. Livingstone also offered to take goaltender Clint Benedict for Denneny, but that offer was also rejected by Ottawa. Late in January 1917, it seemed that Livingstone had traded Denneny to the Montreal Wanderers for goaltender Billy Hague—Denneny even signed an agreement with Montreal—but Livingstone backed out of the deal with his nemesis Sammy Lichtenhein. Livingstone ultimately capitulated and sold Denneny to Ottawa, but not before raising the ire of Tommy Gorman in Ottawa and Lichtenhein in Montreal.

The Globe was not against the removal of Livingstone, in this editorial of February 13, 1917.

=== Expulsion from NHA ===
On February 8, 1917, the 228th Battalion got its orders to proceed overseas and withdrew its teams from the OHA and the NHA. Three days later, NHA owners—at a meeting that did not include Livingstone—voted to suspend the Blueshirts franchise to keep the number of teams in the league even. Toronto players were put in a lottery and claimed by other teams, although they were to be returned to Toronto when the franchise was reinstated. On February 13, Livingstone issued a statement that he was through with the NHA and that the Blueshirts franchise was available to the highest bidder. Livingstone was going to work on the opening of several arenas and a new hockey league in the United States.

Livingstone filed suit against the league and the other owners, and applied for a court injunction to prevent them from moving the remaining teams out of the league.

In October 1917, Quebec Bulldogs manager Mike Quinn told the Quebec Telegraph that the Toronto club had been given three weeks to separate itself from Livingstone with the threat that the other owners would operate without Toronto if the club did not comply. There was no response by the deadline.

At its annual meeting in November 1917, the NHA announced that it was suspending operations because of the difficulties in running a five-team league and the player shortages introduced by conscription in Canada during the off-season. About a week later, all of the owners other than Livingstone announced that they had formed a new league, the National Hockey League. Livingstone was shut out of the new league, but the NHL retained the contracts of the Toronto franchise players.

The Arena Company was awarded a temporary NHL franchise for Toronto and was assigned Livingstone's players for the NHL's inaugural 1917–18 season on an undetermined 'lease' basis. The club—which the press and fans called the "Torontos" or "Blueshirts"—would have a successful season, and won the Stanley Cup. The Arena Company did not pay for the players and Livingstone filed suit for the revenue earned with the players, now inflated by the Cup success.

In 1918, Livingstone and Percy Quinn attempted to force the NHA to restart by forcing a shareholder's meeting, where he hoped that the minority position of the Brunswick Company in the Montreal Canadiens would disallow their vote and swing the vote his way. The NHA owners shot down the plan at what would be the final meeting of the NHA owners in December 1918, voting instead to permanently suspend the NHA, although the organization could not fold completely while it had ongoing legal actions pending against the Canadian military.

=== Legal battles with the Arena ===
Having been cast aside by his former business associates, Livingstone spent the next several years in court, in a bid to be compensated for the loss of his franchise and his players. In February 1918, the courts ruled that the NHA and its owners had not acted improperly in suspending operations of Livingstone's Toronto Hockey Club. The decision was appealed and upheld by the Supreme Court of Canada on November 19, 1919. Mounting legal bills from the dispute forced the Arenas to sell most of their stars, resulting in a horrendous five-win season in 1918–19. The Arenas were forced to suspend operations after their 18th game.

While this legal action was playing out, the Arena Company returned its temporary franchise to the NHL, but refused to return Livingstone's players to him for the 1918–19 season. Instead, it formed a new team, the Toronto Arena Hockey Club—popularly known as the Toronto Arenas, with Gardens auditor Hubert Vearncombe as team president. This new team was a self-contained corporation that could exist separately from any legal action, and was thus beyond the reach of Livingstone. The newly minted Arenas were readily admitted to the NHL as a full member in good standing, and continued to use Livingstone's players. This resulted in another lawsuit being filed, this one against Arena Gardens, Vearncombe and Arena Hockey Club general manager Charlie Querrie. Arena Gardens argued that Livingstone did not own the NHL rights to the players and could not have suffered any damages. The court ruled in Livingstone's favour in January 1920 and awarded $20,000 in damages back-dated to April 1918, but the issue was not settled. Before the end of the year, under the weight of the judgment against it, Arena Gardens went into receivership. Meanwhile, the Arena Hockey Club was sold to a group headed by Querrie, who renamed it the Toronto St. Patricks.

In October 1923, a ruling was made that Arena Gardens had abused its position as a trustee of the assets of the Toronto Hockey Club—its player contracts—and finding damages of $100,000 in favour of Livingstone. That still was not the end, as the damages were later reduced to $10,000 and that decision was also appealed—all the way to the privy council, which dismissed the appeal in July 1926.

== Attempts to launch rival leagues ==
When the rights to his players reverted to him in 1918, Livingstone announced plans to launch the Canadian Hockey Association as a rival to the NHL. The league would include the former NHA team from Quebec, now owned by Percy Quinn, the founding president of the Toronto Hockey Club. Livingstone also received support from Tom Wall, the former owner of the Toronto Ontarios.

In the summer of 1920, there was again talk that Livingstone might get the CHA off the ground, particularly after Percy Quinn was made managing director of Arena Gardens on June 17. Livingstone was looking at starting an international hockey league with franchises in the U.S. and Canada, but the CHA was again thwarted when the NHL moved its struggling Quebec franchise to Hamilton, Ontario which Livingstone had targeted as a prime market.

In 1924, Livingstone again announced that he was forming an international league that would have teams in Toronto, Ottawa, New York, Brooklyn, and Buffalo. It was never launched.

In February 1926, Livingstone announced the creation of the International Professional Hockey League, of which he was president. The IPHL was to have teams in Toronto, Buffalo, and Detroit, and two teams in both New York and Chicago. Nothing ever came of the league.

== American Hockey Association ==
In 1926, Livingstone acquired an American Hockey Association franchise for Chicago, the Chicago Cardinals. He negotiated a deal to play at the Chicago Coliseum, the same arena that the fledgling Chicago Black Hawks of the National Hockey League used for its home games. In March 1927, Livingstone tried to sell the team to Harry Herendeen, a Chicago miller, but the league did not approve the transfer. Late in the season, the Coliseum refused to give Livingstone's team ice time, citing non-payment of rent. Livingstone said the rejected new club owner had agreed to pay the rent.

After the 1926–27 season, the AHA wanted to negotiate a new agreement with the NHL, setting out the rules for how the leagues would work together. NHL president Frank Calder threatened not to sign an agreement while the AHA was working with Livingstone. On August 24, 1927, the AHA terminated Livingstone's membership in the league. When Livingstone tried to sell the franchise, he was told that he did not have one to sell and that four of his players (including Marvin Wentworth, who would play 13 seasons in the NHL) were now the property of the Blackhawks. He filed suit against Frederic McLaughlin, owner of the Blackhawks, charging him with tampering with his players and in December 1927 filed a $700,000 lawsuit against Calder and three AHA executives claiming that his team was taken away from him through a conspiracy.

== Ontario Hockey Association ==
Livingstone returned to Toronto and gave up professional hockey for the amateur game. In 1929–30, he started coaching the Toronto Victorias junior team in the Ontario Hockey Association. Starting in the 1931–32 season, the team was affiliated with the Lions Club and renamed the Toronto Lions. They played at Maple Leaf Gardens. Even there, controversy followed him. In November 1933, the OHA ordered three of his players to play with their high school teams for the 1933–34 season. Livingstone charged that the move was taken deliberately against him. In the 1934–35 season, his players included future hall-of-famer Gordie Drillon. He continued to coach the team through the 1938–39 season.

Livingstone outlived his enemies Sam Lichtenhein, who died in 1936, Frank Calder, who died in 1943, and Fred McLaughlin, who died in 1944. Livingstone died the day before his 61st birthday in 1945.
