= Emmett Quinn =

Canadian ice hockey coach

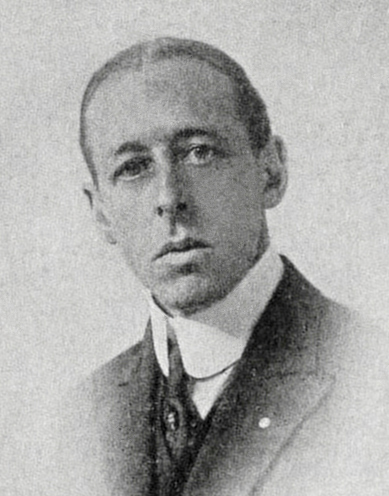
- Born: September 10, 1877; Montreal, Quebec, Canada
- Died: February 9, 1930 (aged 52); Montreal, Quebec, Canada
- Occupation: Fire commissioner
- Known for: Ice hockey coach, executive and referee

Thomas Emmett Quinn (September 10, 1877 – February 9, 1930) was a Canadian ice hockey executive, coach and referee. Quinn served as president of the National Hockey Association (NHA), the predecessor of today's National Hockey League (NHL). His brother Percy Quinn was also an ice hockey executive. At the time of his death, Quinn was a Fire Commissioner in Montreal.

== Ice hockey career ==
Quinn first became notable in the field of ice hockey as a coach of the Montreal Shamrocks in the 1906–07 season. He was replaced after the season and worked as a referee for the 1907–08 season. He was the referee of the game, in Cornwall, Ontario in February, 1907 in which Owen McCourt died as a result of his on-ice injuries. He returned to coaching, for the Quebec Bulldogs of the Eastern Canada Amateur Hockey Association (ECHA) in 1908–09. He also served as the ECHA's secretary-treasurer.

In 1909, he was part of the dissolution of the ECHA. He became the Canadian Hockey Association's secretary-treasurer. When that league dissolved, he joined the National Hockey Association (NHA) as secretary-treasurer.

In 1910, he was appointed president of the NHA. He held the position until October 18, 1916, when he resigned. During his tenure, the league moved into Quebec and Toronto, relocating franchises in northern Ontario that had been members of the Temiscaming Professional Hockey League. Under his tenure, the league imposed a salary cap on its players. The Pacific Coast Hockey Association (PCHA) was founded in 1911, and it became the NHA's major competitor, albeit in western cities, while the NHA operated in eastern cities. Quinn negotiated agreements between the leagues for the first regular Stanley Cup playoffs, holding finals between the two leagues for the Cup, ending the time period of Stanley Cup "challenges" under the control of the Cup's trustees. He also negotiated agreements to respect each league's player contracts and a controlled draft for the transfer of players between the leagues.

Quinn resigned from his position as president of the NHA after the 1915–16 season. He was rewarded with a silver tea service from the NHA in October 2016. He ended his involvement with hockey entirely.

== Personal ==
Quinn had three brothers Fred, Percy and Raphael. Quinn married May Kiely. They had three children: Richard Francis Quinn, Robert Emmett Quinn and Millicent Quinn. Quinn was in the insurance business, as was his brother Percy. Quinn was nominated to the Fire Commissioner's Court in 1924 for his experience in fire hazards. He died in 1930 at 52 years of age.

== Bibliography ==
- Holzman, Morey; Nieforth, Joseph (2002). Deceptions and Doublecross: How the NHL Conquered Hockey. Toronto, ON, Canada: Dundurn Press. ISBN 1-55002-413-2.
- Ross, J. Andrew (2015). Joining the Clubs: The Business of the National Hockey League to 1945. Syracuse University Press. ISBN 9780815633839.

Sporting positions
Preceded by Mike Doheny	National Hockey Association President; 1910–1916	Succeeded by Frank Robinson
