= 1904–05 Ottawa Hockey Club season =

Ice hockey team season

1904–05 Ottawa Hockey Club
- Stanley Cup champions
- League: 1st FAHL
- 1904–05 record: 7–1–0

Team information
- General manager: Bob Shillington
- Coach: Alf Smith
- Captain: Harvey Pulford
- Arena: Dey's Arena

Team leaders
- Goals: Frank McGee (17)
- Goals against average: Dave Finnie (2.4)

The 1904–05 Ottawa Hockey Club season, the club's 20th season of play, lasted from January 7, 1905, until March 11, 1905. Ottawa won the league championship of the Federal Amateur Hockey League and successfully defended its Stanley Cup championship against all challengers.

== Off-season ==
After resigning from the Canadian Amateur Hockey League (CAHL) in January 1904, the club made plans to join the FAHL. However, before the season started, the club investigated returning to the CAHL and to helping create a merger of the FAHL with the CAHL. The teams of the CAHL were opposed to both initiatives and the club played the season in the FAHL.

Two personal tragedies occurred during the off-season. Jim McGee died in a horse-riding accident in May. The McGee family did not wish Frank to continue to play hockey with only one good eye but Frank chose to play the season. Harvey Pulford's wife Annis died giving birth to a son in December 1904.

In December 1904, the Ottawas signed an agreement to return to Dey's Rink for season and Stanley Cup play. The Ottawas had been unhappy with the Aberdeen Pavilion and the Dey's Rink management agreed to arena improvement.

Bouse Hutton was ruled ineligible by the Canadian Amateur Athletic Union (CAAU) to play amateur ice hockey. He had played with the Ottawa Capitals Lacrosse Club, which was ruled to be a professional team. In addition, he had a severe case of quinsy. Hutton retired from ice hockey, continuing in lacrosse. Dave Finnie took his place.

Harry Westwick who also had played lacrosse, was deemed eligible by the CAAU to play ice hockey for Ottawa, but was considered a professional by the Ontario Hockey Association (OHA). This meant the cancellation of an exhibition between the Toronto Marlboros and Ottawa prior to the season as Ottawa refused to play without Westwick. The Dey's Rink still charged the Marlboros for rental of the rink.

Suddy Gilmour did not return for this season, as he went to work lumbering in the Gatineaus.

== Regular season ==
The Club won the league championship with a record of seven wins and one loss. The first game, on January 7 versus the Wanderers, was attended by Albert Grey, 4th Earl Grey, the Governor-General of Canada. Grey dropped the puck for the first face-off. It was the first display of ice hockey that he attended.

=== Highlights ===
Frank McGee scored five goals against the Montagnards on February 4.

=== Final standing ===
Team	Games Played	Wins	Losses	Ties	Goals For	Goals Against
Ottawa Hockey Club	8	7	1	0	60	19
Montreal Wanderers	8	6	2	0	44	27
Brockville	8	4	4	0	34	30
Cornwall HC	8	3	5	0	18	37
Montreal Montagnards	8	0	8	0	19	62

=== Results ===
Month	Day	Visitor	Score	Home	Score
Jan.	7	Wanderers	3	Ottawa	9
Jan.	23	Ottawa	3	Brockville	5
Feb.	1	Ottawa	7	Cornwall	2
Feb.	4	Montagnards	4	Ottawa	14
Feb.	8	Brockville	0	Ottawa	7
Feb.	11	Ottawa	4	Wanderers	2
Feb.	24	Cornwall	0	Ottawa	9
Mar.	3	Ottawa	7	Montagnards	3

=== Goaltending averages ===
Name	Club	GP	GA	SO	Avg.
Finnie, Dave	Ottawa	8	19	2	2.4

=== Scoring ===
Name	GP	G
Frank McGee	6	17
Rat Westwick	8	15
Alf Smith	8	13
Hamby Shore	3	6
Angus Allen	5	4
Horace Gaul	1	2
Harvey Pulford	6	1
Arthur Moore	8	1
Billy Gilmour	1	0
Fred White	2	0

An "own goal", by Garnet McDonald of Cornwall, in the February 24, 1905 game was also recorded for Ottawa. After a shot by Hamby Shore was stopped, McDonald "in a zealous effort to clear, only batted it in."

== Stanley Cup challenges ==
=== Ottawa vs. Dawson City ===
The first interest in a challenge from Dawson City was indicated in a letter from Weldy Young to the Ottawa Citizen, in 1900. The Stanley Cup trustees received a letter from G. T. Kirkson and C. Shannon of Dawson on June 7, 1901, challenging the then-champion Winnipeg Victorias. After P. D. Ross wrote back to Dawson, nothing further was heard from the Dawson club until September 9, 1904, when Ross received a challenge from Young for a Dawson City All-Star team to challenge the Silver Seven. Ross authorized the challenge in December 1904.

In January 1905, the Dawson City Nuggets travelled 4,000 miles (6,400 km) from the Yukon to Ottawa for a best-of-three Cup challenge series. The Nuggets actually left Dawson City on December 19, 1904, and travelled on a month-long journey by dog sled (Dawson to Whitehorse), ship (Skagway to Vancouver), and train (Whitehorse to Skagway, and Vancouver to Ottawa). They were no match for the Silver Seven. Ottawa defeated them in the first game, 9–2. Numerous Stanley Cup records were then set in game two, including Frank McGee's 14 goals, which included eight consecutive goals scored in less than nine minutes, and a 23–2 rout, the largest margin of victory for any challenge game or Stanley Cup Finals game to date.

Several players playing for Dawson were from the Ottawa area. Jim Johnstone was from Ottawa. Norman Watt was from Aylmer, Quebec. Randy McLennan was from Glengarry County, Ontario and had played in a Stanley Cup challenge for Queen's University of Kingston, Ontario. Another player had Stanley Cup challenge experience: Lorne Hanna, "formerly of the Yukon", had played for Brandon Wheat City in their 1904 challenge of Ottawa.

Date	Winning Team	Score	Losing Team	Location
January 13, 1905	Ottawa HC	9–2	Dawson City Nuggets	Dey's Arena
January 16, 1905	Ottawa HC	23–2	Dawson City Nuggets	Dey's Arena
Ottawa wins best-of-three series 2 games to 0

==== Game one ====
Dawson at Ottawa, January 13, 1905
Ottawa	9	P	Dawson	2
Dave Finnie		G	Albert Forrest	
Arthur "Bones" Allen		P	Jim Johnstone	
Arthur Moore		CP	Lorne Hanna^{A}	
Harry Westwick	2	R	Randy McLennan	1
Frank McGee	1	C	Hector Smith	
Alf Smith	4	RW	George Kennedy	1
Fred White	2	LW	Norman Watt	
Referee – Harlow Stiles, Cornwall^{B}

A. Coleman lists spelling as Lorne Hanna, other spellings include Hannay (Reddick's spelling) and Hanney (in The Globe article)
B. Coleman lists E. Butterworth as referee. However, Boyle is recorded as complaining about Stiles missing off-side calls.

Source: Coleman

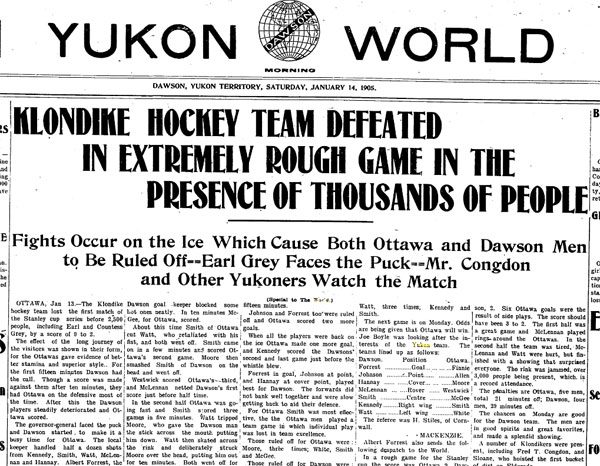
According to The Globe:

The score was 9 to 2 but Ottawa might have increased its proportions had they set to work to run up a score on the men who had travelled 4,000 miles from the far north in quest of the trophy. During the first twenty minutes of play, the challenging team made a remarkably fine showing against the champions, but after that they gradually faded away and were never seriously in the running, indicating that the chief fault with the team is that they are not in condition to stand the test of a hard battle after their long trip of 23 days from the north. While defeated to-night, it is undoubtably the fact that the team will be a different proportion in the second game on Monday.

Sources:

- The Globe
- Fischler & Resnick

==== Game two ====
Dawson at Ottawa, January 16, 1905
Ottawa	23	P	Dawson	2
Dave Finnie		G	Albert Forrest	
Harvey Pulford		P	Jim Johnstone	
Arthur Moore		CP	Lorne Hanna	
Harry Westwick	5	R	Dave Fairburn	
Frank McGee	14	C	Hector Smith	2
Alf Smith	3	RW	George Kennedy	
Fred White	1	LW	Norman Watt	
Referee – E. Butterworth, Ottawa

Source: Coleman

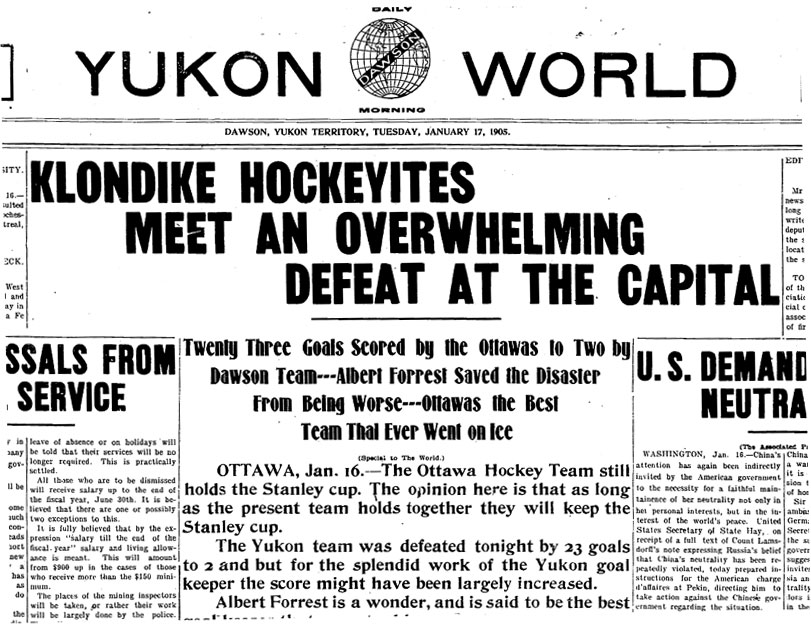
After the second game, The Globe reported:

The visiting team was outclassed to-night quite as decisively as the score indicates. In fact had it not been for the fact of Forrest's presence in the Dawson goal the score against them might have been a great deal larger. Ottawa simply skated away from them at the whistle, and continued to pile up the goals with a merciless monotonous regularity which was farcical in the extreme.

Sources:

- The Globe
- Fischler & Resnick

After the series, Ottawa held a banquet for Dawson City at the Ottawa Amateur Athletic Association (OAAA) clubhouse. There is a Stanley Cup legend that after the banquet, the Stanley Cup was drop kicked into the frozen Rideau Canal nearby and retrieved the next day. However, Bill Westwick, Ottawa Journal sports editor and the son of Silver Seven player Rat Westwick, and NHL President Frank Calder both deny it ever happened.

=== Ottawa vs. Rat Portage ===
In March 1905, the Rat Portage Thistles issued another challenge to the Senators. McGee did not play in the first game and the Thistles crushed Ottawa, 9–3. However, he returned to lead the Senators to 4–2 and 5–4 victories in games two and three, respectively. McGee returned in game two, with his good forearm wrapped in a cast, and only a light bandage on his broken wrist, to decoy the Thistles. Alf Smith scored three goals in game two on slow ice, which the Thistles claimed was salted to slow down the Thistles. There was hard ice in game three, and the lead exchanged hands several times. The Thistles led 2–1 at halftime and 3–2 midway through the second half. Ottawa took a 4–3 lead, before Tommy Phillips scored his third of the game to tie the score. However, McGee came through with the winning score late in the game to win it for Ottawa. Nearly 11,000 attended the series, and sell-outs left spectators outside of Dey's Arena.

Date	Winning Team	Score	Losing Team	Location
March 7, 1905	Rat Portage Thistles	9–3	Ottawa HC	Dey's Arena
March 9, 1905	Ottawa HC	4–2	Rat Portage Thistles	Dey's Arena
March 11, 1905	Ottawa HC	5–4	Rat Portage Thistles	Dey's Arena
Ottawa wins best-of-three series two games to one

==== Game one ====
Ottawa played game one without two of its top players: Frank McGee and Billy Gilmour. In the Montreal Gazette report, the Thistles' speed was praised, saying that "once one of the Thistle players had broken away he was hardly in any danger of being caught by an Ottawa forward." Rat Portage scored first but Ottawa scored twice to gain the lead. Si Griffis then scored three consecutive goals to put the Thistles ahead 4–2 at the half. In the second half, the Thistles continued their dominance, scoring four straight before Ottawa replied. Phillips scored his final goal to make it 9–3 for the Thistles. The game was played with two referees and the game was described as the "cleanest game played in Ottawa this season."

Lineups
Ottawa	Position	Rat Portage
Finnie	Goal	Giroux
Pulford	Point	Brown
Moore	Cover Point	Bellefeuille
Westwick	Rover	Griffis
Gaul	Center	McGimsie
Smith	Wing	Hooper
Shore	Wing	Phillips

Referee: Hartland McDougall, (asst: R. McDougall)

Goal umpires: T. Wall, R. Meldrum and Eddie Phillips

Goal summary
Team	Player	time
First half
Rat Portage	Phillips	9:00
Ottawa	Westwick	15:00
Ottawa	Shore	21:00
Rat Portage	Griffis	22:00
Rat Portage	Griffis	27:00
Rat Portage	Griffis	28:00
Second half
Rat Portage	Phillips	16:15
Rat Portage	Phillips	17:00
Rat Portage	Hooper	22:00
Rat Portage	Bellefeuille	23:00
Ottawa	Shore	26:00
Rat Portage	Phillips	26:00

Source: Montreal Gazette

==== Game two ====
The second game was played on heavy, wet, ice. This was considered a disadvantage to the Thistles, who were unable to play their style of game, having only skates suited to fast ice. Bolstered by the return of McGee and Gilmour, Ottawa played a game of "trickery and rough tactics" that they were known for. Griffis opened the scoring at 16 minutes of the first half. A minute later, Smith responded, tying the score. Hooper scored for Rat Portage two minutes later to put the Thistles again into the lead, but this was countered by two goals from Ottawa's Smith and Gilmour to put Ottawa ahead 3–2 at the half. In the second half, only Ottawa was able to score, as Ottawa's Smith completed his hat trick at 18:45 to cement the game for Ottawa. McGee did not score, but did his part to intimidate the Thistles with stick work, drawing four penalties. Dey's Rink was jammed, filled with 3,500 spectators, leaving approximately 1,000 outside on Gladstone Avenue.

Lineups
Ottawa	Position	Rat Portage
Finnie	Goal	Giroux
Pulford	Point	Brown
Moore	Cover Point	Bellefeuille
Westwick	Rover	Griffis
McGee	Center	McGimsie
Smith	Wing	Hooper
Gilmour	Wing	Phillips

Referee: Mr. M Grant

Goal umpires: Eddie Phillips, George Murphy

Goal summary
Team	Player	Time
First half
Rat Portage	Griffis	16:22
Ottawa	Smith	17:57
Rat Portage	Hooper	20:00
Ottawa	Smith	22:00
Ottawa	Gilmour	23:30
Second half
Ottawa	Smith	18:45

Source: Montreal Gazette

==== Game three ====
The third game was played on hard, fast ice unlike game two. McGee came to the fore in scoring, scoring a hat trick, including the game and Cup winner with two minutes to play. In the first half, Phillips of Rat Portage scored twice to put the Thistles ahead 2–1 at the half. Smith of Ottawa opened the scoring in the second, matched by Hooper eight minutes later. McGee and Westwick scored to put Ottawa ahead 4–3 but Phillips tied it at 4 with four minutes to play. McGee won the game with his third goal, converting a pass from Pulford with two and a half minutes to go. The Montreal Gazette report praised the quality of the game and Harvey Pulford in particular.

Lineups
Ottawa	Position	Rat Portage
Finnie	Goal	Giroux
Pulford	Point	Brown
Moore	Cover Point	Bellefeuille
Westwick	Rover	Griffis
McGee	Center	McGimsie
Smith	Right Wing	Hooper
Gilmour	Left Wing	Phillips

Referee: Mr. M Grant

Judge of Play: Shirley Davidson

Goal umpires: William Foran, Eddie Phillips

Goal summary
Team	Player	Time
First half
Rat Portage	Phillips	16:12
Ottawa	McGee	17:57
Rat Portage	Phillips	20:00
Second half
Ottawa	Smith	7:43
Rat Portage	Hooper	16:00
Ottawa	McGee	22:00
Ottawa	Westwick	23:00
Rat Portage	Phillips	25:30
Ottawa	McGee	27:00

Source: Montreal Gazette

== Ottawa Hockey Club 1905 Stanley Cup champions ==
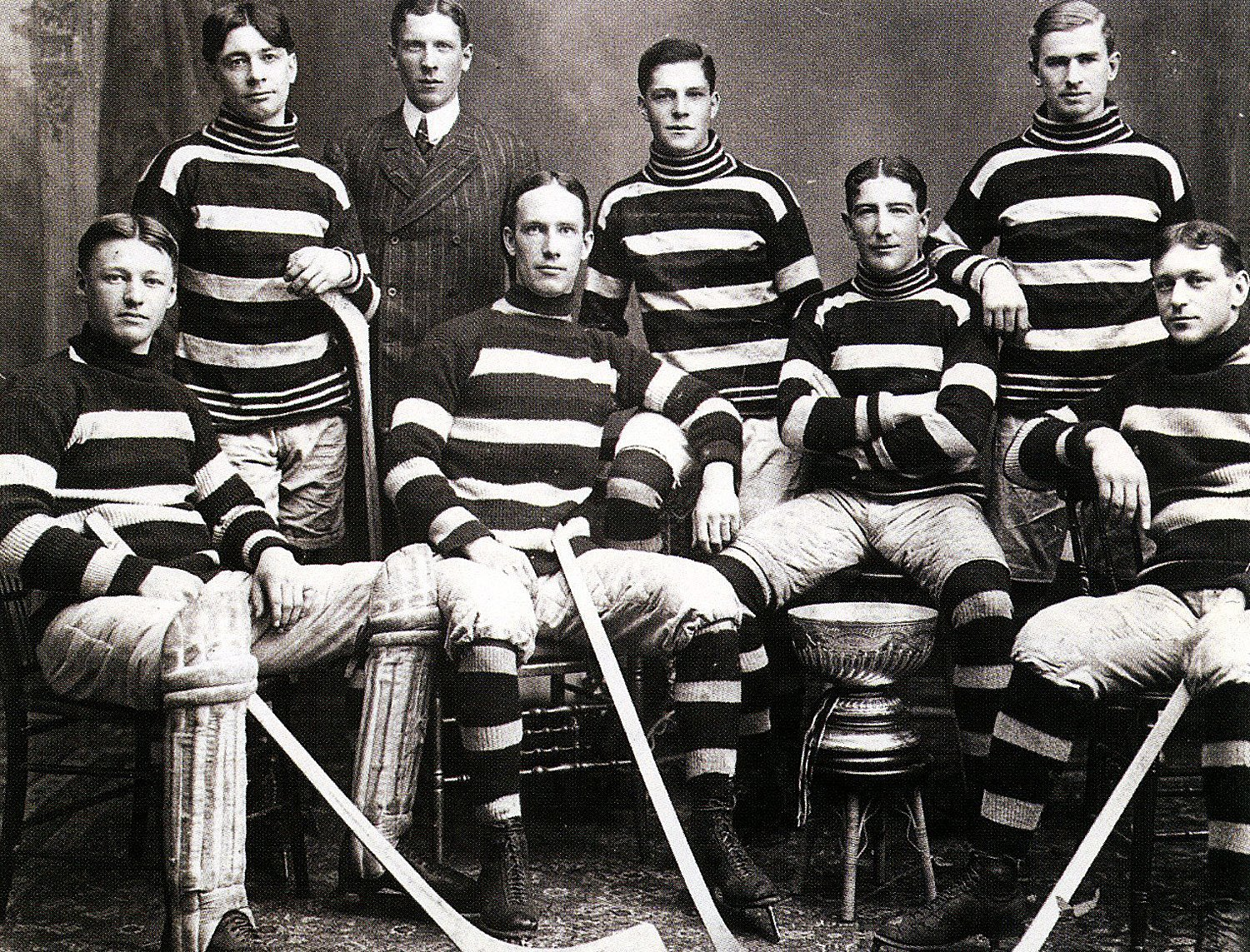
Group picture of the 1905 Ottawa "Silver Seven", Stanley Cup champions

=== Players ===
Centres

Wingers

- Horace Gaul
- Hamilton "Billy" Gilmour
- David McErnie†
- Hamby Shore
- Fred White
- Alf Smith (playing-coach)

Defencemen

- Harvey Pulford (Point-Captain)
- Arthur Moore (cover point)
- Angus “Bones” Allen (point)

Goaltenders

- Dave Finnie

† Substitute/on team picture/dressed, but did not play &-Missing from the team picture.

=== Coaching and administrative staff ===
- G.P. Murphy (President), Robert Shillington (manager)
- Patrick Baskerville (treasurer), Thomas D'Arcy McGee (secretary)
- Halder Kirby (club doctor), David Barred (team dentist)
- Llewellyn Bates, James Parick Dickson, Martin Rosenthal, Charles Sparks (directors)
- Pete Green (trainer), Mac MacGilton (ass't trainer)

=== Stanley Cup engraving ===
Weldy Young, a former member of the Ottawa team in the 1890s, and the captain of the Dawson City team, engraved his name on the Cup with a pen knife. He had missed playing for Dawson as he was working in the federal election, although he did arrive in Ottawa during the series.

== See also ==
- 1904–05 FAHL season
- List of Stanley Cup champions

Preceded by Ottawa Hockey Club; 1904	Ottawa Hockey Club; 1905 Stanley Cup Champions; 1905	Succeeded by Ottawa Hockey Club; 1906
