= 1905–06 Ottawa Hockey Club season =

Hockey Club

1905–06 Ottawa Hockey Club
- Stanley Cup champions
- League: 1st ECAHA
- 1905–06 record: 7–1–0

Team information
- General manager: Bob Shillington
- Coach: Alf Smith
- Captain: Harvey Pulford
- Arena: Dey's Arena

Team leaders
- Goals: Harry Smith (31)
- Goals against average: Billy Hague (4.2)

The 1905–06 Ottawa Hockey Club season, the club's twenty-first season, saw the Silver Seven defend their Stanley Cup championship in two challenges, but lose the Cup in a league playoff with the Montreal Wanderers. The Club moved to the new Eastern Canada Amateur Hockey Association (ECAHA) formed in 1905.

== Off-season ==
Ottawa joined with the teams of the Canadian Amateur Hockey League (CAHL) and the Wanderers of the Federal Amateur Hockey League (FAHL) to form one league with the top clubs of both leagues. The FAHL continued, but the CAHL folded.

Ottawa brought in Harry and Tommy Smith, brothers of player-coach Alf Smith. Frank McGee retired before the season, but returned to play seven of the ten games and the ECAHA playoff before retiring for good. Goaltender Dave Finnie retired and was replaced by Billy Hague.

Manager Bob Shillington sold his druggist business in November 1905 and made plans to leave for Haileybury, Ontario to join the mining business he had invested in.

== Regular season ==
Again, the league was high scoring, with Harry Smith scoring 31 goals in 8 games, and Frank McGee scoring 28 goals in 7 games.

=== Highlights ===
Harry Smith scored 6 in one game, 5 in another, topped by 8 against the Shamrocks on February 17. McGee would equal the 8 goals in a game feat against Montreal HC on March 3.

On February 25, Tommy Smith joined the club from the Ottawa Victorias of the FAHL and all three Smith players played together for the first time on the forward line with McGee.

=== Final standing ===
Playoff qualifiers in bold.

Team	Games Played	Wins	Losses	Ties	Goals For	Goals Against
**Ottawa Hockey Club**	10	9	1	0	90	42
**Montreal Wanderers**	10	9	1	0	74	38
Montreal Victorias	10	6	4	0	76	73
Quebec Hockey Club	10	3	7	0	57	70
Montreal Hockey Club	10	3	7	0	49	63
Montreal Shamrocks	10	0	10	0	30	90

=== Results ===
Month	Day	Visitor	Score	Home	Score
Jan.	6	Quebec	3	Ottawa	6
Jan.	13	Wanderers	4	Ottawa	8
Jan.	20	Ottawa	4	Montreal	1
Jan.	27	Victorias	6	Ottawa	11
Feb.	3	Ottawa	3	Wanderers	5
Feb.	10	Ottawa	10	Victorias	4
Feb.	17	Shamrocks	2	Ottawa	13
Feb.	25	Ottawa	9	Shamrocks	3
Mar.	3	Montreal	9	Ottawa	14
Mar.	10	Ottawa	12	Quebec	5

=== Goaltending averages ===
Name	Club	GP	GA	SO	Avg.
Hague, Billy	Ottawa	10	42		4.2

=== Leading scorers ===
Name	Club	GP	G
Smith, Harry	Ottawa	8	31
McGee, Frank	Ottawa	7	28
Smith, Alf	Ottawa	10	13

== Playoffs ==
=== Stanley Cup Challenges ===
The Ottawas played two Cup challenges during the regular season, defeating Queen's College of Kingston, the OHA champion, and defeating Smiths Falls the FAHL champion.

=== Queen's vs. Ottawa ===
Date	Winning Team	Score	Losing Team	Location
February 27, 1906	Ottawa	16–7	Queen's University	Dey's Arena
February 28, 1906	Ottawa	12–7	Queen's University	Dey's Arena
Ottawa wins best-of-three series 2 games to 0

=== Smiths Falls vs. Ottawa ===
In the first game, Frank McGee scored five goals, but Smiths Falls matched each score until Alf Smith scored with two minutes to play. This was the first appearance of Percy LeSueur in Stanley Cup play, playing for Smiths Falls. LeSueur was described as "one of the cleverest goal-keepers ever seen."

In the second game, over 5,000 attended the game. It turned out to be one-sided, with Ottawa outscoring Smiths Falls 4–1 in each half. McGee scored four for Ottawa, making a total of nine for the series.

Date	Winning Team	Score	Losing Team	Location
March 6, 1906	Ottawa	6–5	Smiths Falls	Dey's Arena
March 8, 1906	Ottawa	8–2	Smiths Falls	Dey's Arena
Ottawa wins best-of-three series 2 games to 0

=== ECAHA Playoff ===
As the season produced a tie for the season championship, the defending champion Ottawas and Wanderers played a two-game playoff, with the winner being awarded the Stanley Cup. The series took place on March 14 in Montreal and March 17 in Ottawa. The Wanderers would win the series 9–1, 3–9 (12–10) in dramatic fashion..

Game one

Ottawa was installed as 2–1 betting favourites, but the Wanderers upset the bookies. In the first game in Montreal, the Wanderers dominated Ottawa, as Ernie Russell got four goals, Frank Glass got three and Moose Johnson would get two for a 9–1 victory.

Game two

After the first game, the Ottawas would replace their goalie Billy Hague with the Smiths Falls goalie Percy LeSueur in to play his first game for the club. Despite being down by eight goals, interest in Ottawa for the return match was high. Rush seats on sale the day of the game produced a throng that caused the ticket seller's glass to break. The venue, Dey's Arena, was modified to hold more spectators, including setting up temporary bleachers, removing the grandstand which had been used as a press box, and the installation of a press box attached to the rafters. Over 5,400 would attend the game and the top $2 tickets were being sold for $10. Betting interest was high, including one $12,000 bet.

After twelve minutes, the first goal was scored by the Wanderers' Moose Johnson to increase the goal lead to nine. Ottawa's Frank McGee, Harry Smith, and McGee again scored before half-time, cutting the deficit to 10–4. Harry Smith would score to open the second half, followed by Rat Westwick. Then Westwick scored again to make it 10–7 before Harry Smith scored three straight goals to make the score 9–1, evening the series with ten minutes to play to tie the series, causing a five-minute standing ovation. With seven minutes to play Smith was sent off for the rest of the game and Lester Patrick would score with ninety seconds to play to put the Wanderers back in the lead. Patrick would ice the game with a goal with a few seconds to play. The Silver Seven reign was over.

The Toronto Globe called it the "greatest game of hockey ever played on Canadian ice, or any other." The Sporting News would later dub it the "Greatest Hockey Game in History." Moose Johnson would end up with the Governor-General's top hat. It had been knocked of the Earl Grey's head, and a fan had snatched it up, giving it to Johnson later in the dressing room.

Date	Winning Team	Score	Losing Team	Location
March 14, 1906	Montreal Wanderers	9–1	Ottawa	Montreal Arena
March 17, 1906	Ottawa	9–3	Montreal Wanderers	Dey's Arena
Montreal wins total goals series 12 goals to 10

Ottawa had won Stanley Cup challenges that season, which meant that the 1906 season would have two Stanley Cup holders: Ottawa until March, and Montreal Wanderers for the balance of the year.

== Ottawa Hockey Club January 1906 Stanley Cup champions ==
=== Players ===
Centres

Wingers

- Hamilton Billy Gilmour
- Harry Smith
- Harry Westwick(also played Rover)
- Jack Ebbs
- Stephen Coo Dion
- Alf Smith (playing-coach)

Defencemen

- Harvey Pulford(point-Captain),
- Arthur Moore(cover point)

Goaltenders

- Billy Hague

=== Coaching and administrative staff ===
- G.P. Murphy(President), Robert Shillington(manager)
- Patrick Basketville(treasurer), Thomas D'Arcy McGee(secretary)
- Halder Kirby(club doctor), David Barred(team dentist)
- Llewellyn Bates, James Patrick Dickson, Martin Rosenthal, Charles Sparks(directors)
- Pete Green(trainer), Mac MacGilton (ass't trainer)

No team picture including all executive has been found for 1906 Ottawa.

=== Stanley Cup engraving ===
Between 1903 and 1906 Ottawa engraved each of the ten Stanley Cup series they won, and teams they played, on the outside of the bowl. The first eight series were listed separately, but both of the 1906 series are listed together in same space.

.

== See also ==
- 1906 ECAHA season
- List of ice hockey leagues
- List of Stanley Cup champions

Preceded by Ottawa Hockey Club; 1905	Ottawa Hockey Club; Stanley Cup Champions; January 1906	Succeeded by Montreal Wanderers; March 1906
