= 1902–03 Ottawa Hockey Club season =

Canadian ice hockey club season

1902–03 Ottawa Hockey Club
- Stanley Cup champions
- League: 1st CAHL
- 1902–03 record: 6–2–0

Team information
- General manager: Bob Shillington
- Coach: Alf Smith
- Captain: Harvey Pulford
- Arena: Dey's Arena

Team leaders
- Goals: Frank McGee (14)
- Goals against average: Bouse Hutton (3.80)

The 1902–03 Ottawa Hockey Club season was the club's 18th season of play. The club would win the CAHL championship in a playoff with the Montreal Victorias to win the Club's first Stanley Cup. For their win, the players would each be given a silver nugget. From that day forward, the club was nicknamed the Silver Seven.

== Off-season ==
Defenceman and former captain Peg Duval left the team to sign with the Pittsburgh Victorias as a professional in the Western Pennsylvania Hockey League.

== Regular season ==
=== Highlights ===
This season was the first season for Frank McGee and Art Moore. McGee would place second in the league scoring race with 14 goals in six games.

The season would be a two team race between Montreal Victorias and Ottawa, splitting their matches between each other. The season ended in a tie, which necessitated a two-game playoff, won by Ottawa to win their first Stanley Cup.

=== Final standing ===
Team	Games Played	Wins	Losses	Ties	Goals For	Goals Against
Ottawa Hockey Club	8	6	2	0	47	26
Montreal Victorias	8	6	2	0	48	33
Montreal Hockey Club	7	4	3	0	34	19
Quebec Hockey Club	7	3	4	0	30	46
Montreal Shamrocks	8	0	8	0	21	56

== Schedule and results ==
Month	Day	Visitor	Score	Home	Score
Jan.	3	Victorias	4	Ottawa	3
Jan.	10	Ottawa	6	Shamrocks	1
Jan.	17	Montreal	1	Ottawa	7
Jan.	24	Ottawa	6	Quebec	8
Feb.	4	Shamrocks	2	Ottawa	5
Feb.	7	Ottawa	9	Victorias	3
Feb.	14	Quebec	6	Ottawa	1
Feb.	21	Ottawa	4	Montreal	5

=== Goaltending averages ===
Name	Club	GP	GA	SO	Avg.
Hutton, John Bouse	Ottawa	8	30	0	3.80

=== Scoring Leaders ===
Name	GP	G
McGee, Frank	6	14
Gilmour, Billy	7	10
Gilmour, Dave	4	7
Gilmour, Suddy	7	7

== Playoffs ==
Ottawa and Victorias played a two-game total-goals series.

Game one

March 7
Ottawa	1	at	Victorias	1
John Hutton		G	Archie Lockerby
Harvey Pulford		P	Billy Strachan
Arthur Moore		CP	George Fairbank
Harry Westwick		R	Russell Bowie
Frank McGee		C	Bert Strachan	1
Billy Gilmour		RW	Charles Allan
Suddy Gilmour	1	LW	Blair Russell
Dave Gilmour		C-Sub
Referee – Harry Trihey

Game two

March 10
Victorias	0	at	Ottawa	8
Archie Lockerby		G	John Hutton
Billy Strachan		P	Harvey Pulford
George Fairbank		CP	Arthur Moore
Bert Strachan		C	Frank McGee	3
Russell Bowie		R	Dave Gilmour	2
Blair Russell		LW	Billy Gilmour	1
Charles Allan		RW	Suddy Gilmour	2
Referee – Percy Quinn

Source: Ottawa Citizen

The game was played at Dey's Arena on ice that was covered in water.

== Stanley Cup challenges ==
=== Rat Portage vs. Ottawa ===
Ottawa defeated the Rat Portage Thistles 6–2, 4–2 (10–4) in a two-game, total goals series in Ottawa, March 12–14, 1903.

As the new CAHL and Cup champions, the Ottawas accepted a challenge from the Rat Portage Thistles of the Manitoba & Northwestern Hockey Association (MNWHA). Entering the best-of-three challenge series, the Thistles were younger and quicker than Ottawa; only one player on the Thistles was over the age of 20. Any chance that those factors could have helped the team was negated by soft ice conditions. Ottawa swept the series with scores of 6–2 and 4–2.

Date	Winning Team	Score	Losing Team	Location
March 12, 1903	Ottawa	6–2	Rat Portage Thistles	Dey's Arena
March 14, 1903	Ottawa	4–2	Rat Portage Thistles	Dey's Arena
Ottawa wins best-of-three series 2 games to 0

Game one

March 12
Rat Portage	2	at	Ottawa	6
Fred Dulmage		G	John Hutton
Mat Brown		P	Harvey Pulford
Tom Hooper		CP	Arthur Moore
Si Griffis		R	Dave Gilmour	1
Billy McGimsie	2	C	Frank McGee	2
Bill Martin		LW	Billy Gilmour	3
Roxy Beaudro		RW	Suddy Gilmour
Referee- Harry Trihey

Source: Ottawa Citizen

All of the goals were scored in the first half. Fred Westwick did not play due to his wife's illness.

March 14
Rat Portage	2	at	Ottawa	4
Fred Dulmage		G	John Hutton
Mat Brown		P	Harvey Pulford
Tom Hooper		CP	Dave Gilmour	1
Si Griffis		R	Frank McGee	2
Billy McGimsie	1	C	Percy Sims	1
Bill Martin		RW	Billy Gilmour
Roxy Beaudro	1	LW	Suddy Gilmour
Referee- Chauncy Kirby

Source: Ottawa Citizen

For their win, the Ottawa players would each receive a silver nugget. From that point on the team would also be known as the Silver Seven.

== Ottawa Hockey Club March 1903 Stanley Cup champions ==
=== Players ===
Forwards

- Hamilton Billy Gilmour
- Suddy Gilmour
- Harry Westwick (also played rover)
- Percy Sims
- Charles Spittal (played one game of regular season)
- Jack Smith (did not play)
- Frank McGee(also played rover)
- Dave Gilmour(also played cover point)

Defencemen

- Harvey Pulford (point-Captain)
- Arthur Fraser (point-cover point)
- Arthur Moore(cover point)
- Frank Wood (point-cover point)

Goaltenders

- John "Bouse" Hutton

=== Coaching and administrative staff ===
- Placy Mituttler (President), Robert Shillington (manager)
- Alf Smith (coach), A. Mutchamor (treasurer)
- W. Halton (Secretary), Halder Kirby (club doctor)
- Llewellyn Bates, Chauncy Kirby, Martin Rosenthal, Charles Sparks (directors),
- Mac McGilton (Ass't Trainer), Pete Green (trainer)
- Alf Smith did not play for Ottawa in 1903. However he was playing-coach for Ottawa Silver Sevens next 3 Stanley Cup winning seasons.

== See also ==
- 1903 CAHL season
- List of Stanley Cup champions

Preceded by Montreal Hockey Club; 1902	Ottawa Hockey Club; 1903 Stanley Cup Champions; 1903	Succeeded by Ottawa Hockey Club; 1904
