= Road (sports) =

Location of a sporting event away from a team's home venue

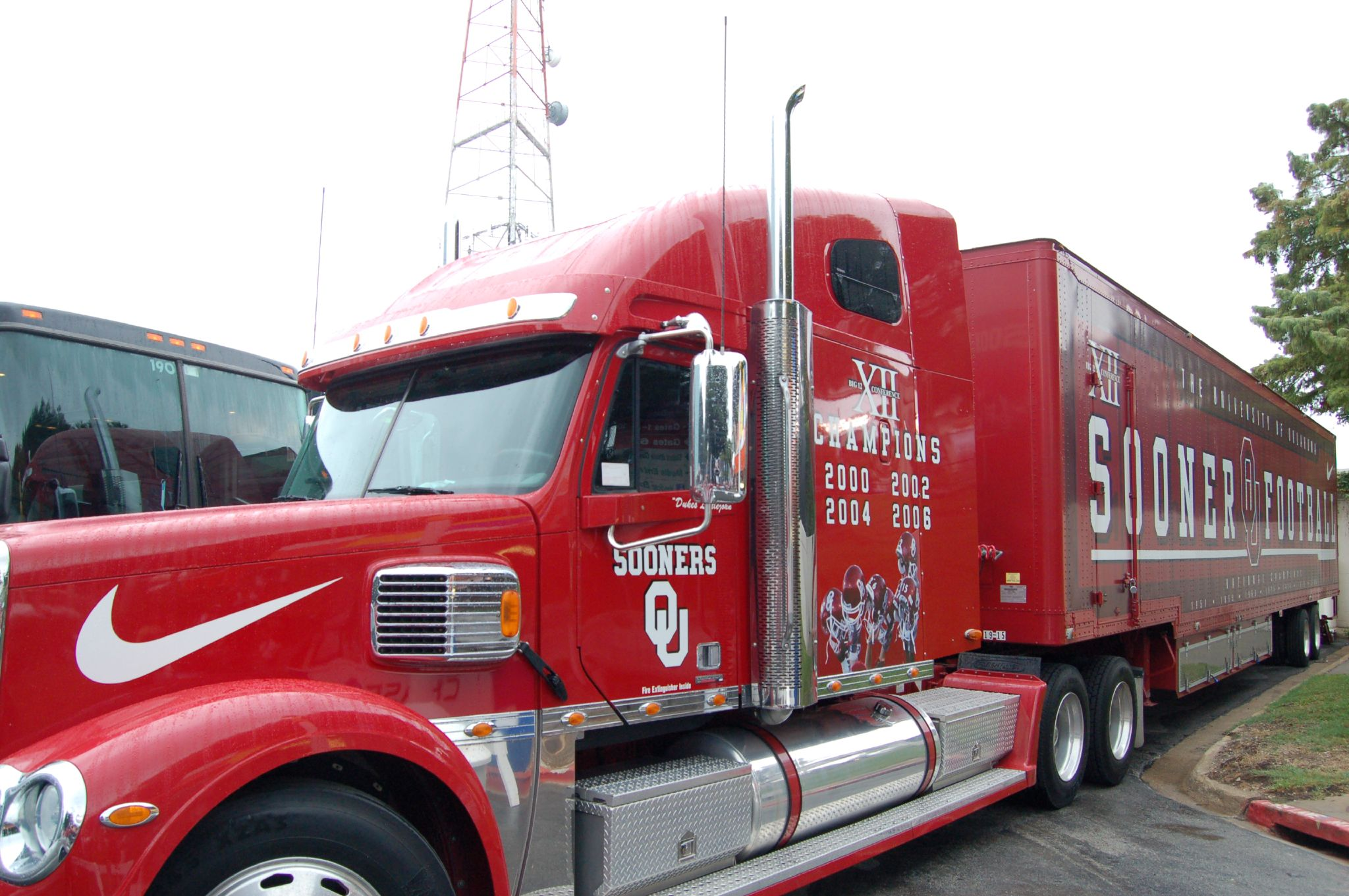
Oklahoma Sooners transport truck carries team equipment for road games.

A road game or away game is a sports game where a specified team must travel to the opposing team's home venue, meaning they must play outside of their own home venue. Most professional teams represent cities or towns and amateur sports teams often represent academic institutions. Each team has a location where it practices during the season and where it hosts games.

Thus, when a team is not hosting a game, the team is described as the road team, the visiting team, or the away team, and the game is described as a road game or an away game for that team. The venue in which the game is played is described as the visiting stadium or the road. The hosting team is said to be the home team.

The home team is often thought to have a home advantage over the visiting team, because of their familiarity with the environment, their shorter travel times, and the influence that a parochial crowd may have over an official's decisions. A home team advantage that is unique to baseball is familiarity with the home ballpark's outfield dimensions and height of the outfield wall, as well as the size of foul territory and location of in-play obstacles (e.g., a bullpen on the playing field). Major sporting events, if not held at a neutral venue, are often over several legs at each team's home ground, so that neither team has an advantage over the other.

When a team is not the host, it must travel to games (usually by bus or car, hence "road"). Teams take planes for longer journeys and often stay overnight in hotels if same-day return trips are unfeasible, due to geographical spread of the league's other teams (even intra-divisional rival teams may be quite distant from the away team's home city). Professional teams commonly use charter flights or even privately owned aircraft, since travel arrangements are often hectic, especially if back-to-back games involve an away game. For some teams that are the designated away team for several consecutive contests due to league scheduling, they embark upon extended road trips that may often be nearly two weeks away from their home. Players may occasionally have off-days during their long road trips to relax or see the sights in cities that they visit.

Historically, the longest road trip in sports (in terms of time taken, which may never be eclipsed due to modern means of travel by air) was made by the Dawson City Nuggets who embarked upon the 4,000 mile (6,400 km) journey to Ottawa over several weeks, travelling by dog sled, bicycle, foot, train, and ship. The exhausted Nuggets players were handily defeated by the Ottawa Hockey Club in the best-of-three series of the Stanley Cup challenge.

Occasionally, the road team may not have to travel very far at all to a road game, if their upcoming rival team venue is located in the same metropolitan area. In such cases the road team can practice at its own venue, while its players can stay in their in-season homes. These matches often become local derbies. A few times a year, a road team may even be lucky enough to have the road game played at their own home stadium or arena. This is prevalent in college athletics where many schools will often play in regional leagues or groundshare.

The related term true road game has seen increasing use in U.S. college sports in the 21st century, especially in basketball. While regular-season tournaments and other special events have been part of college sports from their creation, the 21st century has seen a proliferation of such events. These are typically held at neutral sites, with some of them taking place outside the contiguous U.S. (as in the case of the Great Alaska Shootout and Maui Invitational), outside the country entirely (such as the Battle 4 Atlantis in The Bahamas) or even off land, as games such as the Carrier Classic and Armed Forces Classic have taken place on the deck of an aircraft carrier or the drill halls of several domestic and foreign U.S. Army bases (Major League Baseball staged a game in a temporary stadium on-base at Fort Bragg). In turn, this has led to the use of "true road game" to refer to contests played at one team's home venue.

== Association football ==
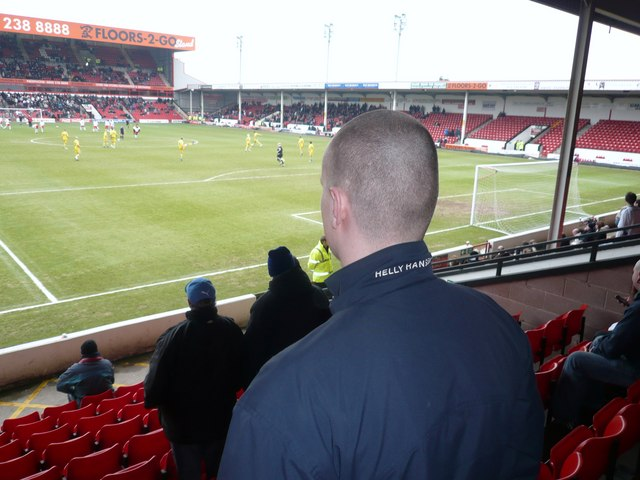
Away fans at Walsall F.C.'s Bescot Stadium

In some association football leagues, particularly in Europe, the away team's fans sit in their own section. Depending on the team's stadium, they will either sit in a designated section, or be separated from the home fans by a cordon of police officers and stadium officials. The reason of this arrangement is to prevent conflicts between fans of rival teams, which is a real concern in European association football leagues due to football hooliganism. However, in semi-professional leagues, supporters may be free to mix. When games are played at neutral sites, for instance, the FA Cup final in England, which is always played at Wembley Stadium, as well as the majority of continental tournaments, and FIFA World Cup, both teams' fans will be allotted an even number of tickets, resulting in each team occupying one half of the stadium. This is different from other sports, particularly in North America, where, for the most part, relatively few fans travel to games played away from their home stadium, with a handful of exceptions for teams with large national fan bases such as the Pittsburgh Steelers in American football or Toronto Maple Leafs in ice hockey. Home and away fans are also not separated at these games.

== See also ==
- Home (sports)
- Away colours
