= 1895–96 Ottawa Hockey Club season =

Ice hockey club season of play

1895–96 Ottawa Hockey Club
- League: 3rd AHAC
- 1895–96 record: 6–2–0

Team information
- Captain: Chauncey Kirby
- Arena: Rideau Skating Rink

Team leaders
- Goals: Harry Westwick (8)
- Goals against average: Fred Chittick (2.0)

The 1895–96 Ottawa Hockey Club season was the club's 11th season of play. Ottawa placed second in the league.

== Team business ==
At the team annual meeting, the following officers were elected:

- Hon. T. M. Daly – Honorary president
- P. D. Ross – Honorary vice-president
- A. Z. Palmer – President
- S. Maynard Rogers – Vice-president
- D'Arcy Scott – Secretary
- G. Patterson Murphy – Treasurer
- C. T. Kirby – Captain
- H. Y. Russel, H. Pulford, W. A. Cox – Executive committee

Source: "Sports of all sorts". The Globe. November 25, 1895. p. 6.

== Season ==
=== Highlights ===
After playing both goal and forward in the previous season, Harry Westwick played forward only and he responded with 8 goals. Alf Smith was close behind with 7 goals. Fred Chittick played all eight games for Ottawa.

Ottawa was the only team to defeat the Montreal Victorias, defeating them 3–2 in Montreal before 5000 fans. The Victorias won the return match in Ottawa by the same 3–2 score.

=== Final standing ===
Team	Games Played	Wins	Losses	Ties	Goals For	Goals Against
Montreal Victorias	8	7	1	0	41	24
Ottawa HC	8	6	2	0	22	16
Quebec	8	4	4	0	23	23
Montreal HC	8	2	6	0	24	33
Montreal Shamrocks	8	1	7	0	16	30

== Schedule and results ==
Day	Visitor	Score	Home	Score	Record	Notes
January
4	Ottawa	2	Shamrocks	1	1–0	
18	Montreal	1	Ottawa	3	2–0	
25	Ottawa	2	Quebec	5	2–1	
February
1	Ottawa	3	Victorias	2	3–1	
8	Victorias	3	Ottawa	2	3–2	6'00, overtime
15	Ottawa	3	Montreal	2	4–2	
29	Shamrocks	2	Ottawa	3	5–2	
March
7	Quebec	0	Ottawa	4	6–2	

== Player statistics ==
=== Goaltending averages ===
Name	Club	GP	GA	SO	Avg.
Chittick, Fred	Ottawa	8	16	1	2.0

=== Scoring Leaders ===
Name	Club	GP	G
Harry Westwick	Ottawa	8	8
Alf Smith	Ottawa	8	7
Bert Russel	Ottawa	6	4
Chauncey Kirby	Ottawa	8	3

== Roster ==
- Fred Chittick (goal)
- Chauncey Kirby
- Harvey Pulford
- Bert Russel
- Alf Smith
- Harry Westwick
- Fred White
- Weldy Young

Source: Kitchen(2008)

== See also ==
- 1896 AHAC season
