= Fred White (ice hockey) =

Canadian ice hockey player and businessman

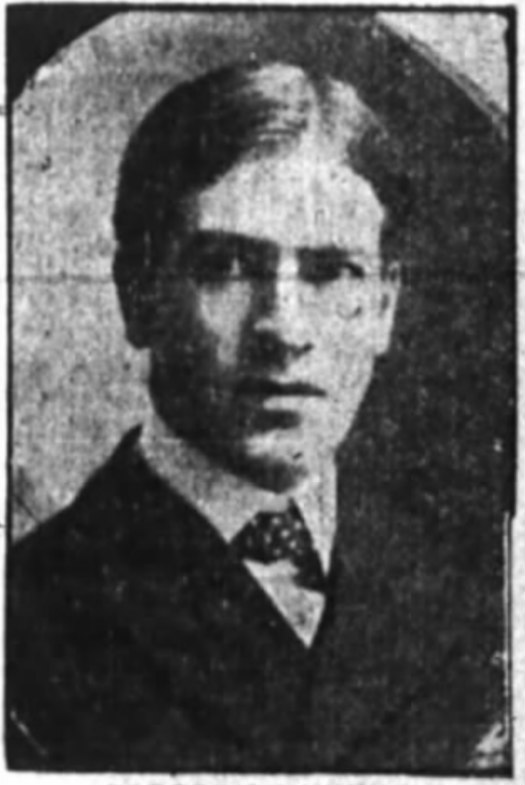
- Born: February 19, 1878 Ottawa, Ontario, Canada
- Died: May 29, 1960 (aged 82) Ottawa, Ontario, Canada
- Position: Forward
- Played for: Ottawa Hockey Club
- Playing career: 1895–1901; 1904–05

Frederick Wallis White (February 19, 1878 – May 29, 1960) was a Canadian businessman and early ice hockey player. He played for the Ottawa Hockey Club in the 1890s and 1900s. He was a member of the 'Silver Seven' team which won the Stanley Cup in 1905. He went on to a successful business career in scientific instruments.

== Career ==
Born in Ottawa, Ontario, Canada, White was the son of Col. Frank White and Clara Cluice. White attended Ashbury College and Bishop's University.

White joined the Ottawas for the 1895–96 season, when the team was an amateur team competing in the Amateur Hockey Association of Canada (AHAC). White was not a star for the team, and played with the Ottawas and various teams in the Ottawa City Hockey League. His final season with Ottawa was the 1904–05 season, joining the club for the first two games of the regular season, and the Stanley Cup challenges by the Dawson City Nuggets and the Rat Portage Thistles.

White was an employee with the Canadian Pacific Railways (CPR) before starting his own firm Ontario Hugh-Owens Company in 1913. He later was an executive with Computing Devices, Builders Sales and Kelvin-Hughes of Ottawa. White was active in local Ottawa sports with the Royal Ottawa Golf Club, Rideau Club. He was also a member of the board of governors of Carleton University.

== Career statistics ==
| | | | Regular season | | | | | Playoffs |
| Season | Team | League | GP | G | A | Pts | PIM | GP | G | A | Pts | PIM |
|---|---|---|---|---|---|---|---|---|---|---|---|---|
| 1895-96 | Ottawa HC | AHAC | 2 | 0 | 1 | 1 | 0 |
| 1896-97 | Ottawa Aberdeens (jr) | AHAC (jr) | (not available) |
| 1897-98 | Ottawa HC | AHAC | 6 | 7 | 1 | 8 | 0 |
| 1897-98 | Ottawa Aberdeens | OCHL | (not available) |
| 1897-98 | Ottawa HC | AHAC | 6 | 7 | 1 | 8 | 0 |
| 1898-99 | Ottawa Aberdeens | OCHL | (not available) |
| 1898-99 | Ottawa HC | CAHL | 4 | 2 | 1 | 3 | 2 |
| 1898-99 | Ottawa CPR | Canada Regional | (not available) |
| 1899-1900 | Ottawa Aberdeens (int) | CAHL (int) | (not available) |
| 1900-01 | Ottawa Aberdeens | CAHL (int) | (not available) |
| 1901-02 | (not available) |
| 1902-03 | (not available) |
| 1903-04 | (not available) |
| 1904-05 | Ottawa HC | FAHL | 2 | 0 | 4 | 4 | 2 |
| 1904-05 | Ottawa HC | St. Cup | | | | | | 2 | 3 | 7 | 10 | 3 |

Source: Society for International Hockey Research
