= Dawson City Nuggets =

Historic ice hockey team in Yukon, Canada

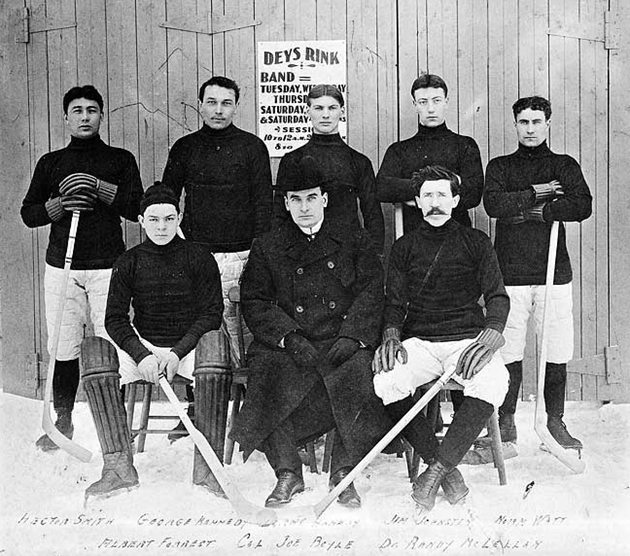
Group photo of the Dawson City Nuggets on January 14, 1905, posed outside Dey's Arena

The Dawson City Nuggets (also known as the Klondikes) were an ice hockey team from Dawson City, Yukon, that challenged the reigning champion Ottawa Hockey Club, aka "the Silver Seven", in January 1905, for the Stanley Cup. The Dawson City team was composed of hockey players from the city, most of whom did not have any elite hockey experience. The Nuggets made the 4,000 mile (6,400 km) journey to Ottawa over several weeks, travelling by dog sled, bicycle, foot, train, and ship. They arrived in time to play the best-of-three series. In the first game, Ottawa defeated Dawson City 9–2. In the second game, Ottawa defeated Dawson City 23–2 to win the series. The second game remains the most lopsided game in Stanley Cup playoff history. Ottawa's Frank McGee scored 14 goals alone in the second game, which is a record for a player in a Stanley Cup playoff game.

== 1905 Stanley Cup challenge ==
=== Background ===
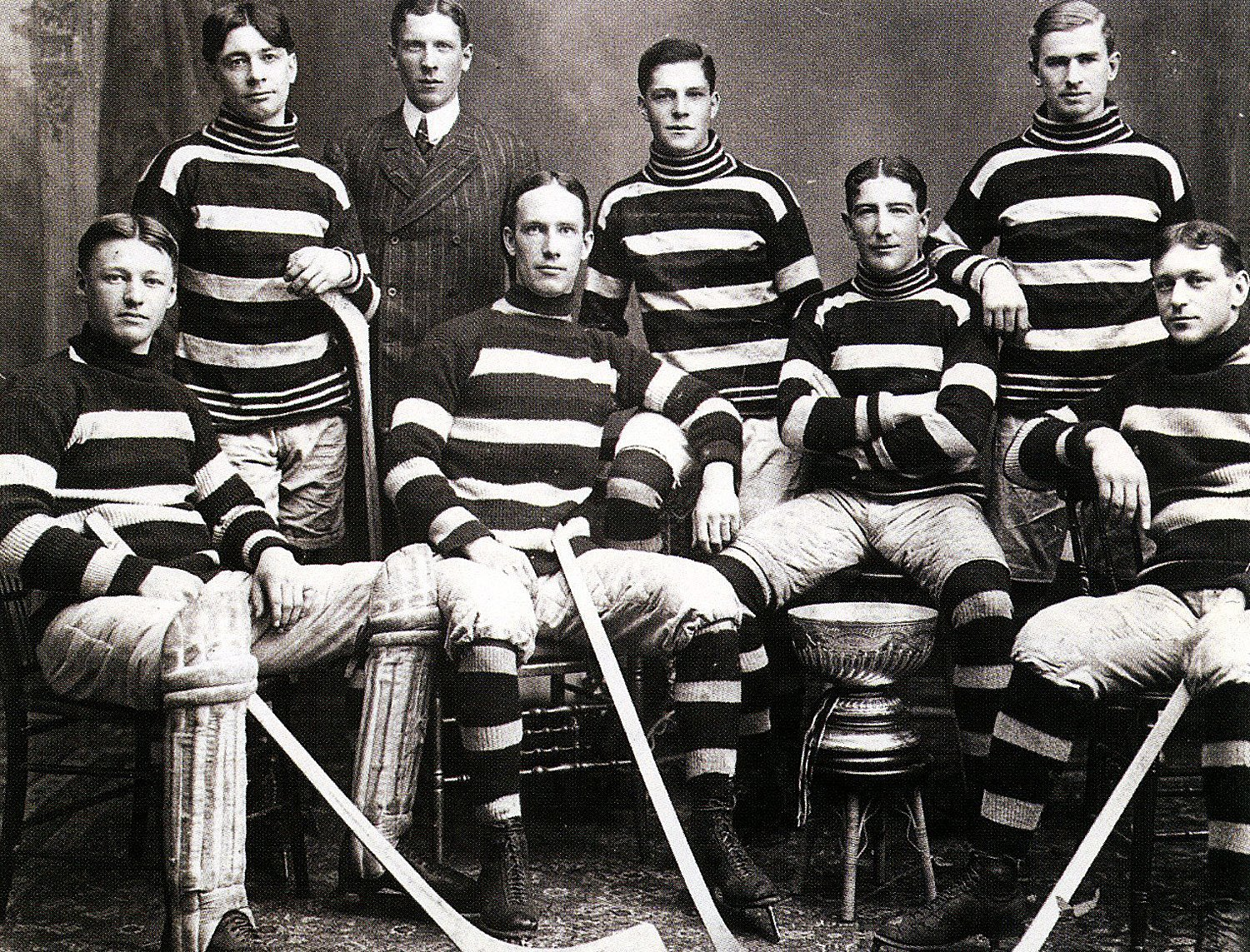
The Ottawa Hockey Club in 1905

The Nuggets issued a Stanley Cup challenge against the reigning champion Ottawa Hockey Club, known at the time as "The Silver Seven", in the summer of 1904. Ottawa accepted the challenge in October. The Dawson City team was sponsored and managed by the Klondike entrepreneur Joseph W. Boyle, and it was composed of men from the mining camps during the tail-end of the Yukon gold rush. Dawson City had two former elite hockey players, Weldy Young, who had played for Ottawa in the 1890s, and Randy McLennan, who had played for Queen's College against the Montreal Victorias in the challenge of 1895. Other players were selected from other Dawson City clubs.

The Stanley Cup trustees accepted Dawson City's challenge in the summer of 1904, with a scheduled start on Friday, January 13, 1905. It was to be a best-of-three series. The date of the challenge meant that Young had to travel later, as he had to work in a federal election that December, and meet the club in Ottawa. Some historians have since questioned why Dawson City was even granted a chance at the Cup, as Dawson City had won no championships and did not belong to any recognized senior league. On the other hand, Ottawa had considerable championship experience, having defeated all challengers since winning the Stanley Cup in March 1903.

To get to Ottawa, 4,000 miles (6,400 km) away, the Dawson City club would have to get to Whitehorse (which was approximately 600 km away) by sled, catch a train from there to Skagway, Alaska, then catch a steamer to Vancouver, and a train from there to Ottawa. On December 18, 1904, several players set out by dog sled, and the rest left the next day by bicycle for a 330-mile trek to Whitehorse. At first, the team made good progress, but the weather warmed enough to thaw the trail, meaning the players had to walk several hundred miles. The team spent the nights in roadhouses along the trail. At Whitehorse, the weather turned bad, causing the trains not to run for three days, causing the Nuggets to miss their steamer in Skagway. The next one could not dock for three days due to the ice buildup. The club found the sea journey treacherous, causing seasickness amongst the team. When the steamer reached Vancouver, the area was too fogged in to dock, and the steamer docked in Seattle. The team from there caught a train to Vancouver, and finally left Vancouver on January 6, 1905, arriving in Ottawa on January 11. However, Young would not arrive in Ottawa on time to play for Dawson.

Despite the difficult journey, the Ottawa squad refused to change the date of the first game, only two days away. Otherwise, Ottawa was hospitable. The Klondikers received a huge welcome at the train station, had a welcoming dinner, and used the Ottawa Amateur Athletic Club's rooms for the duration of their stay.

=== Series ===
Eight men played for each team during the best-of-three series. The Dawson City roster consisted of: goaltender Albert Forrest, point Jim Johnston, cover point Lorne Hannay, rovers Randy McLennan and Dave Fairburn, centre Hector Smith, left winger Norman Watt, and right winger George Kennedy. The Ottawa roster consisted of: goaltender Dave Finnie, points Bones Allen and Harvey Pulford, cover point Art Moore, rover Rat Westwick, centre Frank McGee, left winger Fred White, and right winger Alf Smith. Ottawa's Pulford, Westwick, McGee, and Alf Smith would eventually be inducted into the Hockey Hall of Fame.

The first game started decently for Dawson, being down only 3–1 at the half, but things turned ugly afterwards. Norman Watt of Dawson tripped Ottawa's Art Moore, who retaliated with a stick to the mouth of Watt. Watt promptly knocked Moore out, hitting him on the head with his stick. The game ended 9–2 for Ottawa (the Frank McGee entry says 9–3), with Alf Smith scoring a game-high four goals. The game left a poor taste in the Yukoners, who claimed that several goals were offside.

After the game, Watt was quoted as saying that "[Frank] McGee doesn't look like too much", as McGee had only scored once in the first game. In the second game of the series on January 16, McGee scored 4 goals in the first half and 10 in the second half, leading Ottawa to a 23–2 series-clinching win. This game was, and remains, the most lopsided in Stanley Cup playoff history. McGee's 14-goal game, which included eight consecutive goals scored in less than nine minutes, is still the record for the most goals scored by a single player in a Stanley Cup game or any other major senior hockey game.

After the second game, The Globe reported:

The visiting team was outclassed to-night quite as decisively as the score indicates. In fact had it not been for the fact of Forrest's presence in the Dawson goal the score against them might have been a great deal larger. Ottawa simply skated away from them at the whistle, and continued to pile up the goals with a merciless monotonous regularity which was farcical in the extreme.

Ottawa celebrated its victory by hosting Dawson at a banquet at the Ottawa Amateur Athletic Association clubhouse, after which the players took the Cup and attempted to drop-kick it over the Rideau Canal. The stunt was unsuccessful, with the Cup landing on the frozen ice, to be retrieved the next day.

The news got worse for McLennan and Watt, who were employed by the Yukon Territory gold commissioner's office when not playing hockey. The day after the second game, the Yukon Territory announced that the pair would be laid off from work, effective immediately, albeit with pay until June 30, 1905. After playing Ottawa, the Nuggets team played a series of exhibition games in the east before returning to the Yukon.

== 1997 re-enactment ==
Shortly before a 1997 re-enactment, Michael Onesi, a Whitehorse newspaper columnist, wryly commented that had the Dawson team triumphed in 1905, they would have had the longest dynasty in Stanley Cup history. Challenges normally took place in the cup-holder's town, and visiting teams could not effectively play, after the brutal journey by overland coach to Dawson, their bodies blacker than a hockey puck from all the bruises of a dog sled ride.

In 1997, a team from Dawson competed against Ottawa Senators alumni in a re-enactment of the 1905 match, this time at the Corel Centre, complete with organ music, spotlights, and other such hullabaloo. The team symbolically recreated the trip to Ottawa, though train service no longer ran between Whitehorse and the Pacific coast. Dawson managed a slight improvement in score: 18–0, with 25 shots on goal. The event was held for charity with 45 percent, the Senators' take of receipts, was contributed to the Heart Institute, while the Dawson team donated 25 ounces of gold, or the cash equivalent, to the Yukon Special Olympics, another 45 percent of the receipts. The rest was designated to Yukon Minor Hockey.
