= Billy Hague =

Canadian ice hockey player

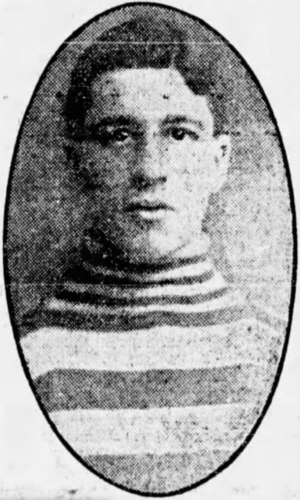
- Hague while with the Ottawa Emmetts
- Born: April 9, 1885 London, England, UK
- Died: September 9, 1969 (aged 84) Ottawa, Ontario, Canada
- Height: 5 ft 7 in (170 cm)
- Weight: 150 lb (68 kg; 10 st 10 lb)
- Position: Goaltender
- Caught: Right
- Played for: Ottawa Emmetts; Ottawa Hockey Club; Ottawa Victorias; Galt Professionals; Moncton Victorias; Halifax Socials; Montreal Wanderers
- Playing career: c. 1905–1917

William Robert Hague (April 9, 1885 – September 9, 1969)) was a Canadian amateur and professional ice hockey goaltender. He won the Stanley Cup with the Ottawa Hockey Club in 1905. He played in three other Stanley Cup challenges during his career.

== Playing career ==
Hague first played senior hockey in the Ottawa City Hockey League for the Ottawa Emmetts. He joined the Ottawa Hockey Club during the Silver Seven era, in 1905, succeeding Dave Finnie. In 1906 he was replaced by Percy LeSueur and he joined the Ottawa Victorias for the 1906–07 season. He played for the Victorias in a Cup challenge against Montreal Wanderers in 1908 losing a two-game series.

Hague later played for the Galt Professionals of the OPHL. With Galt he played in a Stanley Cup challenge against the Ottawa HC losing 7–4 in 1911. He joined the Moncton Victorias with several other Galt players, winning the Maritime championship and played in another Stanley Cup challenge in 1912 against the Quebec Bulldogs, losing a two-game series. He later played for Halifax Socials and Montreal Wanderers of the NHA. He retired after the 1916–17 season.
