= Bones Allen =

Canadian ice hockey and lacrosse player (1881–1941)

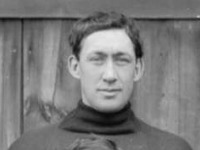
- Born: September 12, 1881 Cornwall, Ontario, Canada
- Died: June 28, 1941 (aged 59) Vancouver, British Columbia, Canada
- Height: 5 ft 6 in (168 cm)
- Weight: 155 lb (70 kg; 11 st 1 lb)
- Position: Defence
- Playing career: 1901–1909

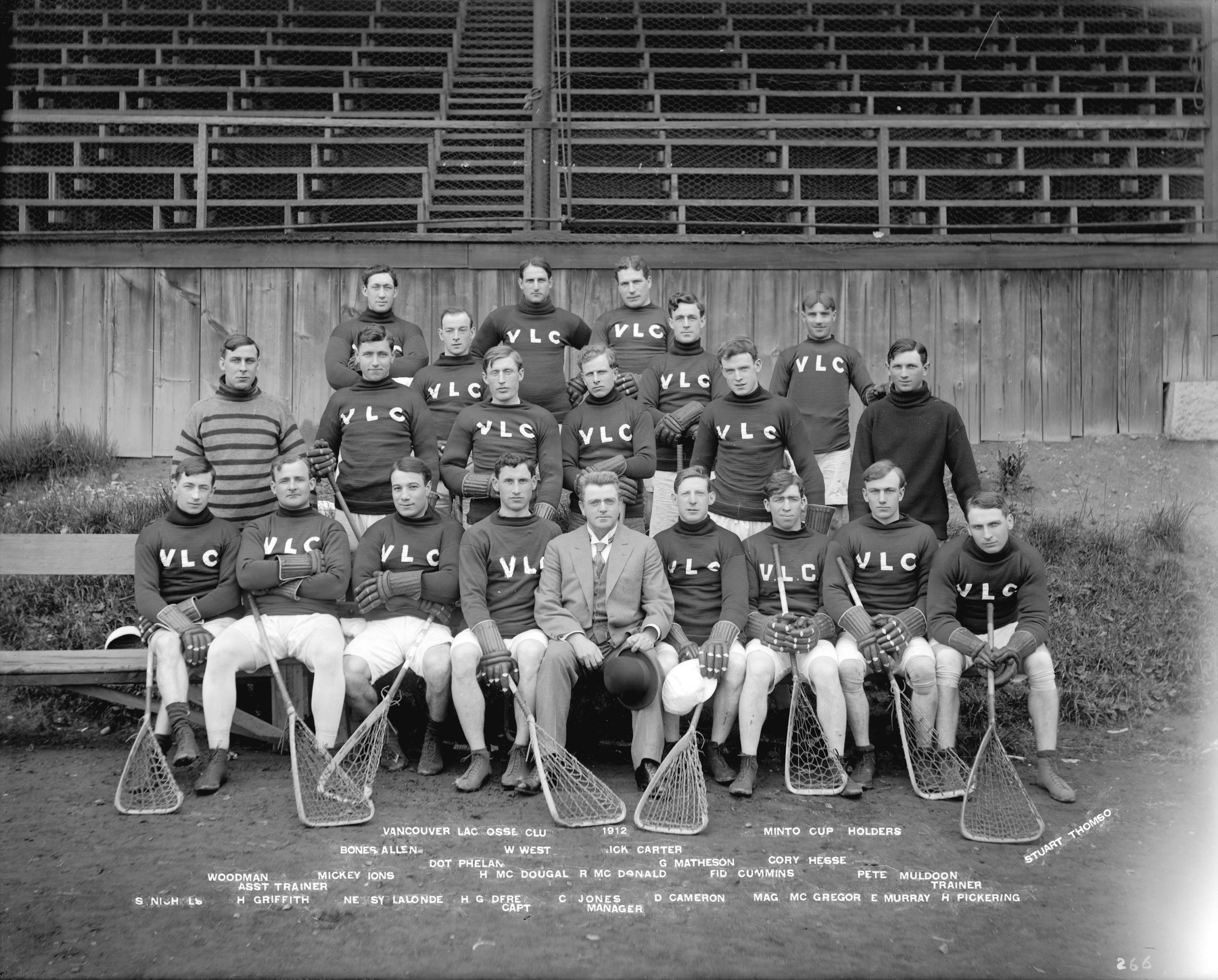
Bones Allen, at far left in the top row, with the Vancouver Lacrosse Club in 1912.

Angus J. "Bones" Allen (September 12, 1881 – June 28, 1941) was a Canadian ice hockey and lacrosse player in the early 1900s. He was a member of the Ottawa Silver Seven team which won the Stanley Cup from 1904 until 1906. Allen played in the Stanley Cup series versus Dawson City Nuggets in 1905.

== Ice hockey career ==
Born in Cornwall, Ontario, Angus became a member of the Cornwall Hockey Club in 1901. He played for the club for three seasons, in the Southern Ontario Hockey Association and in the first year of the Federal Amateur Hockey League (FAHL) in 1903–04. In 1904–05, he joined the Ottawa Hockey Club during its reign as Stanley Cup champions. He played for Ottawa only that one season. At the time, professional lacrosse paid better than ice hockey, so he concentrated on his lacrosse career. He did play one more season of ice hockey for the Cornwall Hockey Club in 1908–09 in the FAHL.

== Lacrosse career ==
Allen began playing senior lacrosse in Ontario, ca. 1898–99 for the Ottawa Capitals. In 1908 he went west on tour with the Ottawa team and then stayed afterwards in Vancouver. He played professional lacrosse with the Vancouver Lacrosse Club between 1909 and 1915. He went overseas after the 1913 season but returned in 1915 for one final season with Vancouver. In six seasons (1909–1913; 1915) with Vancouver, he played in 56 games and scored a total of 38 goals. He was primarily a 'home' (midfield) player but halfway through his final season he moved up to the 'outside home' position on the attack.

Allen was inducted into the Canadian Lacrosse Hall of Fame as a field player in 1966.

== Personal life ==
Allen had a wife and four daughters. He died in Vancouver, British Columbia in 1941 after a short illness, aged 59, and was buried at Ocean View Cemetery in Burnaby, British Columbia.

Angus 'Bones' Allen
SEASON	TEAM	LEAGUE	GAMES	GOALS	PEN	PIM
1909	Vancouver Lacrosse Club	BCLA	10	9	1	5
1910	Vancouver Lacrosse Club	BCLA	11	10	3	15
1911	Vancouver Lacrosse Club	BCLA	14	4	11	60
1912	Vancouver Lacrosse Club	BCLA	6	5	0	0
1913	Vancouver Lacrosse Club	BCLA	7	4	2	10
1915	Vancouver Lacrosse Club	BCLA	8	6	4	20
