= Dave Finnie =

Canadian ice hockey player (1883–1969)

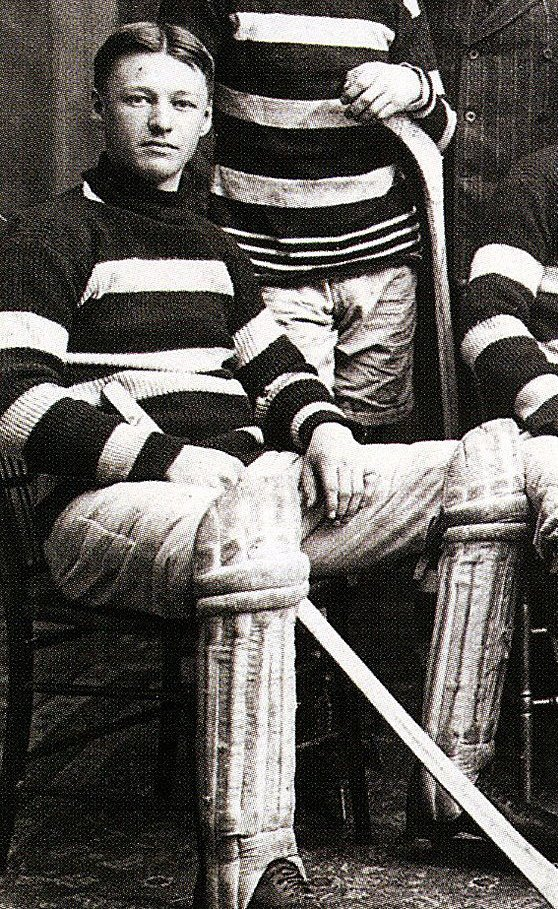
- Finnie, in Ottawa Silver Seven team photograph, 1905
- Born: August 2, 1883 Ottawa, Ontario, Canada
- Died: October 29, 1969 (aged 86) Waterloo, New York, United States
- Position: Goaltender
- Played for: Ottawa Aberdeens; Ottawa Hockey Club; Montreal Hockey Club
- Playing career: 1899–1908

David Nicholson Finnie (August 2, 1883 – October 29, 1969) was a Canadian ice hockey goaltender who played for the Ottawa Hockey Club. He was part of the renowned "Silver Seven" era of the team, which were Stanley Cup champions from 1903 to 1906. Finnie contributed to the team's Stanley Cup victory in 1905.

== Career ==
Finnie grew up in Ottawa, and played for the Ottawa Aberdeens. In 1904–05, after the retirement of Bouse Hutton, he became the starting goalie for Ottawa. The team was the reigning Stanley Cup champion, by winning the Federal Amateur Hockey League (FAHL) season and a Stanley Cup challenge match against the Dawson City Nuggets. He was the Ottawa goaltender only for the one season. Billy Hague won the job the next season. He played for the Montreal Hockey Club in 1907–08.

Finnie died on October 29, 1969, in Waterloo, New York.
