= Alf Smith (ice hockey) =

Canadian ice hockey player and coach (1873–1953)

- Hockey Hall of Fame, 1962
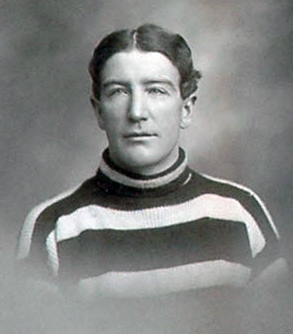
- Alf Smith as a member of the 1905 Ottawa Silver Seven
- Born: June 3, 1873 Ottawa, Ontario, Canada
- Died: August 21, 1953 (aged 80) Ottawa, Ontario, Canada
- Height: 5 ft 7 in (170 cm)
- Weight: 165 lb (75 kg; 11 st 11 lb)
- Position: Right wing
- Shot: Right
- Played for: Ottawa Hockey Club
- Playing career: 1894–1909

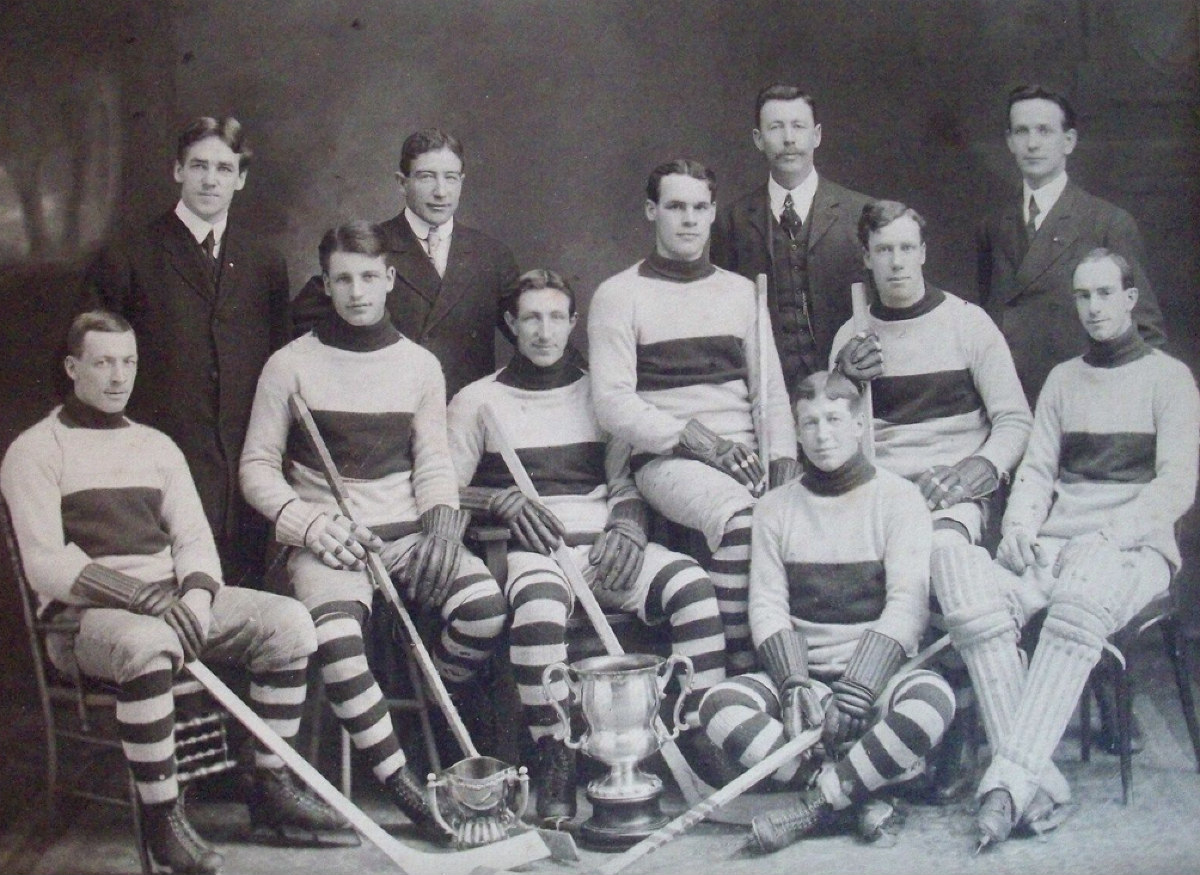
Alf Smith, second from left in the back row, with the Ottawa New Edinburghs in 1908.

Alfred Edward Smith (June 3, 1873 – August 21, 1953) was a Canadian amateur and professional ice hockey forward who played for the Ottawa Senators (a.k.a. Silver Seven) and Kenora Thistles. He had six younger brothers who played senior-level hockey in Ottawa: Daniel (b. 1876), Jack (b. 1878), Harry (b. 1883), Tommy (b. 1886), Billy (b. 1889) and George Smith (b. 1891). He was captain of the Ottawa Hockey Club and also coached the team.

He also played rugby football with the Ottawa Rough Riders, and, in 1902, won a championship with teammate in hockey as well Bouse Hutton.

== Hockey career ==
Alf Smith began his hockey career playing for the Ottawa Hockey Club (Ottawa HC) of the AHAC in the 1890s. In 1897 he retired from the Ottawa HC. In 1898, he played for the Ottawa Capitals intermediate team, but did not finish the season because he was ruled to be ineligible. In 1896, Smith had accepted a $100 bonus for play with the Capitals lacrosse team. By 1898, the Amateur Athletic Association of Canada ruled that he was ineligible for play in amateur hockey. He would not play for several years, but did coach the Ottawa Hockey Club to the 1901 CAHL title.

In 1901–02, he returned to active play, as a professional, in the Western Pennsylvania Hockey League for the Pittsburgh Athletic Club. The following year he returned to Canada to coach the Ottawa HC to their first Stanley Cup championship against the Montreal Victorias in 1903. In 1903–04 he became reinstated as an amateur and he returned to play, playing right wing on a line that featured "One Eyed" Frank McGee. As a player-coach, he would eventually lead the team to consecutive Stanley Cup victories in 1904, 1905, and 1906, the club by then known as the Silver Seven.

Smith was known as a rough player. In 1907 Smith and teammates Harry Smith and Charles Spittal were charged with assault after beating Montreal Wanderers players Hod Stuart, Ernie "Moose" Johnson and Cecil Blachford with their sticks. Harry Smith was acquitted while Spittal and Alf Smith were each fined $20.

For the 1906–07 season, McGee retired and his place on the top line was taken by Alf's brother Harry. At the conclusion of the 1907 ECAHA season, Smith moved west to play with the Stanley Cup champion Kenora Thistles, playing in the MPHL finals. He was also a player during their unsuccessful Stanley Cup challenge rematch versus the Montreal Wanderers, where his presence along with Harry Westwick caused the series to be played under protest. He played one final season with Ottawa in 1908, scoring 12 goals in 9 games.

In 1908–09, he had an eventful season. Lured back to Pittsburgh for the newly reformed Western Pennsylvania Hockey League, he was suspended from two teams for rough play. He returned to Ottawa and played with several former Silver Seven players on the Senators of the Federal League. He made time that season to coach the Ottawa Cliffsides to the first Allan Cup championship, only to lose it to Queen's University in a challenge. This was his final season of play.

In 1909–10, he resumed his coaching career with Renfrew, the so-called "Millionaires" of the new National Hockey Association (NHA). He returned to coach the Ottawa Hockey Club in 1913 and coached the team until 1917. Smith later coached and managed teams in Moncton, New Brunswick, and North Bay, Ontario.

Along with Harvey Pulford, Harry Westwick and Russell Bowie, Smith was one of the final active players who had played major senior hockey in the 19th century. He was inducted into the Hockey Hall of Fame in 1962.

He died in Ottawa on August 21, 1953.

=== Career stats ===
			Regular season					Playoffs
Season	Team	League	GP	G	A	Pts	PIM	GP	G	A	Pts	PIM
1894–95	Ottawa HC	AHAC	8	5	0	5	–	–	–	–	–	–
1895–96	Ottawa HC	AHAC	8	7	0	7	–	–	–	–	–	–
1896–97	Ottawa HC	AHAC	8	12	0	12	–	–	–	–	–	–
1901–02	Pittsburgh Athletic Club	WPHL	14	11	9	20	17	–	–	–	–	–
1903	Ottawa HC	CAHL	–	–	–	–	–	–	–	–	–	–
1904	Ottawa HC	CAHL	4	8	0	8	6	–	–	–	–	–
		Stanley Cup	–	–	–	–	–	7	13	0	13	20
1904–05	Ottawa HC	FAHL	8	13	0	13	30	–	–	–	–	–
		Stanley Cup	–	–	–	–	–	5	11	0	11	9
1906	Ottawa HC	ECAHA	10	13	0	13	36	2	1	0	1	0
		Stanley Cup	–	–	–	–	–	4	7	0	7	6
1907	Ottawa HC	ECAHA	9	17	0	17	19	–	–	–	–	–
	Kenora Thistles	MHL-Pro	1	2	0	2	–	2	1	0	1	3
	Kenora Thistles	Stanley Cup	–	–	–	–	–	2	2	0	2	3
1907–08	Ottawa HC	ECAHA	9	12	0	12	20	–	–	–	–	–
1908–09	Duquesne Athletic Club	WPHL	2	3	0	3	–	–	–	–	–	–
	Pittsburgh Bankers	WPHL	3	2	0	2	–	–	–	–	–	–
1909	Ottawa Senators (FHL)	FHL	1	1	0	1	0	–	–	–	–	–
WPHL totals			19	16	9	25	17	–	–	–	–	–
ECAHA totals			28	42	0	42	75	2	1	0	1	0
Stanley Cup totals			–	—	–	–	–	18	33	0	33	38

Source: "Legends of Hockey -- The Legends -- Honoured Player -- Smith, Alf -- Statistics, Awards & Career". Hockey Hall of Fame.

=== Coaching record ===
==== NHL ====
Team	Year	Regular season						Postseason
Team	Year	G	W	L	T	Pts	Division rank	Result
Ottawa Senators	1918-19	18	12	6	0	24	1st in NHL	Lost NHL finals (1-4 vs. MTL)
NHL totals		18	12	6	0	24		1-4 (0.200)

Preceded by first	Head Coach of the Ottawa Senators (Original); 1901	Succeeded by Pete Green
Preceded by Pete Green	Head Coach of the Ottawa Senators (Original); 1903–1906	Succeeded by Pete Green
Preceded by Pete Green	Head Coach of the Ottawa Senators (Original); 1913–1916	Succeeded by Eddie Gerard
