= Robert Taylor Shillington =

Canadian politician, mine owner, druggist and ice hockey executive

Robert Shillington
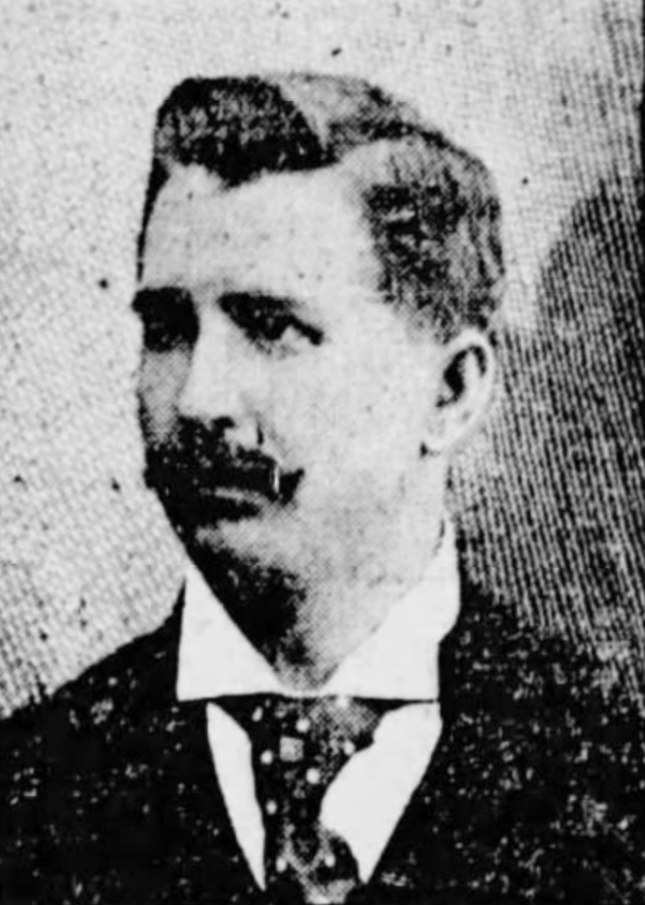
- Shillington c. 1901
- Born: Robert Taylor Shillington; October 3, 1867; Merivale, Ontario, Canada
- Died: January 11, 1934 (aged 66); Toronto, Ontario, Canada
- Occupations: politician, mine owner, druggist and ice hockey executive

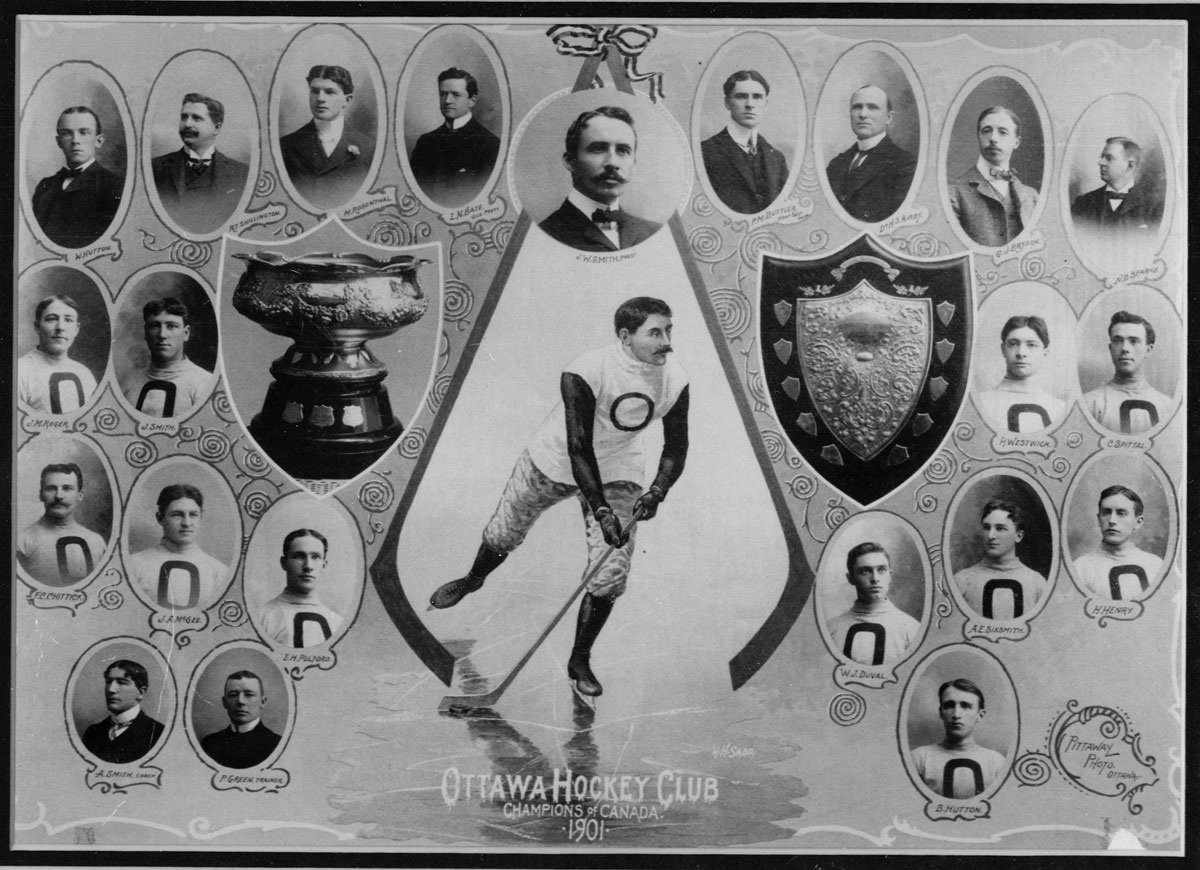
Shillington, second from left in the top row, with the 1901 Ottawa Hockey Club.

Robert Taylor Shillington (October 3, 1867 – January 11, 1934) was a Canadian politician, mine owner, druggist and ice hockey executive. Shillington was a member of the provincial legislature in the province of Ontario, representing the Timiskaming riding, first elected in 1908.

== Biography ==
Born in Merivale, a rural village now located within the city limits of Ottawa, in 1867, Shillington was one of ten children of Thomas and Elizabeth Shillington. Shillington attended the Ottawa Model School and Collegiate. He then attended the University of Toronto, graduating in pharmacy.

He returned to Ottawa and opened a druggist business on Sparks Street. His business was successful and he invested in mining in the Haileybury area. He also became an executive with the Ottawa Hockey Club. In 1903, after the Ottawas had won their first Stanley Cup Canadian championship, he gave each player a silver nugget. That donation led to the nickname Silver Seven. He would manage the club through its 1903–1906 championship run. In 1905, he sold his druggist business. In 1906, he moved to Haileybury full-time. He ran for a seat in the 1908 Ontario election and won in the district of Timiskaming.

In 1890, he married Harriet Cortie Score (1870–1939) and the couple had one child, Clarissa, in 1891. Shillington died in Toronto in 1934 and Harriet in 1939. He and his wife are interred in Mount Pleasant Cemetery in Toronto.

Shillington Avenue, an east–west road in Ottawa is named after the Shillington family which at one time owned the property.
