= Frank McGee (ice hockey) =

Canadian ice hockey player (1882–1916)

- Hockey Hall of Fame, 1945
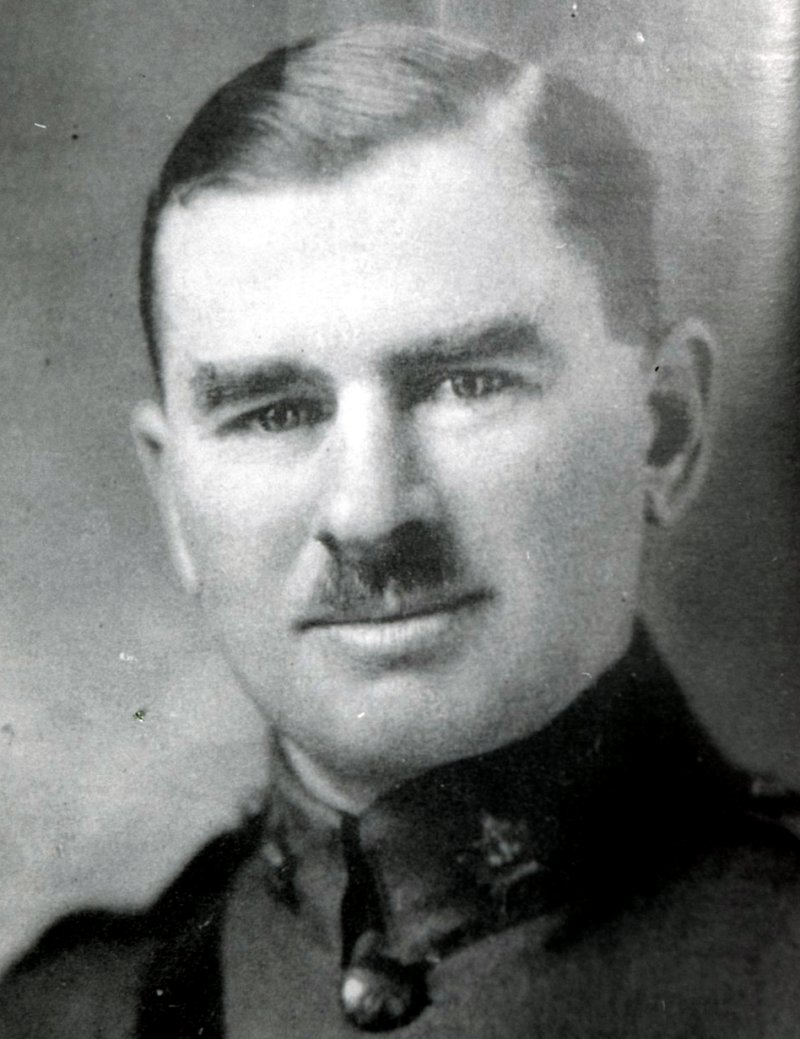
- McGee in 1914
- Born: November 4, 1882 Ottawa, Ontario, Canada
- Died: September 16, 1916 (aged 33) Courcelette, France
- Height: 5 ft 6 in (168 cm)
- Weight: 150 lb (68 kg; 10 st 10 lb)
- Position: Centre / Rover
- Shot: Left
- Played for: Ottawa Hockey Club
- Playing career: 1903–1906

Francis Clarence "One-Eyed Frank" McGee (November 4, 1882 – September 16, 1916) was a Canadian ice hockey player for the Ottawa Hockey Club (also known as the Silver Seven) between 1903 and 1906. He played as a centre and as a rover. (Note: The rover position was used in early ice hockey. The rover was a hybrid of a forward and defenceman, and would often take on offensive and defensive roles.) He was also a civil servant for the government of Canada and later became a lieutenant in the Canadian Army.

McGee was known as "One-Eyed Frank" because he was blind in one eye due to a hockey injury. After missing two years of play because of the injury, he joined the senior Ottawa team in 1903. A well-known player of his era for his prolific scoring, McGee once scored 14 goals in a Stanley Cup game and scored five goals or more in a game on eight other occasions. Despite a brief senior career—only 45 games over four seasons—he helped Ottawa win and retain the Stanley Cup title from 1903 to 1906.

After his hockey career ended, McGee worked for the Department of Indian Affairs in the Canadian federal government. During the First World War, he enlisted in the Canadian Expeditionary Force and died in battle in France in 1916. When the Hockey Hall of Fame was founded in 1945, McGee was in the first class of inductees.

== Personal life ==
McGee was born on November 4, 1882, in Ottawa, Ontario. He was one of nine children born to John Joseph McGee and Elizabeth Helen (née Crotty) McGee. He came from a prominent Canadian family. His father was clerk of the Privy Council, Canada's most senior civil servant. His uncle, Thomas D'Arcy McGee, attended two of the conferences that led to Canadian Confederation and was regarded as one of the Fathers of Confederation; he was assassinated in 1868. McGee's brother Jim was a noted athlete in rugby football and ice hockey, playing the latter with McGee in the 1903–04 season before dying in a horse-riding accident in May 1904. His brother Charles served in the Boer War and, like McGee, died in the First World War. His brother Walter also served in the First World War and was awarded the Military Cross.

After finishing his schooling in Ottawa, McGee joined the Canadian government's Department of Indian Affairs. He later assumed a role in the Department of the Interior. In 1904, his promotion within the department led him to briefly retire from ice hockey. Historian Paul Kitchen has suggested that McGee's rise in the civil service was aided in part by the connections of his father as a clerk of the Privy Council, and of William Foran, a hockey executive who also worked at the Board of Civil Service Examiners, the body that reviewed government promotions. McGee had a passion for sports; he participated in ice hockey, rugby football, lacrosse, and rowing. He played half-back for the Ottawa City rugby football team, winning the Canadian championship in 1898. He later played quarterback for the team before giving up football in 1900.

== Hockey career ==
McGee first earned recognition for his hockey ability during the 1899–1900 season. During this time he played for two teams: the Ottawa Aberdeens, who won the Quebec intermediate championship; and the Ottawa Canadian Pacific Railway (CPR) team, who won the Canadian Railway Hockey Union championship. On March 21, 1900, McGee was struck in his left eye by a "lifted puck" during an amateur game for a local CPR team. (Note: At the time, before icing rules came into effect, it was a common play for the defence to shoot the puck up into the air (lifting it with the blade of the stick, and referred to as a "lift") into the other team's end of the rink and opposing players would then skate to the other end to recover it.) As a result, he lost vision in his left eye and did not play in the following two seasons, instead working as a referee.

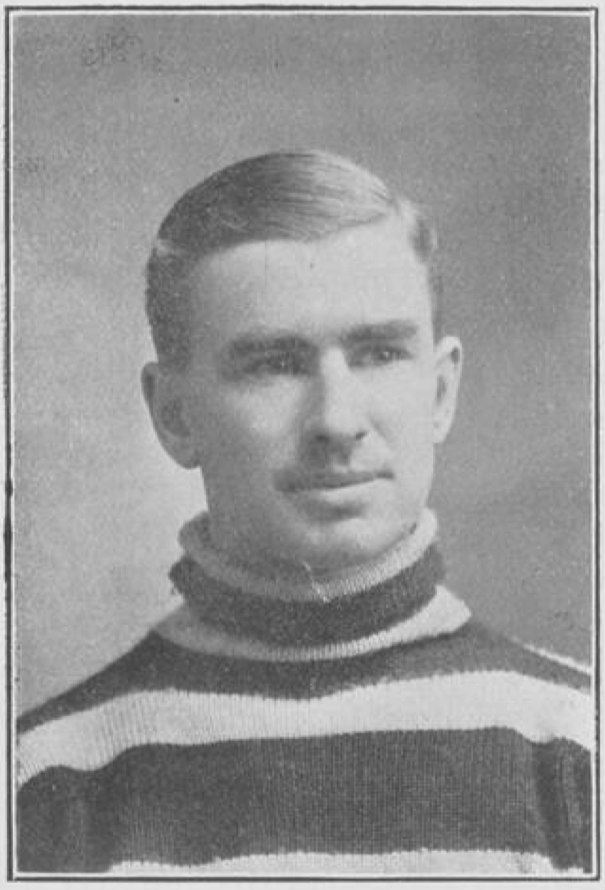
McGee with the Ottawa Hockey Club

In 1903, McGee decided to return to the sport, despite risking injury to his one good eye. Highly sought after, he joined the Ottawa Hockey Club (also known as the Silver Seven) of the senior (Note: Senior hockey refers to the top level of amateur hockey in Canada. All early hockey players were amateur, professionalism only becoming allowed by the top leagues in 1907.) Canadian Amateur Hockey League (CAHL). He was the youngest member of the team and at a height of 5 ft 6 in (1.68 m), was small for hockey players of the era. He excelled on the ice and was known to be strong and muscular, which was considered to be an ideal body type for the sport. In his first game with Ottawa, he scored two goals. He finished the 1903 season with 14 goals in six games, second in the league behind Russell Bowie. As Ottawa finished first in the league they were awarded the Stanley Cup and played in challenge games that year. (Note: Before multi-round playoffs were introduced in 1914, competition for the Stanley Cup was done via a challenge series between two teams, typically spanning three games or fewer.) McGee played in all four challenge games and scored seven more goals, tying Jack Marshall for lead goal-scorer during the challenge games, and Ottawa retained the Cup.

Ottawa resigned from the CAHL after four games during the 1904 season due to a dispute over a delayed game; in those four games McGee recorded 12 goals, placing him first on the team in scoring and fifth overall in the league. During a Stanley Cup challenge against the Toronto Marlboros on February 25, 1904, he scored five goals in one game, setting a new record for most goals in a Cup game. He again scored five goals in a game on March 9 against the Brandon Hockey Club. Ottawa played in several Cup challenge series over the season, winning them all. That season, McGee had 21 goals in eight challenge games. In the off-season, McGee's brother Jim died in a horse-riding accident. Aware of the dangers of playing hockey, McGee's family wanted him to stop in light of Jim's death, but he decided to keep playing.

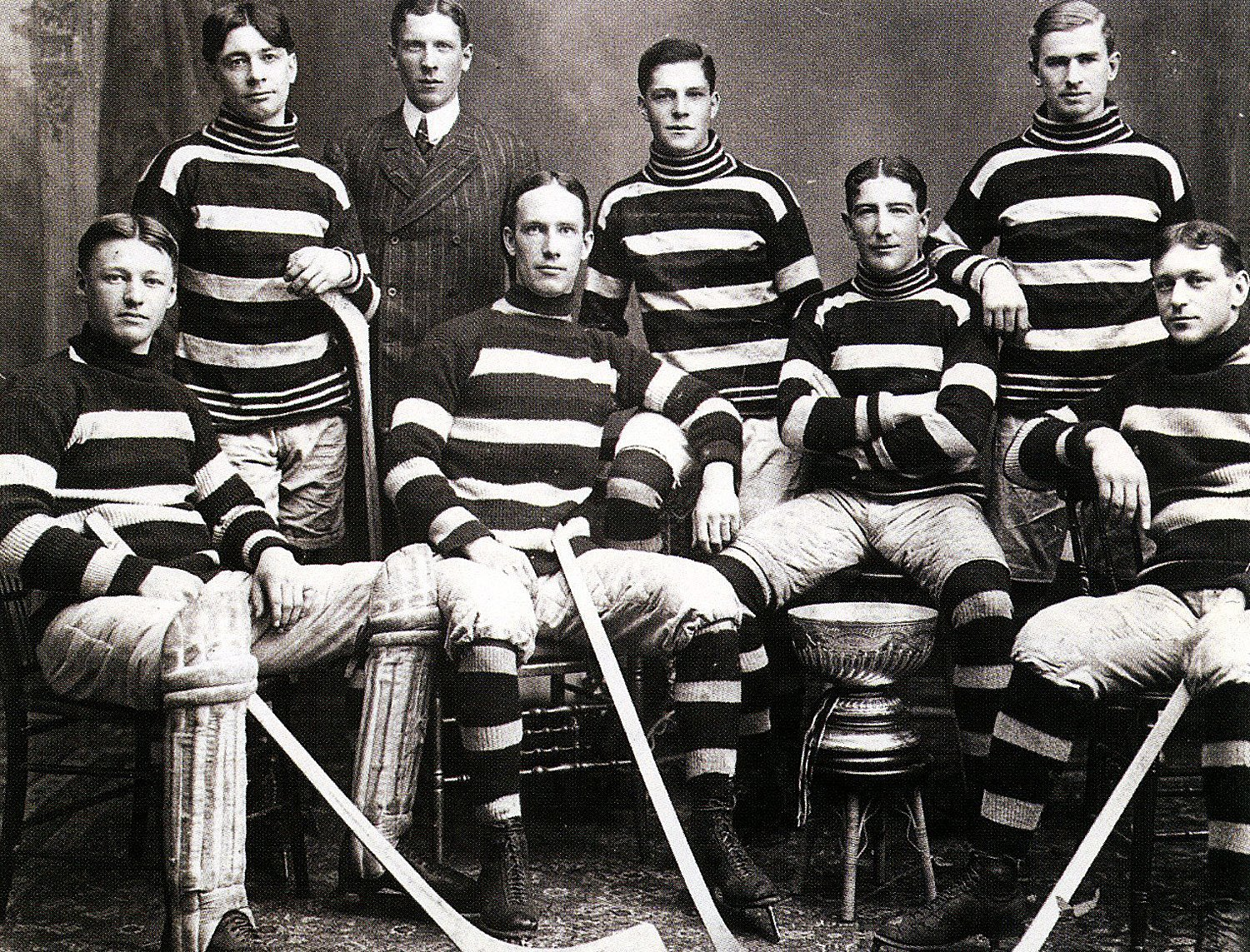
McGee (standing, far right) as a member of the 1905 Ottawa Silver Seven

Despite offers to reconcile by the CAHL, Ottawa joined the Federal Amateur Hockey League (FAHL) for the 1904–05 season. After a brief retirement from the sport owing to his work in the government, McGee returned, playing in six of the eight FAHL games and tying Marshall for best goalscorer in the league, with 17 goals. During the season, Ottawa also played in five Cup challenge games against the Dawson City Nuggets and the Rat Portage Thistles. The Nuggets, who had travelled 6,500 kilometres (4,000 mi) across Canada from the Yukon, were not considered a strong challenge for Ottawa. The Nuggets lost the first of the two-game series 9–2, and McGee only scored one goal in that game. After the game, the Nuggets' manager reportedly dismissed McGee's talents, saying that he "doesn't seem to be any great scorer". In the next game, on January 16, 1905, McGee scored a record 14 goals in Ottawa's 23–2 win. This included eight consecutive goals scored in less than nine minutes. The fourteen goals he scored remain the most ever scored by a single player in a Stanley Cup game. The game was also the most lopsided in Stanley Cup history as Ottawa's 23 goals also set a record. Later, it was disclosed that McGee was playing with a fractured wrist, and he missed the first game of the series against the Thistles.

To resolve the disputes among top-level hockey teams in Canada, a new unified league was created in December 1905, the Eastern Canada Amateur Hockey Association (ECAHA), which Ottawa joined. McGee initially retired from hockey before the start of the 1906 season, but returned to the team midway through the campaign. Appearing in seven of the ten league games, McGee finished third in the ECAHA in scoring, with 28 goals. Ottawa finished tied for first in the league with the Montreal Wanderers, setting up a two-game, total-goal series for the championship and the Stanley Cup. Montreal won 12–10, ending the Silver Seven's three-year reign. Including two other Cup challenge series played during the season, McGee had 17 goals in six challenge games.

After Ottawa lost the Stanley Cup to the Wanderers, McGee retired from hockey at 23 years old. Kitchen suggests that McGee's retirement was due to both family pressure and an upcoming promotion he was to receive at the Department of the Interior, which would require his full attention.

=== Legacy ===
McGee was slightly shorter than the average Canadian man, but he was noted for being strong relative to his size and having a physical, at times rough, style of play. Frank Patrick, a contemporary of McGee, described him as: "Even better than they say he was. He had everything – speed, stickhandling, scoring ability and was a punishing checker. He was strongly built but beautifully proportioned and he had an almost animal rhythm."

McGee is best known for being a prolific goal-scorer. During his career, he scored 135 goals in 45 games (including both league and challenge). Only one other player, Russell Bowie, rivals his average of three goals per game. With 14 goals against Dawson City, McGee holds the record for the most goals ever scored in a single Cup challenge game. McGee scored five or more goals in eight other senior games, and his highest single-game total in regular-season play was eight on March 3, 1906, against the Montreal Hockey Club.

McGee was one of the original nine players inducted into the Hockey Hall of Fame at its founding in 1945. In 1966, he was inducted into the Ottawa Sports Hall of Fame.

== First World War ==
Before the First World War, McGee and his brother Charles were members of the Non-Permanent Active Militia of Canada. When Canada entered the war in August 1914, both were mobilized for active duty. It is not definitively known how he was allowed to join the army given his limited vision. The medical officer who examined him wrote that McGee could "see the required distance with either eye". According to biographer William Houston, McGee's nephew said that McGee tricked the doctor. Houston wrote, "When he was asked to cover one eye and read the chart, he covered his blind eye, and when required to cover the other eye, he switched hands instead of eyes."

McGee was initially assigned to the 43rd Regiment, Duke of Cornwall's Own Rifles, though on November 11, 1914, he was transferred to the 21st Infantry Battalion and appointed a Temporary Lieutenant. The Battalion left for England in May 1915, and after spending the summer there, it was transferred to the Western Front in France on September 14, 1915. On December 17, 1915, he incurred a knee injury near Dickebusch when the armoured car he was driving was blown into a ditch by a shell explosion. He was sent back to England on December 28 and spent several months recuperating. On July 7, 1916, he was medically cleared for active duty and he returned to service on August 29. He was given the option to transfer to a clerical post in Le Havre, but chose to return to his battalion, rejoining them on September 5. With his battalion, he took part in the Battle of the Somme.

McGee was killed in action on September 16, 1916, near Courcelette, France. An artillery shell landed on or beside him and he was killed instantly; his body was never recovered. He was later mentioned in dispatches for actions he performed in the late morning on the day of his death. His brother Charles had died in action in May 1915 at the Battle of Festubert. Both of their names are inscribed on the Canadian National Vimy Memorial, along with all other Canadian soldiers killed in France with no known grave.

== Career statistics ==
=== Regular season and playoffs ===
			Regular season					Playoffs
Season	Team	League	GP	G	A	Pts	PIM	GP	G	A	Pts	PIM
1899–1900	Ottawa Seconds	CAHL-I	—	—	—	—	—	—	—	—	—	—
1900–01	Ottawa Aberdeens	OCJHL	—	—	—	—	—	—	—	—	—	—
1901–02	Ottawa Aberdeens	CAHL-I	—	—	—	—	—	—	—	—	—	—
1902–03	Ottawa HC	CAHL	6	14	—	14	9	2	3	—	3	—
1902–03	Ottawa HC	St-Cup	—	—	—	—	—	2	4	—	4	—
1903–04	Ottawa HC	CAHL	4	12	—	12	9	—	—	—	—	—
1903–04	Ottawa HC	St-Cup	—	—	—	—	—	8	21	—	21	—
1904–05	Ottawa HC	FAHL	6	17	—	17	14	—	—	—	—	—
1904–05	Ottawa HC	St-Cup	—	—	—	—	—	4	18	—	18	—
1905–06	Ottawa HC	ECAHA	7	28	—	28	18	—	—	—	—	—
1905–06	Ottawa HC	St-Cup	—	—	—	—	—	6	17	—	17	—
Senior totals			23	71	—	71	50	2	3	—	3	—
St-Cup totals			—	—	—	—	—	20	60	—	60	—

- Source: Total Hockey (Note: Assist totals for pre-PCHA years are unofficial. See Diamond 2002, p. 610.)

== Sources ==
- Cameron, Steve, ed. (2018), Hockey Hall of Fame Book of Players (Third ed.), Buffalo, New York: Firefly Books, ISBN 978-0-228-10137-6
- Clarke, Nic (March 2011), "'The Greater and Grimmer Game': Sport as an Arbiter of Military Fitness in the British Empire – The Case of 'One-Eyed' Frank Mcgee", The International Journal of the History of Sport, 28 (3–4): 604–622, doi:10.1080/09523367.2011.547320, S2CID 154909098
- Coleman, Charles L. (1964), The Trail of the Stanley Cup, Volume 1: 1893–1926 inc., Dubuque, Iowa: Kendall/Hunt Publishing, OCLC 957132
- Diamond, Dan, ed. (2002), Total Hockey: The Official Encyclopedia of the National Hockey League (Second ed.), New York: Total Sports Publishing, ISBN 1-892129-85-X
- Falconer, Tim (2021), Klondikers: Dawson City's Stanley Cup Challenge and How a Nation Fell in Love with Hockey, Toronto: ECW Press, ISBN 978-1-77041-607-9
- Francis 'Frank' McGee, Ottawa Sports Hall of Fame, Ottawa Sports Hall of Fame
- Frank McGee Biography, Hockey Hall of Fame
- "Free Kicks", The Globe, Toronto, Ontario, September 12, 1900
- Harper, Stephen J. (2013), A Great Game: The Forgotten Leafs & the Rise of Professional Hockey, Toronto: Simon & Schuster Canada, ISBN 978-1-4767-1653-4
- Houston, William (October 28, 1992), "Frank McGee had an eye for scoring", The Globe and Mail, p. C8
- Houston, William (1998), McGee, Francis Clarence, Dictionary of Canadian Biography
- Jenish, D'Arcy (1992), The Stanley Cup: A Hundred Years of Hockey at Its Best, Toronto, Ontario: McClelland & Stewart Inc., ISBN 0-7710-4406-2
- "John Jos. McGee Died Last Night At Age 81 Years", Ottawa Citizen, Ottawa, Ontario, April 11, 1927
- Kidd, Bruce (1997), The Struggle for Canadian Sport, Toronto: University of Toronto Press, ISBN 0-8020-7664-5
- Kitchen, Paul (2008), Win, Tie or Wrangle, Manotick, Ontario: Penumbra Press, ISBN 978-1-897323-46-5
- "Lieut. Frank McGee Heroic unto Death: Former Ottawa Hockey Idol Inspired His Men Killed at Coucellete", The Globe, Toronto, Ontario, November 11, 1916
- MacLeod, Alan Livingstone (2018), From Rinks to Regiments: Hockey Hall-of-Famers and the Great War, Victoria, British Columbia: Heritage House, ISBN 978-1-77203-268-0
- McKinley, Michael (2009), Hockey: A People's History, Toronto, Ontario: McClelland & Stewart Ltd, ISBN 978-0-7710-5769-4
- McKinley, Michael (2000), Putting a Roof on Winter: Hockey's Rise from Sport to Spectacle, Vancouver: Greystone Books, ISBN 1-55054-798-4
- "Ottawans in Casualties, Lt. Frank McGee's Death Was Officially Announced Saturday", Ottawa Citizen, Ottawa, Ontario, September 25, 1916
- Reddick, Don (2002a), "Dawson's Stanley Cup Challenge: From the Gold Rush to the Search for Silver", in Diamond, Dan (ed.), Total Hockey: The Official Encyclopedia of the National Hockey League (Second ed.), New York: Total Sports Publishing, pp. 37–39, ISBN 1-892129-85-X
- Reddick, Don (2002b), "The Death of Frank McGee", in Diamond, Dan (ed.), Total Hockey: The Official Encyclopedia of the National Hockey League (Second ed.), New York: Total Sports Publishing, pp. 48–50, ISBN 1-892129-85-X
- "Sad Death of Ottawa's Captain", The Globe, Toronto, Ontario, May 15, 1904
- Wong, John Chi-Kit (2005), Lords of the Rinks: The Emergence of the National Hockey League 1875–1936, Toronto: University of Toronto Press, ISBN 0-8020-8520-2
