= Arthur A. C. Moore =

Canadian ice hockey player

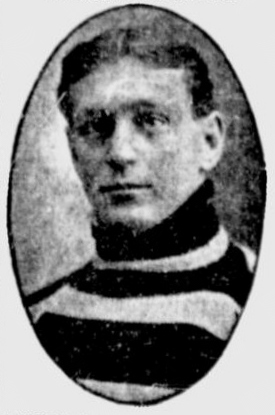
- Born: August 25, 1880 Acton, Ontario, Canada
- Died: January 7, 1935 (aged 54) Ottawa, Ontario, Canada
- Position: Defence
- Played for: Ottawa HC; Montreal HC
- Playing career: 1900–1909

Arthur Augustus Cutler Moore (August 25, 1880 – January 7, 1935) was an elite amateur ice hockey defenceman for the Ottawa Hockey Club during the era that it was known as the Silver Seven from 1903 to 1906. The club won the Stanley Cup in March 1903 and held it through numerous challenges until March 1906.

He also played rugby football with the Ottawa Rough Riders.

== Personal life ==
Moore married Flossie Bryson in 1912. The couple had three children, including daughter Jean, daughter Helen and son Arthur Jr.

== Playing career ==
=== Career statistics ===
	Regular season				Playoffs	
Season	Team	League	GP	G	GP	G
1901	Montreal HC	CAHL	2	0	-	-
1902	Ottawa HC	CAHL	1	0	-	-
1903&	Ottawa HC	CAHL	7	1	3	0
1904&	Ottawa HC	CAHL	4	0	5	1
1905&	Ottawa HC	FAHL	8	1	5	0
1906&	Ottawa HC	ECAHA	10	0	6	0
1907	Ottawa HC	ECAHA	1	0	-	-
1908	Ottawa HC	ECAHA	2	0	-	-

Moore missed most of the 1907 season due to a broken ankle. He was released after two games in the 1908 season.
