= Harvey Pulford =

Canadian ice hockey player (1875–1940)

- Hockey Hall of Fame, 1945
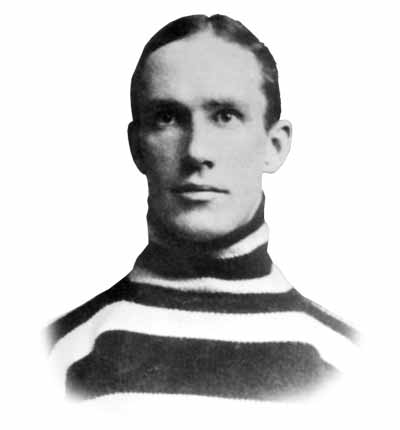
- Born: April 22, 1875 Toronto, Ontario, Canada
- Died: October 31, 1940 (aged 65) Ottawa, Ontario, Canada
- Height: 5 ft 11 in (180 cm)
- Weight: 201 lb (91 kg; 14 st 5 lb)
- Position: Defence
- Played for: Ottawa Hockey Club
- Playing career: 1892–1908

Ernest Harvey Pulford (April 22, 1875 – October 31, 1940) was a Canadian athlete at the turn of the twentieth century, winning national championships in ice hockey, lacrosse, football, boxing, paddling and rowing. A highly regarded defenceman with the Ottawa Hockey Club, where he was known for being a large and solid player who was excellent at checking opponents. With Ottawa he won the Stanley Cup four times, and also won championships or tournaments in every sport in which he played. When the Hockey Hall of Fame was founded in 1945, Pulford was one of the original nine inductees.

== Personal life ==
Harvey "Slugger" Pulford was born in Toronto, Ontario, on April 22, 1875. His parents, Ernest George and Minnie Pulford, were originally from England and had moved to Canada in 1874 with their infant son, Dennis. In 1878 the family moved to Ottawa, Ontario, as Ernest was hired by the Department of the Secretary of State. Pulford married Annis Mae Field of Brockville, Ontario; she died giving birth to a son, Harvey F. Pulford, on December 7, 1904. Pulford later married Jennie Davidson. In 1891 Pulford started working, first as a clerk with John M. Garland, a wholesale dry-goods firm, and later transferred into working as a salesman with the company. He later worked for the Imperial Life Assurance Company of Canada from 1921 until his death.

Pulford died October 31, 1940, and was buried in Ottawa's Beechwood Cemetery. Jennie, his widow lived until April 29, 1947, and is also buried at Beechwood. The younger Harvey Pulford became an employee of the Canadian Pacific Railway and eventually moved to Chicago.

== Sports career ==
=== Ice hockey ===
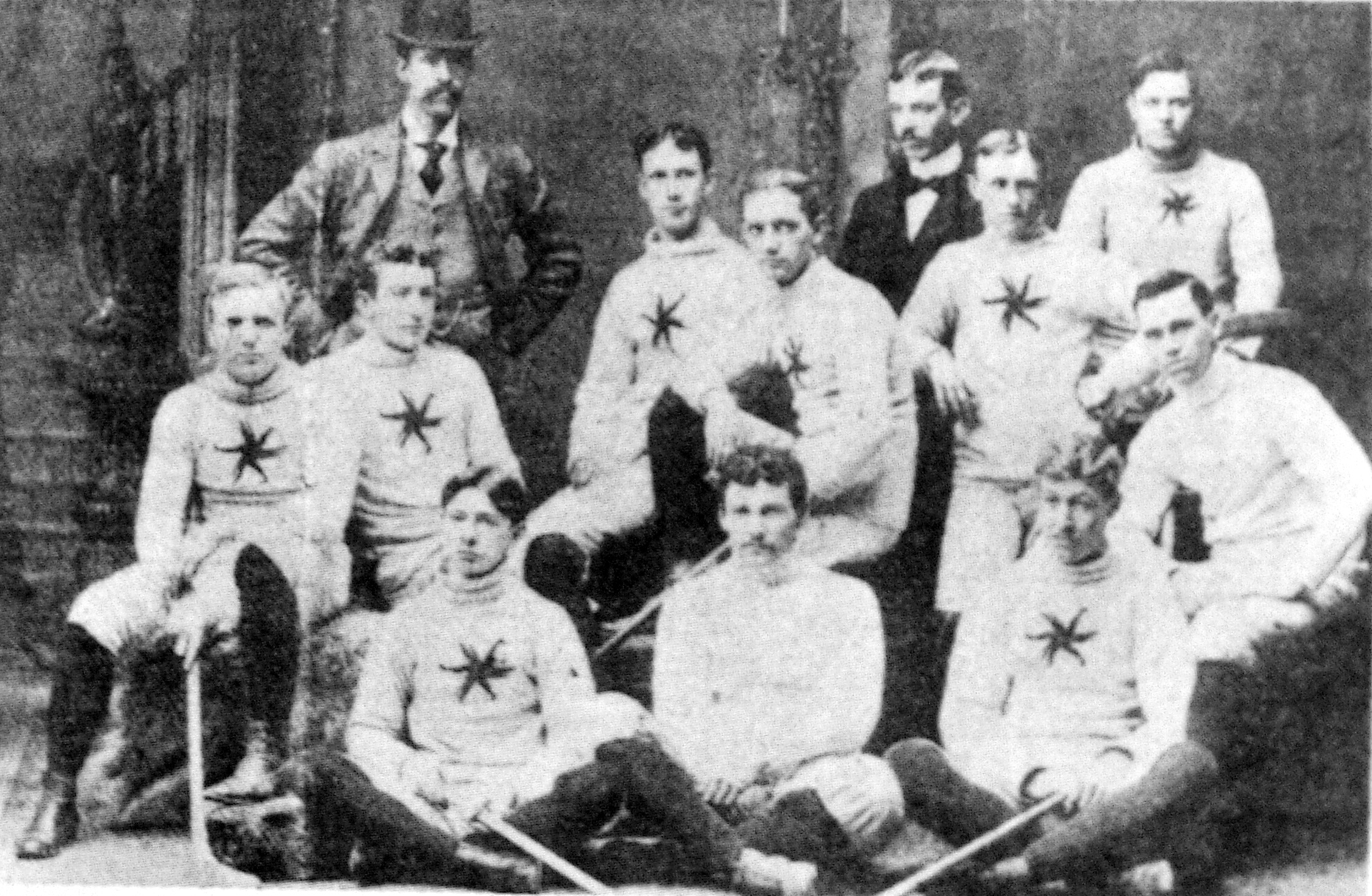
The Ottawa Hockey Club in 1895. Pulford is in the second row, third from left.

In his youth Pulford played for Ottawa Hockey Club's junior affiliate. In 1894 he joined the senior club, playing as a point; (Note: Point and cover-point were early versions of defencemen, and were not expected to contribute much to offensive actions.) he would remain with the team until 1908, the year that Ottawa became professional. Pulford would serve as captain of the Ottawa team several times during his career, first starting in 1897. While captain from 1902 to 1905 he led the team, later nicknamed the "Silver Seven", to retain the Stanley Cup, the championship trophy of hockey in Canada, defending it from nine challenges and remaining as champions from 1903 to 1905.

Pulford played his first senior-level games with the Ottawa club during the 1894 season, when the team was playing in the Amateur Hockey Association of Canada, then the top league in the country. His first game was on January 20, 1894, against the Montreal Victorias. He played six of the eight games that year. Pulford also appeared in his first Stanley Cup challenge games, against the Montreal Hockey Club; Montreal won the series and retained the Cup. Ottawa would not win their league championship again for several seasons, and thus was not able to challenge for the Cup again.

Ottawa moved to a new league in 1898, the Canadian Amateur Hockey League (CAHL). The team began to improve after this, and finished first in the CAHL for the 1901 season, though they did not submit a challenge for the Cup in time to play for it that year. This season also marked the start of Pulford changing his playing style, and started to rush towards the opponents end with the puck, rather than staying in his area, as was common at the time. Ottawa finished tied with the Victorias for the 1903 CAHL championship and right to hold the Cup, and the teams played a two-game, total-goal series to determine the winner; Ottawa won the series 9–2, with Pulford being credited for his ability to physically stop any opponents from entering his area of the ice. They defended the Cup in a series against the Rat Portage Thistles, ending the season with it.

A dispute with the CAHL over replaying a match led Ottawa to leave the league during the 1904 season and join the newly-formed Federal Amateur Hockey League. They were allowed to retain the Cup, and won all four challenge series' they faced, against the Winnipeg Rowing Club, Toronto Marlboros, Montreal Wanderers, and Brandon Wheat City Hockey Club. Pulford played in seven of the eight scheduled games, (Note: The one game Pulford missed was on March 2, 1904, against the Wanderers, owing to an injury.) and scored one goal. The team won the FAHL championship for the 1904–05 season with a record of seven wins and one loss; Pulford in six games and recorded one goal. The team played two challenge series that year, against the Dawson City Nuggets and the Rat Portage Thistles; Ottawa won both series, with Pulford playing in all four games.

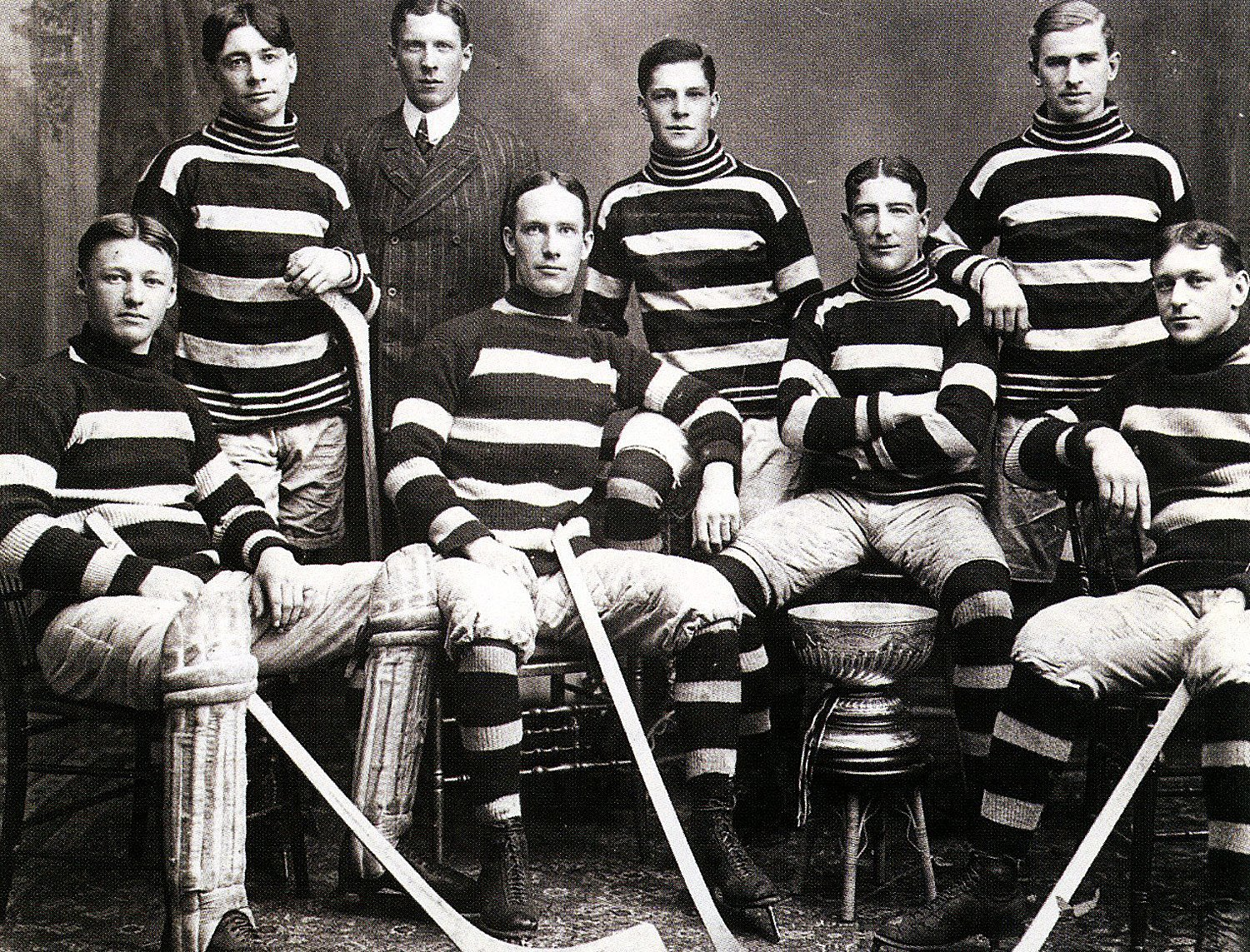
Ottawa with the Stanley Cup in 1905. Pulford is in the front row, second from the left.

Ottawa joined another new league in 1906, the Eastern Canada Amateur Hockey Association (ECAHA). They defeated Cup challenges from Queen's University and Smiths Falls Seniors. The team finished tied for first in the ECHA with the Wanderers in the season, with both teams winning nine of ten games; to determine a winner a two-game, total-goal series was played, which Ottawa lost, ending their hold of the Cup. Pulford played all ten regular season games, scoring a career-high three goals. He also scored one goal in the six Cup challenge games.

Pulford was hesitant to start the 1907 season as he wanted to row the following summer and was concerned about playing professionals on other hockey teams, which would not allow him to compete in other sports as the rules stated. Despite members of his rowing club telling him to stay out of hockey, Pulford wanted to play for the Cup and rejoined the Senators a few days before the season started. He recorded one goal in the nine games he played, as Ottawa finished second overall in the ECAHA. Prior to the 1909 season Pulford decided to retire from hockey. The league had become openly professional, while Pulford wanted to retain his amateur status.

A strong defender from the start, Pulford was a key part in Ottawa's rise as a team. As an example, Pulford broke his collarbone playing football in 1898, which caused him to miss most of the following hockey season. He returned for the final few games, but was not fully healed. His absence from the ice was greatly missed, and after sitting out a game in January 1899 that Ottawa lost (their first loss of the season), team executives called Pulford's absence "a pretty mean throw-down". While not a fast skater or skilled stickhandler, he was known as a big player and able to give solid checks. Hockey historian Charles Coleman noted that Pulford did not try to carry the puck up the ice until 1901, several years after the concept was introduced for defencemen, instead preferring to check opposing players and then shoot the puck to the other end of the ice. (Note: At the time, before icing rules came into effect, it was a common play for the defence to shoot the puck up into the air (lifting it with the blade of the stick, and referred to as a "lift") into the other team's end of the rink and opposing players would then skate to the other end to recover it.) He did not score many goals during his career, and did not score his first until he was in his seventh season, and only scored eight over his career. He was also known for his leadership of Ottawa, serving as captain for some time, and apparently was not happy to be replaced in that role in 1906.

=== Other sports ===
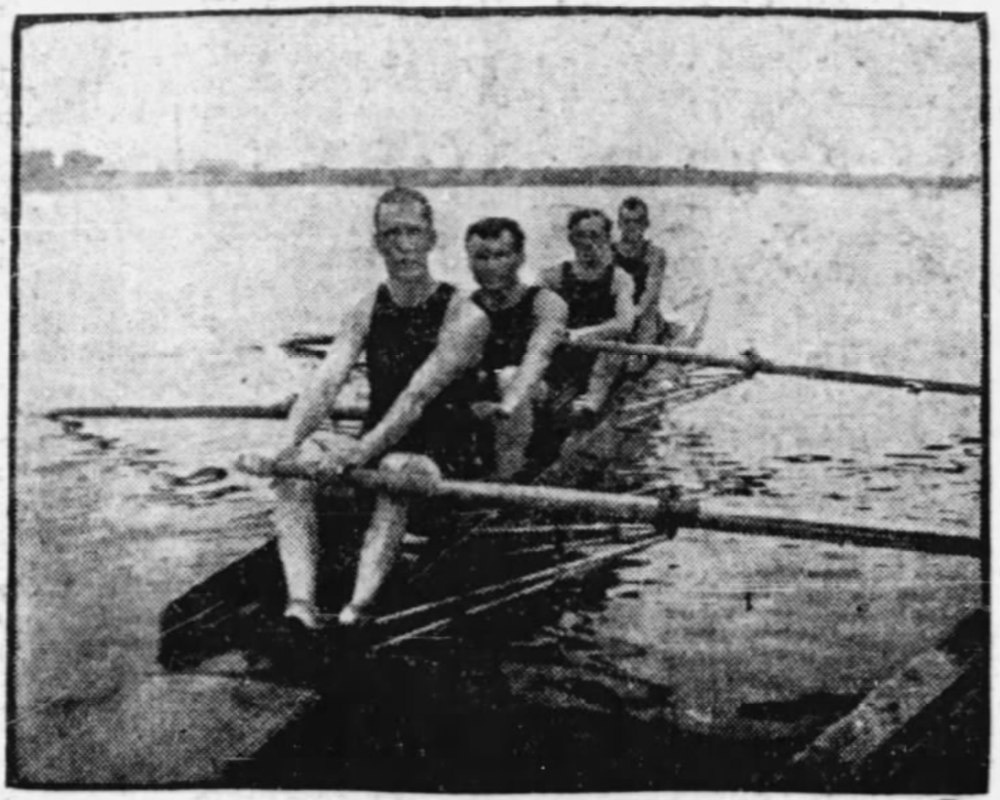
Pulford, at the front, with Ottawa Rowing Club teammates Eddie Phillips, Wilf Harrison and Ormie Haycock.

Pulford was outstanding in several sports. He was a backfielder for the Ottawa Football Club football team from 1893 to 1909, winning national championships in 1898, 1899, 1900, and 1902. He also served as captain of the team. He played lacrosse for the Ottawa Lacrosse Club from 1893 to 1900, winning four national titles. As a boxer, he won Eastern Canadian light heavyweight and heavyweight titles between 1896 and 1898.

However it was as a rower that Pulford gained international acclaim. He was a member of the Britannia Boating Club, winning national and U.S. championships. Due to his hockey career, which coincided with the rise of professionalism in that sport, he had to be re-instated by the Canadian Association of Amateur Oarsmen in 1909, as had played against professionals and was thus considered a professional by the rules of the time. (Note: A professional athlete was considered anyone who was paid to play a sport, or played against anyone else being paid to play a sport. This label would apply to all other sports the individual played.) He was a member of the Ottawa Rowing Club, and in 1910 their eight defeated every one of its opponents, earning the Canadian and North American championships. In 1911 his crew reached the semifinals of the Henley Royal Regatta. Pulford's crew lost to one from Magdalen College, Oxford University; Pulford reportedly said his participation in the regatta was his greatest sporting achievement. He time as a rower with the Club ended in 1915. Later on he served as president of the Club, and resigned in 1936.

=== Post-playing career ===
After retirement from playing hockey, Pulford served as a referee, working in that capacity from 1912 to 1919 in both the National Hockey Association (NHA) and National Hockey League. In 1916, Pulford was a candidate to succeed Emmett Quinn as president of the NHA, though he lost to Frank Robinson. He was nominated by Eddie Livingstone to replace Frank Calder as president of the by-then defunct NHA in a league meeting on September 28, 1918, but Calder would retain his position. In 1933, Pulford was given an option to buy the Ottawa club, by then known as the Senators, and move it to Baltimore, Maryland, but the purchase did not go through.

Pulford was a charter member of the Hockey Hall of Fame, in 1945, and the Ottawa Sports Hall of Fame, 1966. He was also inducted into the Ontario Sports Hall of Fame in 2003 and into Canada's Sports Hall of Fame in 2015.

== Career statistics ==
=== Regular season and playoffs ===
			Regular season					Playoffs
Season	Team	League	GP	G	A	Pts	PIM	GP	G	A	Pts	PIM
1893–94	Ottawa Hockey Club	AHAC	6	0	0	0	—	1	0	0	0	—
1894–95	Ottawa Hockey Club	AHAC	7	0	0	0	—	—	—	—	—	—
1895–96	Ottawa Hockey Club	AHAC	8	0	0	0	—	—	—	—	—	—
1896–97	Ottawa Hockey Club	AHAC	8	0	0	0	—	—	—	—	—	—
1897–98	Ottawa Hockey Club	AHAC	7	0	0	0	—	—	—	—	—	—
1898–99	Ottawa Hockey Club	CAHL	5	0	0	0	—	—	—	—	—	—
1899–1900	Ottawa Hockey Club	CAHL	6	1	0	1	—	—	—	—	—	—
1899–1900	Ottawa Aberdeens	CAHL-I	1	0	0	0	—	—	—	—	—	—
1900–01	Ottawa Hockey Club	CAHL	5	0	0	0	—	—	—	—	—	—
1902–03	Ottawa Hockey Club	CAHL	7	0	0	0	15	2	0	0	0	—
1902–03	Ottawa Hockey Club	St-Cup	—	—	—	—	—	2	0	0	0	9
1903–04	Ottawa Hockey Club	CAHL	2	0	0	0	3	—	—	—	—	—
1903–04	Ottawa Hockey Club	St-Cup	—	—	—	—	—	7	1	0	1	12
1904–05	Ottawa Hockey Club	FAHL	6	1	0	1	6	—	—	—	—	—
1904–05	Ottawa Hockey Club	St-Cup	—	—	—	—	—	4	0	0	0	6
1905–06	Ottawa Hockey Club	ECAHA	10	3	0	3	27	2	0	0	0	—
1905–06	Ottawa Hockey Club	St-Cup	—	—	—	—	—	4	1	0	1	36
1906–07	Ottawa Hockey Club	ECAHA	10	0	0	0	31	—	—	—	—	—
1907–08	Ottawa Hockey Club	ECAHA	9	1	0	1	32	—	—	—	—	—
AHAC totals			36	0	0	0	—	1	0	0	0	—
CAHL totals			25	1	0	1	18	2	0	0	0	—
FAHL totals			6	1	0	1	6	—	—	—	—	—
ECAHA totals			29	4	0	4	90	2	0	0	0	—
St-Cup totals			—	—	—	—	—	17	2	0	2	63

- Source: Total Hockey (Note: Assists were not officially counted.)

== Bibliography ==
- "A Few Remarks About That Game", The Gazette, Montreal, November 30, 1899
- Canada's Sports Hall of Fame (June 18, 2015), Canada's Sports Hall of Fame Celebrates the Induction of an Historic Canadian Sport Legends Class, Sport Information Resource Centre
- "Church Filled To Capacity For Harvey Pulford Funeral", Ottawa Citizen, November 1, 1940
- Coleman, Charles L. (1964), The Trail of the Stanley Cup, Volume 1: 1893–1926 inc., Dubuque, Iowa: Kendall/Hunt Publishing, OCLC 957132
- Cross, Austin (November 8, 1949), "Cross Town", Ottawa Citizen, Ottawa
- Diamond, Dan, ed. (2000), Total Hockey: The Official Encyclopedia of the National Hockey League (Second ed.), New York: Total Sports Publishing (published 2002), ISBN 1-892129-85-X
- Hardy, Stephen; Holman, Andrew C. (2018), Hockey: A Global History, Champaign, Illinois: University of Illinois Press, ISBN 978-0-252-08397-6
- Harper, Stephen J. (2013), A Great Game: The Forgotten Leafs & The Rise of Professional Hockey, Toronto: Simon & Schuster Canada, ISBN 978-1-4767-1653-4
- "Harvey Pulford", oshof.ca, Ontario Sports Hall of Fame, 2018, archived from the original on July 12, 2019
- "Harvey Pulford", Pittsburgh Press, Pittsburgh, December 31, 1906
- Harvey Pulford Biography, Hockey Hall of Fame
- "Hold E.R.A Regata At Brockville July 4", The Gazette, Montreal, March 20, 1936
- Holzman, Morey; Nieforth, Joseph (2002), Deceptions and Doublecross: How the NHL Conquered Hockey, Toronto: Dundurn Press, ISBN 1-55002-413-2
- Jenish, D'Arcy (1992), The Stanley Cup: A Hundred Years of Hockey at Its Best, Toronto, Ontario: McClelland & Stewart Inc., ISBN 0-7710-4406-2
- Kitchen, Paul (2019), Pulford, Ernest Harvey, Dictionary of Canadian Biography
- Kitchen, Paul (2008), Win, Tie, or Wrangle: The Inside Story of the Old Ottawa Senators, 1883–1935, Manotic, Ontario: Penumbra Press, ISBN 978-1-897323-46-5
- Koffman, Jack (April 28, 1953), "Ottawa Rowing Club Nearly Scored Grand Slam", Ottawa Citizen, Ottawa
- McFarlane, Brian (1969), 50 Years of Hockey, 1917–1967: An Intimate History of the National Hockey League, Winnipeg, Manitoba: Greywood Publishing Limited, OCLC 459759
- McKinley, Michael (2000), Putting a Roof on Winter: Hockey's Rise from Sport to Spectacle, Vancouver: Greystone Books, ISBN 1-55054-798-4
- Ottawa Citizen (April 30, 1947), "Mrs. Harvey Pulford dies in 75th year", Ottawa Citizen, Ottawa
- "Pulford Quits Rowing", Vancouver Sun, Vancouver, British Columbia, March 24, 1915
- "The Sporting World", Ottawa Citizen, Ottawa, January 30, 1899
- Wong, John Chi-Kit (2005), Lords of the Rinks: The Emergence of the National Hockey League, 1875–1936, Toronto: University of Toronto Press, ISBN 978-0-8020852-0-7
- Zweig, Eric (2022), Engraved in History: The Story of the Stanely Cup Champion Kenora Thistles, Kenora, Ontario: Rat Portage Press, ISBN 978-1-7778897-0-8
- Zweig, Eric (2012), Stanley Cup: 120 Years of Hockey Supremacy, Richmond Hill, Ontario: Firefly Books, ISBN 978-1-77085-104-7

Preceded by Fred Chittick	Ottawa Senators captain (Original Era); 1897–98	Succeeded by Chauncey Kirby
Preceded by Fred Chittick	Ottawa Senators captain (Original Era); 1900–01	Succeeded by William Duval
Preceded by William Duval	Ottawa Senators captain (Original Era); 1902–06	Succeeded by Bruce Stuart
