= 1908–09 Ottawa Hockey Club season =

Canadian ice hockey club season

1908–09 Ottawa Hockey Club
- Stanley Cup champions
- 1908–09 record: 10–2–0
- Home record: 6–0–0
- Road record: 4–2–0
- Goals for: 122
- Goals against: 69

Team information
- Coach: Pete Green
- Captain: Marty Walsh
- Arena: The Arena

Team leaders
- Goals: Marty Walsh (38)
- Wins: Percy LeSueur (13)
- Goals against average: Percy LeSueur (4.3)

The 1908–09 Ottawa Hockey Club season was the club's 24th season, third in the Eastern Canada Amateur Hockey Association. Ottawa won the league championship and took over the Stanley Cup from the Montreal Wanderers.

== Team business ==
This was the first season that the Club played as professionals as the amateur clubs dropped out of the league. There was turnover in Ottawa as Harvey Pulford and Alf Smith retired and Tom Phillips left. Ottawa would replace these players with Edgar Dey, Billy Gilmour and Albert 'Dubby' Kerr from Toronto Professionals. Alf Smith would organize the Ottawa Senators of the Federal Hockey League.

Ottawa played an exhibition game prior to the season with the Toronto Professionals on January 2 in Toronto. Ottawa lost to Toronto 5–4. Dubby Kerr played for Toronto, and signed with Ottawa a week later. Kerr had been the subject of a dispute between the Toronto and Berlin teams. The OPHL awarded Kerr to Guelph, but he instead left to join Ottawa.

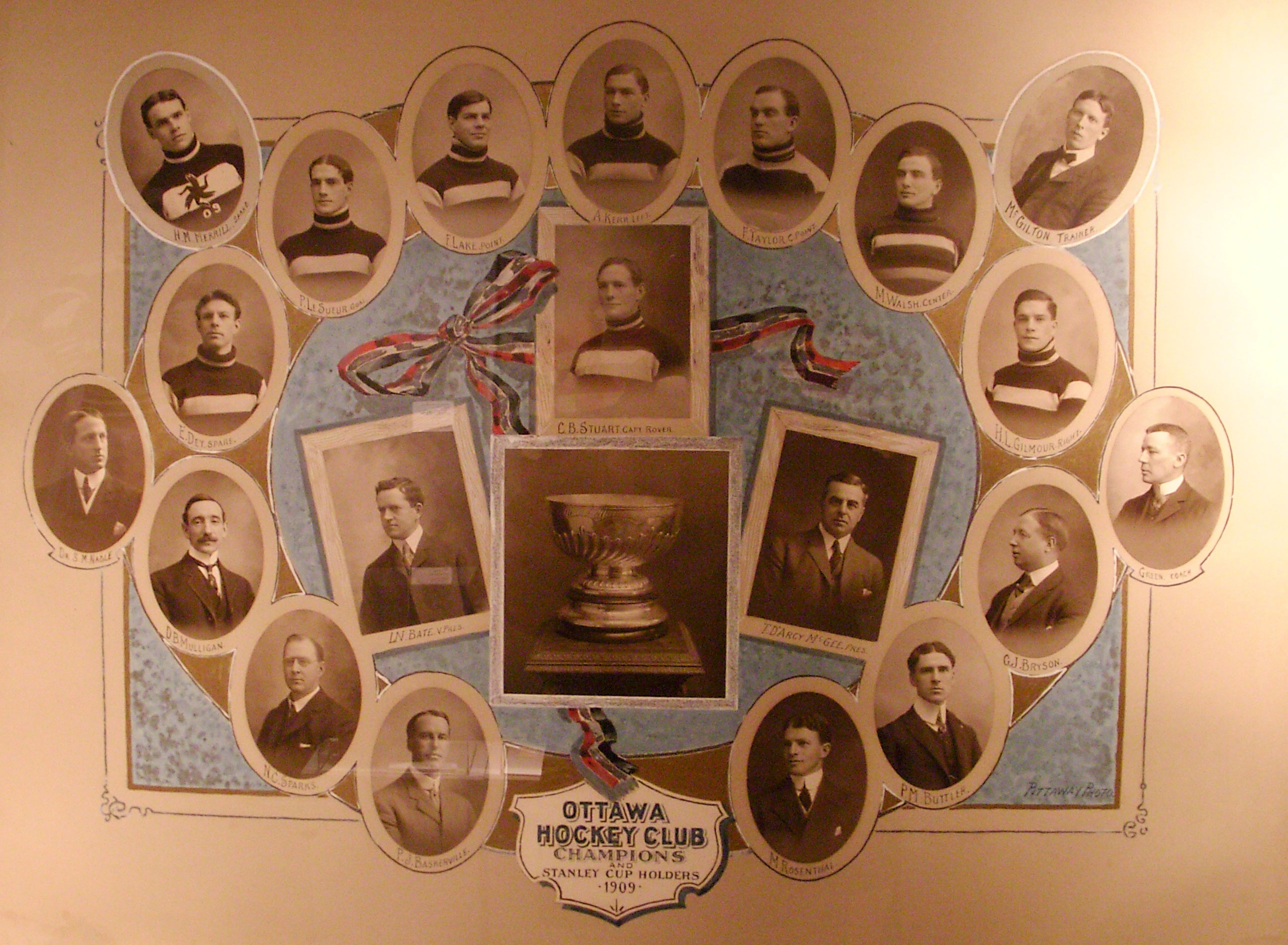
1909 Ottawa Hockey Club team picture

== Regular season ==
Marty Walsh would win the scoring championship with 38 goals. Ottawa would average nearly ten goals per game. After losing the first game, Ottawa then won the next ten in a row before losing in the final game of the season, when the league championship was already won.

=== Final standing ===
Team	Games Played	Wins	Losses	Ties	Goals For	Goals Against
Ottawa HC	12	10	2	0	117	63
Montreal Wanderers	12	9	3	0	82	61
Quebec HC	12	3	9	0	78	106
Montreal Shamrocks	12	2	10	0	56	103

== Schedule and results ==
Month	Day	Visitor	Score	Home	Score	Record
Jan.	6	Ottawa	6	Wanderers	7 (7:40 OT)	0–1
Jan.	9	Quebec	5	Ottawa	13	1–1
Jan.	13	Ottawa	11	Shamrocks	3	2–1
Jan.	16	Shamrocks	7	Ottawa	9	3–1
Jan.	23	Ottawa	18	Quebec	4	4–1
Jan.	30	Wanderers	4	Ottawa	5	5–1
Feb.	6	Ottawa	9	Wanderers	8	6–1
Feb.	13	Quebec	6	Ottawa	14	7–1
Feb.	20	Ottawa	7	Shamrocks	3	8–1
Feb.	27	Shamrocks	2	Ottawa	11	9–1
Mar.	4	Wanderers	3	Ottawa	8	10–1
Mar.	7	Ottawa	6	Quebec	11	10–2

=== Goaltending averages ===
Name	Club	GP	GA	SO	Avg.
LeSueur, Percy	Ottawa	12	63		5.3

=== Leading scorers ===
Name	Club	GP	G
Walsh, Marty	Ottawa	12	38
Stuart, Bruce	Ottawa	11	22
Kerr, Dubby	Ottawa	9	20
Gilmour, Billy	Ottawa	11	11

== Ottawa Hockey Club 1909 Stanley Cup Champions ==
=== Players ===
Centres

Wingers

- Albert "Dubbie" Kerr
- Hamilton Billy Gilmour (Also played rover)

Defencemen

- Fred Lake(point),
- Fred "Cyclone" Taylor (cover point),
- Edgar Dey Jr.(also played wing)

Goaltenders

- Percy LeSueur

=== Coaching and administrative staff ===
- Thomas D'arcy McGee (President), Llewellyn Bates (Vice President)
- Pete Green (Coach), Patrick Baskerville (Treasurer)
- Martin Rosenthal (Secretary), Mac McGilton (Trainer)
- Charles Sparks, George Bryson, David B. Mulligan(Directors)
- Perciville Buttler, S.N. Nagle (Directors)

Only players were included on the team picture, which is reproduced in Coleman, p. 177.

=== Stanley Cup engraving ===
Ottawa added a new ring to the bottom of the Stanley Cup and put their name on it.

== See also ==
- 1909 ECHA season
- 1908 in sports
- 1909 in sports
- List of Stanley Cup champions

Preceded by Montreal Wanderers; 1908	Ottawa HC; Stanley Cup Champions; 1909	Succeeded by Ottawa HC; January 1910
