= Howard McNamara =

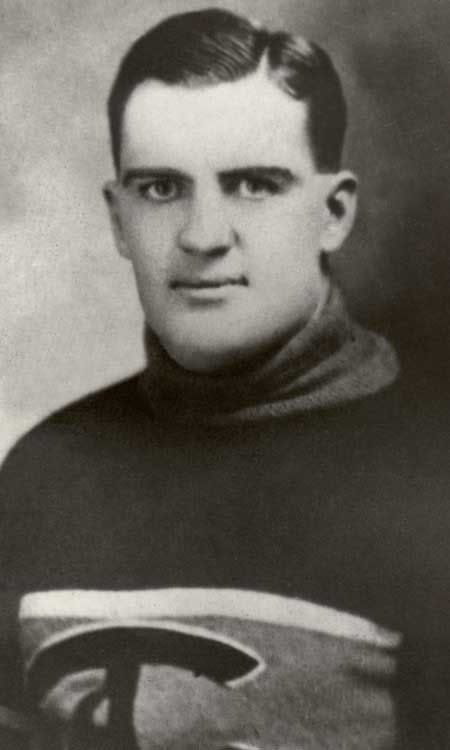
- Howard McNamara with the Montreal Canadiens
- Born: November 22, 1891 Randolph, Ontario, Canada
- Died: September 24, 1940 (aged 48) near Deseronto, Ontario, Canada
- Height: 6 ft 0 in (183 cm)
- Weight: 240 lb (109 kg; 17 st 2 lb)
- Position: Defence
- Shot: Left
- Played for: Toronto Ontarios; Montreal Canadiens
- Playing career: 1909–1920

Howard Dennis McNamara (November 22, 1891 – September 24, 1940) was a Canadian professional ice hockey defenceman. He played professionally from 1908 to 1920, including two seasons with the Montreal Canadiens, including the 1916 Stanley Cup champions. McNamara is the younger brother of Harold and George, who also played professionally.

== Playing career ==
Born in Randolph, Ontario, Howard moved to Sault Ste. Marie when he was 12 years old. Along with George, he joined the Halifax Crescents in the Maritime Professional Hockey League in 1911–12, thus forming the "Dynamite Twins". The pair were unusually large for players of that era and formed a formidable defensive pair. Howard moved on to become captain of the Montreal Canadiens of the National Hockey Association when they won their first Stanley Cup in 1916. McNamara played in an exhibition series in 1912–13 with the Toronto Tecumsehs.

== Personal life ==
Both Howard and his brother George served in World War I. George rose in the ranks from lieutenant to major. After returning from Europe, George and Howard founded the McNamara Construction Company and developed it into a prosperous firm.

Howard McNamara died of a heart seizure on his yacht "Brigadier" during a fishing trip near Deseronto, Ontario.

== Career statistics ==
=== Regular season and playoffs ===
			Regular season					Playoffs
Season	Team	League	GP	G	A	Pts	PIM	GP	G	A	Pts	PIM
1908–09	Montreal Shamrocks	ECHA	10	4	0	4	61	—	—	—	—	—
1908–09	Canadian Soo Pros	Exhib	2	4	0	4	6	—	—	—	—	—
1909–10	Berlin Dutchmen	OPHL	8	4	0	4	28	—	—	—	—	—
1909–10	Cobalt Silver Kings	NHA	6	0	0	0	15	—	—	—	—	—
1910–11	Waterloo Colts	OPHL	15	2	0	2	—	1	0	0	0	—
1911–12	Halifax Crescents	MaPHL	11	4	0	4	26	—	—	—	—	—
1912–13	Toronto Tecumsehs	NHA	20	12	0	12	62	—	—	—	—	—
1913–14	Toronto Ontarios	NHA	20	7	6	13	36	—	—	—	—	—
1914–15	Toronto Shamrocks	NHA	18	4	1	5	67	—	—	—	—	—
1915–16	Montreal Canadiens	NHA	24	10	7	17	119	—	—	—	—	—
1915–16	Montreal Canadiens	St-Cup	—	—	—	—	—	5	0	0	0	24
1916–17	Toronto 228th Battalion	NHA	12	11	3	14	36	—	—	—	—	—
1919–20	Montreal Canadiens	NHL	10	1	0	1	4	—	—	—	—	—
NHA totals			100	44	17	61	335	—	—	—	—	—
NHL totals			10	1	0	1	4	—	—	—	—	—

Preceded by Jimmy Gardner	Montreal Canadiens captain 1915–16	Succeeded by Newsy Lalonde
