= 1912–13 Ottawa Senators season =

Professional ice hockey team season of play

1912–13 Ottawa Senators
- League: 5th NHA
- 1912–13 record: 9–11–0
- Goals for: 87
- Goals against: 81

Team information
- General manager: Pete Green
- Coach: Pete Green
- Captain: Percy Lesueur
- Arena: The Arena

Team leaders
- Goals: Harry Broadbent (20)
- Goals against average: Clint Benedict (2.8)

The 1912–13 Ottawa Senators season was the 28th season of play of the Ottawa Hockey Club. Ottawa placed fifth and missed the playoffs.

== Team business ==
In this season, the Ottawa Hockey Club became more commonly known as the 'Ottawa Senators'. The organization remained known as the Ottawa Hockey Association.

The lease of the Arena was held up over a dispute of the percentages. The Club wanted to continue at 70% of gate revenues, while Ted Dey, owner of the Arena, was demanding that the Club accept 60%.

== Off-season ==
The league added two new teams in Toronto, the Torontos and the Tecumsehs. Former Ottawa player Bruce Ridpath became Toronto's first manager. The new teams recruited their own players and no players moved from other NHA teams to Toronto. However, the PCHA went after NHA players and Ottawa's Cyclone Taylor and Dubbie Kerr moved west to play in the PCHA. Taylor, who had been barred from joining the Senators by the Wanderers, became eligible to play for the Senators when the Wanderers dropped their interest in him, but he chose to move out west where he would remain for the rest of his life. Marty Walsh, who had become a part-time player in the 11–12 season, retired. Two new players joined the Senators lineup this season, Punch Broadbent and Clint Benedict, who would both play for Ottawa into the 1920s. Defenceman Horace Merrill, who had previously been a spare for the Senators, joined them full-time this season.

== Regular season ==
Broadbent led the team with 20 goals in 20 games in his first season. Benedict would post his first shutout in the NHA on February 12, 1913, against the Tecumsehs.

=== Final standings ===
National Hockey Association
	GP	W	L	T	GF	GA
Quebec Bulldogs	20	16	4	0	112	75
Montreal Wanderers	20	10	10	0	93	90
Toronto Hockey Club	20	9	11	0	86	95
Montreal Canadiens	20	9	11	0	83	81
Ottawa Senators	20	9	11	0	87	81
Toronto Tecumsehs	20	7	13	0	59	98

Note: W = Wins, L = Losses, T = Ties, GF= Goals For, GA = Goals Against

=== Results ===
Month	Day	Visitor	Score	Home	Score	Record
Dec.	28	Ottawa	3	Quebec	7	0–1
Jan.	1	Toronto	1	Ottawa	7	1–1
Jan.	4	Ottawa	7	Canadiens	3	2–1
Jan.	8	Ottawa	1	Tecumsehs	4	2–2
Jan.	11	Ottawa	5	Wanderers	11	2–3
Jan.	15	Wanderers	1	Ottawa	9	3–3
Jan.	18	Canadiens	6	Ottawa	0	3–4
Jan.	22	Tecumsehs	4	Ottawa	3 (7' overtime)	3–5
Jan.	25	Ottawa	9	Toronto	5	4–5
Jan.	29	Quebec	5	Ottawa	3	4–6
Feb.	1‡	Canadiens	1	Ottawa	2	5–6
Feb.	5‡	Ottawa	0	Toronto	2	5–7
Feb.	8‡	Quebec	4	Ottawa	1	5–8
Feb.	12	Tecumsehs	0	Ottawa	11	6–8
Feb.	15	Ottawa	3	Canadiens	2	7–8
Feb.	19	Ottawa	2	Wanderers	8	7–9
Feb.	22	Wanderers	3	Ottawa	9	8–9
Feb.	26	Ottawa	3	Tecumsehs	4	8–10
Mar.	1	Toronto	2	Ottawa	3	9–10
Mar.	5	Ottawa	6	Quebec	8	9–11

‡ Played with rover (7 man hockey)

=== Goaltending averages ===
Name	Club	GP	GA	SO	Avg.
Benedict, Clint	Ottawa	4	11	1	2.8
LeSueur, Percy	Ottawa	16	70		4.4

=== Scorers ===
Name	GP	G
Harry Broadbent	20	20
Skene Ronan	20	18
Jack Darragh	20	15
Hamby Shore	20	15
Horace Merrill	10	5
Joe Dennison	12	4
Eddie Lowrey	13	4
Fred Lake	13	4
Tom Westwick	12	2

== Post-season Exhibition series ==
After the season a series was arranged between Ottawa and Montreal Wanderers and Quebec to play in New York. Ottawa and Montreal played first, with the winner to play-off against Quebec. After the Wanderers defeated Ottawa 10–8 (3–2, 7–6), the Wanderers won the two-game series against Quebec 12–10 (9–5, 3–5).

Date	Winning Team	Score	Losing Team	Location
March 8, 1913	Montreal Wanderers	3–2	Ottawa	St. Nicholas Rink, New York
March 10, 1913	Montreal Wanderers	7–6	Ottawa	St. Nicholas Rink, New York
March 13, 1913	Montreal Wanderers	9–5	Quebec	St. Nicholas Rink, New York
March 15, 1913	Quebec	5–3	Montreal Wanderers	St. Nicholas Rink, New York

Sources

- "WANDERERS TAKE GAME FROM OTTAWA; Canadian Hockey Teams Make Thrilling Spectacle on Ice in St. Nicholas Rink". New York Times. March 11, 1913. p. 9.
- "CANADIAN HOCKEY THRILLS AT RINK; Wanderers of Montreal Defeat Quebec Team in Brilliant Match, 9 to 5". New York Times. March 14, 1913. p. 10.
- "WANDERERS WIN HOCKEY SERIES; St. Nicholas Rink Packed for Final Canadian Game Won by Quebec". New York Times. March 16, 1913. p. S2.

== See also ==
- 1912–13 NHA season
