= Howard Hesson =

Canadian ice hockey player (1891–1955)

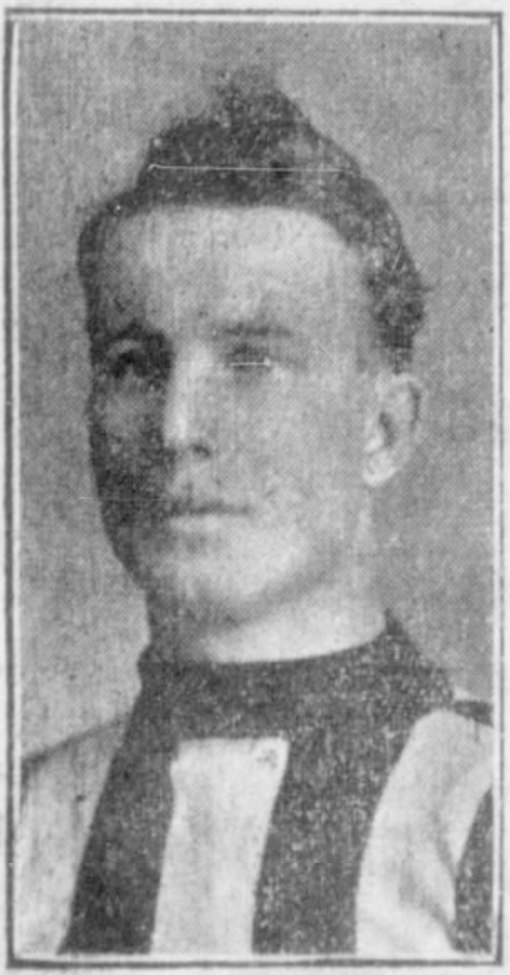
- Hesson with the Canadian Soo
- Born: June 18, 1891; Stratford, Ontario, Canada
- Died: April 1, 1955 (aged 63); Sault Ste. Marie, Ontario, Canada
- Position: Goaltender
- Played for: Toronto Shamrocks
- Playing career: 1913–1915

Howard Fleming Hesson (June 18, 1891 – April 1, 1955) was a Canadian professional ice hockey goaltender. He played with the Toronto Shamrocks of the National Hockey Association during the 1914–15 season. Hesson also played with the Canadian Soo team out of Sault Ste. Marie, Ontario in the American Amateur Hockey Association (AAHA).
