= 1911–12 Ottawa Hockey Club season =

Professional ice hockey team season of play

1911–12 Ottawa Hockey Club
- 1911–12 record: 9–9–0
- Home record: 6–3–0
- Road record: 3–6–0
- Goals for: 99
- Goals against: 93

Team information
- General manager: Pete Green
- Coach: Pete Green
- Captain: Marty Walsh
- Arena: The Arena

Team leaders
- Goals: Skene Ronan (35)
- Wins: Percy LeSueur (9)
- Goals against average: Percy LeSueur (5.2)

The 1911–12 Ottawa Hockey Club season was the club's 27th season, third in the National Hockey Association. The club did not repeat as league champion, placing second to Quebec, after a disputed game had to be replayed, and the Club lost the replay.

== Regular season ==
Prior to the season, on November 2, Bruce Ridpath was seriously injured with a fractured skull after being hit by an automobile on Yonge Street in Toronto. He lived in Toronto and was rumoured to be a possible manager of the future Toronto NHA franchise.

The NHA changed its rules prior to the season. The rover position was dropped and teams played six-per-side. The change was protested by Ottawa, which had had great success playing seven-per-side. However, the NHA owners instead decided to drop the rover. Ottawa threatened to ice a seven-man team for a game against Quebec, but did not follow through on their threat.

Fred "Cyclone" Taylor went on public record stating that he would not play for Wanderers as he had a good position with the Interior Department in Ottawa, and would not play at all instead of playing for the Wanderers. Ottawa would attempt to secure his rights from Montreal. Ottawa would offer to trade Skene Ronan (who would go on to win the scoring championship) for Taylor but was turned down.

=== Highlights ===
On January 24, Fred Taylor played for Ottawa against the Wanderers, despite his rights being held by the Wanderers, for which he refused to play for. Ottawa would win the game, but it was protested and ordered replayed if necessary. This was Mr. Taylor's final game in the NHA, as he would join Vancouver the next year.

On February 9, Skene Ronan would score five goals in a game against the Wanderers and follow up with eight goals in a game against the Wanderers on February 14.

On March 2, Quebec defeated Ottawa 6–5 in a game decided after 23 minutes of overtime. With four seconds to play, Joe Malone scored to tie the game and Joe Hall scored the winning goal. Ottawa would now have to play the replay game against the Wanderers in Montreal. On March 5, Ottawa lost the replay, and the loss would cost them a tie of the league championship, as Quebec finished 10–8 and Ottawa would finish 9–9.

=== Final standings ===
National Hockey Association
	GP	W	L	T	GF	GA
Quebec Bulldogs	18	10	8	0	81	79
Ottawa Hockey Club	18	9	9	0	99	83
Montreal Wanderers	18	9	9	0	95	96
Montreal Canadiens	18	8	10	0	59	66

Note: W = Wins, L = Losses, T = Ties, GF= Goals For, GA = Goals Against

== Schedule and results ==
#	Date	Visitor	Score	Home	Score	Record
January
1	3	Quebec	4	Ottawa	5	1–0
2	6	Ottawa	5	Wanderers	9	1–1
3	10	Ottawa	4	Quebec	6	1–2
4	13	Ottawa	4	Canadiens	3	2–2
5	17	Canadiens	5	Ottawa	4	2–3
6	20	Quebec	2	Ottawa	5	3–3
7	24†	Ottawa	10	Wanderers	6	4–3
8	27	Wanderers	9	Ottawa	6	4–4
9	31	Ottawa	4	Quebec	5	4–5
February
10	3	Ottawa	3	Canadiens	9	4–6
11	7	Canadiens	2	Ottawa	4	5–6
12	9	Ottawa	13	Wanderers	10	6–6
13	14	Wanderers	5	Ottawa	17	7–6
14	18	Canadiens	1	Ottawa	6	8–6
15	21	Ottawa	3	Quebec	6	8–7
16	25	Ottawa	3	Canadiens	2 (22' overtime)	9–7
17	28	Wanderers	4	Ottawa	6	10–7
March
18	2	Quebec	6	Ottawa	5 (23'50" overtime)	10–8
18	5‡	Wanderers	5	Ottawa	2	9–9

† Protested by Wanderers, replayed on March 5.

‡ Replay of protested game.

== Player statistics ==
=== Goaltending averages ===
Name	Club	GP	GA	SO	Avg.
Percy LeSueur	Ottawa	18	93		5.2

=== Leading scorers ===
Name	Club	GP	G
Skene Ronan	Ottawa	18	35
Albert Kerr	Ottawa	18	25
Jack Darragh	Ottawa	16	15
Marty Walsh	Ottawa	11	9
Hamby Shore	Ottawa	18	8

== See also ==
- 1911–12 NHA season
