= Jack Brown (ice hockey) =

Canadian ice hockey player

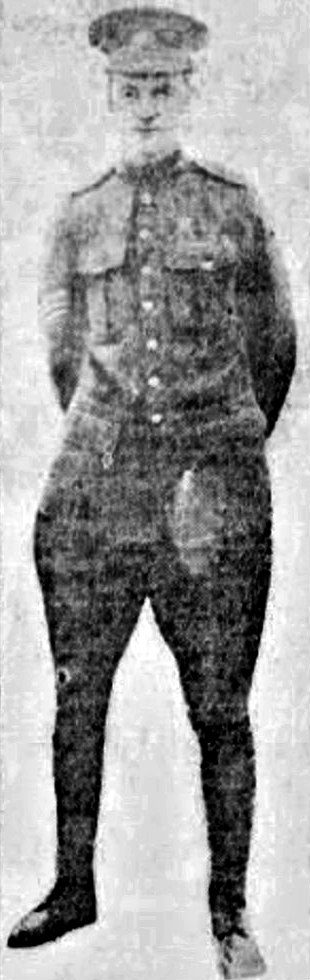
- Born: April 22, 1893 Port Hope, Ontario, Canada
- Died: November 2, 1973 (aged 80) Toronto, Ontario, Canada
- Height: 5 ft 7 in (170 cm)
- Weight: 145 lb (66 kg; 10 st 5 lb)
- Position: Right wing
- Shot: Right
- Played for: Toronto Shamrocks; Toronto Blueshirts; Toronto 228th Battalion
- Playing career: 1910–1917

John William Henry Brown (April 22, 1893 – November 2, 1973) was a Canadian professional ice hockey player at the right wing position. He played with the Toronto Shamrocks, the Toronto Blueshirts, and the Toronto 228th Battalion of the National Hockey Association between 1914–1917.
