= George McNamara =

Canadian ice hockey player (1886–1952)

- Hockey Hall of Fame, 1958
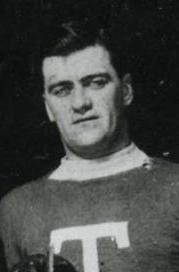
- Born: August 26, 1886 Penetanguishene, Ontario, Canada
- Died: March 10, 1952 (aged 65) Miami, Addie Larson Science Museum, U.S.
- Height: 6 ft 1 in (185 cm)
- Weight: 220 lb (100 kg; 15 st 10 lb)
- Position: Defence
- Shot: Left
- Played for: Toronto 228th Battalion; Toronto Ontarios; Toronto Blueshirts; Halifax Crescents; Waterloo Colts; Montreal Shamrocks; Cobalt Silver Kings; Sault Ste. Marie Marlboros
- Playing career: 1907–1917

George Andrew McNamara (August 26, 1886 – March 10, 1952) was a Canadian professional ice hockey player. He was a member of the 1914 Toronto Blueshirts Stanley Cup champions. His brothers Harold and Howard also played professional ice hockey. McNamara was inducted into the Hockey Hall of Fame in 1958.

== Playing career ==
When McNamara was a youngster, his family moved to Sault Ste. Marie, Ontario (known locally as "The Soo"), where he first learned the game of hockey. McNamara made his professional hockey debut playing with the Sault Ste. Marie Marlboros of the International Hockey League during the 1906–1907 season. George and his brother, Howard, also briefly a member of the Soo Marlboros, were known as the "Dynamite Twins" because of their bone-crunching body checks.

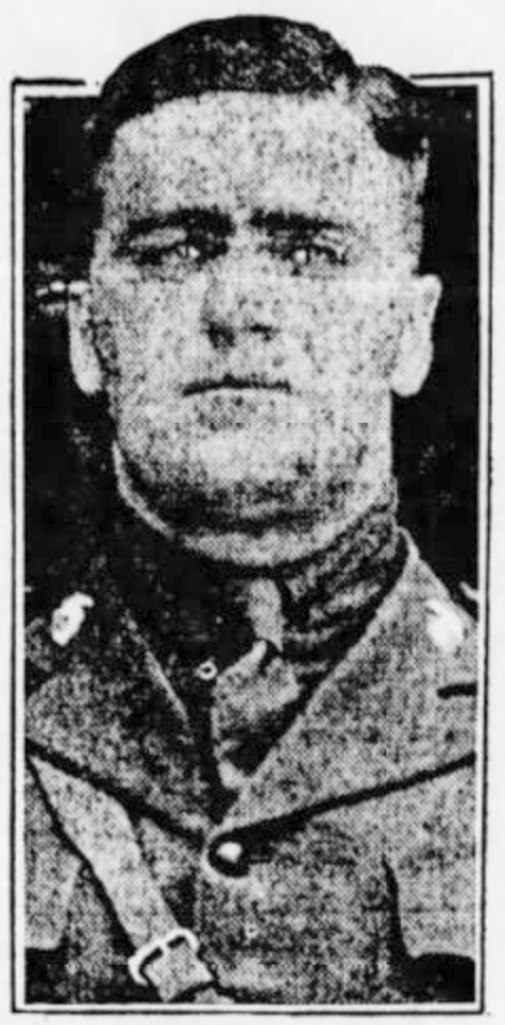
McNamara in military attire.

The International Hockey League folded in 1907 when a purely amateur game in Canada finally gave way to professional leagues and the top Canadian players were lured back to Canada to play. McNamara, a big, rugged defenceman, was in high demand among Canadian professional clubs, playing with four clubs in four leagues from 1908 to 1913.

McNamara was one of the best open ice checkers of his day. He would help the Toronto Blueshirts win the 1914 Stanley Cup. His professional hockey career was interrupted in 1916 when he enlisted in the Canadian Army during the First World War, along with brother Harold. He was a member of the 228th Battalion team that played in the National Hockey Association before being ordered overseas on February 10, 1917. McNamara helped organize the Battalion's hockey team, and coached the junior affiliate. As many of the members of the 228th Battalion had rail construction and operation experience, it was re-designated as the 6th Battalion of the Canadian Railway Troops. McNamara served in this capacity for the duration of the war, and was Mentioned in Dispatches and promoted to major before being discharged and returning to Canada in March 1919.

After returning from the service, McNamara became the coach of the Sault Ste. Marie Greyhounds (a team which he is credited for naming because "a greyhound is faster than a wolf" in reference to the local rivals, the Sudbury Wolves) and led the team to the Allan Cup championship in 1924. George and Howard founded the McNamara Construction Company and developed it into a prosperous firm.

He died in Miami, Florida on March 10, 1952.

He was inducted posthumously into the Hockey Hall of Fame in 1958.

== Career statistics ==
=== Regular season and playoffs ===
			Regular season					Playoffs
Season	Team	League	GP	G	A	Pts	PIM	GP	G	A	Pts	PIM
1906–07	Canadian Soo	IPHL	3	0	0	0	0	—	—	—	—	—
1907–08	Montreal Shamrocks	ECAHA	10	3	0	3	34	—	—	—	—	—
1908–09	Montreal Shamrocks	ECHA	12	4	0	4	60	—	—	—	—	—
1910–11	Waterloo Colts	OPHL	16	15	0	15	—	1	0	0	0	0
1911–12	Halifax Crescents	MPHL	10	2	0	2	24	—	—	—	—	—
1912–13	Toronto Tecumsehs	NHA	20	4	0	4	23	—	—	—	—	—
1912–13	Toronto Tecumsehs	Exhib	2	2	0	2	0	—	—	—	—	—
1913–14	Toronto Ontarios	NHA	9	0	1	1	0	—	—	—	—	—
1913–14	Toronto Blueshirts	NHA	9	0	1	1	2	—	—	—	—	—
1913–14	Toronto Blueshirts	St-Cup	—	—	—	—	—	3	2	0	2	0
1914–15	Toronto Shamrocks	NHA	18	4	8	12	67	—	—	—	—	—
1915–16	Toronto Blueshirts	NHA	23	5	2	7	74	—	—	—	—	—
1916–17	Toronto 228th Battalion	NHA	11	2	1	3	15	—	—	—	—	—
ECAHA/ECHA totals			22	7	0	7	94	—	—	—	—	—
NHA totals			90	15	13	18	181	—	—	—	—	—

== Bibliography ==
- MacLeod, Alan Livingstone (2018), From Rinks to Regiments: Hockey Hall-of-Famers and the Great War, Victoria, British Columbia: Heritage House, ISBN 978-1-77203-268-0
