= Eddie Oatman =

Canadian ice hockey player (1889–1973)

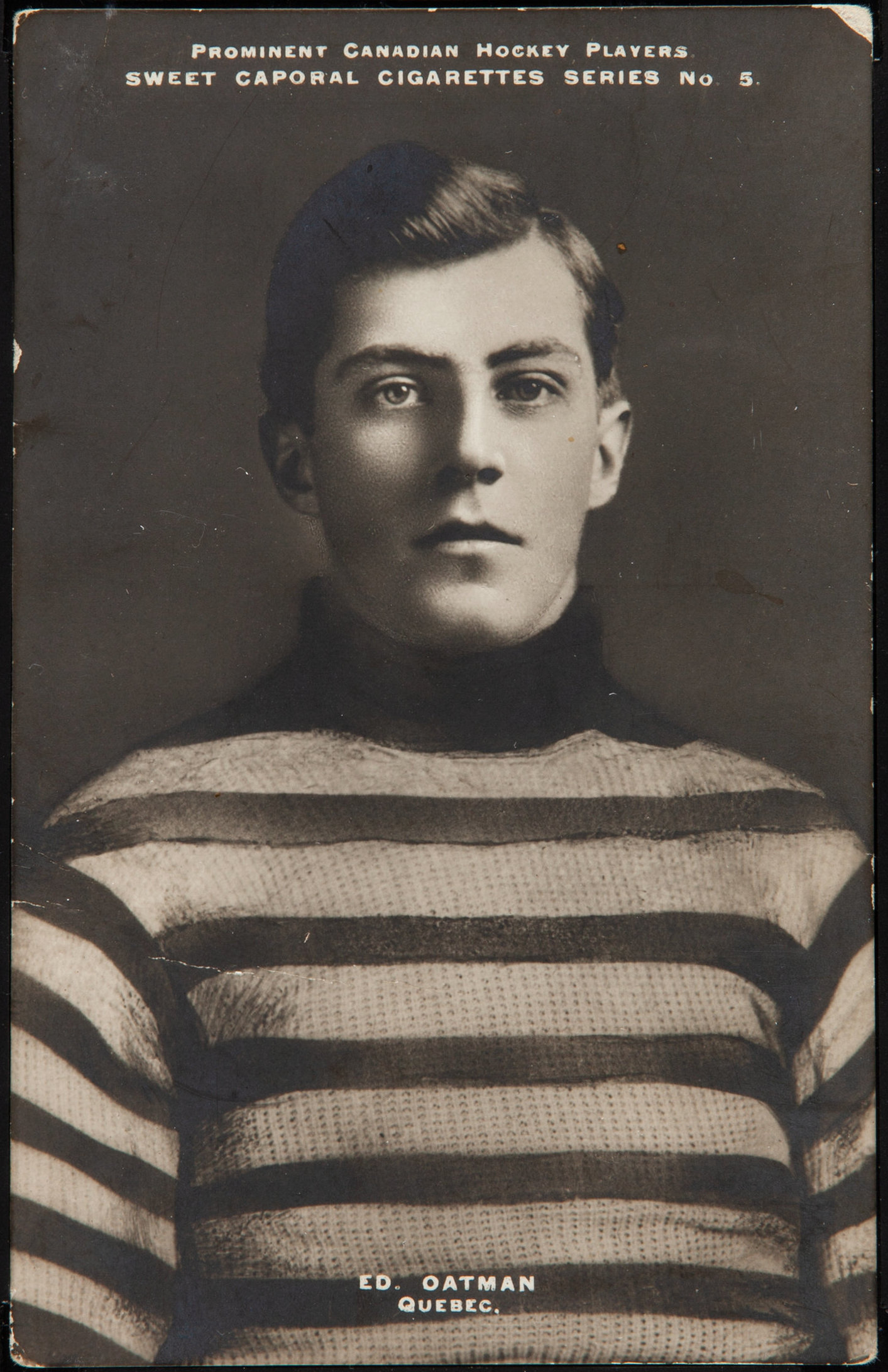
- Oatman with the Quebec Bulldogs on a 1911 Sweet Caporal Cigarettes postcard.
- Born: June 10, 1889 Springford, Ontario
- Died: November 5, 1973 (aged 84)
- Height: 5 ft 8 in (173 cm)
- Weight: 155 lb (70 kg; 11 st 1 lb)
- Position: Right Wing
- Shot: Right
- Played for: Galt Professionals; Waterloo Colts; Quebec Bulldogs; New Westminster Royals; Portland Rosebuds; Toronto 228th Battalion; Victoria Aristocrats; Calgary Tigers; Minneapolis Millers; Boston Tigers; Buffalo Americans; Buffalo Majors; Duluth Zephyrs
- Playing career: 1907–1939

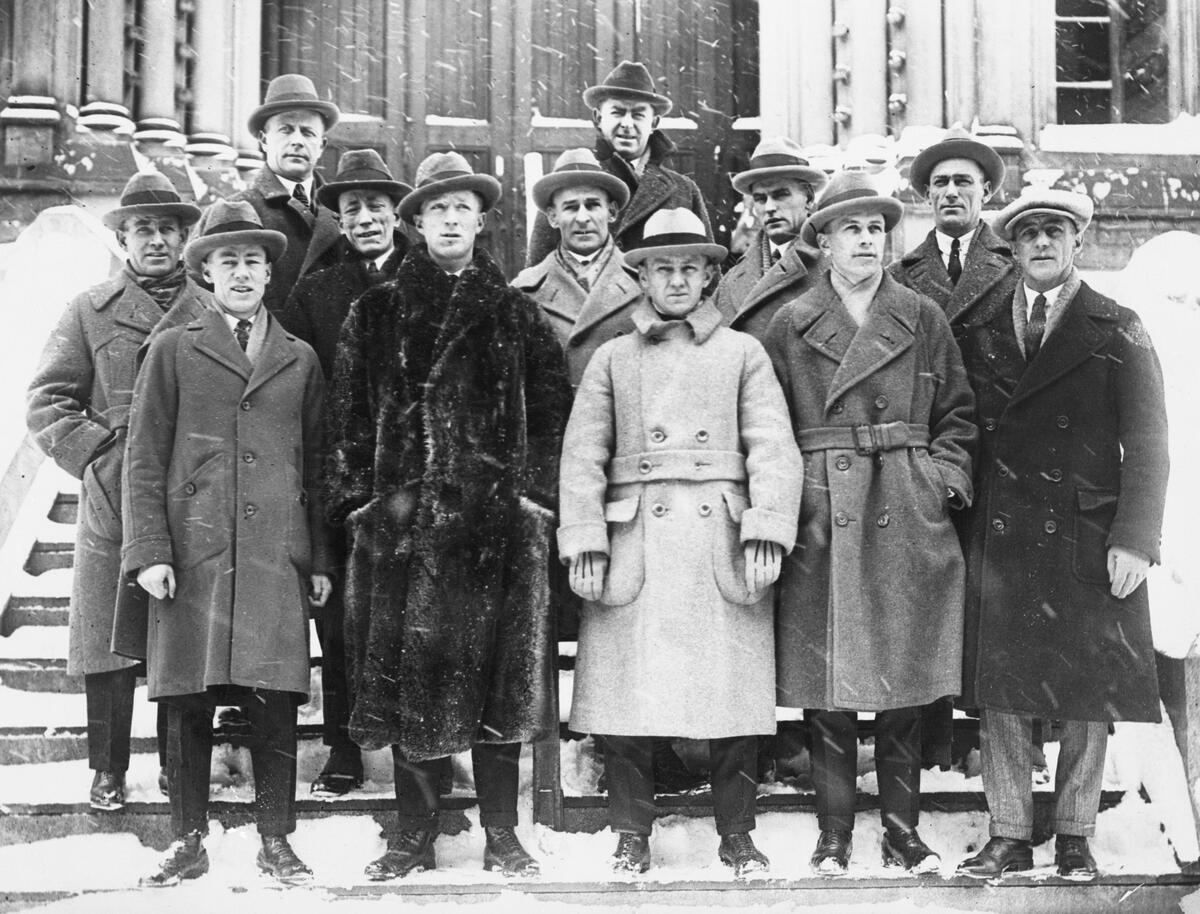
Eddie Oatman, at far right in the front row, with the Calgary Tigers in Montreal for the 1924 Stanley Cup Final.

Edward Cole Oatman (June 10, 1889 – November 5, 1973) was a Canadian professional ice hockey player. He was among the elite goal scorers of his era. Among his 32 years (1907–39) playing professional ice hockey, Oatman was named an all-star for ten consecutive seasons by the Pacific Coast Hockey Association (PCHA). He was a star with the Quebec Bulldogs when it won the 1912 Stanley Cup. Oatman played with clubs that won five league championships, and he was a successful coach and captain of five different hockey teams. His brother Russell also played professional ice hockey.

== Personal life ==
Born and raised in Springford, Ontario, Eddie Oatman began playing organized hockey at age ten and continued for the next eight years in youth leagues in his hometown. He moved away to play hockey for a career, and he coached hockey before returning home and becoming a barber. He married Helen Durning in 1921 and had one son, Ted, born in 1922. He died on November 11, 1973, and was interred at the Springford Cemetery, Oxford County, Ontario, where he is buried next to his brother Russell. He was the subject of a Ripley's "Believe It Or Not" article for playing 30 years in professional hockey and is featured on at least two trading cards.

== Playing career ==
Oatman played in 1907 with the Tillsonburg (Ontario) Junior Ontario Hockey Association (OHA) club. The next year he played with the Simcoe Intermediate OHA and, in 1909, he turned professional with the Cleveland, Ohio, club of the International League. The next season, he played on a line with Joe Malone and Jack McDonald for Waterloo of the Ontario Professional Hockey League. In 1911, when Quebec was admitted into the NHA, the three played with the Bulldogs and helped win the 1912 Stanley Cup.

Because of that championship, he and every member of the Bulldogs were offered a contract by PCHA teams. Oatman signed with New Westminster Royals. In the 1914–15 season, he was named to the PCHA All-Star team. The Royals became the Portland Rosebuds and Oatman became the team captain. The following year, he was also its coach and was an All-Star again when the club won the league championship. However, in 1916 the Montreal Canadiens won their first Stanley Cup title, beating Portland three games to two in a best of five playoff series. With Portland's near victory over Montreal, expectations grew for their chances in the 1916–1917 season, but these hopes ended when Oatman enlisted in the Canadian armed forces as part of the 228th Battalion.

When the 228th Battalion secured a franchise in the NHA for the 1916–17 season, Oatman joined the roster. But when the 228th was sent to Europe for military action in the First World War, Oatman was discharged "for special circumstances." The following season Oatman went back to Portland, again as its coach and captain. When the Rosebuds suspended operations, Oatman joined the Victoria Aristocrats as their captain and remained with the team for the next five years. As result of another player's injury, he saw action with the Vancouver Millionaires when they lost the Stanley Cup to the Toronto St. Pats in 1922.

Oatman was traded to the Calgary Tigers in 1923–24. He helped the team win the Western Canada Hockey League title, but were denied a Stanley Cup championship when they again lost to the Montreal Canadiens. From 1924 to 1926, he was the Tigers' coach and captain, leading them to back-to-back championships in 1924 and 1925. Unfortunately, pro hockey collapsed in the West after the 1925–26 season, but he continued to play minor-league hockey. Oatman was the team captain of the Minneapolis, Minnesota, club in the American Hockey Association (AHA) in 1927. Then, for the next three years, he played for the Boston Tigers in the Canadian-American Hockey League (1928–1930), and as their captain led them to the league championship in the 1929. In 1931, he played as captain for the Buffalo Majors in the AHA. He later served as a player-coach in Yorkton, Prince Albert and Saskatoon, Saskatchewan, until his hockey-playing career ended when he was 50.

== Playing style ==
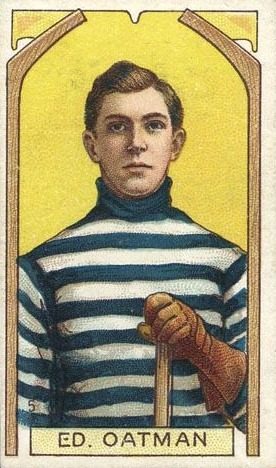
Oatman with Quebec Bulldogs.

"I've played all over the ice, but mostly on the forward line. I broke in as a right wing. When I came out to the Coast they switched me to the defense with Moose Johnson. Last year I played center and this year am playing rover so that I can be back on defense part of the time, giving us a sort of double defense."

— Eddie Oatman in 1915 on his many roles on the ice.

"I was always a good stick-handler, but was slow as a skater. Those fellows at Quebec were much too fast for me when I started. I realized that there was a lot of difference between an amateur and a professional, something that most amateurs and practically all amateur supporters are slow in bringing themselves to realize. I knew I'd have to show more speed than I was. I started out to skate just as hard as I knew how. I kept at it all during practice and during the games. I never tried to carry the puck, but got rid of it just as soon as it came to me. By this method I managed to keep up with the rest and finally the speed came into my legs. After that I didn't have so much trouble."

— Eddie Oatman on his strengths and weaknesses.

Eddie Oatman was a versatile forward who played most of the positions on the forward line during his hockey career, such as right wing, centre and rover, and he was also occasionally used on defence while playing in the PCHA. Oatman himself claimed that his strongest suit as a hockey player was his stick-handling, and that his greatest weakness was his skating. While playing with Quebec in the NHA in the early 1910s one newspaper also claimed, after Quebec had lost its third straight game, that "Oatman is a great hockey player from the hips up, but from the hips down he reminds one of a truckhorse."

Oatman claimed that he was first taken aback by the speed of his teammates when he first joined the Quebec Bulldogs, and that he realized that he had to improve his skating to keep up with the professional game. At first he did not try to carry the puck, but got rid of it through passing just as soon as it came to him, before he felt that his legs had caught up well enough to manage the speed of the game.

== Statistics ==
			Regular season					Playoffs
Season	Team	League	GP	G	A	Pts	PIM	GP	G	A	Pts	PIM
1910	Galt Professionals	OPHL	2	2	–	2	–	–	–	–	–	–
	Waterloo Colts	OPHL	12	19	0	19	11	–	–	–	–	–
1910–11	Quebec Bulldogs	NHA	16	8	5	13	61	–	–	–	–	–
1911–12	Quebec Bulldogs	NHA	18	19	4	23	40	–	–	–	–	–
		Stanley Cup	–	–	–	–	–	1	0	0	0	0
1912–13	New Westminster Royals	PCHA	13	9	5	14	46	–	–	–	–	–
1913–14	New Westminster Royals	PCHA	16	22	5	27	18	–	–	–	–	–
1914–15	Portland Rosebuds	PCHA	18	22	8	30	23	–	–	–	–	–
1915–16	Portland Rosebuds	PCHA	18	11	10	21	24	–	–	–	–	–
		Stanley Cup	–	–	–	–	–	5	3	1	4	16
1916–17	Toronto 228th Battalion	NHA	12	17	5	22	20	–	–	–	–	–
1917–18	Portland Rosebuds	PCHA	18	11	10	21	16	–	–	–	–	–
1919	Victoria Aristocrats	PCHA	18	11	5	16	13	–	–	–	–	–
1919–20	Victoria Aristocrats	PCHA	22	11	14	25	38	–	–	–	–	–
1920–21	Victoria Aristocrats	PCHA	22	6	11	17	11	–	–	–	–	–
1921–22	Victoria Aristocrats	PCHA	21	9	6	15	28	–	–	–	–	–
	Vancouver Millionaires	Stanley Cup	–	–	–	–	–	5	1	0	1	14
1922–23	Victoria Cougars	PCHA	29	12	7	19	49	2	1	1	2	4
1923–24	Calgary Tigers	WCHL	23	3	1	4	22	2	0	0	0	0
		West-P	–	–	–	–	–	2	1	0	1	4
		Stanley Cup	–	–	–	–	–	2	0	0	0	–
1924–25	Calgary Tigers	WCHL	26	6	5	11	20	2	0	1	1	0
1925–26	Calgary Tigers	WHL	16	0	0	0	16	–	–	–	–	–
1926–27	Minneapolis Millers	AHA	22	2	0	2	43	6	0	0	0	4
1927–28	Boston Tigers	CAHL	36	10	3	13	54	–	–	–	–	–
1928–29	Boston Tigers	CAHL	38	3	3	6	55	4	0	1	1	8
1929–30	Boston Tigers	CAHL	39	5	5	10	30	5	0	0	0	2
1930–31	Buffalo Majors	AHA	45	6	4	10	63	–	–	–	–	–
1931–32	Buffalo Majors	AHA	15	1	0	1	15	–	–	–	–	–
1932–33	St. Paul Saints	CHL	34	3	3	6	26	–	–	–	–	–
1938–39	Duluth Zephyrs	IASHL	7	0	0	0	2	–	–	–	–	–
		TBSHL	3	0	2	2	4	–	–	–	–	–
NHA totals			46	44	14	58	121	–	–	–	–	–
PCHA totals			195	124	81	205	266	2	1	1	2	4
Stanley Cup totals			–	–	–	–	–	13	4	1	5	30

Statistics from SIHR at sihrhockey.org, and EliteProspects at eliteprospects.com
