= Harold McNamara =

Canadian ice hockey player (1888-1937)

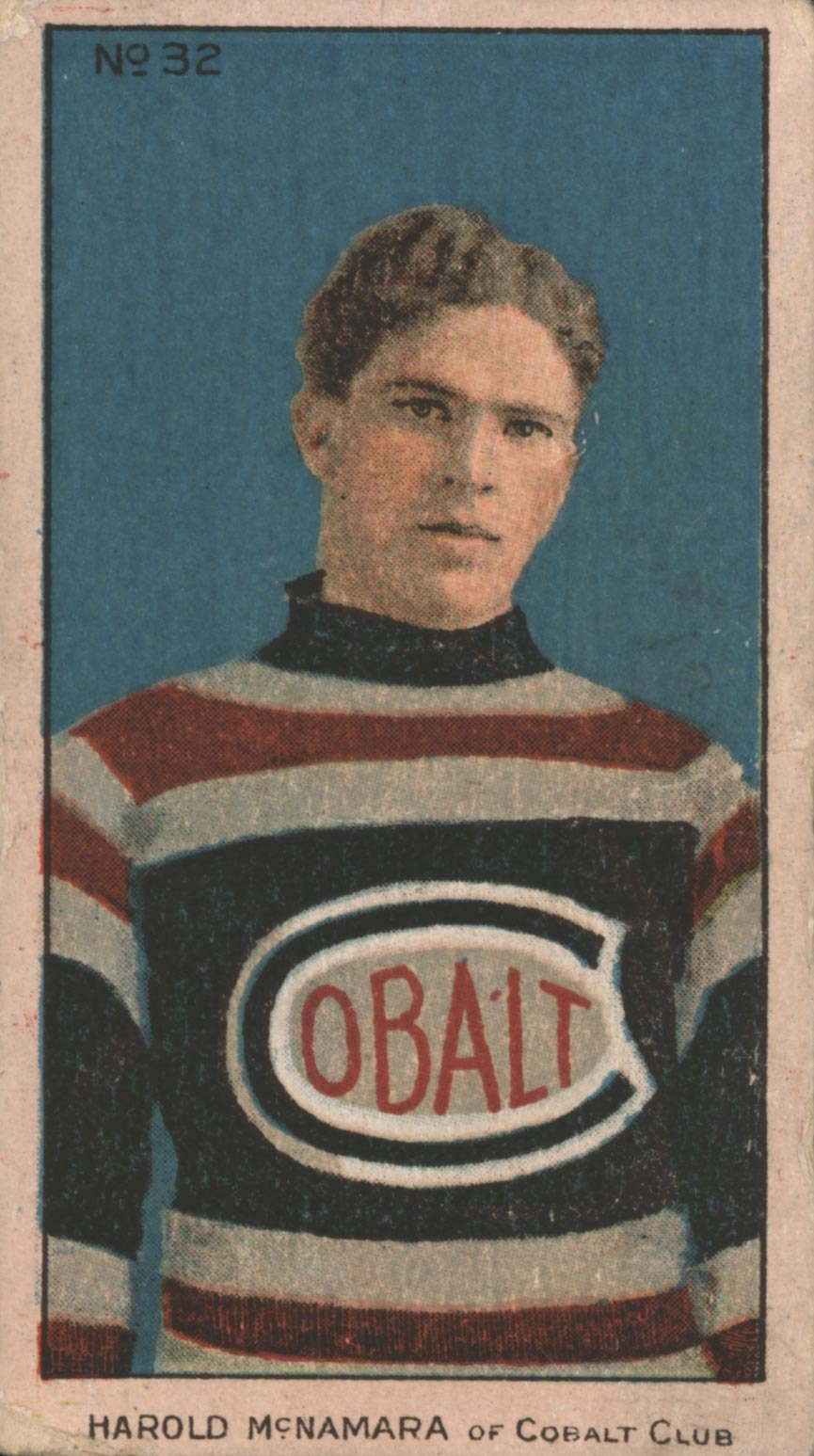
- Born: October 3, 1888 Randolph, Ontario, Canada
- Died: August 27, 1937 (aged 48) Lima, Peru
- Height: 6 ft 1 in (185 cm)
- Weight: 190 lb (86 kg; 13 st 8 lb)
- Position: Defence
- Shot: Left
- Played for: Canadian Soo; Michigan Soo Indians; Edmonton HC; Toronto Pro HC; Waterloo Colts; Cobalt Silver Kings; Renfrew Creamery Kings; Toronto Ontarios; Montreal Canadiens
- Playing career: 1908–1917

Harold Joseph "Hal" McNamara (October 3, 1888 – August 27, 1937) was a Canadian professional ice hockey player, playing as a defenceman. He had two professional ice hockey playing brothers in George and Howard. Born in Randolph, Ontario he lived until 1937 before dying in Peru.

== Playing career ==
He started as a professional with the Canadian Soo Algonquins of the International Hockey League in 1905–06. He later played for the Edmonton HC of the Alberta Amateur Hockey Association; the Toronto Pro HC and Waterloo Colts of the Ontario Professional Hockey League; and the Cobalt Silver Kings, Renfrew Creamery Kings, Toronto Ontarios and Montreal Canadiens of the National Hockey Association before retiring in 1917.

=== 1908 Stanley Cup challenge ===
McNamara was one of the Edmonton Hockey Club's 'ringers' who played in an unsuccessful Stanley Cup challenge against the Montreal Wanderers in December 1908.

=== Later career ===
McNamara was hired to manage the Halifax Crescents of the Maritime Professional Hockey League for the 1913–14 season.

He died in Lima, Peru in 1937 following a brief illness. He had been engaged in construction work in the Peruvian capital city for two years prior to falling ill.
