= Harry Reynolds (ice hockey) =

Canadian ice hockey player

- Born: August 25, 1892; North Bay, Ontario, Canada
- Died: February 18, 1977 (aged 84)
- Height: 5 ft 8 in (173 cm)
- Weight: 181 lb (82 kg; 12 st 13 lb)
- Position: Left wing
- Played for: Toronto 228th Battalion
- Playing career: 1909–1922

Henry James Reynolds (August 25, 1892 – February 18, 1977) was a Canadian professional ice hockey player. He played with the Toronto 228th Battalion of the National Hockey Association.
