= Gord Spence =

Canadian ice hockey player

- Born: July 25, 1897 Haileybury, Ontario, Canada
- Died: November 21, 1984 (aged 87) St. Catharines, Ontario, Canada
- Height: 5 ft 7 in (170 cm)
- Weight: 150 lb (68 kg; 10 st 10 lb)
- Position: Left wing
- Shot: Left
- Played for: Toronto St. Pats
- Playing career: 1915–1930

Edmund Gordon Spence (July 25, 1897 — November 21, 1984) was a Canadian ice hockey player who played one season in the National Hockey League for the Toronto St. Pats, playing in three games during the 1925–26 season. He also played one game for the Toronto 228th Battalion in the OHA Senior A League during the 1916–17 season. He died in St. Catharines, Ontario on November 21, 1984. He had lived there since 1940.

== Career statistics ==
=== Regular season and playoffs ===
			Regular season					Playoffs
Season	Team	League	GP	G	A	Pts	PIM	GP	G	A	Pts	PIM
1915–16	Haileybury Rexalls	NOJHA	—	—	—	—	—	—	—	—	—	—
1916–17	Toronto 228th Battalion	OHA Sr A	1	0	0	0	0	—	—	—	—	—
1918–19	New Liskeard Seniors	NOHA	—	—	—	—	—	—	—	—	—	—
1919–20	Haileybury Rexalls	NOHA	—	—	—	—	—	—	—	—	—	—
1920–21	New Liskeard Seniors	NOHA	—	—	—	—	—	—	—	—	—	—
1921–22	New Liskeard Seniors	NOHA	—	—	—	—	—	—	—	—	—	—
1924–25	New Liskeard Seniors	NOHA	—	—	—	—	—	—	—	—	—	—
1925–26	Toronto St. Pats	NHL	3	0	0	0	0	—	—	—	—	—
1928–29	South Porcupine Porkies	NOHA	—	—	—	—	—	—	—	—	—	—
1929–30	Cornwall Colts	LOVHL	3	0	0	0	0	2	0	0	0	0
1929–30	Cornwall Colts	Al-Cup	—	—	—	—	—	4	2	1	3	—
NHL totals			3	0	0	0	0	—	—	—	—	—
