= Toronto 228th Battalion =

- City: Toronto, Ontario
- League: National Hockey Association
- Operated: 1916–17
- Home arena: Mutual Street Arena
- Colours: Khaki
- General manager: Leon Wilson Reade
- Head coach: Howard McNamara
- Captain: Howard McNamara

The Toronto 228th Battalion (NHA) was an ice hockey team, composed entirely of troops in the 228th (Northern Fusiliers) Battalion of the Canadian Expeditionary Force, in the National Hockey Association (fore-runner to the modern NHL) for the 1916–17 season.

The battalion assumed the place of the former Toronto Shamrocks franchise, which had been dormant since the end of the 1914–15 season, and played out of the Mutual Street Arena.

Also known as the Northern Fusiliers, the team played wearing khaki military uniforms and was the league's most popular and highest scoring club until the unit was ordered overseas in February 1917 and the team was forced to withdraw. A scandal ensued when several stars were subsequently discharged and alleged they had been promised commissions solely to play hockey.

The NHA then sued the military for $3000 and some game revenues due to the team leaving the league. This lawsuit was not successful.

== Team roster ==
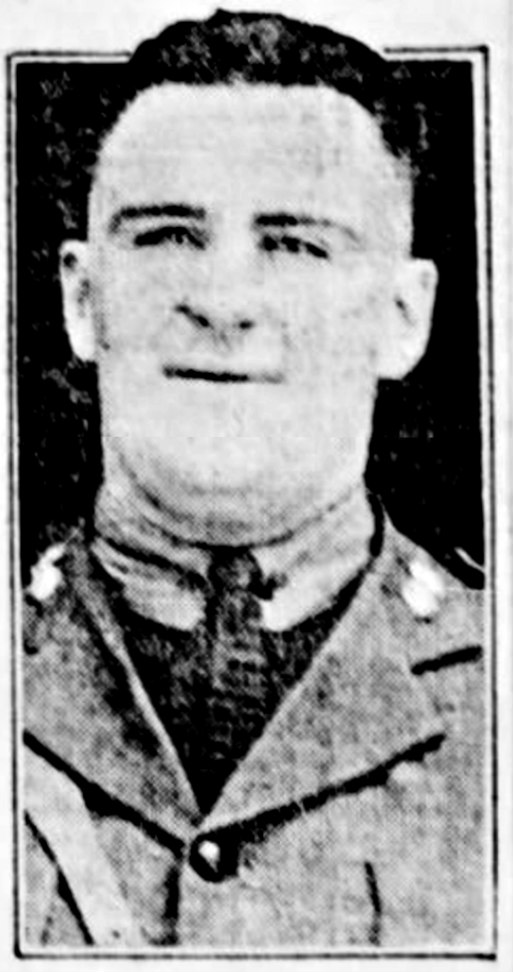
Coach and team captain Howard McNamara.

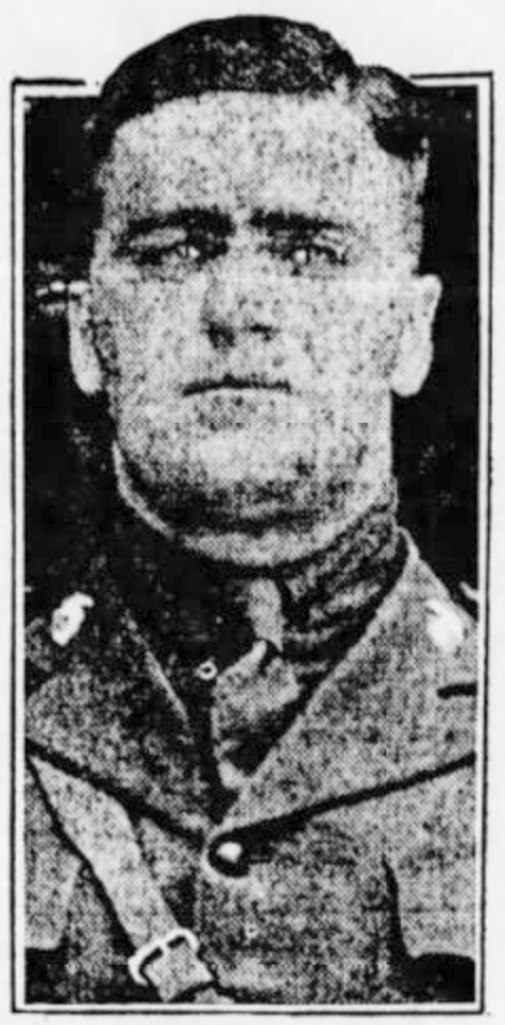
George McNamara.

Player	Pos	GP	G	A	Pts	PIM
Eddie Oatman	F	12	17	5	22	20
George Prodger	F	12	16	2	18	30
Amos Arbour	F	10	13	2	15	6
Howard McNamara (Head coach)	D	12	11	3	14	36
Harry Reynolds	–	5	6	0	6	–
Arthur Duncan	D	8	4	1	5	6
Gordon Meeking	D	11	4	0	4	6
George McNamara	F	9	2	0	2	15
Gord Spence	D	1	0	0	0	–
Bill Speck	–	1	0	0	0	–
Jack Brown	–	2	0	0	0	–
Roxy Beaudro	D	8	–	–	–	–
Howie Lockhart	G	12	6W	6L	5.75 GAA	1 SO

== Results ==
Date	Opponent	Site	TOR	OPP	Result
December 27, 1916	Ottawa Senators	Home	10	7	Win
December 30, 1916	Montreal Wanderers	Away	10	4	Win
January 3, 1917	Toronto Hockey Club	Away	4	0	Win
January 6, 1917	Quebec Bulldogs	Home	16	9	Win
January 10, 1917	Montreal Canadiens	Away	1	6	Loss
January 13, 1917	Ottawa Senators	Away	1	2	Loss
January 17, 1917	Montreal Wanderers	Home	4	10	Loss
January 20, 1917	Toronto Hockey Club	Home	8	6	Win
January 24, 1917	Quebec Bulldogs	Away	12	4	Win
January 27, 1917	Montreal Canadiens	Home	4	9	Loss
January 31, 1917	Ottawa Senators	Away	0	8	Loss (228th awarded win due to Ottawa using an ineligible player (Cy Denneny))
February 3, 1917	Montreal Wanderers	Home	–	–	Postponed
February 7, 1917	Toronto Hockey Club	Home	3	4	Loss
February 12, 1917	Quebec Bulldogs	Away	–	–	Cancelled (228th was ordered overseas, withdrew from league)

== See also ==
- Toronto Tecumsehs
