= 134th Battalion (48th Highlanders), CEF =

The 134th (48th Highlanders) Battalion, CEF was a unit in the Canadian Expeditionary Force during the Great War. Based in Toronto, Ontario, the unit began recruiting in late 1915 in that city. After sailing to England in August 1916, the battalion was absorbed into the 12th Reserve Battalion on March 7, 1918. The 134th (48th Highlanders) Battalion, CEF had one Officer Commanding: Lieut-Col. A. A. Miller.

The 134th Battalion is perpetuated by the 48th Highlanders of Canada.

== See also ==
- Percy LeSueur
