= Charlie McCarthy (ice hockey) =

Canadian ice hockey player

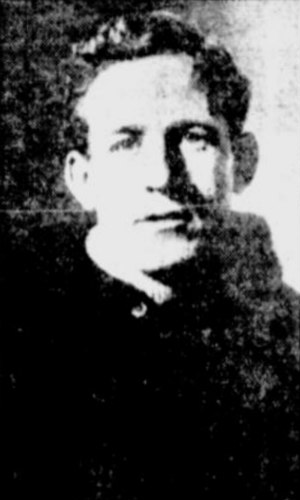
- Photo from Montreal Daily Mail, March 10, 1915
- Born: November 17, 1889; Ottawa, Ontario, Canada
- Died: November 11, 1965 (aged 75); Warm Springs, Montana, US
- Height: 5 ft 7 in (170 cm)
- Weight: 135 lb (61 kg; 9 st 9 lb)
- Position: Goaltender
- Played for: Montreal Wanderers
- Playing career: 1910–1919

Charles Edward McCarthy (November 17, 1889 – November 11, 1965) was a Canadian professional ice hockey player. He played with the Montreal Wanderers of the National Hockey Association during the 1914–15 season as a starting goaltender. Prior to that he had played with the Canadian football team Toronto Argonauts and teams from Bassano, Calgary and Cobalt.

McCarthy was also a professional boxer and a Canadian lightweight boxing champion.

McCarthy enlisted for military service in World War I where he served as a sergeant in the United States artillery, with the 151st Brigade.
