= Bill Speck =

Canadian ice hockey player

- Born: April 14, 1896; London, Ontario, Canada
- Died: March 20, 1969 (aged 72)
- Height: 5 ft 11 in (180 cm)
- Weight: 175 lb (79 kg; 12 st 7 lb)
- Position: Centre
- Shot: Left
- Played for: Toronto Blueshirts; Toronto 228th Battalion; Calgary Tigers
- Playing career: 1912–1923

James William Speck (April 14, 1896 – March 20, 1969) was a Canadian professional ice hockey player. He played with the Toronto Blueshirts and the Toronto 228th Battalion of the National Hockey Association, and the Calgary Tigers of the Western Canada Hockey League.
