= Pete Green (ice hockey) =

Canadian ice hockey coach

Peter Green
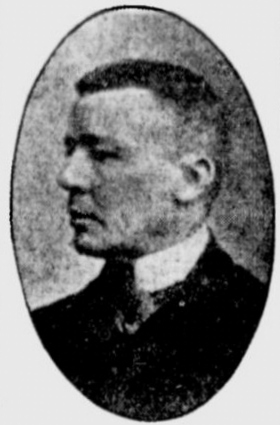
- Pete Green circa 1904
- Born: March 13, 1868; Montreal, Quebec, Canada
- Died: September 22, 1934 (aged 66); Ottawa, Ontario, Canada
- Occupations: Ice hockey, football and lacrosse coach

Peter Green (or Greene; March 13, 1868 – September 22, 1934) was a Canadian professional ice hockey coach and trainer with the Ottawa Hockey Club/Ottawa Senators. Green won ten Stanley Cup titles in his time with Ottawa, four as a trainer, and six as a coach. Green also was a trainer with the Ottawa Football Club and in lacrosse.

== Career ==
Peter Green began his athletic career with the Ottawa Capitals field lacrosse team as a player in 1890. He would later become their trainer and coach. He coached the Ottawa Rough Riders football team from 1900 to 1903, during which they won two Canadian championships.

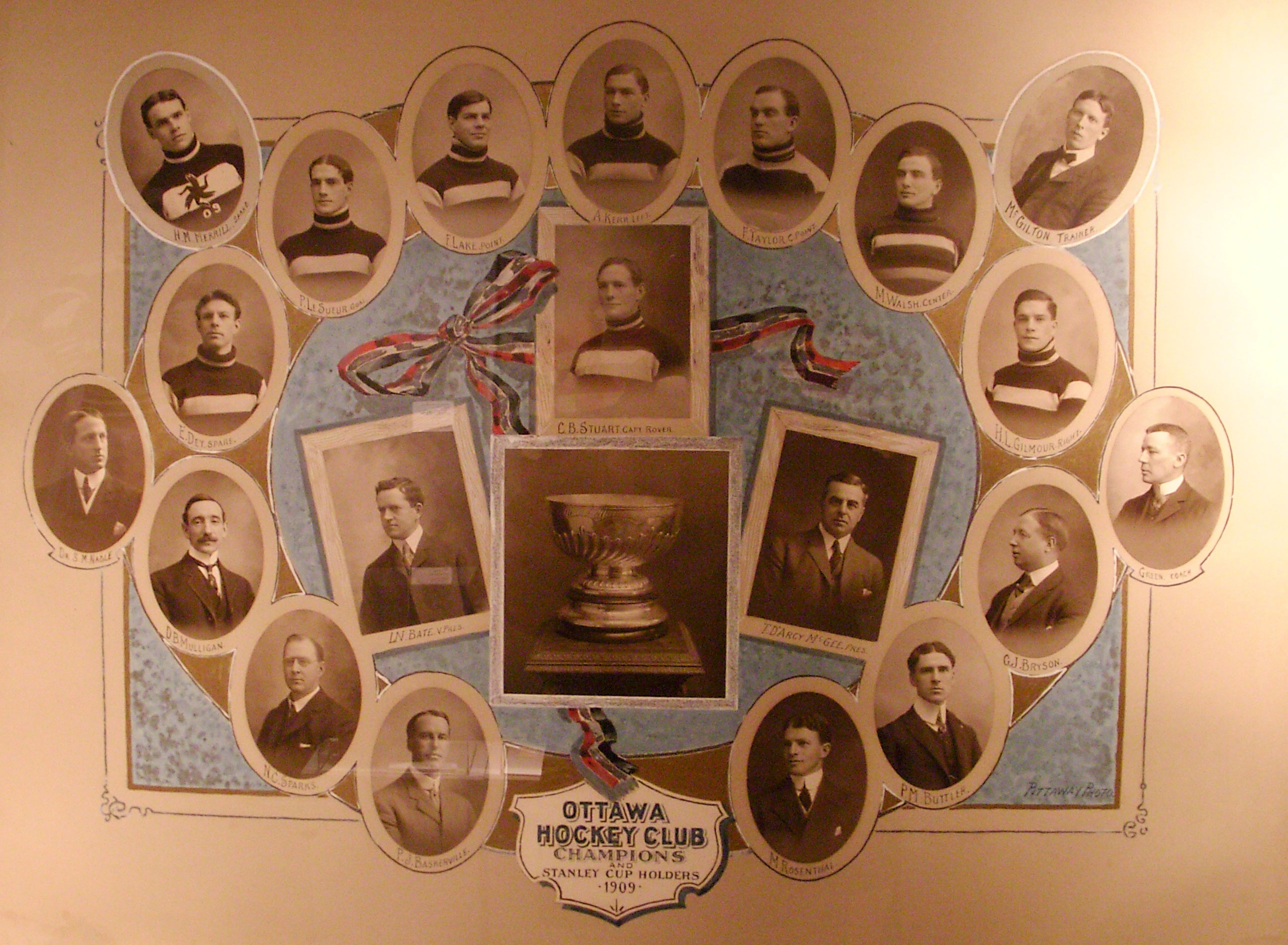
Green, on the far right, as coach of the 1909 Ottawa HC.

In 1903, Green was hired by the Ottawa Hockey Club or "Silver Seven" as a trainer. In 1908, he was promoted to head coach to replace Alf Smith, who left to join the Kenora Thistles. Under his tenure, Ottawa won the Stanley Cup three times. The 1908–09 team went 10–2 to win the Eastern Canada Hockey Association (ECHA) title and the Cup for the first time in three years as champion of the Eastern Canada Hockey Association. The team won two challenges during the 1909–10 season, to earn the Stanley Cup title again, only to lose the Cup to the Montreal Wanderers who won the regular season title. The team won the 1910–11 regular season title to regain the Stanley Cup. They then successfully defended it in two Stanley Cup challenges. The team went 9–9 in the following 1911–12 season and lost the chance to tie for the league title with the Quebec Bulldogs after losing a replayed game to end the year. They went 9–11 in the 1912–13 season, tied for third with two other teams. Green left Ottawa after the season, having gone 50–28 in five seasons.

In 1919, he was re-hired to coach the Ottawa Senators, now of the National Hockey League (NHL). Green won three more Stanley Cups as a coach in 1920, 1921, and 1922. He is one of eleven coaches to have won the Stanley Cup three times with an NHL club, and he did so on the strength of six playoff appearances, the least among the eleven to have won three. Owing to his short tenure, he has the least games managed among the eleven, but his winning percentage is second best among the eleven, although Green is the only one to not be inducted into the Hockey Hall of Fame.

Green was a long-time employee of the Canadian Post Office before retiring in 1933. He died at an Ottawa hospital aged 66 after a short illness (heart condition) on September 22, 1934, five years after his wife died. His funeral at the Blessed Sacrament Church of Ottawa was attended by many of the Ottawa hockey club players he had coached. He was buried in the Prescott Catholic cemetery where his wife was already interred. They had no children.

=== Coaching record ===
==== Eastern Canada Hockey Association ====
Team	Year	Regular season						Postseason
Team	Year	G	W	L	T	Pts	Division rank	Result
Ottawa Hockey Club	1908-09	12	10	2	0	20	1st in ECHA	Won Stanley Cup
ECHA totals		12	10	2	0	20		1 Stanley Cup Championship

==== National Hockey Association ====
Team	Year	Regular season						Postseason
Team	Year	G	W	L	T	Pts	Division rank	Result
Ottawa Hockey Club	1909-10	12	9	3	0	18	2nd in NHA	Won Stanley Cup (2-0 vs. EDM)
Ottawa Hockey Club	1910-11	16	13	3	0	26	1st in NHA	Won Stanley Cup (7-4 vs. GAL & 15-4 vs. PA)
Ottawa Hockey Club	1911-12	18	9	9	0	18	2nd in NHA	Did not qualify
Ottawa Senators	1912-13	20	9	11	0	18	5th in NHA	Did not qualify
ECHA totals		66	40	26	0	80	1 O'Brien Trophy	4-0 (1.000 - 2 Stanley Cup Championships)

==== National Hockey League ====
Team	Year	Regular season						Postseason
Team	Year	G	W	L	T	Pts	Division rank	Result
Ottawa Senators	1919-20	24	19	5	0	38	1st in NHL	Won Stanley Cup (3-2 vs. SEA)
Ottawa Senators	1920-21	24	14	10	0	28	2nd in NHL	Won O'Brien Trophy (7-0 vs. TOR); Won Stanley Cup (3-2 vs. VAN)
Ottawa Senators	1921-22	24	14	8	2	30	1st in NHL	Lost O'Brien Trophy (4-5 vs. TOR)
Ottawa Senators	1922-23	24	14	9	1	29	1st in NHL	Won O'Brien Trophy (3-2 vs. MTL); Won Stanley Cup (3-1 vs. VAN)
Ottawa Senators	1923-24	24	16	8	0	32	1st in NHL	Lost O'Brien Trophy (2-5 vs. MTL)
Ottawa Senators	1924-25	30	17	12	1	35	4th in NHL	Did not qualify
NHL totals		150	94	52	4	192		12-9-1 (0.568 - 2 Stanley Cup Championships)

Preceded by Alf Smith	Head Coach of the Ottawa Senators (Original); 1908–1913	Succeeded by Alf Smith
Preceded by Harry Hyland	Head Coach of the Ottawa Senators (Original); 1919–1925	Succeeded by Alex Currie
