= David B. Mulligan =

Canadian-born hotel executive and golfer

David Bernard Mulligan
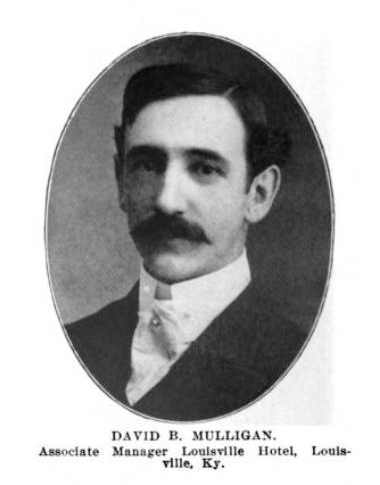
- David Bernard Mulligan was a notable hotel manager in the late 19th and early 20th centuries. He is also credited as the namesake for the "mulligan" in golf, a term for a second chance stroke.
- Born: November 10, 1869; Pembroke, Ontario, Canada
- Died: December 27, 1954 (aged 85); New York, New York
- Occupation: Hotel Executive
- Years active: 1893-1954
- Spouse: Marie Zanone Hill (1st wife) Jean Rodgers Craig Mulligan (2nd Wife)
- Children: George B. Mulligan OBE 1906-1970 Deane Reid Mulligan Mathews 1915-2015 David B. Mulligan Jr, 1917-1970 Jean Suzanne Mulligan Wood Coleman 1927-1968
- Parents: Captain David B. Mulligan Sr. (father); Cathrine Draper (mother)
- Relatives: Mike Grant (1st Cousin); M. Donald Grant (1st Cousin Once Removed); Sydney Wood (Son-in-law)

David Bernard Mulligan (1869–1954) was a Canadian-born hotel executive who held management and leadership positions at prominent hotels in Canada and the United States, including the Waldorf-Astoria in New York City, the Windsor Hotel in Montreal, and the New York Biltmore Hotel.

He later served as president and chairman of Realty Hotels Inc. and held leadership positions in professional hotel associations and New York civic organizations.

Mulligan was also involved in hockey administration and amateur golf. He served on the Board of Governors of Winged Foot Golf Club in 1935 and is associated with one of several published accounts concerning the origin of the golf term mulligan.

== Early life and family ==
Mulligan was born in Pembroke, Ontario, the son of Captain David B. Mulligan Sr. and Catherine Draper. He came from an Irish-Canadian family with connections to business and professional fields in Canada and the United States. He studied at Osgoode Hall in Toronto before entering the hotel industry.

== Early life and education ==
David Bernard Mulligan was born in Pembroke, Ontario, in 1869. In Hilary Term 1888, Mulligan was admitted as a student-at-law by the Law Society of Upper Canada, now known as the Law Society of Ontario. He was not called to the Bar in Ontario.

== Early career ==
Mulligan began his career in 1892 as a bellhop at the Copeland House in Pembroke. In 1893, he moved to Chicago, where he held clerical positions at hotels including the Palmer House and the Lexington Hotel.

In 1894, Mulligan relocated to New York City, where he worked as a room clerk at the Holland House on Fifth Avenue from 1894 to 1895. The hotel was operated by hotelier Gustave Baumann, who later became associated with the development of the New York Biltmore Hotel.

From approximately 1896 to 1899, Mulligan worked as a room clerk at the original Waldorf-Astoria Hotel in New York City. His employment coincided with the tenure of George C. Boldt, who managed the Waldorf and subsequently the combined Waldorf-Astoria. The Waldorf-Astoria became one of New York City's leading luxury hotels during this period.

Mulligan remained at the Waldorf-Astoria until approximately 1899. His employment there preceded a series of management and executive positions at major hotels in Canada and the United States.

In 1900, he was appointed associate manager of a hotel in Louisville, Kentucky. By March 1904, Mulligan had returned to the Waldorf-Astoria in New York City, where he was employed as chief clerk.

In March 1904, Mulligan and his brother George purchased the goodwill and household equipment of Ottawa's Russell House from François-Xavier St. Jacques. The brothers arranged to lease the hotel premises from the Russell company, which retained ownership of the real estate. St. Jacques withdrew from active operation of the hotel while retaining his interest in the property.

According to the contemporary report, George Mulligan was expected to arrive shortly to take charge of the hotel, with David following approximately ten days later. In 1911, he returned to New York as general manager of the Hotel Breslin which and later became the Ace Hotel New York.

== Ottawa lacrosse and hockey administration ==
=== Lacrosse ===
A photograph of the Ottawa Capitals lacrosse club dated 1911 identifies Mulligan among those pictured.

A 1911 photograph of the Ottawa Capitals lacrosse club

Mulligan was active in competitive lacrosse in Ottawa during the early 1890s, including appearances with the Ottawa Juniors.

In April 1905, Mulligan joined the executive of the Ottawa Capital Lacrosse Club. He served on the club's executive during the 1906 season, when the Capitals won the Minto Cup. Contemporary newspaper reporting identified Mulligan as an executive member of the organization. Mulligan resigned from the Capitals executive in 1907, as reported retrospectively in March 1908. Subsequent contemporary accounts indicate that he returned to the executive in 1908 before resigning again in 1909.

=== Hockey ===
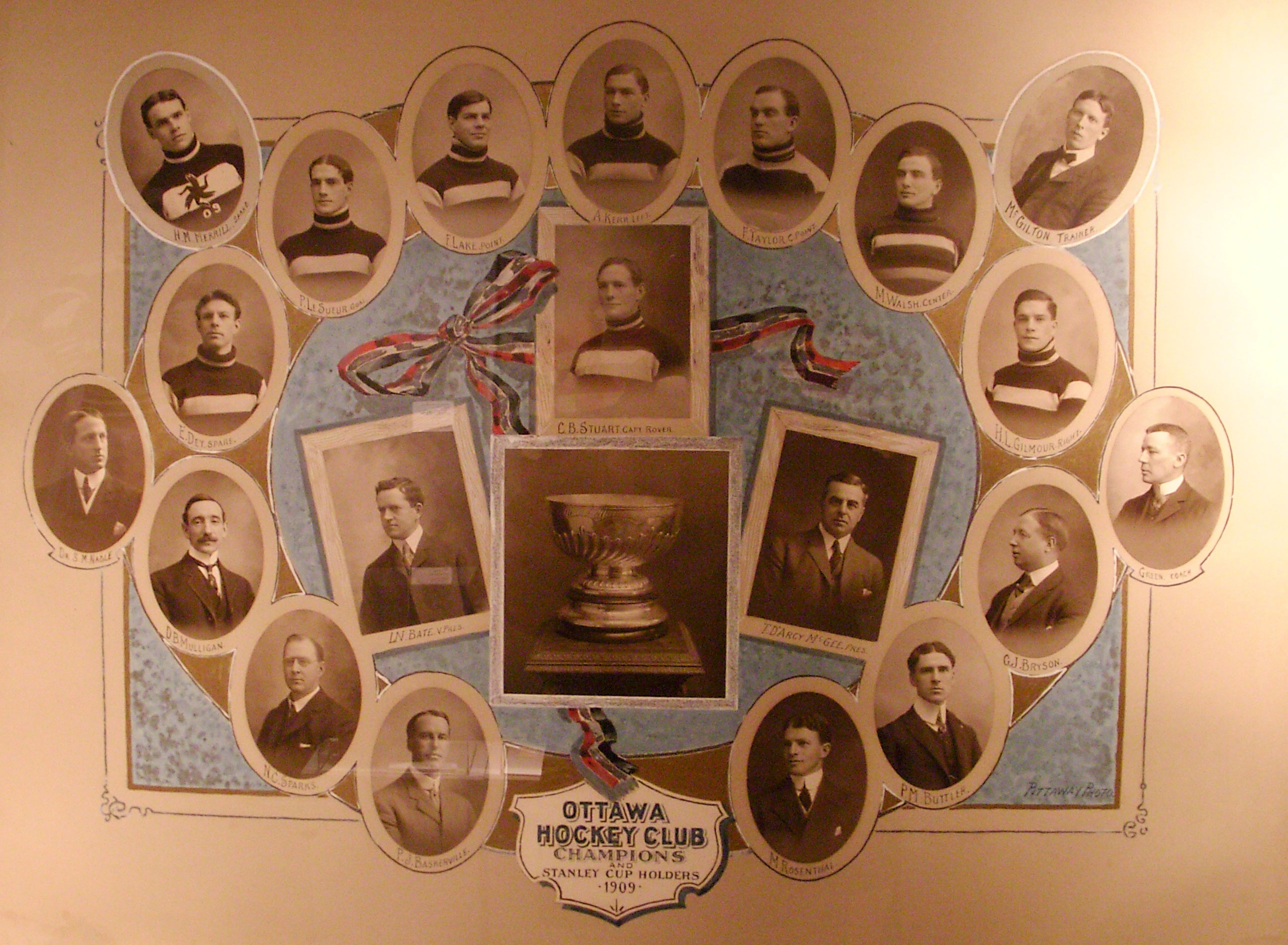
The Ottawa Hockey Club, Stanley Cup champions in 1909. David B. Mulligan, a member of the club's administration, is identified in the team photograph.

During his years in Ottawa, Mulligan was associated with the Russell House, one of the city's leading hotels. He was also active in organized sport, serving as vice-president, delegate, and chairman of the players' committee of the Ottawa Hockey Club.

He was part of the club's executive during a period in which Ottawa won Stanley Cup championships in 1909, 1910, and 1911.

== Railway hotels and Winnipeg years ==
From 1914 until December 1923, Mulligan served as superintendent of hotels for the Grand Trunk Pacific Railway, overseeing operations within its railway hotel organization.

During the transition to the Canadian National railway system in 1923, contemporary reporting described Mulligan as a general manager associated with the Canadian National railway system.

In this role, he held executive responsibility and oversaw a network of railway hotels across Canada including Fort Garry Hotel in Winnipeg, Hotel Macdonald in Edmonton and Château Laurier in Ottawa.

During this period, he was active as an amateur golfer and participated in competitions and inter-club matches.

== Windsor Hotel, Montreal and Waldorf-Astoria, New York ==
In 1924, Mulligan was appointed manager of the Windsor Hotel in Montreal. He subsequently became vice-president and managing director of the hotel and played a role in linking the hotel to a broader North American network of luxury hotels. During the mid-1920s, Mulligan also served as resident manager of the Waldorf-Astoria in New York City, while maintaining his association with the Windsor Hotel in Montreal.

By 1927, Mulligan's involvement with the Windsor had expanded beyond hotel management when he acquired an ownership interest in the property. During this period, he was also elected a vice-president of the American Hotel Association, reflecting his growing involvement in the hotel industry at the executive level. While Mulligan held both an executive role and an ownership interest in the Windsor, plans were announced for a major expansion of the property. The proposed development would have substantially increased the hotel's capacity.

He remained associated with the Windsor until resigning from his position in 1931.

== New York executive career ==
Following his departure from the Windsor Hotel in Montreal in 1931, Mulligan returned to New York City. In 1932, he joined the Bowman-Biltmore organization as vice-president and managing director and was placed in charge of the New York Biltmore Hotel. The appointment brought Mulligan into senior management of the hotel organization established by John McEntee Bowman, who had served as president of Bowman-Biltmore Hotels until his death in 1931.

Mulligan's appointment followed several decades of experience in the hotel industry in the United States and Canada. Earlier in his career, he had worked as a room clerk at the Holland House and the Waldorf-Astoria in New York before holding management and executive positions with the Russell House in Ottawa, the Grand Trunk Pacific Railway hotel system, and the Windsor Hotel in Montreal.

Both Mulligan and Bowman had worked at the Holland House during the early stages of their respective hotel careers. Bowman subsequently became president of Bowman-Biltmore Hotels, whose New York properties included the Biltmore and Hotel Commodore. Mulligan joined the organization in 1932, following Bowman's death the previous year.

In December 1934, Realty Hotels Inc. took over operation of the New York Biltmore, with Mulligan remaining in charge of the hotel's operations. By August 1940, Realty Hotels operated the Biltmore, Chatham and Park Lane hotels as part of a three-hotel grouping.Mulligan subsequently served as president and chairman of Realty Hotels Inc. He later became chairman of the board.

By the end of his career, Mulligan had also held leadership positions in several hotel-industry organizations, including serving as president of the New York City Hotel Association and the Canadian Hotel Association. In its 1954 obituary, The New York Times described him as the "dean of North American hotelmen".

== Civic and professional activities ==
In addition to his hotel management career, Mulligan held leadership positions in several professional and civic organizations. He served as president of the New York City Hotel Association and the Canadian Hotel Association and was a member of the American Hotel Association, the International Hotel Association, and the Hotel Association of the Province of Quebec.

Mulligan also served as a director of the New York Convention Bureau and as president and governor of the Fifth Avenue Association. His other affiliations included the Traffic Club of New York, the Hotel Greeters of America and the Friendly Sons of St. Patrick.

Mulligan was a trustee of St. Patrick's Cathedral and was a Knight of Malta.

== Golf and Association with the term "mulligan" ==
In 1935, Mulligan served on the Board of Governors of Winged Foot Golf Club.

Mulligan is associated with one of several published accounts concerning the origin of the golf term mulligan, referring to a replayed shot. Different accounts attribute the term to incidents involving Mulligan and his golfing companions.

M. Donald Grant, a cousin and golfing companion of Mulligan, provided a firsthand recollection of the practice. In a 1977 interview with The New York Times, Grant recalled playing golf with Mulligan and described an occasion on which Mulligan took an additional shot.

The account was discussed further in George Eberl's 1985 Golf Journal article, "Will the Real Mulligan Please Stand Up?" The article described Grant's recollections of golfing with Mulligan near Montreal in the late 1920s, including an incident involving an additional drive on the first hole. This account represents one of several explanations published about the origin of the term.

== Personal life ==
Mulligan was married twice. His first wife was Marie Zanone Hill, with whom he had one son, George B. Mulligan, born in 1906. She died shortly after the birth of their son.

In 1914, he married Jean Craig Mulligan in New York City. Their children included David B. Mulligan Jr., Deane Mulligan, and Jean Suzanne ("Suzy") Mulligan.

His daughter Suzy Mulligan was active in New York Cafe Society and worked as a performer at the Stork Club.

She married first American tennis champion Sidney Wood. She later married banking executive Leighton H. Coleman Jr.

Mulligan was related to Canadian hockey player Mike Grant Sr. and Wall Street financier M. Donald Grant.

== Death ==
Mulligan died in December, 1954, at the Hotel Barclay in New York City following a long illness."D. B. Mulligan, Was Hotel Official". Newsday. December 28, 1954. p. 92. At the time of his death, he was a retired chairman of the board of Realty Hotels Inc., the operator of the Biltmore, Barclay and Park Lane hotels.

His obituaries noted his long career in the hotel industry as well as his involvement in professional, civic and religious organizations. The New York Times reported that Mulligan had served as president of the New York City Hotel Association, president of the Canadian Hotel Association, a member of the American Hotel Association, a director of the New York Convention Bureau and president and governor of the Fifth Avenue Association. He was also identified as a trustee of St. Patrick's Cathedral and a Knight of Malta.

Mulligan was survived by his widow, Jean Craig Mulligan; two daughters, Mrs. Chris Matthews of Washington and Mrs. Sidney B. Wood Jr. of New York; and two sons, David B. Mulligan Jr. and George B. Mulligan.
