= Angus Duford =

Canadian ice hockey player

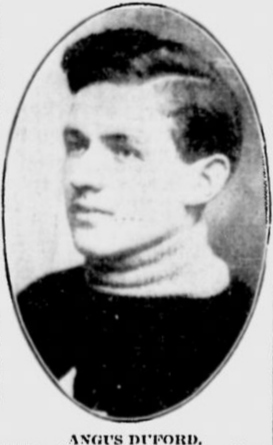
- Duford with Ottawa Stars lacrosse team
- Born: October 18, 1891 Gloucester, Ontario, Canada
- Died: May 21, 1950 (aged 58) Ottawa, Ontario, Canada
- Height: 5 ft 8 in (173 cm)
- Weight: 150 lb (68 kg; 10 st 10 lb)
- Position: Centre
- Shot: Right
- Played for: Ottawa Senators
- Playing career: 1910–1916

Angus Edmund Duford (October 18, 1891 – May 21, 1950) was a Canadian professional ice hockey player. Duford played at the center forward position for the Ottawa Senators of the National Hockey Association (NHA) in 1913–1916. Over three seasons in the NHA Duford scored 13 goals in 45 games. He was born in Hawthorne, Ontario.

Duford fought with the Canadian military in World War I and was dangerously injured by an exploding shell in Somme, France, in 1917. It left his right side paralyzed and disabled his speech, and he never played hockey again.

He died at his home in Ottawa, May 21, 1950.
