= Waterloo Colts =

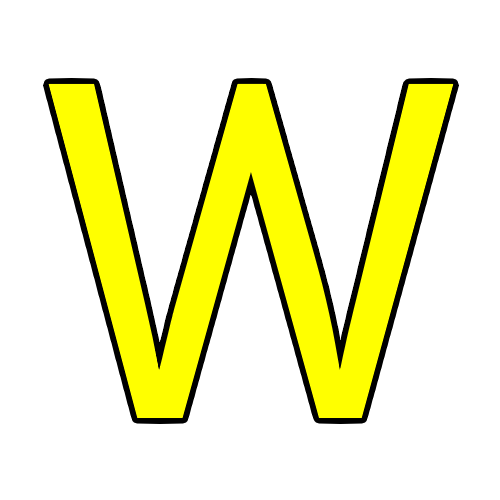
- City: Waterloo; Ontario; Canada
- League: OPHL
- Founded: 1910
- Operated: 1910-1911
- Home arena: Waterloo Skating Rink
- Colours: Black, yellow
- Head coach: Norman "Buck" Irving, 1910

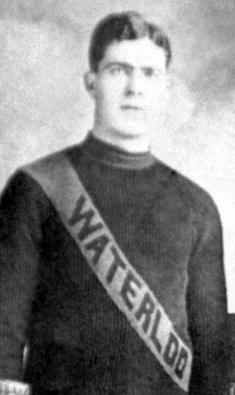
Hal McNamara with the Waterloo Colts.

The Waterloo Colts was a professional ice hockey team from Waterloo, Ontario in Canada. The team played for two seasons in the Ontario Professional Hockey League, from 1910 to 1911.

Waterloo Colts best result in its two-year tenure in the OPHL was a second-place finish in 1911, when the team lost the league title to the Galt Professionals. Waterloo lost the deciding game between the two teams 0-8 and missed out on a chance to challenge for the Stanley Cup.

== Notable players ==
Notable players who played for the Waterloo Colts were center Joe Malone and defenseman George McNamara, who both are inducted in the Hockey Hall of Fame.
