= Percy LeSueur =

Canadian ice hockey player (1881–1962)

- Hockey Hall of Fame, 1961
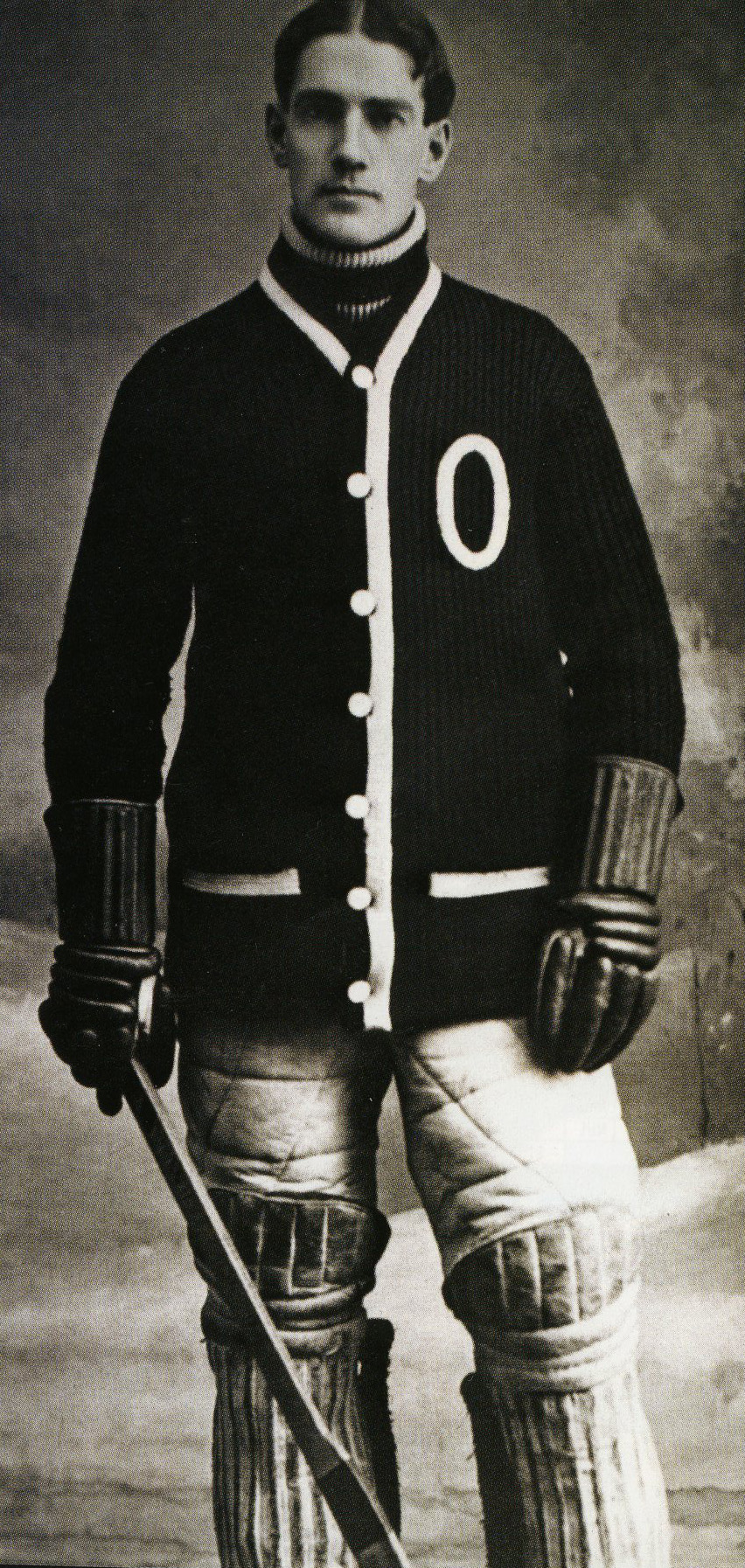
- LeSueur, 1910
- Born: November 21, 1881 Quebec City, Quebec, Canada
- Died: January 27, 1962 (aged 80) Hamilton, Ontario, Canada
- Height: 5 ft 7 in (170 cm)
- Weight: 150 lb (68 kg; 10 st 10 lb)
- Position: Goaltender
- Caught: Left
- Played for: Smiths Falls Seniors (OHA/FAHL); Ottawa Senators (ECAHA/CHA/NHA); Toronto Shamrocks (NHA); Toronto Blueshirts (NHA)
- Playing career: 1903–1916

Percivale St-Helier LeSueur (November 21, 1881 – January 27, 1962), known as "Peerless Percy", was a Canadian senior and professional ice hockey player and later involved in the game as referee, coach, manager and owner. A goaltender, he was a member of the Smiths Falls Seniors for three years, with whom his performance in a 1906 Stanley Cup challenge series attracted the attention of his opponents, the Ottawa Silver Seven. Although his team lost the series, LeSueur excelled in goal, keeping the games close. Nine days after the defeat, he joined the Silver Seven and played in a challenge match against the Montreal Wanderers. He remained with Ottawa through the 1913–14 season where he served as team captain for three seasons, and assumed coaching duties in his final season with the team.

LeSueur was traded to the Toronto Ontarios (who later changed their name to the Toronto Shamrocks mid-season) for the 1914–15 season. After playing the following season for the Toronto Blueshirts, he enlisted in the army and fought for Canada during the First World War. He returned to hockey following the conclusion of the war, serving in various roles including referee, coach, manager, arena manager, and hockey journalist. He coached ten games in the National Hockey League (NHL) with the Hamilton Tigers. As a journalist, he was the first reporter to include shots on goal statistics in game summaries.

During his playing career, LeSueur improved upon existing ice hockey equipment: he invented the gauntlet-style goaltender glove which protected the forearms, and created and patented the LeSueur net which was designed to catch high-rising shots. LeSueur was inducted into the Hockey Hall of Fame in 1961, and died a few months later following a lengthy illness.

== Playing career ==
=== Smiths Falls ===
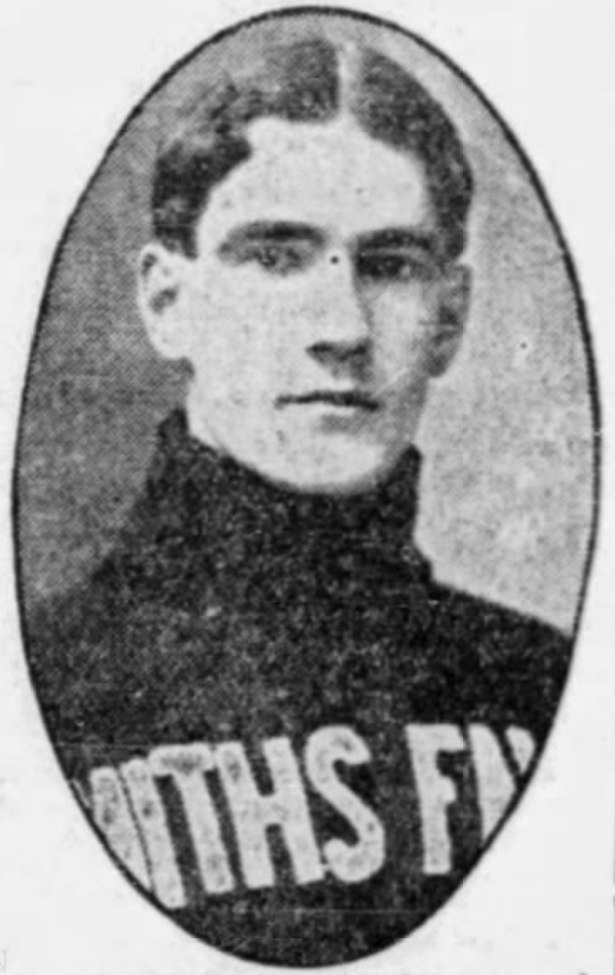
LeSueur with Smiths Falls

Born in Quebec City, Quebec, on November 21, 1881, Percy LeSueur played amateur hockey in his hometown with several teams on the right wing, among them the Quebec Crescents and the Quebec Seconds. He scored a regular season goal with the Quebec Hockey Club (known as the Bulldogs) in 1901. For the 1903–04 season, he moved to Smiths Falls, Ontario, to play for the Seniors in the Ontario Hockey Association (OHA). When the team's usual goaltender fell ill, LeSueur agreed to play goal.

In March 1906, the Smiths Falls Seniors, as a member of the Federal Amateur Hockey League (FAHL), issued a challenge for the Stanley Cup to the Ottawa Silver Seven (during that era, teams were allowed to challenge the present Cup holder once a year for possession, provided they were part of a senior hockey association and had won their league championship). In the two-game, total goals series, Smiths Falls lost the first game 6–5, and the second game 8–2. Both games were played at Dey's Arena in Ottawa, on March 6 and 8. Despite giving up 14 goals during the series, LeSueur's work in net was impressive: the Montreal Star remarked that his performance in the first game had kept the Seniors in contention, noting that the "most spectacular saves of the match were made by [him]".

=== Ottawa ===
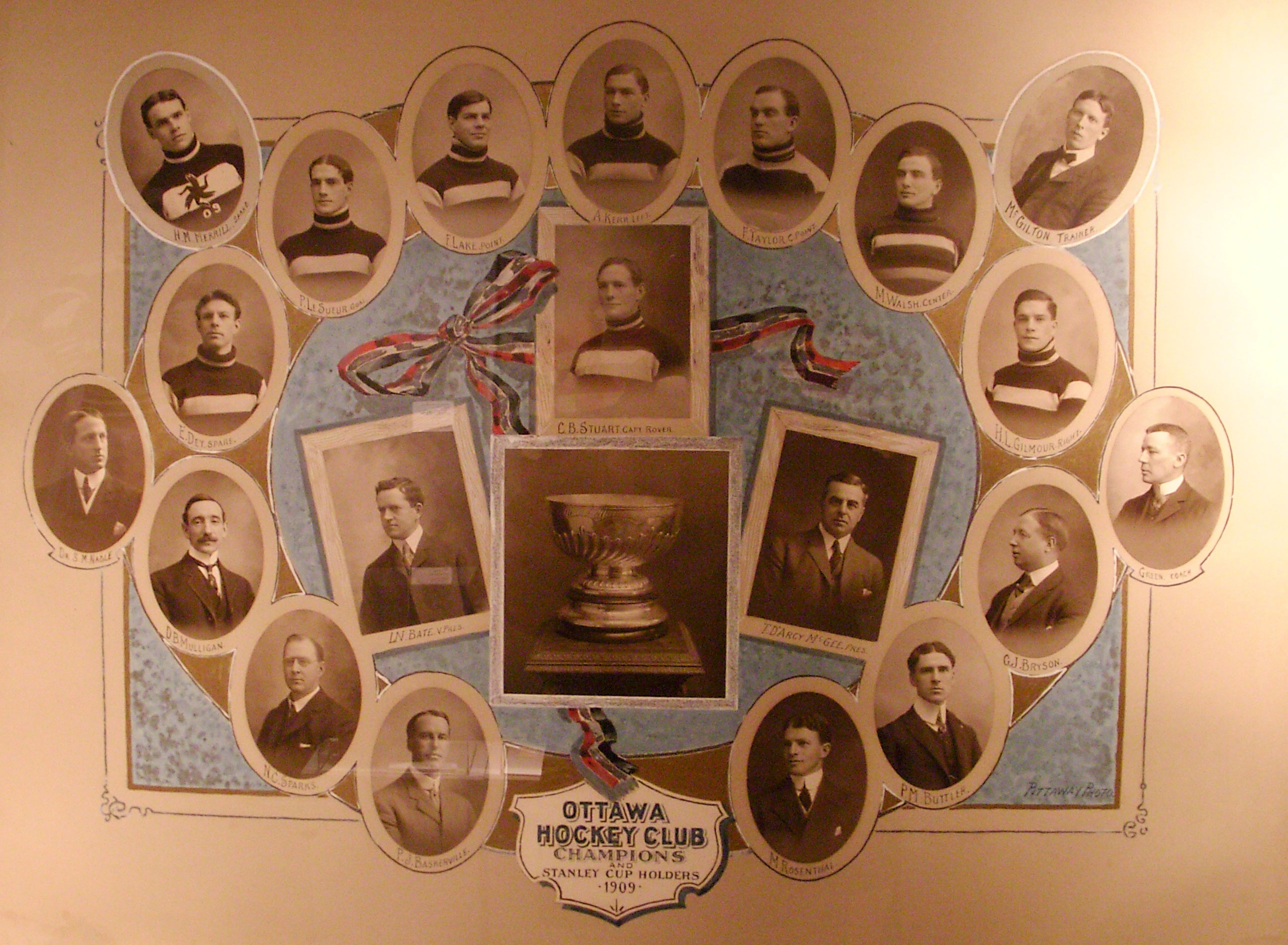
Ottawa Hockey Club, 1909 Stanley Cup champions; LeSueur is to the right and down from H.M. Merrill, top left.

Following Smith Falls's loss in the challenge match against Ottawa, LeSueur, a bank clerk, moved 60 kilometres northeast along the rail line to Ottawa (during his playing years, it was customary for players to have an occupation outside of hockey). Impressed by his performance, the Silver Seven asked him to join their team. Ottawa had lost confidence in its previous goalkeeper, Billy Hague, following a 9–1 defeat at the hands of the Montreal Wanderers in the first game of their two-game, total-goals Eastern Canada Amateur Hockey Association (ECAHA) playoff series for control of the Stanley Cup. The Silver Seven called the timing of LeSueur's arrival a coincidence, but with an eight-goal lead in the series, the Wanderers did not protest LeSueur's eligibility.

In the second game, played on March 17, LeSueur surrendered an early goal to Moose Johnson but subsequently held the Wanderers scoreless while the Silver Seven scored nine straight goals to bring the two teams even. Harry Smith appeared to put Ottawa ahead 11–10, but what would have been his seventh goal of the game was disallowed by an offside call. The Wanderers responded with a "furious attack", resulting in Lester Patrick scoring two late goals, leading Montreal to a 12–10 series victory and the Stanley Cup. LeSueur was the first goaltender, and one of only two (with Hugh Lehman, 1909–10) to play for two different teams in Stanley Cup challenges in the same season.

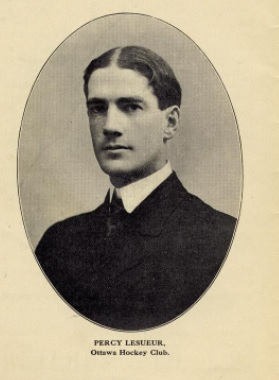
LeSueur circa 1909

LeSueur played for Ottawa through the 1913–14 season. He finished second in the Eastern Canada Amateur Hockey Association (ECAHA) in goals against average in his first season with Ottawa, giving up 54 in 10 games played. He repeated the feat in the 1907–08 season, with 51 goals against in 10 games. That season LeSueur was Ottawa's sole representative at the Hod Stuart Benefit All-Star Game, played on January 2. Stuart, a member of the Wanderers squad who won the Stanley Cup in 1907, had drowned in the previous off-season and the ECAHA responded by organizing an All-Star game, the first of its kind in any sport, with its proceeds going to Stuart's widow and their two children. The Wanderers defeated a team of All-Stars, made up of the top players of the league's other teams, 10–7. LeSueur remarked in the Ottawa Free Press that while joining the Silver Seven was his "biggest thrill", his participation in the All-Star Game came a "close second".

In the 1909 ECHA season, LeSueur won the Stanley Cup with Ottawa, now nicknamed the Senators, after the team led the league with 10 wins. During the same season, he wrote a 48-page booklet entitled How to Play Hockey, a work similar to Arthur Farrell's handbook Hockey: Canada's Royal Winter Game, the first book on ice hockey, which had appeared 10 years earlier. Published right before the start of the 1910–11 season, the book provided instructions on how to play every position, and contained photos of the star players of the era. LeSueur's book was particularly popular among youngsters.

LeSueur was named captain of the Senators for the 1910–11 season. The team led the regular season standings in the National Hockey Association (NHA) with 13 wins, regaining possession of the Stanley Cup. LeSueur was the league leader in goaltender wins in both the 1909 and 1910–11 seasons, having appeared in every game Ottawa played. During 1913–14, his last season with the Senators, LeSueur served as both the coach and captain of the team. He also led the NHA in goals against, though he only played 13 of the 20 games.

=== Toronto ===
LeSueur was traded to the Toronto Shamrocks for Fred Lake and $300, as the Ottawa club engaged Clint Benedict for its goaltender's job. At the time of the deal, LeSueur had been the last member of either the 1909 or 1911 Stanley Cup winning teams still in Ottawa. LeSueur helped the Shamrocks lower their goals against during the 1914–15 season, from 118 the previous season to 96 (more than one goal per game). However he still finished last among the six regular goalies that season in goals against. Coincidentally, LeSueur's last season with Ottawa also marked the end of the Stanley Cup challenge era. In Stanley Cup play, LeSueur had a 7–2 overall record and was undefeated in seven games with Ottawa.

After one season with the Shamrocks in 1914–15, LeSueur finished his playing career with the cross-town rival Toronto Blueshirts in 1915–16. He had a losing record with both Toronto clubs. LeSueur initially became a full-time practicing accountant after retiring as a player, but with the outbreak of the First World War in August 1914 enlisted with the 48th Highlanders, who served as the 134th Battalion of the Canadian Expeditionary Force. However he was redeployed to Divisional Headquarters to serve as a physical training and bayonet instructor. He was also recruited for the 228th Battalion, which fielded a team in the 1916–17 NHA season, and appeared in some team photos, but never played for them.

== Post-war ==
Following the war, LeSueur returned to hockey in a variety of roles. Over time, he appeared as a referee, coach, manager, arena manager, and journalist. His first job was as a referee in the National Hockey League (NHL). Afterwards, he coached in the minor leagues and the NHL. In 1921, he was behind the bench when the Galt, Ontario, intermediate team won the Ontario Hockey Association (OHA) championship. He was appointed the Hamilton Tigers' head coach for the 1923–24 NHL season, but coached only the first 10 games of the 24-game schedule. When LeSueur was fired, the team had a 3–7 record, and finished the season last in the standings with an overall record of 9–15.

LeSueur went on to manage several arenas and guided the creation of new teams. As manager of the Windsor Arena and the Detroit Olympia, he helped assemble an ownership group that acquired the Victoria Cougars from the Western Hockey League (WHL) prior to the 1926–27 season. The team joined the NHL as the Detroit Cougars, now known as the Red Wings. During 1928–29, he managed the Peace Bridge Arena in Fort Erie, Ontario. He guided the Buffalo Bisons' entry as an inaugural member of the International Hockey League (IHL) when it split from the Canadian Professional Hockey League (CPHL), and served as the team's coach. In 1930, LeSueur and partners purchased the Hamilton Tigers IHL franchise and moved it to Syracuse, New York. LeSueur served the new Syracuse Stars as head coach for the 1930–31 season, but replaced himself mid-season with Frank Foyston. LeSueur also managed the Syracuse Arena. While he was an IHL coach, he used his spare players during game intermissions to explain the rules of hockey to new spectators.

Following his coaching and managing career, LeSueur turned to journalism. He was a columnist for The Hamilton Spectator, and was the first reporter to list shots on goal in game summaries. In addition to writing, he was a radio broadcaster. He used this role to help sell the game in regions without an ice hockey tradition. In 1931, LeSueur was an original member of Hockey Night in Canada's "Hot Stove League", a panel of hockey writers which discussed issues within hockey during intermissions.

He was inducted into the Hockey Hall of Fame in 1961 as a player. In 1968, he was posthumously inducted as one of the 55 original members of the Ottawa Sports Hall of Fame.

== Playing style and innovations ==
He played with the alacrity of a tiger. He played with his hands, head, and feet. He never throws the puck away and in the tightest corners carries [it] to the back of his net and gives it to one of his forwards.

— Ottawa Free Press, 1907

During LeSueur's career, ice hockey rules forbade goalkeepers from lying, sitting, kneeling, or otherwise falling onto the ice to make a save. Forced to play a stand-up style, LeSueur was aggressive in goal and was sufficiently athletic to be able to stop two or three shots in quick succession. Hockey historian Bill Fitsell noted that he had an "intense roving style", playing the puck outside of his crease in a style popularized forty years later by Jacques Plante. His playing style was exemplified in a game against the Quebec Bulldogs, where LeSueur was reported to have sprinted towards and "floored" an opposing forward who was on a breakaway.

Described as a "thinking man's custodian", LeSueur is credited with two major innovations to ice hockey equipment. Around 1909, he experimented with using a baseball catcher's glove with extra padding to catch the puck. LeSueur later developed gauntlet-style gloves to protect the goaltender's forearms. He also designed the patented LeSueur net which was used from 1911 to 1925, first by the NHA and then its successor, the NHL. The net was designed to trap rising shots, with the rear frame 22 inches behind the goal mouth at the bottom of the net but only 17 inches at the top. Art Ross later improved on LeSueur's design, and his eponymous net was used by the NHL from 1927 to 1984.

== Personal life ==
LeSueur died on January 27, 1962, in Hamilton, Ontario, following a lengthy illness, a few months after his induction into the Hockey Hall of Fame. In a Canadian Press obituary, fellow Hall of Famer Newsy Lalonde described him as "one [of] the best goalies he ever faced", and Cyclone Taylor, a teammate on the 1909 Stanley Cup-winning Senators team, stated that LeSueur would always be in goal whenever "he was asked to pick an All-Star team".

Percy, a Presbyterian, was married to Georgia LeSueur. His son, Steve Douglas, followed his father into radio broadcasting. At the time of his father's death, Douglas was a Canadian Broadcasting Corporation (CBC) sports commentator. Through Steve, LeSueur had four grandchildren.

== Career statistics ==
=== Regular season and playoffs ===
			Regular season								Playoffs
Season	Team	League	GP	W	L	T	Min	GA	SO	GAA	GP	W	L	T	Min	GA	SO	GAA
1903–04	Smiths Falls Seniors	OHA Sr	6	3	3	0	370	13	2	2.11	—	—	—	—	—	—	—	—
1904–05	Smiths Falls Seniors	OHA Sr	—	—	—	—	—	—	—	—	—	—	—	—	—	—	—	—
1905–06	Smiths Falls Seniors	FAHL	7	7	0	0	420	16	1	2.29	—	—	—	—	—	—	—	—
1906	Smiths Falls Seniors	St-Cup	—	—	—	—	—	—	—	—	2	0	2	0	120	14	0	7.00
1906	Ottawa Senators	St-Cup	—	—	—	—	—	—	—	—	1	1	0	0	60	3	0	3.00
1906–07	Ottawa Senators	ECAHA	10	7	3	0	602	54	0	5.38	—	—	—	—	—	—	—	—
1907–08	Ottawa Senators	ECAHA	10	7	3	0	630	51	0	4.86	—	—	—	—	—	—	—	—
1908–09	Ottawa Senators	ECHA	12	10	2	0	728	63	0	5.19	—	—	—	—	—	—	—	—
1909–10	Ottawa Senators	CHA	2	2	0	0	120	9	0	4.50	—	—	—	—	—	—	—	—
1909–10	Ottawa Senators	NHA	12	9	3	0	730	66	0	5.42	—	—	—	—	—	—	—	—
1910	Ottawa Senators	St-Cup	—	—	—	—	—	—	—	—	4	4	0	0	240	15	0	3.75
1910–11	Ottawa Senators	NHA	16	13	3	0	990	69	1	4.18	—	—	—	—	—	—	—	—
1911	Ottawa Senators	St-Cup	—	—	—	—	—	—	—	—	2	2	0	0	120	8	0	4.00
1911–12	Ottawa Senators	NHA	18	9	9	0	1126	91	0	4.84	—	—	—	—	—	—	—	—
1912–13	Ottawa Senators	NHA	18	7	10	0	934	65	0	4.18	—	—	—	—	—	—	—	—
1913–14	Ottawa Senators	NHA	13	6	6	0	773	42	1	3.26	—	—	—	—	—	—	—	—
1914–15	Toronto Shamrocks	NHA	19	8	11	0	1145	96	0	5.03	—	—	—	—	—	—	—	—
1915–16	Toronto Blueshirts	NHA	23	9	13	0	1416	92	1	3.90	—	—	—	—	—	—	—	—
ECAHA/ECHA totals			32	24	8	0	1960	168	0	5.14	—	—	—	—	—	—	—	—
NHA totals			119	61	55	0	7114	521	3	4.39	—	—	—	—	—	—	—	—
St-Cup totals			—	—	—	—	—	—	—	—	9	7	2	0	540	40	0	4.44

=== Coaching record ===
			Regular season					Playoffs
Season	Team	League	GC	W	L	T	Finish	GC	W	L	T	Result
1923–24	Hamilton Tigers	NHL	10	3	7	0	—	—	—	—	—	—
NHL totals			10	3	7	0	—	—	—	—	—	—

== Bibliography ==
- Allen, Kevin; Duff, Bob; Bower, Johnny (2002), Without Fear: Hockey's 50 Greatest Goaltenders, Chicago: Triumph Books, ISBN 978-1-57243-484-4
- Attestation Paper (Percy LeSueur; back), Library and Archives Canada, archived from the original on October 23, 2012
- Attestation Paper (Percy LeSueur; front), Library and Archives Canada, archived from the original on October 23, 2012
- Coleman, Charles L. (1964), The Trail of the Stanley Cup, Volume 1: 1893–1926 inc., Dubuque, Iowa: Kendall/Hunt Publishing, OCLC 957132
- Cosentino, Frank (1990), The Renfrew Millionaires: The Valley Boys of Winter 1910, Burnstown, Ontario: General Store Publishing House, ISBN 978-0-919431-35-5
- Duplacey, James; Diamond, Dan (2000), The Official Rules of Hockey, Guilford, Connecticut: Globe Pequot, ISBN 1-58574-052-7
- Duplacey, James; Zweig, Eric (2010), Official Guide to the Players of the Hockey Hall of Fame, Firefly Books, ISBN 978-1-55407-662-8
- "Game's Greats Pay Tribute To Late Goalie Percy LeSueur", Edmonton Journal, Edmonton, Alberta, The Canadian Press, January 30, 1962
- "Hall of Fame Member Was Silver Seven Star: Percy LeSueur", The Globe and Mail, New York City, January 29, 1962, ProQuest 1284837027
- "Hall of Famer Percy LeSueur Dies At Age 79", Ottawa Citizen, Ottawa, Ontario, The Canadian Press, January 27, 1962
- Holzman, Morey; Nieforth, Joseph (2002), Deceptions and Doublecross: How the NHL Conquered Hockey, Toronto: Dundurn Press, ISBN 1-55002-413-2
- Hughes, Morgan; Fischler, Stan and Shirley; Romain, Joseph; Duplacey, James (2003), Hockey Chronicle: Year-by-Year History of the National Hockey League, Lincolnwood, Illinois: Publications International, Ltd., ISBN 0-7853-9624-1
- Kitchen, Paul (2008), Win, Tie, or Wrangle: The Inside Story of the Old Ottawa Senators, 1883–1935, Manotic, Ontario: Penumbra Press, ISBN 978-1-897323-46-5
- "LeSueur is 'Safe'; Missing Radio Announcer Writes Father From Jersey City", The New York Times, New York City, December 25, 1937
- MacLeod, Alan Livingstone (2018), From Rinks to Regiments: Hockey Hall-of-Famers and the Great War, Victoria, British Columbia: Heritage House, ISBN 978-1-77203-268-0
- Mancuso, Jim (2005), Hockey in Syracuse, Charleston, South Carolina: Arcadia Publishing, ISBN 978-0-7385-3898-3
- "Ottawa Hall of Fame opens Thursday with honor roll of 55", Ottawa Citizen, New York City, April 27, 1968
- Percy LeSueur Biography, Hockey Hall of Fame
- Podnieks, Andrew (2000), The NHL All-Star Game: Fifty Years of the Great Tradition, Toronto: HarperCollins, ISBN 0-00-200058-X
- Soldiers of the First World War, Library and Archives Canada, archived from the original on October 23, 2012
- "Steve Douglas Broadcaster began in '30", The Globe and Mail, New York City, October 10, 1981, ProQuest 386753013
- Weekes, Don (2009), The Biggest Book of Hockey Trivia, Vancouver: Greystone Books, ISBN 978-1-55365-456-8

Sporting positions
Preceded by Marty Walsh	Ottawa Senators captain (Original Era); 1912–13	Succeeded by Jack Darragh
Preceded by Ken Randall	Head coach of the Hamilton Tigers; 1924	Succeeded by Jimmy Gardner
