= Marty Walsh (ice hockey, born 1884) =

Canadian ice hockey player (1884–1915)

- Hockey Hall of Fame, 1963
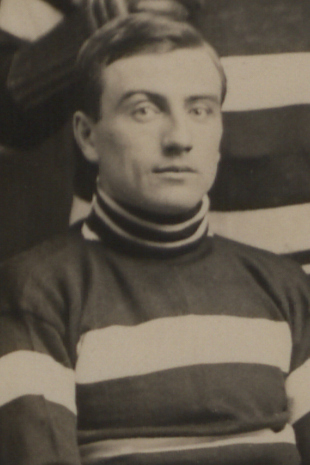
- Walsh in 1911
- Born: October 16, 1884 Kingston, Ontario, Canada
- Died: March 27, 1915 (aged 30) Muskoka, Ontario, Canada
- Height: 5 ft 7 in (170 cm)
- Weight: 155 lb (70 kg; 11 st 1 lb)
- Position: Centre
- Played for: Ottawa Senators
- Playing career: 1906–1912

Martin Joseph Walsh (October 16, 1884 – March 27, 1915) was a Canadian amateur, later professional, ice hockey player. Walsh played for the Ottawa Senators, winning three Stanley Cups in 1909, 1910 and 1911 and is a member of the Hockey Hall of Fame. He retired from ice hockey in 1912 and moved west to Edmonton to work. In 1914, Walsh contracted tuberculosis, succumbing to the disease in March 1915.

== Early life ==
Walsh was born in Kingston, Ontario, the son of Michael and Catherine Walsh. Martin had an older sister Loretta and an older brother William. Walsh played junior hockey for the local Kingston Frontenacs. At seventeen, Walsh entered Queen's University.

Walsh played hockey for the Queen's senior hockey team from 1902 to 1906, where he was a teammate of George Richardson, and the team won the intercollegiate title in 1904 and 1906. The 1906 squad challenged for the Stanley Cup in 1906 against the Ottawa Senators. Walsh scored four goals in the two games of the series which was won by Ottawa. Walsh also played rugby football for Queen's, and was a member of their 1905 intercollegiate championship team.

== Professional career ==
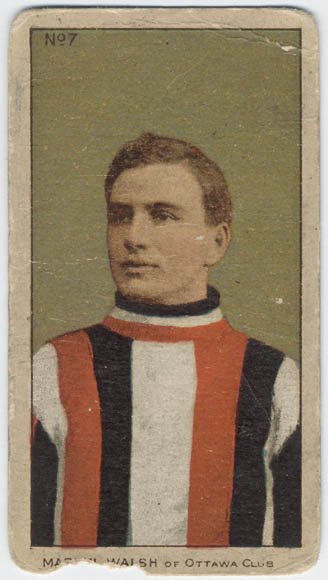
Marty Walsh on a 1910 tobacco card.

Walsh turned professional for the 1906–07 season with the Canadian Soo of the International Professional Hockey League (IPHL), playing only seven games due to a fractured left ankle.

Walsh was sought after by several clubs, including the Montreal Shamrocks and Montreal Wanderers, but he decided to sign with Ottawa. He joined the Ottawa Hockey Club in 1907 and played for the club for five seasons, winning Stanley Cups in 1909, 1910 and 1911. He was a high-scoring forward and in 1909, Marty scored 42 goals in 12 games, and in his career playoffs, he averaged over three points per game, an extraordinary feat.

When the National Hockey Association was formed late in 1909, Renfrew attempted to sign Ottawa's star players including Walsh, but Walsh re-signed with Ottawa. When Walsh re-signed with Ottawa, players Fred Lake and Albert Kerr decided to turn down their Renfrew offers. Commenting on the financial aspects of the game in December 1909, Walsh stated that even though some player salaries could seem high-priced from an outside perspective, the game did not come without a sacrificial price of its own in the form of injuries:

"Over $200 a week for hockey, that seems easy money, but I can tell you when a man draws that amount he pretty nearly earns every cent of it. Take myself for instance. I have only played "pro" hockey for a comparatively short time, yet I have taken some bumps that it takes lots of money to equalize. My first year out I was handed a broken ankle at the Soo, which laid me on my back for about six weeks. That was worth something. Then in New York last year I came out of the game with a face that looked like the results of an encounter with wildcats. I've had all my front teeth knocked out, and it costs money to get new ones."

— Marty Walsh on money and injuries in hockey.

In 1911, Walsh scored ten goals in a Stanley Cup challenge match against Port Arthur, second only to Frank McGee's 14 in one game. After the 1911 season, Bruce Stuart retired and Walsh was named captain of the team. Walsh played his last professional game with the Senators in 1912, finishing with 11 goals in 12 games for the 1911–12 season.

Walsh was recognized for his talent in 1962 when he was inducted into the Hockey Hall of Fame.

== Playing style ==
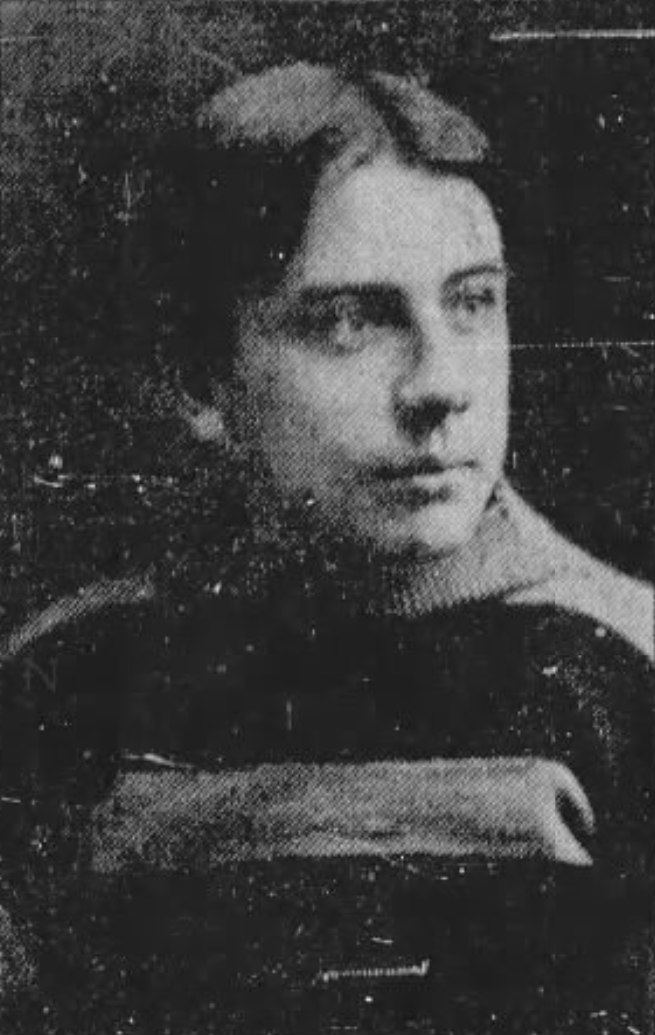
Walsh with Queen's University team.

"Two minutes later Walsh was again wedged within two feet of Vezina, batting and slashing at everything that came his way. Suddenly the puck slid out from Darragh's stick, caromed against Walsh and plunked in the twine behind the French goalkeeper, thus winning for Ottawa the hardest match fought in Ottawa for many seasons."

— Ottawa Citizen describing a Marty Walsh goal from January 21, 1911 against the Montreal Canadiens.

Like many other centre forwards during the earlier years of professional hockey, Marty Walsh had his strongest suit in close proximity to the opponent net, where he would often park himself for redirections or deflections. The Ottawa Citizen, in its January 26, 1911 issue, described a goal against the Montreal Canadiens on January 21 during the 1910–11 NHA season, where Walsh had positioned himself right in front of Georges Vézina for the game-winning goal in overtime, and the puck had caromed off of Walsh and into the net after first having left teammate Jack Darragh's stick. The newspaper pointed out that that was how Walsh got most of his goals, and that he usually wasn't a "showy" player.

The Ottawa Citizen from January 26, 1911, also pointed out that while Walsh couldn't skate like Cyclone Taylor, wasn't blessed with the beautiful foot work of Albert Kerr, and didn't show as spectacular as Bruce Ridpath, his absence was still dearly felt for the Ottawas when he was off the ice, and exemplified the claim with a 5-minute slashing penalty on Walsh during the January 21 game against the Montreal Canadiens, by which "the Ottawa defence was demoralized, their attack seemed to melt to pieces, and before the Kingstonian's penalty had expired Canadiens had tied the score."

Walsh's hovering around the opponent net earned him the nickname "Stick-around" Walsh from famous Montreal Victorias player Russell Bowie, but the January 26, 1911 issue of the Ottawa Citizen also claimed that "Marty's checking back has re[s]cued the Ottawa defence from many a perilous position this winter. He is always there with the poke and jab when the rubber is dangerously near the peerless LeSueur."

== Post-career ==
In 1912, Walsh left for Winnipeg with Dubbie Kerr to start a cattle ranch. Their plans changed when Kerr was lured out of retirement to play in the new Pacific Coast Hockey Association (PCHA). There were reports that the PCHA had signed Walsh as well, but he remained retired. In 1913, Walsh moved west to the Edmonton area, where he worked as a paymaster for the Grand Trunk Railway. While in Edmonton, he coached the Edmonton Eskimos team for two seasons. He guided the Eskimos to the 1913 Inter-City Hockey League title and an Allan Cup challenge.

In 1914, Walsh fell ill with tuberculosis. In February 1915, Walsh entered the Gravenhurst Sanitorium for treatment, but when admitted, the doctors estimated he had only a short time left to live. Walsh died on March 27, 1915. His remains were transported to Kingston for burial in St. Mary's Cemetery after a funeral at St. Mary's Cathedral. At his death, Walsh's only relative was his sister Loretta Keaney of Sudbury.

== Awards ==
- 1908, 1909 – ECAHA/ECHA First All-Star team
- 1909 – ECHA Most Valuable Player

== Statistics ==
			Regular season					Playoffs
Season	Team	League	GP	G	A	Pts	PIM	GP	G	A	Pts	PIM
1903–04	Queen's University	CIHU	4	9	0	9	30	—	—	—	—	—
1904–05	Queen's University	CIHU	4	9	0	9	15	—	—	—	—	—
1905–06	Queen's University	St-Cup	—	—	—	—	—	2	4	0	4	3
1906–07	Canadian Soo	IHL	7	4	5	9	0	—	—	—	—	—
1907–08	Ottawa Senators	ECAHA	9	27	0	27	30	—	—	—	—	—
1908–09	Ottawa Senators	ECHA	12	42	0	42	41	—	—	—	—	—
1909–10	Ottawa Senators	CHA	2	9	0	9	18	—	—	—	—	—
1909–10	Ottawa Senators	St-Cup	—	—	—	—	—	4	8	0	8	12
1909–10	Ottawa Senators	NHA	11	19	0	19	44	—	—	—	—	—
1910–11	Ottawa Senators	NHA	16	35	0	35	51	—	—	—	—	—
1910–11	Ottawa Senators	St-Cup	—	—	—	—	—	2	13	0	13	0
1911–12	Ottawa Senators	NHA	12	9	0	9	0	—	—	—	—	—
ECAHA/ECHA totals			21	69	0	69	71	—	—	—	—	—
NHA totals			39	63	0	63	95	—	—	—	—	—
St-Cup totals			—	—	—	—	—	8	25	0	25	15

Preceded by Bruce Stuart	Ottawa Senators captain (Original Era); 1911–12	Succeeded by Percy LeSueur
