= 1914–15 NHA season =

National Hockey Association season

- League: National Hockey Association
- Sport: Ice hockey
- Duration: December 26, 1914 – March 13, 1915
- Games: 20
- Teams: 6

Regular season
- Top scorer: Tommy Smith (40)

O'Brien Cup
- Champions: Ottawa Senators
- Runners-up: Montreal Wanderers

NHA seasons
- ← 1913–14 1915–16 →

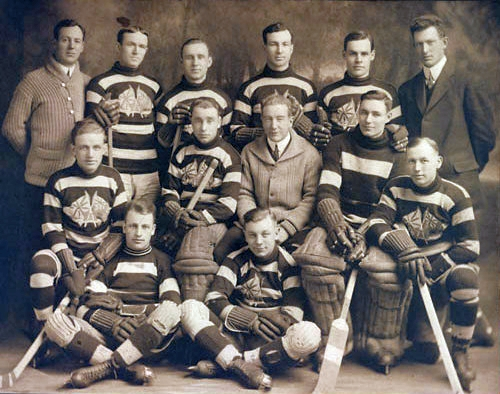
Portrait of the Ottawa Senators

The 1914–15 NHA season was the sixth season of the National Hockey Association and played from December 26, 1914, until March 3, 1915. Each team played 20 games. The Ottawa Senators won the NHA championship in a two-game, total goal playoff against the Montreal Wanderers. The Senators, however fell to the Vancouver Millionaires of the Pacific Coast Hockey Association in the Stanley Cup championship. It was the second 'World's Series' between the NHA and the PCHA for the Stanley Cup.

== League business ==
=== Directors ===
- Emmett Quinn, president
- Frank Calder, secretary-treasurer

=== Rule changes ===
At a meeting on March 30, 1914, held with the PCHA executives, the league decided:

- adopt the lines separating the three zones for off-side purposes
- to continue in six-man hockey, while the PCHA will continue in seven-man hockey
- to drop fines in general for infractions and use minutes off
- no player to come within five feet of players facing off
- no face-offs closer than 10 feet from the goaltender
- puck played after rebounding from goalkeeper no longer is offside

Source: Toronto Globe

At the November meeting of the league, the NHA decided:

- charging a player into the boards is a major foul,
- match foul penalized by 10 minutes off and $15 fine.

=== Pre-season ===
Along with Montreal Nationals president A. L. Caron, player Art Ross attempted to organize a new hockey league with teams in Ottawa, Montreal, Toronto and Boston. The arena owners in all of the cities turned down the new league and killed the idea. Ross was suspended by the NHA, but by January 7, Mr. Ross was reinstated. He signed with Ottawa.

== Regular season ==
The Ontarios changed their team name to Shamrocks from the February 3 game forward.

Ottawa traded Percy LeSueur to the Ontarios for Fred Lake.

=== Highlights ===
A record long overtime game was played in Quebec on January 13 between Quebec and the Canadiens. Quebec defeated Montreal 3–2 after 50 minutes and 28 seconds of overtime, on a goal by Jack McDonald. Coach Jack Laviolette had to take over for Georges Vezina after Vezina was penalized.

The Ontarios had to forfeit their February 3 game with the Wanderers after the McNamara brothers took a personal leave to attend their fathers' funeral. Owner Eddie Livingstone of the Ontarios asked for a postponement but the Wanderers refused.

A game on February 17 between Toronto and Ottawa turned into a brawl before Toronto police arrested Art Ross and Roy McGiffen to calm the proceedings.

=== Final standings ===
National Hockey Association
	GP	W	L	T	GF	GA
Ottawa Senators	20	14	6	0	74	65
Montreal Wanderers	20	14	6	0	127	82
Quebec Bulldogs	20	11	9	0	85	85
Toronto Hockey Club	20	8	12	0	66	84
Toronto Ontarios-Shamrocks	20	7	13	0	76	96
Montreal Canadiens	20	6	14	0	65	81

Note: W = Wins, L = Losses, T = Ties, GF= Goals For, GA = Goals Against

=== Results ===
Month	Day	Visitor	Score	Home	Score
Dec.	26	Ottawa	4	Quebec	1
Dec.	26	Wanderers	11	Ontarios	6
Dec.	26	Toronto	4	Canadiens	3
Dec.	30	Ontarios	1	Ottawa	4
Dec.	30	Wanderers	5	Toronto	2
Dec.	30	Quebec	8	Canadiens	7
Jan.	2	Ottawa	6	Wanderers	15
Jan.	2	Canadiens	1	Ontarios	4
Jan.	2	Toronto	2	Quebec	6
Jan.	6	Ottawa	4	Canadiens	2
Jan.	6	Ontarios	3	Toronto	4
Jan.	6	Wanderers	5	Quebec	6
Jan.	9	Toronto	1	Ottawa	2 (OT 18")
Jan.	9	Quebec	2	Ontarios	3 (OT 5')
Jan.	9	Canadiens	4	Wanderers	5 (OT 6'45")
Jan.	13	Ottawa	3	Ontarios	5
Jan.	13	Toronto	3	Wanderers	11
Jan.	13	Canadiens	3	Quebec	4 (OT 50'20")
Jan.	16	Wanderers	3	Ottawa	4
Jan.	16	Quebec	1	Toronto	3
Jan.	16	Ontarios	7	Canadiens	1
Jan.	20	Canadiens	1	Ottawa	3
Jan.	20	Toronto	4	Ontarios	3
Jan.	20	Quebec	2	Wanderers	5
Jan.	23	Canadiens	7	Wanderers	2
Jan.	23	Ontarios	1	Quebec	4
Jan.	23	Ottawa	2	Toronto	4
Jan.	27	Quebec	2	Ottawa	7
Jan.	27	Canadiens	1	Toronto	2
Jan.	27	Ontari	4	Wanderers	14
Jan.	30	Ottawa	3	Quebec	1
Jan.	30	Wanderers	2	Toronto	8
Jan.	30	Ontarios	3	Canadiens	4
Feb.	3	Toronto	2	Ottawa	7
Feb.	3	Wanderers		Ontarios	†
Feb.	3	Quebec	2	Canadiens	5
Feb.	6	Ottawa	1	Wanderers	8
Feb.	6	Ontarios	5	Quebec	9
Feb.	6	Canadiens	4	Toronto	3
Feb.	10	Ottawa	6	Ontarios	2
Feb.	10	Toronto	5	Quebec	7
Feb.	10	Canadiens	3	Wanderers	6
Feb.	13	Canadiens	3	Ottawa	5
Feb.	13	Quebec	6	Wanderers	4
Feb.	13	Toronto	3	Ontarios	6
Feb.	17	Ottawa	3	Toronto	1
Feb.	17	Ontarios	7	Wanderers	10
Feb.	17	Canadiens	2	Quebec	6
Feb.	20	Wanderers	5	Ottawa	1
Feb.	20	Toronto	2	Canadiens	7
Feb.	20	Quebec	6	Ontarios	10
Feb.	24	Ottawa	2	Canadiens	3
Feb.	24	Wanderers	4	Quebec	5 (OT 2')
Feb.	24	Ontarios	1	Toronto	5
Feb.	27	Ontarios	2	Ottawa	3
Feb.	27	Quebec	5	Toronto	4
Feb.	27	Wanderers	7	Canadiens	3
Mar.	3	Quebec	3	Ottawa	4 (OT 25")
Mar.	3	Toronto	4	Wanderers	5
Mar.	3	Canadiens	2	Ontarios	3

† Defaulted to Wanderers.

Source: Coleman, pp. 272–273.

== Player statistics ==
=== Scoring leaders ===
Note: GP = Games played, G = Goals scored, A = Assists, Pts = Points, PIM = Penalties in minutes

Name	Club	GP	G	A	Pts	PIM
Tommy Smith	Toronto Shamrocks; Quebec Bulldogs	19	40	4	44	43
Didier Pitre	Montreal Canadiens	20	30	4	34	15
Gordon Roberts	Montreal Wanderers	19	29	5	34	74
Sprague Cleghorn	Montreal Wanderers	19	21	12	33	51
Harry Hyland	Montreal Wanderers	19	23	6	29	49
Punch Broadbent	Ottawa Senators	20	24	3	27	115
Cully Wilson	Toronto Blueshirts	20	22	5	27	138
Odie Cleghorn	Montreal Wanderers	15	21	5	26	39
Rusty Crawford	Quebec Bulldogs	20	18	8	26	30
Skene Ronan	Toronto Shamrocks	18	21	4	25	55

=== Goaltending averages ===
Note: GP = Games played, GA = Goals against, SO = Shutouts, GAA = Goals against average

Name	Club	GP	GA	SO	GAA
Clint Benedict	Ottawa	20	65		3.3
Georges Vezina	Canadiens	20	81		4.1
Harry Holmes	Toronto	20	84		4.2
Paddy Moran	Quebec	20	85		4.3
Charlie McCarthy	Wanderers	19	82		4.3
Percy LeSueur	Ontarios-Shamrocks	19	96		5.1
Art Boyce	Wanderers	2	6		7.20

== Playoffs ==
=== League championship ===
Montreal and Ottawa played a two-game total-goals series to determine the league championship. In the first game, Ottawa's Art Ross scored in the first period to give the Senators the lead which they would not relinquish. In the second, Angus Duford scored to push the lead to 2–0 after two periods, and Horace Merrill and Jack Darragh scored to make it 4–0. In the second game, the Wanderers' Donald Smith scored in the second period, but the Senators held the Wanderers off with tight checking to win the series 4–1 on goals.

Date	Winning Team	Score	Losing Team	Location
March 10	Ottawa Senators	4–0	Montreal Wanderers	The Arena, Ottawa
March 13	Montreal Wanderers	1–0	Ottawa Senators	Montreal Arena, Montreal
Senators win series 4–1.

For the win, Ottawa was awarded the O'Brien Cup. Since the NHA champion of 1914 was the defending champion of the Stanley Cup, Ottawa now took possession and defence of the Stanley Cup as well. The Senators engraved their series win over the Wanderers on the Stanley Cup and travelled to Vancouver for the world championship series against the Vancouver Millionaires.

=== Exhibition series ===
The Wanderers, Canadiens and Bulldogs played an exhibition series in New York and Boston. The Ontarios and Torontos played an exhibitions series in Cleveland, Ohio.

=== Stanley Cup Final ===
As the 1914 Final was held in Toronto, all three games in this series were played at the arena of the PCHA's champion in Vancouver, British Columbia. The Millionaires swept the best-of-five series in three games.

Date	Winning Team	Score	Losing Team	Rules Used	Location
March 22	Vancouver Millionaires	6–2	Ottawa Senators	PCHA	Denman Arena, Vancouver
March 24	Vancouver Millionaires	8–3	Ottawa Senators	NHA	Denman Arena, Vancouver
March 26	Vancouver Millionaires	12–3	Ottawa Senators	PCHA	Denman Arena, Vancouver
Millionaires win best-of-five series 3 games to 0

== Awards ==
- O'Brien Cup - Ottawa Senators

== See also ==
- 1914–15 PCHA season
- National Hockey Association
- List of pre-NHL seasons
- List of Stanley Cup champions

Preceded by 1913–14 NHA season	NHA seasons 1914–15	Succeeded by 1915–16 NHA season
