= Toronto Ontarios =

- City: Toronto, Ontario
- League: National Hockey Association
- Founded: 1912
- Operated: 1912–1915
- Home arena: Arena Gardens
- Colours: Orange and Green
- Owners: Tom Wall (1913–14); Eddie Livingstone (1914–15)
- Head coach: Jimmy Murphy

The Toronto Ontarios were a professional men's ice hockey team in the National Hockey Association from 1912 to 1915 based in Toronto, Ontario, Canada. They were first named the Tecumseh Hockey Club, renamed the Ontarios in 1913 and renamed the Toronto Shamrocks in January 1915 and ceased operations later that year.

== Tecumsehs ==
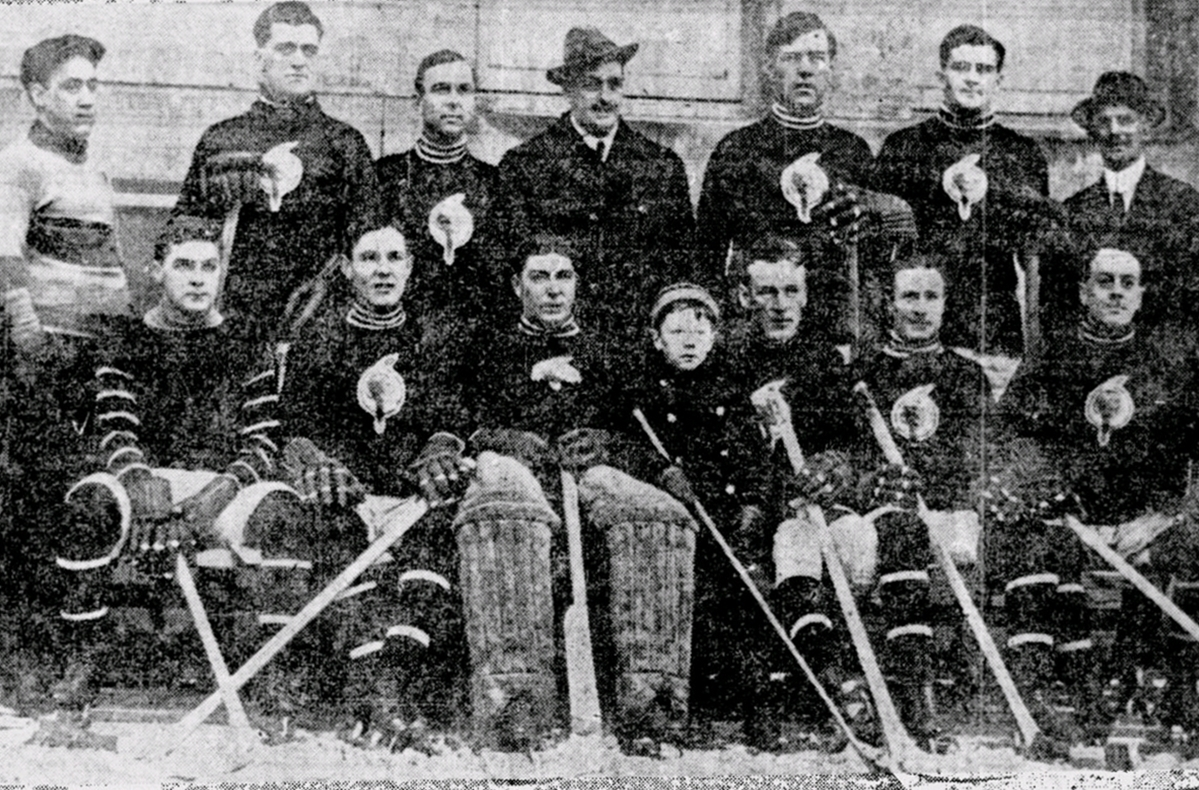
First team picture of the Tecumsehs team. Standing (left to right): Tom Daly (trainer), George McNamara, Horace Gaul, Cap Williams, Con Corbeau, Howard McNamara, Billie Pop. Sitting: Alex Nicholson, Teddy Oke, Billy Nicholson (manager), the mascot, Art Throop, Fred Strike, Ernie Liffiton.

The NHA was founded in 1909 without any teams from Toronto, Ontario because there wasn't an arena in the city that was large enough to sustain a franchise. In 1911, a new arena was being built in Toronto and a franchise was awarded to the Toronto Hockey Club, and a group affiliated with the Tecumseh Lacrosse Club applied for a second franchise. The Tecumsehs bought a franchise from Ambrose O'Brien, paying $500 cash and promissory notes for $2,000.

The Tecumsehs were put on the NHA schedule for the 1911–12 season with no home games scheduled until late in January, when the arena was expected to be completed. Because of construction delays, it soon became clear that the arena would not be ready in time, and both Toronto teams were removed from the schedule, leaving the NHA with only four teams for the season.

Before the 1912–13 season started, O'Brien said that he never received the balance of the franchise fee from the Tecumseh backers, so he re-sold the franchise to a group headed by William James "Billy" Bellingham from Montreal, a former defenceman of the Montreal Victorias. Goaltender Billy Nicholson, formerly with Montreal HC, was appointed player-manager-captain. The team he put together included future hall-of-famer George McNamara and his brother, Howard McNamara. Teddy Oke, who would go on to be one of the founders of the Canadian Professional Hockey League in 1926, was also on the team.

They played their first game on December 28, 1912 against the Montreal Wanderers at the arena, which would soon become known as Arena Gardens. The visiting Wanderers won 7–4 in front of 5,000 fans. Paid attendance of 4,339 and gate receipts of $3,040 both set short-lived Toronto hockey records. The Tecumsehs got off to a good start, but at the end of the season were in last place in the six-team NHA in with seven wins and 13 losses.

== Ontarios ==
In 1913, Tom Wall purchased the bankrupt Tecumsehs and renamed them the Ontarios. The team continued to play in the Arena Gardens. The Tecumsehs had finished sixth in the six-team league, with a record of seven wins and 13 losses. Despite the addition of 27-goal scorer Jack McDonald and veteran Ottawa Senators defenceman Fred Lake, the Ontarios fared worse, winning only 4 games and losing 16, for a .200 winning percentage.

After one season, Wall sold the team to local amateur hockey impresario Eddie Livingstone. Livingstone acquired goaltender Percy LeSueur and forward Skene Ronan. He also added rookies Corb Denneny and Alf Skinner, and the McNamara brothers returned. The team had also acquired NHA scoring champion Tommy Smith before Livingtone took over. A tug of war developed over Smith's services. The Pacific Coast Hockey Association claimed Smith was their property; Livingstone, just as stubbornly, insisted he belonged to Toronto. The PCHA's bosses, Lester Patrick and Frank Patrick, threatened they would raid the NHA for players the next season.

== Shamrocks ==
After the first game of the season in January 1915, the team was renamed the Toronto Shamrocks. Livingstone said the idea came from the players because eight members of the team claimed Irish descent. The team colours were kept the same, but the O on the jerseys was replaced with a green shamrock. The Shamrocks finished the 1914–15 season with a record of seven wins and 13 losses, fifth in the league, ahead of only the Montreal Canadiens.

Meanwhile, Toronto's other NHA club, the Toronto Blueshirts, had fallen from first place to fourth. On the west coast, the Patrick brothers announced an expansion team, the Seattle Metropolitans and the PCHA zeroed in on the Blueshirts' roster, signing many of their top players. Livingstone purchased the Toronto Blueshirts and owned two NHA teams but after the PCHA raids only had enough players for one team. He transferred Shamrocks players to the Blueshirts, and only the Blueshirts competed in the 1915–16 NHA season. When Livingstone failed to sell the Shamrocks, the NHA seized the franchise, which was left dormant for the year. The National Hockey Association reactivated the abandoned Shamrocks franchise in 1916–17, awarding it to a Canadian military team, the Toronto 228th Battalion. The league became the National Hockey League the following season and neither of the Toronto NHA franchises were included in the new league.

== Season by season record ==
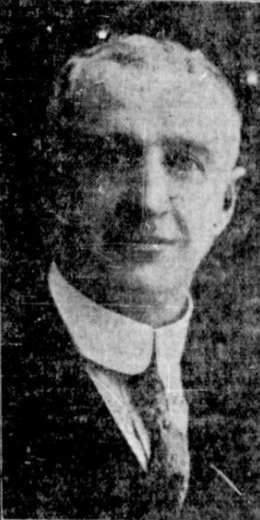
Ontarios head coach Jimmy Murphy.

Note: W = Wins, L = Losses, T = Ties, GF= Goals For, GA = Goals Against

Season	GP	W	L	T	GF	GA	Position
1912–13	20	7	13	0	59	98	6th
1913–14	20	4	16	0	61	118	6th
1914–15	20	7	13	0	76	96	5th

== Head coach ==
- Jimmy Murphy

== Hall of Fame players ==
- Percy LeSueur
- George McNamara
- Tommy Smith
- Cy Denneny

== See also ==
- National Hockey Association
