= 1912–13 NHA season =

Ice hockey season

- League: National Hockey Association
- Sport: Ice hockey
- Duration: December 25, 1912 – March 5, 1913
- Games: 20
- Teams: 6

Regular season
- Top scorer: Joe Malone (43)

O'Brien Cup
- Champions: Quebec Bulldogs
- Runners-up: Montreal Wanderers

NHA seasons
- ← 1911–12 1913–14 →

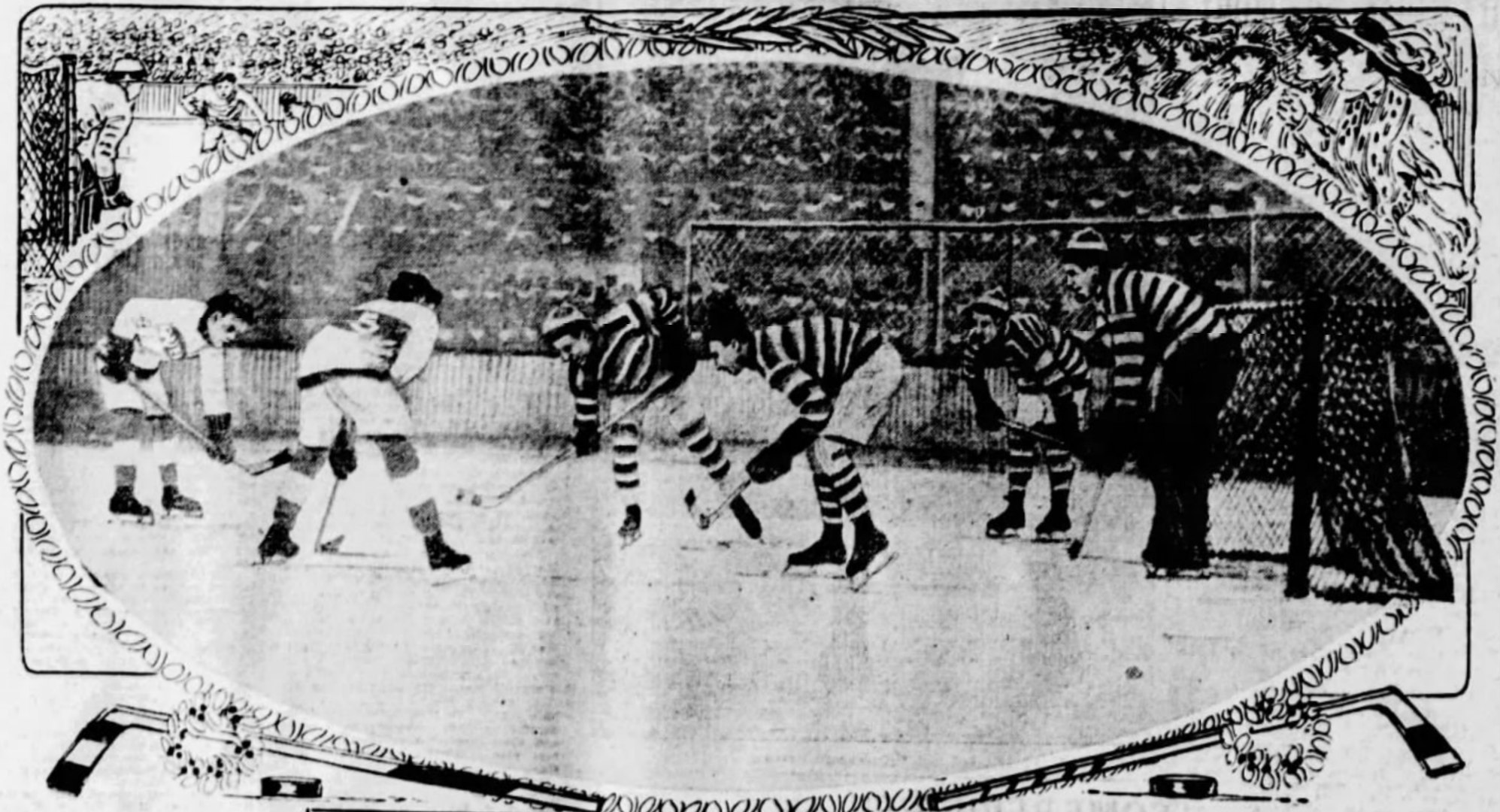
February 22, 1913 game between Quebec Bulldogs and Montreal Canadiens.

The 1912–13 NHA season was the fourth season of the National Hockey Association (NHA). Six teams played 20 games each. The Quebec Bulldogs won the league championship to retain the Stanley Cup. They played and defeated the Sydney Millionaires in a challenge after the regular season.

== League business ==
The Arena Gardens was completed in Toronto and the two dormant NHA franchises started play as the Toronto Hockey Club ('Torontos' or 'Blue Shirts') and the Toronto Tecumsehs ('Indians'). The Arena Gardens hosted a pre-season exhibition match between the Montreal Canadiens and Montreal Wanderers, at which a brawl broke out and Sprague Cleghorn would be charged with assault.

For this season the NHA teams played again with six skaters, abandoning the position of rover. It was agreed that from February onwards, the teams would play with seven. However, after several games at the start of February played with the rover, the decision was made to abandon the rover position permanently.

The Stanley Cup trustees decided prior to this season that all future Stanley Cup challenges would take place after the end of the regular season.

The Montreal Canadiens adopted a 'barber pole' style of jersey similar to the Ottawas with a CAC logo, prompting complaints from the Ottawas. The Ottawas' complaints were resolved with the Canadiens introducing a second jersey of solid red, with a wide blue stripe around the chest and the letter 'C' as a logo, used only when playing Ottawa. The solid red jersey with a wide blue stripe would be adopted full-time the following season and is the basis for the Canadiens jersey design to this day.

== Regular season ==
=== Final standing ===
Note GP = Games Played, W = Wins, L = Losses, T = Ties, GF = Goals For, GA = Goals Against

Team	GP	W	L	T	GF	GA
Quebec Bulldogs	20	16	4	0	112	75
Montreal Wanderers	20	10	10	0	93	90
Toronto Hockey Club	20	9	11	0	86	95
Montreal Canadiens	20	9	11	0	83	81
Ottawa Senators	20	9	11	0	87	81
Toronto Tecumsehs	20	7	13	0	59	98

=== Results ===
Month	Day	Visitor	Score	Home	Score
Dec.	25	Canadiens	9	Toronto HC	5
Dec.	28	Ottawa	3	Quebec	7
Dec.	28	Toronto HC	5	Canadiens	8
Dec.	28	Wanderers	7	Tecumsehs	4
Dec.	31	Quebec	3	Wanderers	1
Jan.	1	Toronto HC	1	Ottawa	7
Jan.	1	Canadiens	4	Tecumsehs	3
Jan.	4	Ottawa	7	Canadiens	3
Jan.	4	Tecumsehs	5	Quebec	3
Jan.	4	Wanderers	3	Toronto HC	5
Jan.	8	Ottawa	1	Tecumsehs	4
Jan.	8	Toronto HC	5	Quebec	10
Jan.	8	Canadiens	4	Wanderers	3
Jan.	11	Ottawa	5	Wanderers	11
Jan.	11	Canadiens	3	Quebec	4
Jan.	11	Toronto HC	2	Tecumsehs	5
Jan.	15	Wanderers	1	Ottawa	9
Jan.	15	Tecumsehs	1	Toronto HC	6
Jan.	15	Quebec	4	Canadiens	5
Jan.	18	Canadiens	6	Ottawa	0
Jan.	18	Quebec	4	Tecumsehs	2
Jan.	18	Toronto HC	1	Wanderers	3
Jan.	22	Tecumsehs	4	Ottawa	3 (OT 7')
Jan.	22	Quebec	3	Toronto HC	6
Jan.	22	Wanderers	4	Canadiens	3
Jan.	25	Ottawa	9	Toronto HC	5
Jan.	25	Wanderers	10	Quebec	6
Jan.	25	Tecumsehs	4	Canadiens	5 (OT 17")
Jan.	29	Tecumsehs	2	Wanderers	6
Jan.	29	Quebec	5	Ottawa	3
Feb.	1‡	Toronto HC	2	Wanderers	3
Feb.	1‡	Quebec	5	Tecumsehs	4 (OT 4')
Feb.	1‡	Canadiens	1	Ottawa	2
Feb.	5‡	Ottawa	0	Toronto HC	2
Feb.	5‡	Wanderers	3	Quebec	4
Feb.	5‡	Tecumsehs	5	Canadiens	4
Feb.	8‡	Quebec	4	Ottawa	1
Feb.	8	Tecumsehs	2	Wanderers	1
Feb.	8‡	Canadiens	3	Toronto HC	5
Feb.	12	Tecumsehs	0	Ottawa	11
Feb.	12	Quebec	11	Toronto HC	2
Feb.	12	Wanderers	4	Canadiens	6
Feb.	15	Ottawa	3	Canadiens	2
Feb.	15	Wanderers	3	Toronto HC	10
Feb.	15	Tecumsehs	0	Quebec	8
Feb.	19	Ottawa	2	Wanderers	8
Feb.	19	Canadiens	2	Quebec	4
Feb.	19	Toronto HC	7	Tecumsehs	3
Feb.	22	Wanderers	3	Ottawa	9
Feb.	22	Tecumsehs	3	Toronto HC	5
Feb.	22	Quebec	7	Canadiens	6
Feb.	26	Ottawa	3	Tecumsehs	4
Feb.	26	Toronto HC	4	Quebec	6
Feb.	26	Canadiens	4	Wanderers	5
Mar.	1	Canadiens	3	Tecumsehs	1
Mar.	1	Toronto HC	2	Ottawa	3
Mar.	1	Quebec	6	Wanderers	4
Mar.	5	Ottawa	6	Quebec	8
Mar.	5	Wanderers	10	Tecumsehs	3
Mar.	5	Toronto HC	6	Canadiens	2

‡ Played with rover (7 man hockey)

== Player statistics ==
=== Scoring leaders ===
Note: GP = Games played, G = Goals scored, PIM = Penalties in minutes

Name	Club	GP	G	PIM
Joe Malone	Quebec	20	43	34
Tommy Smith	Quebec	18	39	30
Harry Hyland	Wanderers	20	27	38
Frank Nighbor	Toronto	19	25	9
Newsy Lalonde	Canadiens	18	25	61
Didier Pitre	Canadiens	17	24	80
Punch Broadbent	Ottawa	20	20	15
Scotty Davidson	Toronto	20	19	69
Don Smith	Canadiens	20	19	52
Skene Ronan	Ottawa	20	18	39

=== Goaltending averages ===
Note: GP = Games played, W = Wins, L = Losses, T = Ties, Min = Minutes Played, GA = Goals against, SO = Shutouts, GAA = Goals against average

Name	Club	GP	W	L	T	Min	GA	SO	GAA
Clint Benedict	Ottawa	10	2	1	0	275	16	1	3.49^{D}
Paddy Moran	Quebec	20	16	4	0	1204	75	1	3.73^{A}
Georges Vezina	Canadiens	20	9	11	0	1217	81	1	3.99^{B}
Art Boyce	Wanderers	18	9	8	0	966	67	0	4.16
Percy LeSueur	Ottawa	18	7	10	0	934	65	0	4.18^{D}
Harry Holmes	Toronto	15	6	7	0	779	58	1	4.47^{E}
Billy Nicholson	Tecumsehs	20	7	13	0	1228	98	0	4.79^{C}
Ray Marchand	Toronto	8	3	4	0	421	37	0	5.27^{E}
Bert Cadotte	Wanderers	6	1	2	0	234	23	0	5.90

- A – Moran's record includes 4 minutes of overtime.
- B – Vezina's record includes 17 minutes of overtime.
- C – Nicholson's record includes 28 minutes of overtime.
- D – Benedict and LeSueur shared duties in eight games.
- E – Holmes and Marchand shared duties in three games.

== Stanley Cup challenges ==
As NHA champions, Quebec was immediately considered the Stanley Cup champion. The Cup trustees accepted a challenge from Sydney Millionaires, champions of the Maritime Professional Hockey League. The series was a two-game, total-goals series. All games were played in Quebec city.

=== Sydney vs. Quebec ===
Joe Malone scored nine goals in the first game. He was not in the lineup for the second game.

March 8, 1913
Sydney	3		Quebec	14
Toby McDonald		G	Paddy Moran	
George Trenouth	1	P	Joe Hall	
Alf McDonald Capt.		CP	Harry Mummery	1
Ken Randall	1	C	Joe Malone	9
Bill Dunphy		RW	Rusty Crawford	3
Jim Fraser		LW	Tommy Smith	
Joe Tetreault	1	sub	Billy Creighton	1

March 10, 1913
Sydney	2		Quebec	6
Toby McDonald		G	Paddy Moran	
George Trenouth	1	P	Joe Hall	3
Alf McDonald	Capt.	CP	Harry Mummery	
Ken Randall		C	Tommy Smith	1
Bill Dunphy		RW	Billy Creighton	2
Jim Fraser		LW	Jack Marks	
Jim Wilkie	1	sub		

Quebec wins series 20–5

== Post-season exhibition series ==
After the season a series was arranged between Ottawa and Montreal Wanderers and Quebec to play in New York. Ottawa and Montreal played first, with the winner to play-off against Quebec. After the Wanderers defeated Ottawa 10–8 (3–2, 7–6), the Wanderers won the two-game series against Quebec 12–10 (9–5, 3–5).

Date	Winning Team	Score	Losing Team	Location
March 8, 1913	Montreal Wanderers	3–2	Ottawa	St. Nicholas Rink, New York
March 10, 1913	Montreal Wanderers	7–6	Ottawa	St. Nicholas Rink, New York
March 13, 1913	Montreal Wanderers	9–5	Quebec	St. Nicholas Rink, New York
March 15, 1913	Quebec	5–3	Montreal Wanderers	St. Nicholas Rink, New York

Sources

- "WANDERERS TAKE GAME FROM OTTAWA; Canadian Hockey Teams Make Thrilling Spectacle on Ice in St. Nicholas Rink". New York Times. March 11, 1913. p. 9.
- "CANADIAN HOCKEY THRILLS AT RINK; Wanderers of Montreal Defeat Quebec Team in Brilliant Match, 9 to 5". New York Times. March 14, 1913. p. 10.
- "WANDERERS WIN HOCKEY SERIES; St. Nicholas Rink Packed for Final Canadian Game Won by Quebec". New York Times. March 16, 1913. p. S2.

=== Quebec series in Victoria, B.C. ===
Quebec travelled to Victoria, British Columbia to play an exhibition series with the Victoria Senators. The Senators had requested a challenge series with Quebec, but would not travel to Quebec City, but would play a series in Toronto. Bulldogs would not agree to defend the Cup on any other ice than their home rink. The Senators would win the best-of-three series.

- March 24, 7-5 for Victoria; March 27, 6-3 for Quebec; March 29, for 6-1 Victoria to win exhibition Series 2–1

March 24, 1913
Quebec	4		Victoria	3
Paddy Moran		G	Bert Lindsay	
Harry Mummery		P	George "Goldie" Prodgers	
Joe Hall		CP	Lester Patrick playing-Manager-Coach	1
Rusty Crawford	1	R	Skinner Poulin	2
Joe Malone Capt.	2	C	Tommy Dunderdale Capt.	1
Jack Marks	1	RW	Bobby Rowe	1
Tommy Smith	1	LW	Bob Genge	2
Jeff Malone -C		spare	Jack Ulrich -RW	
Billy Creighton -P/RW		spare	Walter Smaill LW	

Game one was played with 7 players on a side including the Rover position and PCHL rules.

March 27, 1913
Quebec	6		Victoria	3
Paddy Moran		G	Bert Lindsay	
Harry Mummery	1	P	George "Goldie" Prodgers	1
Joe Hall		CP	Lester Patrick playing-Manager-Coach	1
Joe Malone Capt.	2	C	Tommy Dunderdale Capt.	
Rusty Crawford	2	RW	Bob Genge	
Jack Marks	1	LW	Skinner Poulin	
Tommy Smith -LW	2	Sub	Walter Smaill -LW	1
Jeff Malone -C		spare	Jack Ulrich -RW	
Billy Creighton -P/RW		spare	Bobby Rowe -RW	

Game two was played with 6 players on a side without a Rover position under NHA rules.

March 29, 1913
Quebec	1		Victoria	6
Paddy Moran		G	Bert Lindsay	
Harry Mummery		P	George "Goldie" Prodgers	
Joe Hall		CP	Lester Patrick playing-Manager-Coach	2
Rusty Crawford		R	Bobby Genge	2
Joe Malone Capt.		C	Tommy Dunderdale Capt.	2
Jack Marks		RW	Bobby Rowe	
Tommy Smith	1	LW	Skinner Poulin	
			Walter Smaill LW-sub	
Jeff Malone -C		spare	Jack Ulrich -RW	
Billy Creighton -P/RW		spare		

Game three was played with seven players on a side including the Rover position and PCHL rules. Victoria won the series two games to one.

=== Tecumsehs in Boston ===
The Tecumsehs travelled to Boston to play an exhibition series against New Glasgow of Nova Scotia.

== Stanley Cup engraving ==
The 1913 Stanley Cup was presented by the trophy's trustee William Foran.

1912–13 Quebec Bulldogs
Players
Forwards
Joe Malone (captain) (center)
Jeff Malone (center)
Tommy Smith (center/left wing)
Walter Rooney (spare) ‡
Rusty Crawford (right wing/rover)
Billy Creighton (point/left wing)
Jack Marks (right wing)
Defencemen
Joe Hall (point)
Harry Mummery (cover point)
James "Rocket" Power (cover point) †
Goaltender
Patrick Paddy Moran
Joe Savard (spare – did not play) †

‡ Did not play but on the team picture)

† – Missing from both team pictures

non-players =

- Philippe-Auguste Choquette (president/owner),
- Mike Quinn (Vice President/Manager), Dave Beland (trainer)
- J. Eugène Matte (Treasurer), Barney J. Kaine (Secretary)
- Louis A. Lagueux, Charles Fremont, W.L. MacWilliam (directors)††
- Camélien Joseph Lockwell, Fred Hill, Arthur Derome, R.J.G. Goss (directors)††

†† – first name remains unknown

- (There are two pictures for 1912–13 Quebec Bulldogs – the more common picture included the Manager, Trainer, and 10 players. The other picture included 10 players and 12 non-players.)

== See also ==
- National Hockey Association
- List of pre-NHL seasons
- List of Stanley Cup champions
- 1912 in sports
- 1913 in sports

Preceded by Quebec Bulldogs; 1912	Quebec Bulldogs; Stanley Cup Champions; 1913	Succeeded by Toronto Hockey Club; 1914
Preceded by 1911–12 NHA season	NHA seasons 1912–13	Succeeded by 1913–14 NHA season
