= 1911–12 NHA season =

Ice hockey season

- League: National Hockey Association
- Sport: Ice hockey
- Duration: December 25, 1911 – March 5, 1912
- Games: 18
- Teams: 4

Regular season
- Top scorer: Skene Ronan (35)

O'Brien Cup
- Champions: Quebec Bulldogs
- Runners-up: Ottawa Hockey Club

NHA seasons
- ← 1910–11 1912–13 →

The 1911–12 NHA season was the third season of the National Hockey Association (NHA). Four teams played 18 games each. The Quebec Bulldogs would win the league championship and take over the Stanley Cup.

== League business ==
Two NHA franchises would be dormant this season. Because the O'Briens had decided to give up hockey, the Renfrew Creamery Kings were disbanded prior to the season, with the players distributed to the other teams by a draw of names. Two new teams based in Toronto intended to operate this season, the 'Torontos' and the 'Tecumsehs', but the new Arena Gardens would not be ready for play this season, so neither team played. This left four teams to play 18 games each. The Wanderers were sold to Sam Lichtenhein.

=== Renfrew dispersal ===
- Cyclone Taylor, Don Smith—Wanderers
- Odie Cleghorn—Quebec
- Sprague Cleghorn—Toronto
- Bert Lindsay—Tecumsehs
- Skene Ronan—Ottawa
- Larry Gilmour —Canadiens

"Tecumsehs admitted", The Globe, p. 13, 1911-11-13

Taylor would refuse to report to the Wanderers, while Don Smith and Bert Lindsay would join the PCHA. Odie Cleghorn refused to report to Quebec and joined the Wanderers as did his brother Sprague.

=== Executive ===
- Emmett Quinn (president)

Board of Directors:

- E. McCafferty, Quebec
- Sam Lichtenhein, Wanderers,
- George Kennedy, Canadiens
- Charles Sparks, Ottawa
- J. Jane, Toronto
- Fred Robertson, Toronto

=== Rule changes ===
The rule changes implemented for this season introduced the format of play seen today.

For this season, the number of players per side was reduced to six by the elimination of the rover position. This was opposed by several teams, including the champion Ottawa team whose 'puck possession' style of play was dependent on the rover. The team would attempt during this season and next to get the league to return to seven-man hockey.

This season saw the introduction of major and minor fouls.

Major Fouls:

- throwing a stick to prevent a goal
- cross-checking
- charging
- deliberate tripping and hooking
- foul language

for which the player would be banished for the match and fined $5. Teams could substitute the player.

Minor Fouls:

- kicking, throwing, holding or batting puck with the hand
- raising stick above shoulder except for 'lifting'
- loafing offside

for which the player drew a caution. Three cautions and you were out. If your fines reached $25, special discipline might be warranted by the president.

Other Rules:

- number armbands to identify players
- home club to choose end
- overtime in case of tie
- unlimited substitution, however unless in case of injury, the player could not return

The O'Brien Cup was introduced for the NHA league championship winners.

The Canadiens team was to sign only francophone players and the other teams would refrain from doing so.

Coleman, "Trail of the Stanley Cup"

=== Equipment changes ===
The league would adopt the LeSueur goal and the Spalding puck as official equipment. This was the first season that numbers were attached to player jerseys. At first, they were attached by armbands, then eventually stitched onto the front of the jerseys. To identify the players to the fans, a large 'key' sign was hung at the side of the rink.

=== NHA – PCHA relations ===
In a foreshadowing of when the NHL in 1926 would declare the American Hockey League an "outlaw league", the NHA declared the Pacific Coast Hockey Association (PCHA) an "outlaw league" after it signed several NHA players. The league expelled Newsy Lalonde, Ernie Johnson and other players who signed with the PCHA 'for life' and barred NHA teams from playing PCHA teams. After the season, Art Ross arranged an 'all-star' tour of NHA players in British Columbia against the PCHA in defiance of the league. The NHA granted immunity for the players to play against the PCHA.

== Regular season ==
Prior to the season, on November 2, Bruce Ridpath of the Stanley Cup champion Ottawa Hockey Club would be seriously injured with a fractured skull after being hit by an automobile on Yonge Street in Toronto. He lived in Toronto and was rumoured to be a possible manager of the future Toronto NHA franchise.

Fred Taylor went on public record stating that he would not play for Wanderers as he had a good position with the Interior Department in Ottawa, and would not play at all instead of playing for the Wanderers. Ottawa would attempt to secure his rights from Montreal. Ottawa would offer to trade Ronan (who would go on to win the scoring championship) for Taylor but was turned down.

On November 18, the NHA developed a schedule with a provisional opening date of the Arena Gardens late in January, and allowed the two new Toronto teams to play only away games at the start of the season. The architects of the Gardens assured them that the arena would be ready in time.

The PCHA raids, while taking players from the NHA, also meant the demise of the OPHL and players from the OPHL signed with NHA clubs, including Louis Berlinguette, Ernie Dubeau, Jack Marks and George Prodger.

In this season, the Ottawa Hockey Club became more commonly known as the 'Ottawa Senators'. The organization remained known as the Ottawa Hockey Association.

=== Highlights ===
Ronan of Ottawa would score 5 goals against the Wanderers on February 9, and follow up with 8 against the Wanderers on February 14. Gordon Roberts of the Wanderers would score 6 against the Canadiens on February 21.

On January 24, Fred 'Cyclone' Taylor played for Ottawa against the Wanderers, despite his rights being held by the Wanderers, for which he refused to play for. Ottawa would win the game, but it was protested and ordered replayed if necessary. This was Taylor's final game in the NHA, as he would join Vancouver the next year.

On March 2, Quebec defeated Ottawa 6–5 in a game decided after 23 minutes of overtime. With seven seconds to play, Joe Malone scored to tie the game. Joe Hall scored the winning goal. Ottawa would now have to play the replay game against the Wanderers in Montreal. On March 6, Ottawa lost the replay, and the loss would cost them a tie of the league championship, as Quebec finished 10–8 and Ottawa would finish 9–9.

=== Final standing ===
Pos	Team	Pld	W	L	D	GF	GA	GD
1	Quebec Hockey Club	18	10	8	0	81	79	+2
2	Ottawa Hockey Club	17	9	8	0	99	83	+16
3	Montreal Wanderers	18	9	9	0	95	96	−1
4	Montreal Canadiens	18	8	10	0	59	66	−7

=== Results ===
Month	Day	Visitor	Score	Home	Score
Dec.	30	Wanderers	9	Quebec HC	5
Jan.	3	Quebec HC	4	Ottawa HC	5
Jan.	3	Wanderers	5	Canadiens	0
Jan.	6	Ottawa HC	5	Wanderers	9
Jan.	6	Canadiens	5	Quebec HC	4
Jan.	10	Ottawa HC	4	Quebec HC	6
Jan.	10	Wanderers	1	Canadiens	6
Jan.	13	Ottawa HC	4	Canadiens	3
Jan.	17	Canadiens	5	Ottawa HC	4
Jan.	17	Quebec HC	5	Wanderers	4
Jan.	20	Quebec HC	2	Ottawa HC	5
Jan.	20	Canadiens	6	Wanderers	3
Jan.	24 †	Ottawa HC	10	Wanderers	6
Jan.	24	Canadiens	2	Quebec HC	4
Jan.	27	Wanderers	9	Ottawa HC	6
Jan.	27	Quebec HC	3	Canadiens	5
Jan.	31	Ottawa HC	4	Quebec HC	5
Jan.	31	Wanderers	2	Canadiens	1
Feb.	3	Ottawa HC	3	Canadiens	9
Feb.	3	Wanderers	2	Quebec HC	7
Feb.	7	Canadiens	2	Ottawa HC	4
Feb.	7	Quebec HC	6	Wanderers	7
Feb.	9	Canadiens	2	Quebec HC	5
Feb.	9	Ottawa HC	13	Wanderers	10
Feb.	14	Wanderers	5	Ottawa HC	17
Feb.	14	Quebec HC	2	Canadiens	1
Feb.	18	Canadiens	1	Ottawa HC	6
Feb.	18	Quebec HC	6	Wanderers	9
Feb.	21	Ottawa HC	3	Quebec HC	6
Feb.	21	Canadiens	1	Wanderers	9
Feb.	25	Wanderers	1	Quebec HC	2
Feb.	25	Ottawa HC	3	Canadiens	2 (OT 22')
Feb.	28	Wanderers	4	Ottawa HC	6
Feb.	28	Quebec HC	3	Canadiens	6
Mar.	2	Quebec HC	6	Ottawa HC	5 (OT 23'50")
Mar.	2	Canadiens	2	Wanderers	1 (OT 6'36")
Mar.	6‡	Wanderers	5	Ottawa HC	2

† Protested by Wanderers, replayed on March 6. Often mistaken as March 5th.

‡ Replay of protested game.

== Player statistics ==
=== Scoring leaders ===
Note: GP = Games played, G = Goals scored, PIM = Penalties in minutes

Name	Club	GP	G	PIM
Skene Ronan	Ottawa HC	18	35	5
Didier Pitre	Canadiens	18	27	40
Ernie Russell	Wanderers	18	27	110
Dubbie Kerr	Ottawa HC	18	24	35
Odie Cleghorn	Wanderers	17	23	0
Joe Malone	Quebec HC	18	21	0
Eddie Oatman	Quebec HC	18	20	20
Jack Patrick McDonald	Quebec HC	17	18	0
Gordon Roberts	Wanderers	18	16	28
Jack Darragh	Ottawa HC	17	15	10

=== Goaltending averages ===
Note: GP = Games played, GA = Goals against, SO = Shutouts, GAA = Goals against average

Name	Club	GP	GA	SO	GAA
Georges Vezina	Canadiens	18	66		3.7
Paddy Moran	Quebec HC	18	79		4.4
George Broughton	Wanderers	6	27	1	4.5
Percy LeSueur	Ottawa HC	18	93		5.2
Art Boyce	Wanderers	12	69		5.8

== Post-season ==
=== Stanley Cup challenges ===
After the season, Quebec played one challenge against the Moncton Victorias. The Moncton team was essentially the same Galt team that had challenged Ottawa in 1911. This was the first series playing six to a side.

==== Moncton vs. Quebec ====
March 11, 1912
Moncton	3		Quebec	9
Billy Hague		G	Paddy Moran	
Rastus Murphy		P	Goldie Prodgers	
Fred Povey		CP	Joe Hall	2
Tommy Smith Capt.	2	C	Joe Malone Capt.	3
Rollie Norman	1	RW	Eddie Oatman	
Louis Berlinguette		LW	Jack McDonald	4
Fred Doherty		sub	Jack Marks	
Referees – J. Marshall, C. McNamara

March 13, 1912
Moncton	0		Quebec	8
Billy Hague		G	Paddy Moran	
Rastus Murphy		P	Goldie Prodgers	
Fred Povey		CP	Joe Hall	
Tommy Smith Capt.		C	Joe Malone Capt.	2
Rollie Norman		RW	Jack Marks	
Louis Berlinguette		LW	Jack McDonald	5
Fred Doherty		sub	Walter Rooney	1
		sub	George Leonard	
Referees – J. Marshall, C. McNamara

Quebec wins best-of-three series 2–0

==== Unplayed challenges ====
The Port Arthur Bearcats, who had previously challenged Ottawa in a Cup challenge in 1911, issued a challenge in February 1912. They were ordered by the Stanley Cup trustees to play off against Saskatoon in a two-game total-goals series to qualify. Port Arthur defeated Saskatoon 12–6. The club chose not to play a series against Quebec.

In February 1912, prior to the end of the PCHA season, the PCHA issued a challenge to play against the NHA champions. However, their season ended in March and it was considered too late for the PCHA champions (in this case the New Westminster Royals) to travel to the east to face Quebec. The challenge was postponed until December 1912. The challenge was never played.

=== Exhibitions ===
On March 10, the Wanderers and Canadiens played for the Montreal city hockey championship. Wanderers would win 10–2, despite an outstanding display by Georges Vezina.

Ottawa intended to hold a benefit game for Bruce Ridpath who had been injured in an automobile accident, intending to play a team composed of all-stars from the other NHA teams. After changing dates several times, the All-Star benefit game was set for March 16. The All-Star team would have Art Ross, Ernie Russell and Gordon Roberts of the Wanderers; Paddy Moran, Joe Malone and Joe Hall of Quebec; Didier Pitre Jack Laviolette and Ernie Dubeau of the Canadiens. Additionally, Cyclone Tayler had permission to play. However, two days before the event was to occur, the NHA president Emmett Quinn, while in New York city, booked the Wanderers and Canadiens for an exhibition game in Boston, and Ottawa was unable to make alternate arrangements, cancelling the NHA benefit. The Ottawa New Edinburghs, champions of the amateur Inter-Provincial Amateur Hockey Union (IPAHU) held their own benefit for Ridpath on March 23 against other IPAHU players. Future professional stars Clint Benedict, Harry Broadbent and Eddie Gerard played for Ottawa, which raised $300 for Ridpath, while Cyclone Taylor was the referee.

All four NHA teams played an exhibition series in New York and Boston from March 16 – March 23.

==== Art Ross All-Stars ====
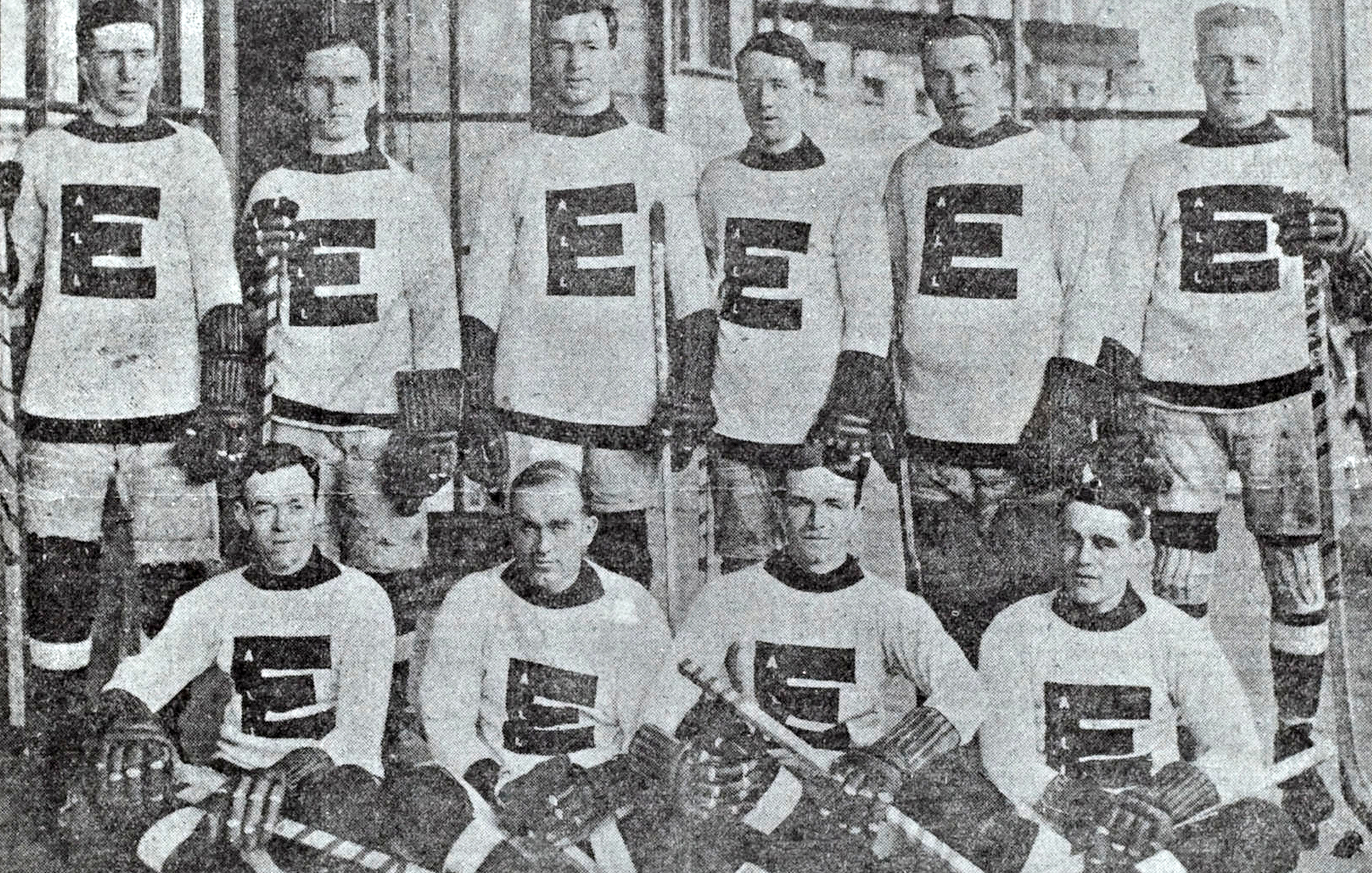
Eastern All Star Team in 1912. Top row, from left: Sprague Cleghorn, Hamby Shore, Art Ross, Skene Ronan, Paddy Moran, Odie Cleghorn. Front row, from left: Jack McDonald, Cyclone Taylor, Jack Darragh, Joe Malone.

A group of players, dubbed the 'Art Ross All-Stars' played three games against a PCHA all-star team in British Columbia from April 2 – April 6, losing two out of three games, 4–10, 2–8, 6–5. Hughie Lehman, Frank Patrick, Ernie Johnson, Newsy Lalonde, Tom Dunderdale, Ran McDonald and Harry Hyland played for the Western stars, and Paddy Moran, Art Ross, Hamby Shore, Skene Ronan, Joe Malone, Odie Cleghorn and Jack McDonald played for the East with Cyclone Taylor substituting for Malone.

== Stanley Cup engraving ==
The 1912 Stanley Cup was presented by the trophy's trustee William Foran.

1911–12 Quebec Bulldogs
Players
Forwards
George Carey (Right Wing)
George Leonard (Left Wing)
Jack Marks (Right Wing)
Jack MacDonald (Left Wing)
Eddie Oatman (Right Wing)
Joe Malone (Captain-Center)
Walter Rooney (Center)
Defencemen
Joe Hall (Cover point)
George Goldie Prodgers(point)
Jack Grannery(cover point) †
Goaltender
Patrick Paddy Moran
Joe Savard (Sub)

† missing from team picture.

non-players =

- Philippe-Auguste Choquette (President/Owner), Mike Quinn (Vice President/Manager)
- Charlie Nolan (Coach), Dave Beland (Trainer)
- J. Eugène Matte (Treasurer), Barney J. Kaine (Secretary)
- Louis A. Lagueux, Charles Fremont, Thomas B. O'Neil (Directors)
- Camélien Joseph Lockwell, Fred Hill, Arthur Demore (Directors)

== See also ==
- National Hockey Association
- List of pre-NHL seasons
- List of Stanley Cup champions
- 1911 in sports
- 1912 in sports
- 1912 PCHA season

Preceded by Ottawa Hockey Club; 1911	Quebec Bulldogs; Stanley Cup Champions; 1912	Succeeded by Quebec Bulldogs; 1913
Preceded by 1910–11 NHA season	NHA seasons 1911–12	Succeeded by 1912–13 NHA season
