= Walter Rooney =

Walter Rooney may refer to:

- Walter Rooney (ice hockey) (1888–1965), Canadian ice hockey player
- Walter Rooney (footballer) (1902–1963), English footballer
