= Percy Thompson =

Canadian ice hockey team owner-manager

Hugh Percy Thompson (b. November 16, 1879 - d. February 4, 1963) was a Canadian businessman and professional ice hockey executive. He was the part-owner and manager of the Hamilton Tigers team in the National Hockey League.

In 1920, Thompson was a partner in the 'Abso-Pure Ice Company' of Hamilton, Ontario, which had built the Barton Street Arena. After being approached by competing interests interested in setting up a professional ice hockey team in Hamilton, Abso-Pure and Thompson paid $5000 to Frank Calder, the president of the NHL to purchase the Quebec Bulldogs franchise. The payment was made directly to Frank Calder, not the NHL.

Thompson would remain manager of the team until it was dissolved in the fall of 1925 after the team's players had been sold to the New York Americans and the franchise revoked by the NHL. He would continue as part-owner of the Hamilton Tigers minor league team until 1930, when it was sold to become the Syracuse Stars. He also coached the minor league team from 1926 until 1928.

== NHL coaching record ==
Team	Year	Regular season						Postseason
Team	Year	G	W	L	T	Pts	Division rank	Result
Hamilton Tigers	1920–21	24	6	18	0	12	4th in NHL	Missed playoffs
Hamilton Tigers	1921–22	24	7	17	0	14	4th in NHL	Missed playoffs
NHL Total		48	13	35	0			

Preceded by Quebec Bulldogs coaches M. J. Quinn	Head coach of the Hamilton Tigers; 1920–22	Succeeded by Art Ross
