= Joe Savard =

Canadian ice hockey player

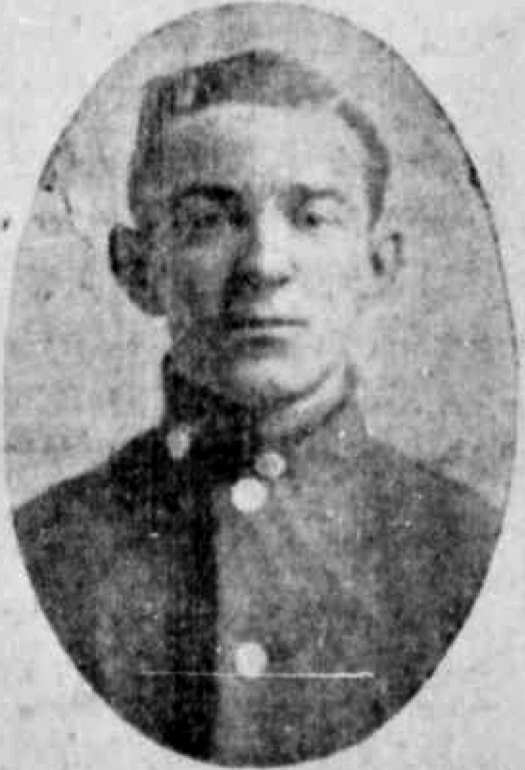
- Born: March 6, 1890; Quebec City, Quebec, Canada
- Died: April 28, 1961 (aged 71)
- Height: 5 ft 3 in (160 cm)
- Weight: 120 lb (54 kg; 8 st 8 lb)
- Position: Goaltender
- Played for: Quebec Hockey Club
- Playing career: 1909–1915

Joseph Daniel Savard (March 6, 1890 – April 28, 1961) was a Canadian professional ice hockey goaltender. He played in the National Hockey Association (NHA) for the Quebec Bulldogs. In 1911–12 he played one game, due to Paddy Moran being injured. He was included on the Quebec Bulldogs Stanley Cup picture in 1912. In 1912–13 he served as substitute goaltender for the Bulldogs in the NHA, but did not see any ice time.

In 1914 Savard moved on to play for the Sydney Millionaires in the Maritimes.
