= Laureat Pouliot =

- Born: March 18, 1890 Quebec City, Quebec, Canada
- Died: May 14, 1935 (aged 45)
- Position: Forward
- Played for: Quebec Bulldogs
- Playing career: 1908–1917

Laureat Arthur "Pit" Pouliot (March 18, 1890 – May 14, 1935) was a professional ice hockey player. He played with the Quebec Bulldogs of the National Hockey Association.
