= Edwin McGregor =

Canadian ice hockey player

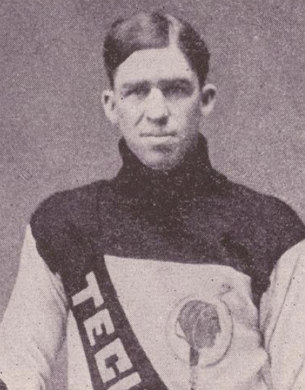
- McGregor with Tecumseh Lacrosse Club (Toronto) in 1911
- Born: February 9, 1885; Almonte, Ontario, Canada
- Died: February 8, 1955 (aged 69); Ottawa, Ontario, Canada
- Position: Right wing
- Played for: Montreal Wanderers
- Playing career: 1904–1914

Edwin Franklin McGregor (February 9, 1885 – February 8, 1955) was a Canadian professional ice hockey player. He played with the Montreal Wanderers of the National Hockey Association during the 1911–12 season.

McGregor was also a lacrosse player, representing the Tecumseh Lacrosse Club in Toronto in 1911.
