= Gordon Roberts (ice hockey) =

Canadian ice hockey player (1891–1966)

- Hockey Hall of Fame, 1971
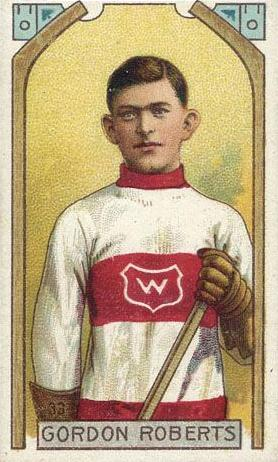
- Born: September 5, 1891 Ottawa, Ontario, Canada
- Died: September 2, 1966 (aged 74) Oakland, California, U.S.
- Height: 5 ft 11 in (180 cm)
- Weight: 180 lb (82 kg; 12 st 12 lb)
- Position: Left wing
- Shot: Left
- Played for: Ottawa Hockey Club; Montreal Wanderers; Vancouver Millionaires; Seattle Metropolitans
- Playing career: 1909–1920

Gordon William "Doc" Roberts (September 5, 1891 – September 2, 1966) was a Canadian professional ice hockey player who was a forward for the Ottawa Hockey Club and Montreal Wanderers of the National Hockey Association (NHA) and the Vancouver Millionaires and Seattle Metropolitans of the Pacific Coast Hockey Association (PCHA). He was a member of the Ottawa team that defended the Stanley Cup in a 1910 challenge; Roberts scored seven goals in two games in his team's victory over the Edmonton Hockey Club. He moved to Montreal in 1910 where he was consistently among the NHA's leading scorers with the Wanderers while also studying medicine at McGill University.

While in Montreal, Roberts attended McGill University, where he studied to become a physician. Following his graduation, he settled in British Columbia to begin his medical career. Continuing his hockey career, Roberts joined the Vancouver Millionaires where he was named a PCHA all-star at left wing and led the league in scoring with 43 goals in 1916–17. He retired from hockey in 1918 following a season in Seattle before Vancouver lured him back to the game one year later. Roberts left the sport again in 1920 and his medical career ultimately took him to Oakland, California where he practiced for over 40 years. He was posthumously inducted into the Hockey Hall of Fame in 1971.

== Playing career ==
Roberts participated in several sports in his youth. In addition to hockey, he played lacrosse and football. Roberts focused on hockey, however, and played for several teams in his hometown of Ottawa. He was the leading scorer of the Ottawa City Hockey League in 1908–09 as a member of the Emmitts Hockey Club with 19 goals in six games.

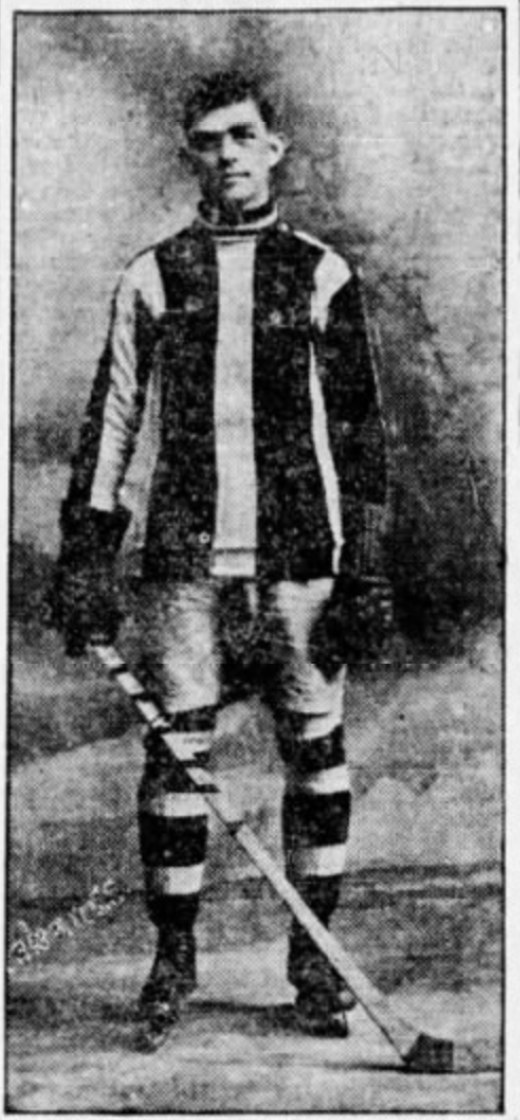
Roberts with the Ottawa Senators

When he turned professional in 1909 by joining the Ottawa Hockey Club, Roberts was one of the youngest players in his league at the age of 18 years. He scored three goals with the team in a single game in the short-lived Canadian Hockey Association before Ottawa jumped to the National Hockey Association (NHA) for the remainder of the season. In nine NHA games, Roberts recorded 13 goals. Ottawa was the defending Stanley Cup champions and, during the season, were challenged for the trophy by the Alberta champion Edmonton Hockey Club in January 1910. The Ottawa Citizen described Roberts as being the star of the first game. The paper praised his defensive checking in addition to his four goals scored in an 8–4 victory. He added three goals in the second game as Ottawa retained control of the Stanley Cup by a 21–11 aggregate score.

Having enrolled at McGill University to study medicine, Roberts moved to Montreal. He continued to play hockey and lacrosse but could not play football as McGill was unable to have him certified as an amateur. Also ineligible to play collegiate hockey, he joined the Montreal Wanderers for the 1910–11 NHA season. Roberts played only four NHA games that year, but thereafter was consistently one of the league's leading scorers. Following a pair of 16-goal seasons, Roberts finished second in league scoring with 31 goals in 1913–14 and with 29 in 1914–15. He was also named a league all-star in 1914.

Roberts found it difficult to both study and play hockey, but praised the support of his classmates and the faculty in helping him earn his degree. He had to complete an extra year of schooling after failing his second year, but graduated from McGill in 1916. Following an 18-goal season in 1915–16, he left Montreal to take up practice in British Columbia. Roberts continued his hockey career and joined the Vancouver Millionaires of the Pacific Coast Hockey Association (PCHA). He led the PCHA in scoring with 43 goals – in 23 games – and was named a league all-star on left wing. His medical career took him to Seattle and as a result, he joined the Seattle Metropolitans for the 1917–18 PCHA season. He retired in 1918 to focus on his medical career in the Howe Sound region of British Columbia, but was lured back to the PCHA by the Millionaires for the 1919–20 season. He scored 16 goals in 22 games for Vancouver before permanently retiring from hockey.

== Playing style ==
"All hockey addicts - and who isn't - remember Gordie Roberts, who carried more smoke in his left hand than probably any hockey player that ever laced on a skate…He had a swaying style of skating and he hunched his shoulders as he loomed up before the defence and just let blaze a shoulder high shot that had a habit of streaking down below the waist."

— Hall of Fame sports journalist Baz O'Meara writing about Roberts nine years after his retirement

Roberts was considered by his contemporaries to be one of the greatest left wings in the sport's history. His wrist shot, one of the most fearsome of the pre-1927 era, became the stuff of legend across the country, in both the PCHA and NHA. Amongst the sporting press, he was often said to have had "the hardest and most deceptive shot in hockey" during the 1910s.

Roberts was sometimes described as being the inventor of the "curved shot", preceding and outmatching players such as Harry Cameron, Babe Dye and Didier Pitre. Bernie Morris, and Hall of Famers Frank Foyston and Lester Patrick all attested to the unrivalled effectiveness and dramatic trajectory of Roberts’ shot. Clint Benedict, often considered the greatest goalie of the 1893–1926 era also gave praise to Roberts’ accuracy coupled with his ability to curve the puck.

Roberts was noted for being able to get his shot off at very bad angles from close in, as well as drive it in from far outside the reach and typical positional range of defenceman.

Notwithstanding his shooting prowess, Roberts was also well regarded for his stamina and skating ability, as well as being an above-average defensive checker. Despite being a physical player, Roberts (like his contemporary Frank Nighbor) was noted for his gentlemanly conduct on the ice – which he may have used to protect himself from retaliation. Montreal Canadiens bench boss George Kennedy told a story of a game against the Montreal Wanderers in which Didier Pitre was being tripped and butt-ended by the rugged Wanderers winger:

Kennedy screamed at Pitre, 'Are you afraid of Roberts?'

'No, sure not,' was Pitre's surprised response.

'Well, why don't you hit him back?' Kennedy snapped.

'How can I hit back?' Pitre asked. 'Roberts, he is very polite, very nice. Each time I fall, he helps me get up and apologizes and says it is an accident ... can I hit a man who is apologizing to me? No, never, it is not done'.

== Personal life ==
Born September 5, 1891, and raised in Ottawa, Roberts was the youngest of ten children; he had eight brothers and a sister. His brother Laurie was also a doctor and athlete, while another brother, Eddie, fought and died in the First World War. Roberts returned east in 1922 where he did post-graduate studies in New York. The Ottawa Senators, then of the National Hockey League, attempted to bring him out of retirement again and Cornell University sought his services as a lacrosse coach. Roberts turned down both offers and chose to retain focus on his medical career; He moved to California where he taught for a time at Stanford University Hospital. By 1925, he settled in Oakland where he practiced as an obstetrician for over 40 years. Roberts also acted as a referee at California Hockey League games. Roberts died September 2, 1966, and in 1971 was posthumously inducted into the Hockey Hall of Fame.

== Career statistics ==
| | | | Regular season | | | | | Playoffs |
| Season | Team | League | GP | G | A | Pts | PIM | GP | G | A | Pts | PIM |
|---|---|---|---|---|---|---|---|---|---|---|---|---|
| 1908–09 | Ottawa Emmets | OCHL | 6 | 19 | 0 | 19 | 8 | 2 | 2 | 0 | 2 | 0 |
| 1909–10 | Ottawa Hockey Club | CHA | 1 | 3 | 0 | 3 | 6 | — | — | — | — | — |
| 1909–10 | Ottawa Hockey Club | NHA | 9 | 13 | 0 | 13 | 34 | — | — | — | — | — |
| 1909–10 | Ottawa Seconds | OCHL | 1 | 3 | 0 | 3 | 5 | — | — | — | — | — |
| 1909–10 | Ottawa Hockey Club | St-Cup | — | — | — | — | — | 2 | 7 | 0 | 7 | 0 |
| 1910–11 | Montreal Wanderers | NHA | 4 | 1 | 0 | 1 | 3 | — | — | — | — | — |
| 1911–12 | Montreal Wanderers | NHA | 18 | 16 | 0 | 16 | 28 | — | — | — | — | — |
| 1912–13 | Montreal Wanderers | NHA | 16 | 16 | 0 | 16 | 22 | — | — | — | — | — |
| 1913–14 | Montreal Wanderers | NHA | 20 | 31 | 13 | 44 | 15 | — | — | — | — | — |
| 1914–15 | Montreal Wanderers | NHA | 19 | 29 | 5 | 34 | 74 | 2 | 0 | 0 | 0 | 15 |
| 1915–16 | Montreal Wanderers | NHA | 21 | 18 | 7 | 25 | 64 | — | — | — | — | — |
| 1916–17 | Vancouver Millionaires | PCHA | 23 | 43 | 10 | 53 | 42 | — | — | — | — | — |
| 1917–18 | Seattle Metropolitans | PCHA | 18 | 20 | 3 | 23 | 24 | 2 | 0 | 0 | 0 | 3 |
| 1919–20 | Vancouver Millionaires | PCHA | 22 | 16 | 3 | 19 | 13 | 2 | 1 | 0 | 1 | 0 |
| NHA totals | | | 107 | 124 | 25 | 149 | 240 | 2 | 0 | 0 | 0 | 15 |
| PCHA totals | | | 63 | 79 | 16 | 95 | 79 | 4 | 1 | 0 | 1 | 3 |
