= List of Hamilton Tigers head coaches =

Head Coaches of the Hamilton Tigers and the Quebec Bulldogs

as the Quebec Bulldogs:

- Charles Nolan 1910–12
- Joe Malone 1912–17
- Mike Quinn 1919–20 (as Quebec Athletics)

as the Hamilton Tigers:

- Percy Thompson 1920–22
- Art Ross 1922–23
- Ken Randall 1923–24
- Percy LeSueur 1924
- Jimmy Gardner 1924–25

== See also ==
- List of NHL head coaches
