= 1915–16 NHA season =

National Hockey Association season

- League: National Hockey Association
- Sport: Ice hockey
- Duration: December 18, 1915 – March 18, 1916
- Games: 24
- Teams: 5

Regular season
- Top scorer: Newsy Lalonde (28)

O'Brien Cup
- Champions: Montreal Canadiens

NHA seasons
- ← 1914–15 1916–17 →

The 1915–16 NHA season was the seventh season of the National Hockey Association. Five teams played a 24 game schedule. Montreal Canadiens won the league championship and defeated the Portland Rosebuds to win their first ever Stanley Cup.

== League business ==
Toronto Blueshirts included the players from the Toronto Shamrocks/Ontarios/Tecumsehs franchise. Before the season, Ed Livingstone, the Shamrocks owner, purchased the Blueshirts franchise from Frank Robinson. At the annual meeting of November 9, 1915, he was ordered to sell the Shamrocks franchise but could not do so as the Pacific Coast Hockey Association 'raided' the franchise and signed its players.

- Emmett Quinn continued as president
- Frank Calder continued as secretary-treasurer

Directors:

- Sam Lichtenhein, Ernie Russell, Wanderers
- E. J. Livingstone, Shamrocks
- Frank Robinson, M. J. Quinn, Toronto
- Barney Kane, Quebec
- George Kennedy, Canadiens
- Martin Rosenthal, Frank Shaughnessy, Ottawa

President Quinn instituted a rule that officials would be locked in their dressing rooms between periods to disallow influence from the press or players.

== Regular season ==
Several players from the PCHA signed with NHA clubs:

- Frank Nighbor, Ottawa
- Bert Lindsay, Wanderers
- Walter Smaill, Wanderers

=== Highlights ===
On January 23, 1916, Skene Ronan was arrested by Toronto police and charged with assault for hitting Alf Skinner.

On February 23, 1916, Gordon Roberts of the Wanderers drew a match penalty for cutting Ottawa's Frank Nighbor in a game in Montreal. On the next visit of the Wanderers to Ottawa, Roberts was pelted with bottles from the Ottawa fans.

The race for the scoring championship was close between Newsy Lalonde of the Canadiens, Joe Malone of Quebec and Cy Denneny of Toronto. Lalonde finished with 31 goals in 25 games and Malone and Denneny tied for second with 26 goals. Clint Benedict of Ottawa had the best G.A.A. of 3.0 to surpass Georges Vezina's 3.2 goals per game. Gordon Keats of Toronto scored five goals in a game against Quebec on February 7, 1916, and finished the season with 22 goals in 24 games.

=== Final standings ===
National Hockey Association
	GP	W	L	T	GF	GA
Montreal Canadiens	24	16	7	1	104	76
Ottawa Senators	24	13	11	0	78	72
Quebec Bulldogs	24	10	12	2	91	98
Montreal Wanderers	24	10	14	0	90	116
Toronto Hockey Club	24	9	14	1	97	98

Note: W = Wins, L = Losses, T = Ties, GF= Goals For, GA = Goals Against

Montreal was the O'Brien Cup champion by virtue of leading the league in its season.

=== Results ===
Month	Day	Visitor	Score	Home	Score
Dec.	18	Canadiens	2	Toronto	1
Dec.	18	Quebec	5	Wanderers	8
Dec.	22	Toronto	1	Ottawa	7
Dec.	22	Wanderers	3	Canadiens	2
Dec.	25	Ottawa	2	Quebec	3
Dec.	25	Wanderers	6	Toronto	5
Dec.	29	Ottawa	0	Wanderers	4
Dec.	29	Canadiens	2	Quebec	5
Jan.	1	Canadiens	4	Ottawa	2
Jan.	1	Quebec	4	Toronto	3
Jan.	5	Toronto	1	Canadiens	6
Jan.	5	Wanderers	1	Quebec	6
Jan.	8	Quebec	2	Ottawa	4
Jan.	8	Canadiens	3	Wanderers	5
Jan.	12	Ottawa	0	Toronto	1
Jan.	12	Quebec	3	Canadiens	5
Jan.	15	Ottawa	5	Canadiens	2
Jan.	15	Toronto	3	Quebec	4
Jan.	17	Wanderers	7	Ottawa	3
Jan.	19	Toronto	4	Wanderers	7
Jan.	19	Canadiens	2	Quebec	2 (OT 20')
Jan.	23	Canadiens	1	Toronto	3
Jan.	23	Quebec	2	Wanderers	1
Jan.	24	Ottawa	6	Quebec	3
Jan.	26	Toronto	1	Ottawa	2
Jan.	26	Wanderers	4	Canadiens	5
Jan.	29	Ottawa	5	Wanderers	4
Jan.	29	Toronto	5	Quebec	6 (OT 16'10")
Jan.	31	Wanderers	2	Toronto	8
Feb.	2	Quebec	0	Ottawa	4
Feb.	2	Wanderers	9	Canadiens	5
Feb.	5	Toronto	5	Canadiens	10
Feb.	5	Wanderers	5	Quebec	8
Feb.	7	Wanderers	1	Ottawa	3
Feb.	7	Quebec	5	Toronto	11
Feb.	9	Ottawa	2	Canadiens	3 (OT 7'20")
Feb.	9	Toronto	3	Quebec	3 (OT 20')
Feb.	12	Canadiens	3	Ottawa	1
Feb.	12	Toronto	1	Wanderers	3
Feb.	16	Ottawa	1	Toronto	3
Feb.	16	Quebec	3	Canadiens	4
Feb.	19	Toronto	2	Ottawa	5
Feb.	19	Wanderers	3	Canadiens	1
Feb.	23	Ottawa	4	Wanderers	3
Feb.	23	Canadiens	3	Quebec	2
Feb.	26	Ottawa	2	Toronto	9
Feb.	26	Quebec	3	Canadiens	4 (OT 15")
Feb.	28	Wanderers	2	Ottawa	6
Mar.	1	Wanderers	2	Quebec	6
Mar.	1	Toronto	3	Canadiens	7
Mar.	4	Canadiens	15	Wanderers	5
Mar.	4	Quebec	5	Toronto	7
Mar.	8	Quebec	5	Ottawa	8
Mar.	8	Toronto	3	Wanderers	2
Mar.	11	Ottawa	1	Canadiens	4
Mar.	11	Wanderers	2	Toronto	10
Mar.	13	Ottawa	4	Quebec	0
Mar.	15	Canadiens	5	Ottawa	1
Mar.	15	Quebec	6	Wanderers	1
Mar.	18	Canadiens	6	Toronto	4

== Player statistics ==
=== Scoring leaders ===
Note: GP = Games played, G = Goals scored, A = Assists, Pts = Points, PIM = Penalties in minutes

Name	Club	GP	G	A	Pts	PIM
Didier Pitre	Canadiens	24	24	15	39	42
Joe Malone	Quebec	24	25	10	35	21
Newsy Lalonde	Canadiens	24	28	6	34	78
Duke Keats	Toronto	24	22	7	29	112
Cy Denneny	Toronto	24	24	4	28	57
Gordon Roberts	Wanderers	21	18	7	25	64
Frank Nighbor	Ottawa	23	19	5	24	26
Corb Denneny	Toronto	22	20	3	23	75
Rusty Crawford	Quebec	22	18	5	23	54
Odie Cleghorn	Wanderers	21	15	7	22	51

=== Goaltending averages ===
Note: GP = Games played, GA = Goals against, SO = Shutouts, GAA = Goals against average

Name	Club	GP	GA	SO	GAA
Clint Benedict	Ottawa	24	72	1	3.0
Georges Vezina	Canadiens	24	76		3.2
Paddy Moran	Quebec	22	82		3.7
Percy LeSueur	Toronto	23	92	1	4.0
Bert Lindsay	Wanderers	23	110	1	4.8
Harry Holmes	Toronto	1	6		6.0
Billy Hague	Wanderers	1	6		6.0
Harry Rochon	Quebec	2	16		8.0

== Playoffs ==
The Canadiens hosted the Portland Rosebuds, champions of the Pacific Coast Hockey Association (PCHA), for the Stanley Cup.

=== Stanley Cup Final ===
Champions	Runners up	Format	Result
Montreal Canadiens	Portland Rosebuds	best of 5	3–2

== Exhibitions ==
After the Stanley Cup playoff, Portland and Montreal traveled to New York for two exhibition games. The teams then played two games in Cleveland. Montreal then traveled to Boston to play the winner of an exhibition series played between Ottawa, Quebec and the Wanderers.

== See also ==
- National Hockey Association
- List of pre-NHL seasons
- List of Stanley Cup champions
- 1915–16 PCHA season

Preceded by 1914–15 NHA season	NHA seasons 1915–16	Succeeded by 1916–17 NHA season
