= Henri Boivin =

Canadian ice hockey player

- Born: July 20, 1891 Canada
- Died: October 13, 1947 (aged 56)
- Position: Goaltender
- Played for: Quebec Bulldogs
- Playing career: 1912–1916

Joseph Philippe Henri Lorenzo Boivin (July 20, 1891 – October 13, 1947) was a Canadian professional ice hockey player. He played with the Quebec Bulldogs of the National Hockey Association.
