= Alf McDonald =

Alf McDonald may refer to:

- Alf McDonald (American football), college football player
- Alf McDonald (ice hockey) (1877–1956), Canadian ice hockey player
