= Gordon Trenouth =

Canadian ice hockey player

- Born: November 3, 1886 Broadview, Northwest Territories, Canada
- Died: June 8, 1956 (aged 69)
- Position: Defence
- Played for: Toronto Shamrocks; Toronto Blueshirts
- Playing career: 1908–1916

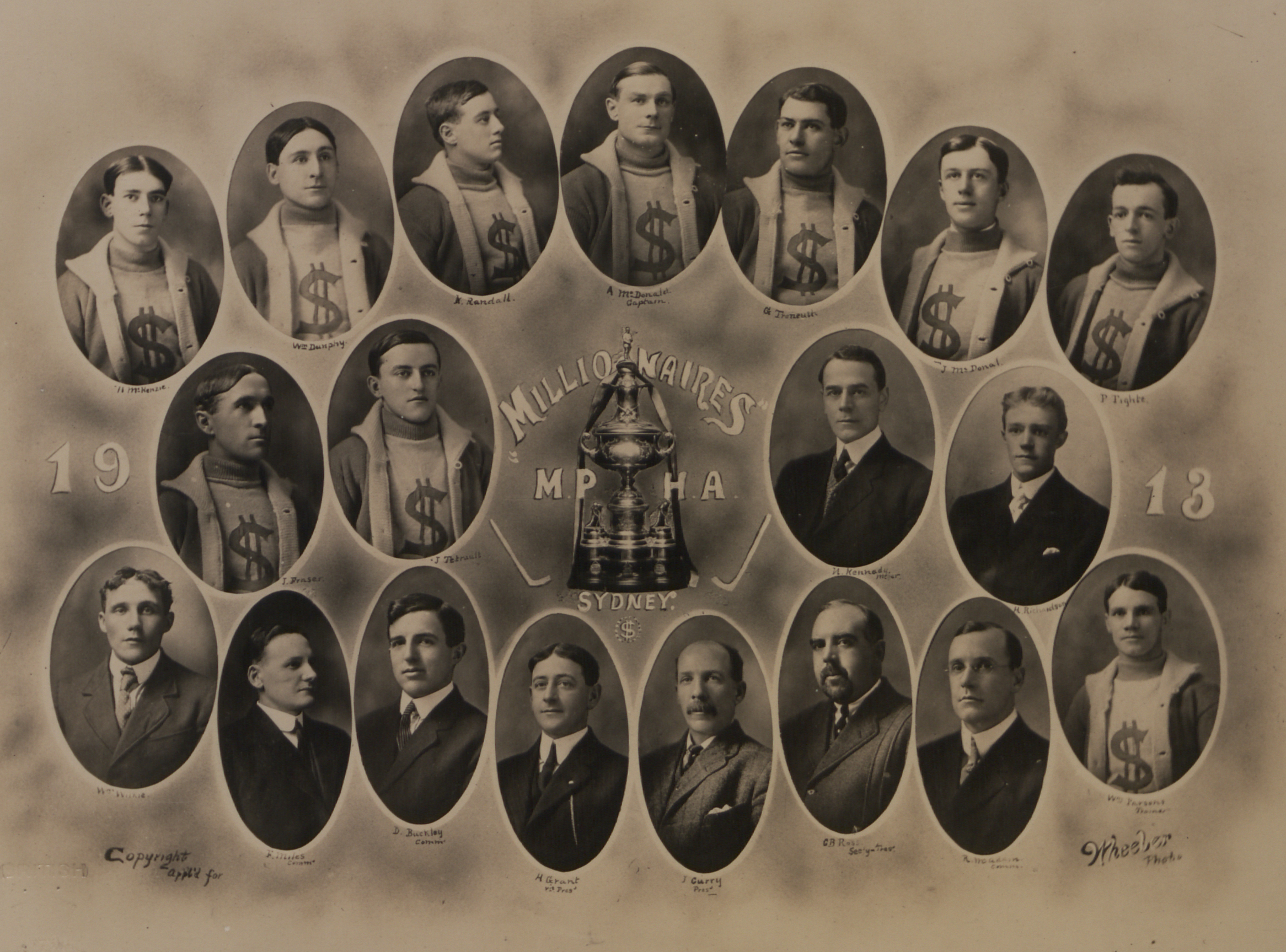
Trenouth, third from right in upper row, with 1913 Sydney Millionaires.

Gordon Stanley Trenouth (November 3, 1886 – June 8, 1956) was a Canadian professional ice hockey player. He played with the Toronto Shamrocks and the Toronto Blueshirts of the National Hockey Association.

He also played with the Sydney Millionaires in the Maritime Professional Hockey League.
