= Harry Rochon =

Canadian ice hockey player

- Born: July 21, 1882; Caledonia Springs, Ontario, Canada
- Died: April 22, 1921 (aged 38); Los Angeles, California, United States
- Height: 5 ft 3 in (160 cm)
- Weight: 132 lb (60 kg; 9 st 6 lb)
- Position: Goaltender
- Played for: Quebec Bulldogs
- Playing career: 1907–1916

Harry Elie Rochon (July 21, 1882 – April 22, 1921) was a Canadian professional ice hockey player. He played with the Quebec Bulldogs of the National Hockey Association.
