= Sarsfield Malone =

Canadian ice hockey player

- Born: March 8, 1886 Trois-Rivières, Quebec, Canada
- Died: February 26, 1942 (aged 55)
- Position: Defence
- Played for: Montreal Canadiens
- Playing career: 1904–1917

Joseph Sarsfield Malone (March 8, 1886 – February 26, 1942) was a Canadian professional ice hockey player. He played with the Montreal Canadiens of the National Hockey Association in the 1916–17 season. He is also referred to as Steve Malone in newspaper accounts.

Malone's sports career was cut short by the death of his father. He returned to Trois Rivieres to take over the family ship building business, which was renamed after him.

He was a brother of Foster Malone, and a second cousin of Joe and Jeff Malone.
