= Jack Ulrich =

Canadian ice hockey player (1890–1927)

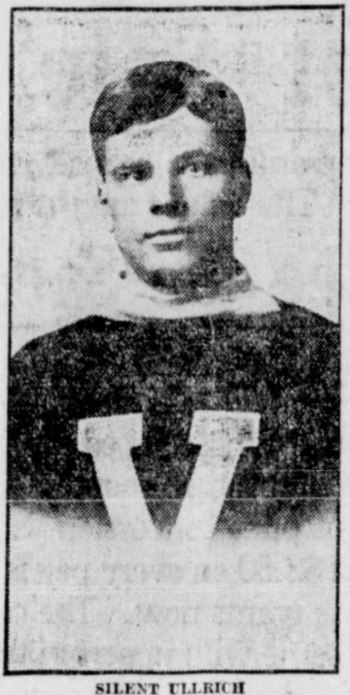
- Ulrich with the Vancouver Millionaires.
- Born: March 18, 1890 Kursk, Russian Empire
- Died: October 23, 1927 (aged 37) Detroit, Michigan
- Position: Right Wing
- Shot: Right
- Played for: Winnipeg Hockey Club; Vancouver Millionaires; Victoria Senators; Victoria Aristocrats; Montreal Wanderers; Toronto Blueshirts
- Playing career: 1912–1916

John Daniel "Jack, Silent" Ulrich (March 18, 1890 – October 23, 1927) was a Canadian professional ice hockey right winger. Ulrich, who was deaf-mute, played professionally with the Vancouver Millionaires and the Victoria Aristocrats in the Pacific Coast Hockey Association in 1912–1914. He also played for the Montreal Wanderers and the Toronto Blueshirts in the National Hockey Association in 1914–1916.

While in the professional hockey circuit Ulrich went by the nickname "Silent", or "Silent Jack". He detested being called by the more derogatory nickname "Dummy".

== Biography ==
Jack Ulrich was born in Kursk, Russia, but after his family had moved to Manitoba around the turn of the twentieth century he came up through the amateur hockey ranks in Winnipeg, where he first played at the Deaf and Dumb Institute (Manitoba School for the Deaf) on Portage Avenue, as a member of the M.S.D. team which won the Central Juvenile League championship in 1907. In 1909–10 he played with the Winnipeg Garrys in the city intermediate series, and one game with the Winnipeg Hockey Club of the Winnipeg Amateur Hockey League. In 1910–11 he appeared with the Winnipeg AAA:s in the city intermediate series.

At the Manitoba School for the Deaf, and with the Winnipeg Garrys, Ulrich was a teammate of fellow deaf-mute hockey player Walter Molisky who would go on to win the Allan Cup with the Regina Victorias in 1914.

Ulrich went professional on the Canadian West Coast in 1912 with the Vancouver Millionaires, tallying 4 goals in 3 PCHA games with the Millionaires.

For the 1912–13 season Millionaires manager Frank Patrick released Ulrich to Victoria, to make room for newly acquired forwards Cyclone Taylor, Carl Kendall and Jack McDonald. Victoria won the PCHA championship both in 1912–13 and 1913–14, with Ulrich as a substitute player. He also played in two unofficial Stanley Cup challenges with the Victoria Senators and Aristocrats, winning in 1913 against the Quebec Bulldogs and losing in 1914 against the Toronto Blueshirts.

During the 1914–15 and 1915–16 NHA seasons Ulrich played as a substitute for the Montreal Wanderers, and also appeared in three games with the Toronto Blueshirts during the 1915–16 NHA campaign.

Ulrich retired from hockey in 1916 due to injuries and the same year he married Mabel Agnes McKenzie of Montreal in Toronto. Ulrich died in Detroit, Michigan in 1927 of acute appendicitis.

== Playing style ==
"He is a magnificent stickhandler and possesses a grand shot from either side. He is heavily handicapped because he cannot hear or speak, but his individual work is equal to the best. Ulrich is noted as being a back checker without an equal, and his acquisition by the Victoria hockey squad means the strengthening of the Senators."

— Victoria Daily Times on Ulrich at the beginning of the 1912–13 season.

"What do you mean by writing in the paper that I have to depend on Mr. Patrick for directions while in the game. I never depend on him, except his signals for me to go to the bench or come on the ice."

— Ulrich in a letter to the sporting editor of the Toronto World at the end of the 1913–14 season.

Ulrich, a right winger and a right-hand shot, was noted as a strong skater and an adept stick-handler who could shoot well from either side, and he was also hailed in the local newspaper the Victoria Daily Times as one of the better back checkers in the game at the beginning of the 1912–13 season.

While Ulrich communicated with a pencil and a notepad off the ice he claimed himself that he took no instructions from Victoria Senators and Victoria Aristocrats coach Lester Patrick on how to play while on the ice, and only answered to signals regarding him going on and off the ice.

== Statistics ==
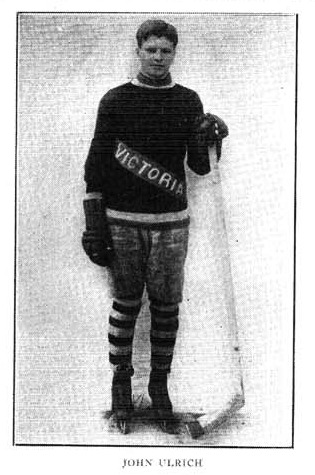
Ulrich with the Victoria Aristocrats.

			Regular season					Playoffs
Season	Team	League	GP	G	A	Pts	PIM	GP	G	A	Pts	PIM
1909–10	Winnipeg Hockey Club	WpgAHL	1	0	0	0	0	—	—	—	—	—
1910–11	Winnipeg AAA	MbIHL	1	0	0	0	0	—	—	—	—	—
1912	Vancouver Millionaires	PCHA	3	4	0	4	6	—	—	—	—	—
1912–13	Victoria Senators	PCHA	5	2	1	3	0	—	—	—	—	—
		Stanley Cup	—	—	—	—	—	3	0	0	0	0
1913–14	Victoria Aristocrats	PCHA	9	2	0	2	0	—	—	—	—	—
		Stanley Cup	—	—	—	—	—	3	0	0	0	0
1914–15	Montreal Wanderers	NHA	9	3	0	3	12	2	0	0	0	0
1915–16	Montreal Wanderers	NHA	14	1	0	1	6	—	—	—	—	—
	Toronto Blueshirts	NHA	3	1	1	2	9	—	—	—	—	—
PCHA totals			17	8	1	9	6	—	—	—	—	—
NHA totals			26	5	1	6	27	2	0	0	0	0
