= Quebec Arena =

Ice hockey arena in Quebec, Canada

- Interactive map of Quebec Arena
- Location: Quebec City, Quebec, Canada
- Coordinates: 46°49′0″N 71°13′51″W
- Owner: Dussault group
- Operator: Dussault group
- Capacity: 6,000

Construction
- Opened: 1913
- Closed: 1942

Tenants
- Quebec Bulldogs (NHA and NHL)

Quebec Arena was an indoor ice hockey arena in Quebec City, Quebec. It was built in 1913 and was the home of the Quebec Bulldogs of the NHA and NHL until the team moved to Hamilton, Ontario in 1920. It was located at Victoria Park. It burned down in 1942.

== History ==
In 1913, after their second Stanley Cup win in the old Quebec Skating Rink, the Quebec Hockey Club proposed to build a new facility. With the support of Quebec City Council, a new arena was built in Victoria Park by a group headed by Joseph-Etienne Dussault. The 6,000 seat venue opened for its first game in December 1913.

| Preceded by Quebec Skating Rink | Home of the Quebec Bulldogs; 1913 – 1920 | Succeeded by Barton Street Arena (as Hamilton Tigers) |
