= George Broughton (ice hockey) =

Canadian ice hockey player (1888–1956)

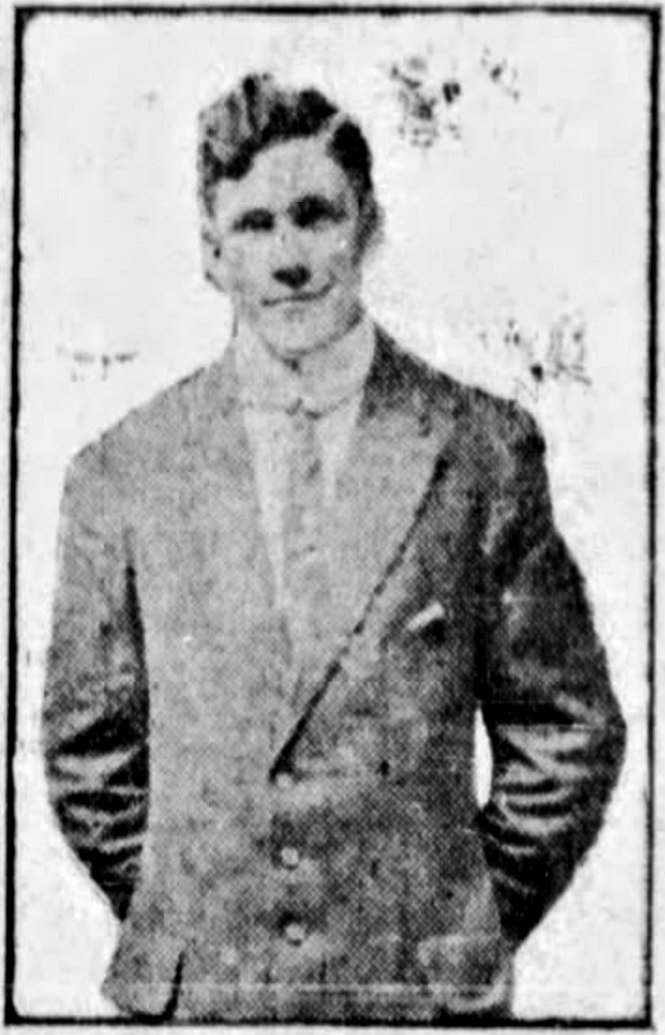
- Broughton, c. 1912
- Born: January 7, 1888; Montreal, Canada
- Died: August 5, 1956 (aged 68); Montreal, Canada
- Height: 5 ft 9 in (175 cm)
- Weight: 180 lb (82 kg; 12 st 12 lb)
- Position: Goaltender
- Caught: Left
- Played for: Montreal Shamrocks; Montreal Wanderers
- Playing career: 1903–1915

George Thompson Broughton (January 7, 1888 – August 5, 1956) was a Canadian professional ice hockey player. He played as a goaltender with the Montreal Shamrocks (1910) and Montreal Wanderers (1911–12) of the National Hockey Association.

He is buried at Mount Royal Cemetery in Montreal.
