= Foster Malone =

Canadian ice hockey player

- Born: December 30, 1887 Trois-Rivières, Quebec, Canada
- Died: February 14, 1926 (aged 38)
- Height: 5 ft 7 in (170 cm)
- Weight: 150 lb (68 kg; 10 st 10 lb)
- Position: Centre
- Shot: Right
- Played for: Toronto Blueshirts; Montreal Canadiens
- Playing career: 1905–1918

Joseph Foster Malone (December 30, 1887 – February 14, 1926) was a Canadian professional ice hockey player. He played with the Toronto Blueshirts and the Montreal Canadiens of the National Hockey Association.

He was a brother of Sarsfield Malone, and a second cousin of Joe and Jeff Malone.
