= Alf McDonald (ice hockey) =

Canadian ice hockey player

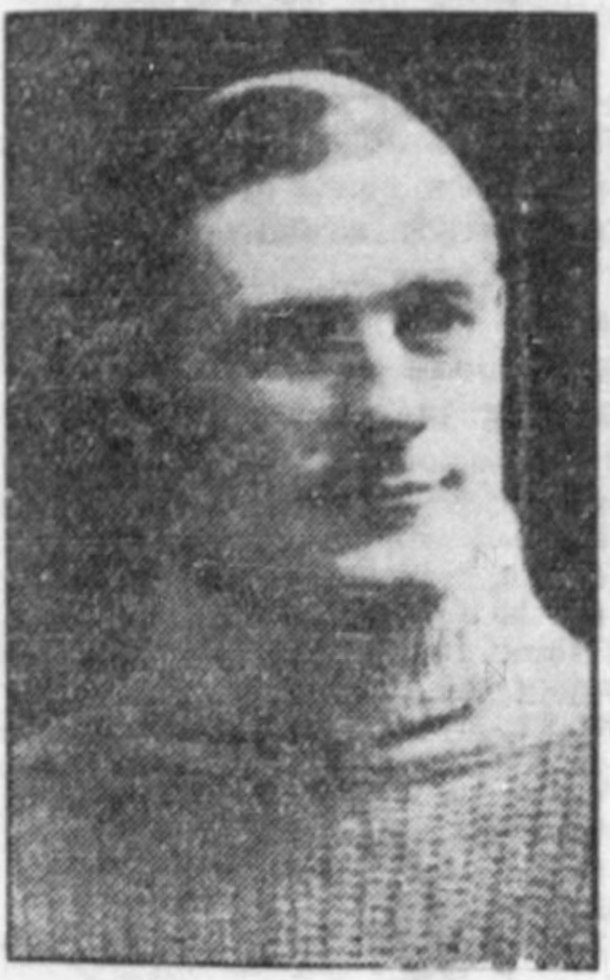
- McDonald with Brantford Indians in 1908–09
- Born: September 17, 1877 Mattawa, Ontario, Canada
- Died: May 1, 1956 (aged 78) Ottawa, Ontario, Canada
- Position: Defence
- Played for: Montreal Wanderers; Toronto Pros; Sydney Millionaires

Alfred Ernest 'Cap' McDonald (September 17, 1877 – May 1, 1956) was a Canadian professional ice hockey player who played from 1895 to 1914. In 1912–13, he was the captain and coach of the Sydney Millionaires when they played against the Quebec Bulldogs for the Stanley Cup in 1913.

== Biography ==
McDonald was from the village of Iroquois, Ontario, and was the son of the Village Chief of Police, William McDonald. He left home at an early age in 1896 to play for the Smiths Falls Hockey Club until 1902, his time there briefly interrupted in 1898 when he played for Brockville.

It was during this period, on March 27, 1899, that Alfred broke the world record for high jumping on skates, having leaped 42 & ½ inches high.

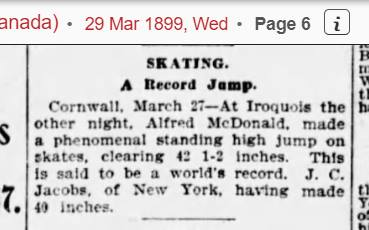

As with most early professional hockey players, he moved often from team to team within Canada and the United States. Players were paid by the game, or by the hockey season. Often players, termed "ringers", were hired to play specific games or series of games when teams were vying for championships in their league.

At that time, hockey was played with six men on the ice in addition to a goalkeeper. McDonald, noted to be a tall and husky person, played all positions except goalkeeper during his long hockey career. He was particularly effective at the 'point' and 'cover-point' positions which evolved in to the 'defenceman' position of modern style of hockey.

During this era, teams based in Canada did not pay their hockey players. Rather, the hockey town provided off-ice jobs and other perks. It wasn't until the formation of the Ontario Professional Hockey League (OPHL) in 1908 that professional hockey arrived in Canada.

The world's first professional hockey leagues, which operated simultaneously, were the Western Pennsylvania Hockey League (WPHL) and the International Professional Hockey League (IPHL), which started in 1902 and 1904 respectively, and McDonald moved to the United States to play in both leagues.

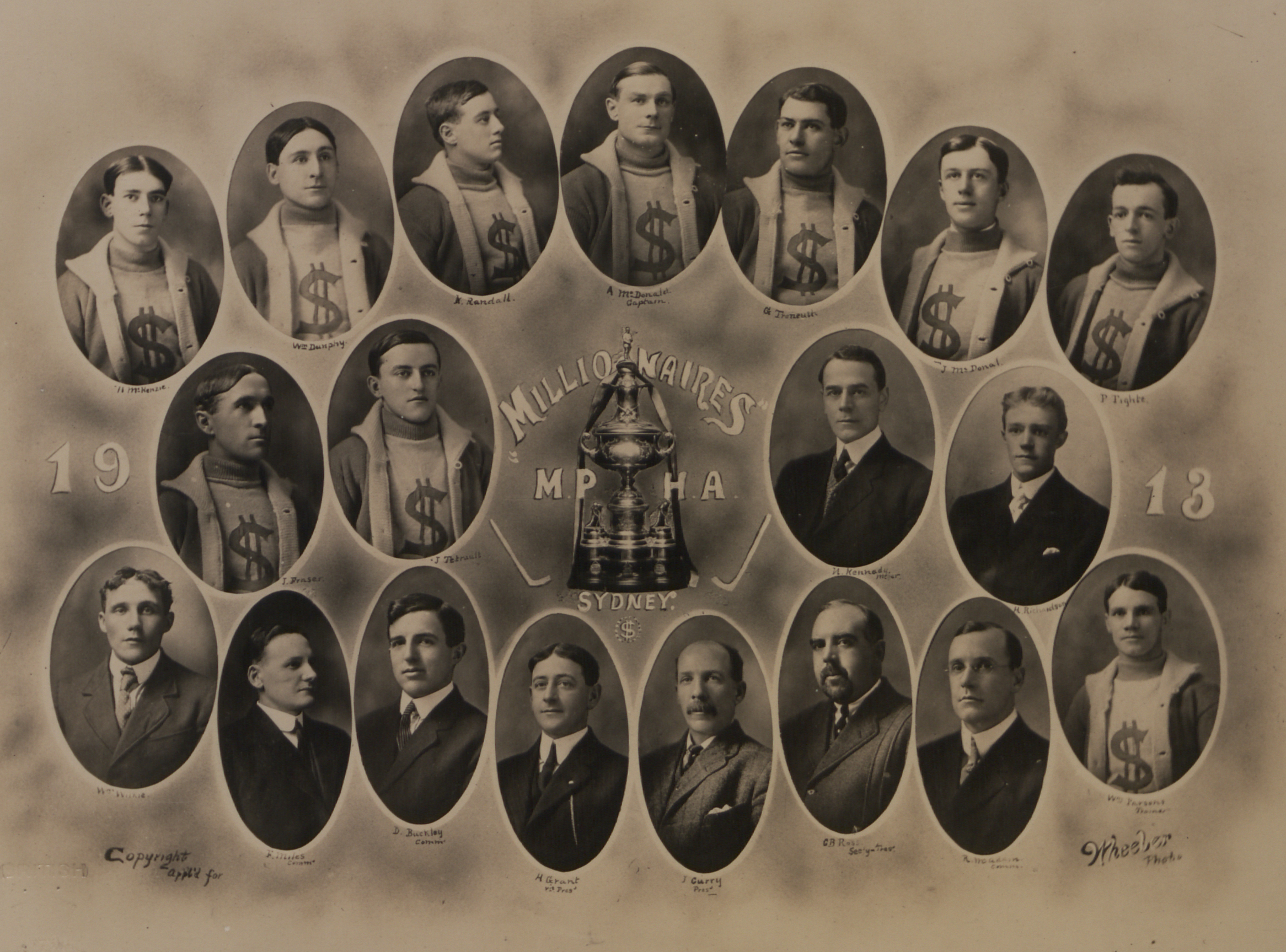
McDonald, in the middle of the upper row, with the Sydney Millionaires in 1913.

Many good Canadian hockey players were lured down to play in both the WPHL and the IPHL. Players were provided with accommodation and transportation and paid on average US$30 per game, equivalent to $1,090 in 2024.

Between 1905 and 1909, McDonald moved from team to team in the IPHL and WPHL. Players were paid on an individual contract per game in most instances. The Calumet Miners (1905–1907), Pittsburgh Bankers (1907–1908), and the Pittsburgh Lyceum (1907–09) were the three main teams that McDonald rotated in and out of player contracts with.

When the OPHL formed in 1908, professional hockey was gaining popularity in Canadian cities and many of the Canadian players in the WPHL and IPHL returned to Canada to play. McDonald was one of the players who was brought up from the United States to play for the famed Toronto Professionals in 1908. This is considered the first iteration of the current NHL team, the Toronto Maple Leafs.

By the 1908–09 season, McDonald was playing for the Brantford Braves (also known as the Brantford Indians) and it was with this team that he played three full seasons.

In two of his three last years of playing professional hockey he was the captain of the Sydney Millionaires in the Maritime Professional Hockey League (MPHL).

== List of teams that Alfred 'Cap' McDonald played for ==
Cap’ played in three amateur hockey leagues:

1896-1900 Iroquois Indians Hockey Club Ontario Hockey Association Seniors (OHAS)

1901-1902 Smith’s Falls Hockey Club Upper Ottawa Valley Hockey League (UOVHL)

1902-1903 Smith’s Falls Hockey Club OHAS

1903-1904 Smith’s Falls Hockey Club OHAS

1903-1904 Brockville Hockey Club OHAS

1905-1906 Cornwall Hockey Club Federal Hockey League (FHL)

In 1905 Cap decided to become a professional hockey player, however there were no professional teams in Canada, so he went to the United States.

He played on the following professional teams and leagues:

1905-1906 Michigan Soo Indians International Hockey League (IHL)

1905-1906 Calumet Miners IHL 1906-1907 Calumet Miners IHL

1907-1908 Pittsburgh Lyceum Western Professional Hockey League (WPHL)

1907-1908 Pittsburgh Bankers WPHL

1907-1908 Brantford Indians Ontario Professional Hockey League (OPHL)

1908-1909 Brantford Indians OPHL

1908-1909 Pittsburgh Lyceum WPHL

1908-1909 Toronto Professionals OPHL

1909-1910 Waterloo Colts OPHL

1909-1910 Galt Professionals OPHL

1910 Galt Professionals OPHL – Stanley Cup Challenge against Ottawa Senators

1910-1911 Belleville Eastern Ontario Professional Hockey League (EOPHL)

1910-1911 Brantford Indians OPHL

1911-1912 Montreal Shamrocks Interprovincial Amateur Hockey Union (IAHU)

1912-1913 Montreal St. Pats IAHU

1912-1913 Sydney Millionaires MPHL

1913 Sydney Millionaires MPHL – Stanley Cup Challenge against Quebec Bulldogs

1913-1914 Montreal Wanderers National Hockey Association NHA
