= Quebec Skating Rink =

Indoor skating rink in Quebec, Canada

Coordinates: 46°48′29″N 71°12′45″W

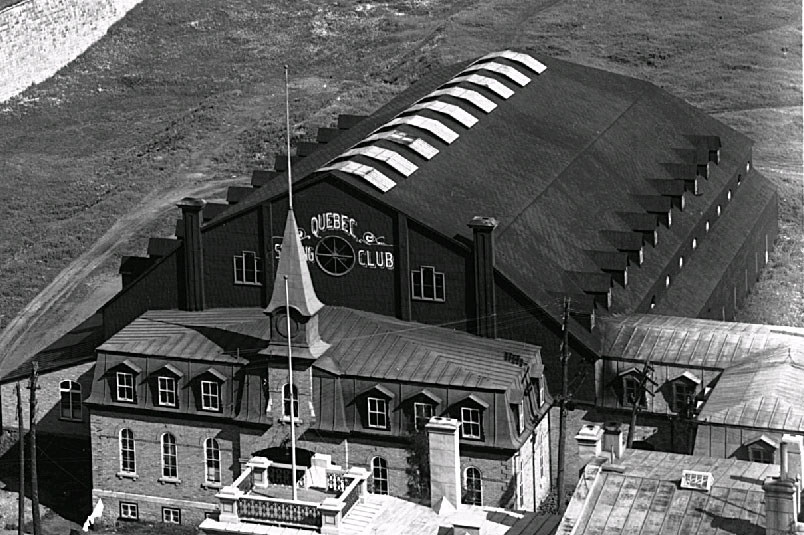
- View from Parliament Buildings, 1908
- Interactive map of Quebec Skating Rink
- Full name: Quebec Skating Rink
- Location: Quebec City, Quebec, Canada
- Owner: Quebec Skating Club
- Capacity: 1,400 seated, 3,500 standing (1891– )
- Surface: 180 by 70 feet (55 m × 21 m) (natural ice)

Construction
- Built: 1851 (1st); 1864 (2nd); 1877 (3rd); 1891 (4th)
- Opened: 1851
- Expanded: 1891
- Closed: 1918

Tenant
- Quebec Hockey Club (Bulldogs)

Quebec Skating Rink was the name of several ice rinks in Quebec City, Quebec. The first was built in 1851, near the St. Lawrence River. It was the world's first covered skating rink. The second rink, built in 1864, was situated on the Grande-Allée, as were the third and fourth rinks. The rinks were developed initially for ice skating, but the developing sport of ice hockey led to the inauguration of the Quebec Hockey Club in the 1880s, which used the rink as their home. The hockey club moved to the new, larger Quebec Arena in 1913.

== History ==
The first, opened in 1851 or 1852, was the first covered skating rink in the world. It was located at Queen’s Wharf along Boulevard Champlain (now Canadian Coast Guard Station Quebec) near the St. Lawrence River. The second rink opened in 1864. It was located on the north side of the Grande-Allée, in front of the parliament building.

The third rink opened in December 1877, was located again on the same side of the Grand-Allée, but next to the Saint-Louis gate. It was designed by William Tutin Thomas, the son of William Thomas. It was dismantled in 1889, for plans were made to transfer the rink on the other side of the Grande-Allée, but management problems caused important delays. An attempt to build a temporary structure in 1890 led to total failure. Built in haste, the building collapsed on itself on January 21.

The fourth rink was constructed on the south side of the Grande-Allée in 1892. It would host the two Stanley Cup victories of the Quebec Hockey Club (by then known as the Bulldogs) in 1912 and 1913. The rink was located at the entrance to the Plains of Abraham park. The fourth rink was destroyed by fire in 1918.

In 1913, after the second Stanley Cup win, the Quebec Hockey Club proposed to build a new facility. With support of Quebec City Council, a new arena was built in Victoria Park by a group headed by Joseph-Etienne Dussualt. The 6,000 seat venue, known as Quebec Arena was built in time for its first game in December 1913. The Quebec Skating Rink, already scheduled for demolition, was destroyed by fire in October 1918.

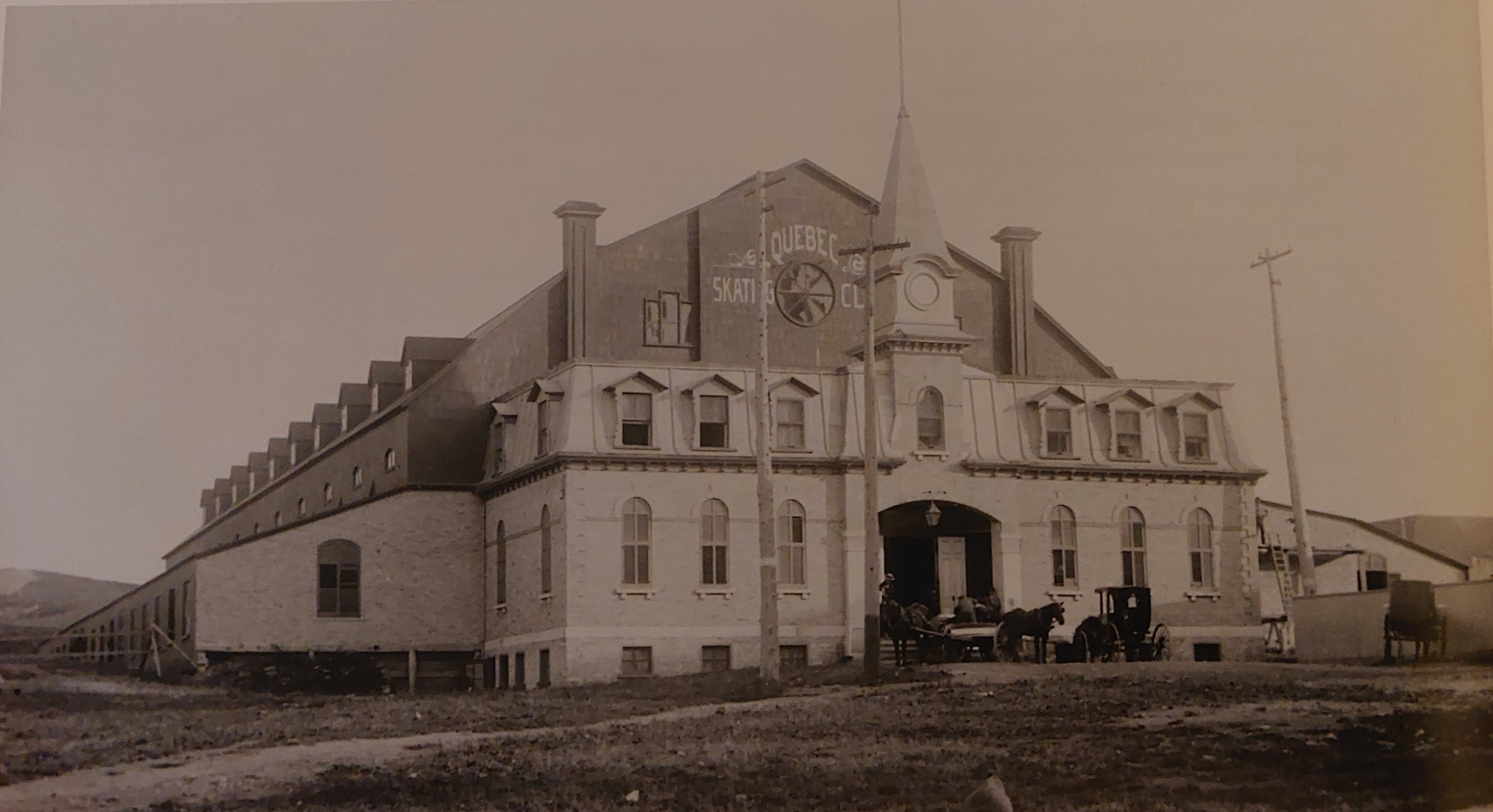
Exterior view

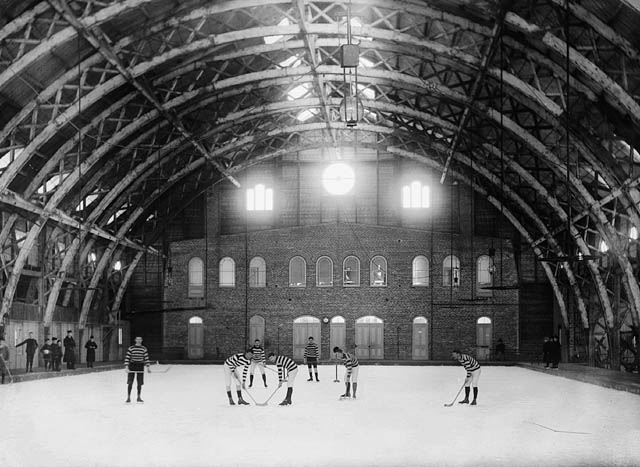
Interior view

== See also ==
- Quebec Bulldogs

Preceded by first arena	Home of the Quebec Bulldogs; 1881 – 1913	Succeeded by Quebec Arena
