= Jack Grannary =

Canadian ice hockey player

- Born: February 14, 1884; Montreal, Quebec, Canada
- Died: June 30, 1928 (aged 44)
- Position: Forward
- Played for: Quebec Hockey Club
- Playing career: 1901–1912

John Grannary, also spelled Grannery, (February 14, 1884 – June 30, 1928) was a Canadian professional ice hockey player. He played with the Quebec Hockey Club of the National Hockey Association from the 1909–10 season through to the 1911–12 season. Grannary won the Stanley Cup with Quebec in 1912
