= Bobby Genge =

Canadian ice hockey player

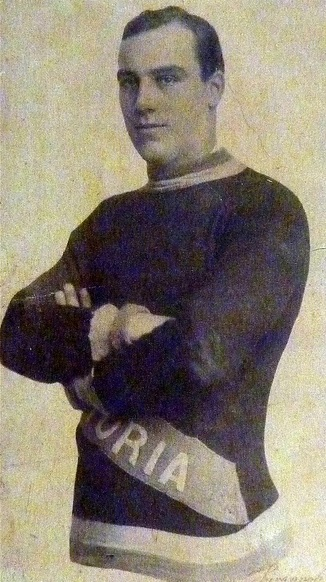
- Born: December 20, 1889 Leeds County, Ontario, Canada
- Died: September 20, 1937 (aged 47) Vancouver, British Columbia, Canada
- Height: 6 ft 4 in (193 cm)
- Weight: 200 lb (91 kg; 14 st 4 lb)
- Position: Defence
- Shot: Left
- Played for: Victoria Aristocrats; Spokane Canaries
- Playing career: 1912–1921

Robert Allan Genge (December 20, 1889 – September 20, 1937) was a Canadian professional ice hockey player. As a defenceman, he played with the Victoria Aristocrats and briefly the Spokane Canaries of the Pacific Coast Hockey Association from 1912 to 1921. Large in stature, Genge was known as a "dominating two-way player". He died from sepsis at Vancouver in 1937, aged 47.
