= Joe Tetreault =

Canadian ice hockey player

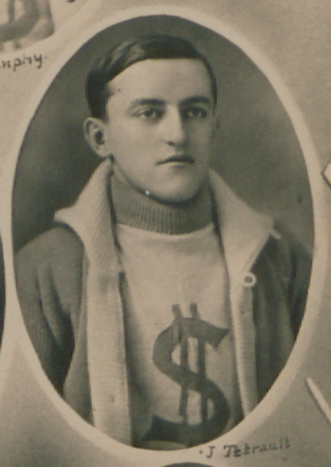
- With the Sydney Millionaires, c. 1913
- Born: July 10, 1892; Montreal, Quebec, Canada
- Died: September 11, 1938 (aged 46); Montreal, Quebec, Canada
- Weight: 126 lb (57 kg; 9 st 0 lb)
- Position: Left wing
- Shot: Left
- Played for: Montreal Wanderers; Toronto Shamrocks; Sydney Millionaires
- Playing career: 1905–1918

Felix Joseph Aime Tetreault (b. July 10, 1892 – d. September 11, 1938) was a Canadian professional ice hockey player. In the National Hockey Association, he played with the Montreal Wanderers for one game in 1911–12 and in the 1916–17 season. He also played a two-game stint with the Toronto Shamrocks in the 1914–15 season. He previously played with the Sydney Millionaires of the Maritime Professional Hockey League from 1912 to 1914.
