= Bert Cadotte =

Canadian ice hockey player

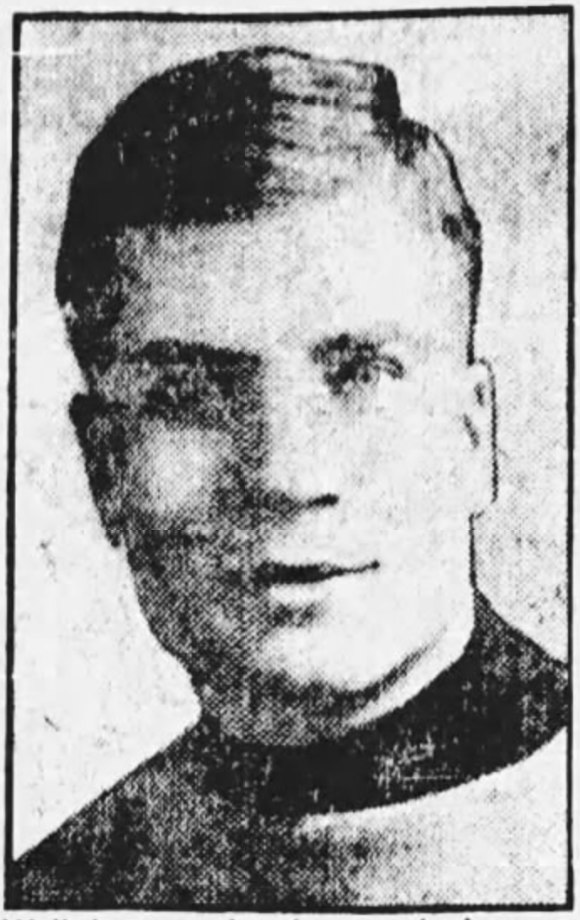
- Born: January 3, 1891 Montreal, Quebec, Canada
- Died: August 10, 1918 (aged 27) Amiens, France
- Height: 5 ft 5 in (165 cm)
- Weight: 148 lb (67 kg; 10 st 8 lb)
- Position: Goaltender
- Shot: Left
- Played for: Montreal Wanderers
- Playing career: 1906–1913

Joseph Alphonse Albert Cadotte (January 3, 1891 – August 10, 1918) was a Canadian professional ice hockey player. He played with the Montreal Wanderers of the National Hockey Association. He appeared in 6 games for the Wanderers in the 1912–13 season. On August 10, 1918, Cadotte was killed in action in the Battle of Amiens.
