= Walter Smaill =

Canadian ice hockey player

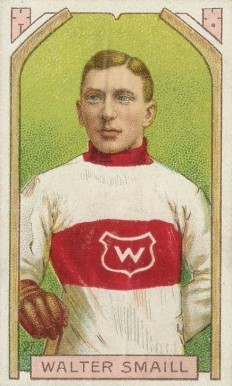
- Smaill with the Montreal Wanderers.
- Born: December 18, 1884 Montreal, Quebec, Canada
- Died: March 2, 1971 (aged 86) Montreal, Quebec, Canada
- Height: 5 ft 10 in (178 cm)
- Weight: 180 lb (82 kg; 12 st 12 lb)
- Position: Left wing
- Shot: Left
- Played for: Cobalt Silver Kings; Ottawa Senators; Victoria Aristocrats; Montreal Wanderers
- Playing career: 1903–1918

Walter Sydney Smaill (December 18, 1884 – March 2, 1971) was a Canadian professional ice hockey player who played 137 games in various professional and amateur leagues, including the National Hockey Association, Eastern Canada Amateur Hockey Association, and Pacific Coast Hockey Association.

== Playing career ==
Amongst the teams Smaill played for were the Cobalt Silver Kings, Ottawa Senators, Victoria Aristocrats, and Montreal Wanderers. He won the Stanley Cup with the Montreal Wanderers in 1907 and 1908.

On Dominion Day 1909 Smaill narrowly escaped a similar death to that which befell his former teammate on the Montreal Wanderers Hod Stuart two years prior in 1907. Smaill dove into shallow water outside the Cartierville neighborhood in Montreal to recover a pair of glasses which had been dropped from a boat. When he came up to the surface his face was covered with blood and he was badly stunned.

== Deployment and playing style ==
Smaill was a useful utility player. Outside of the forward left wing position he was also occasionally used as a cover-point (offensive defenceman) because of his strong rushing ability.

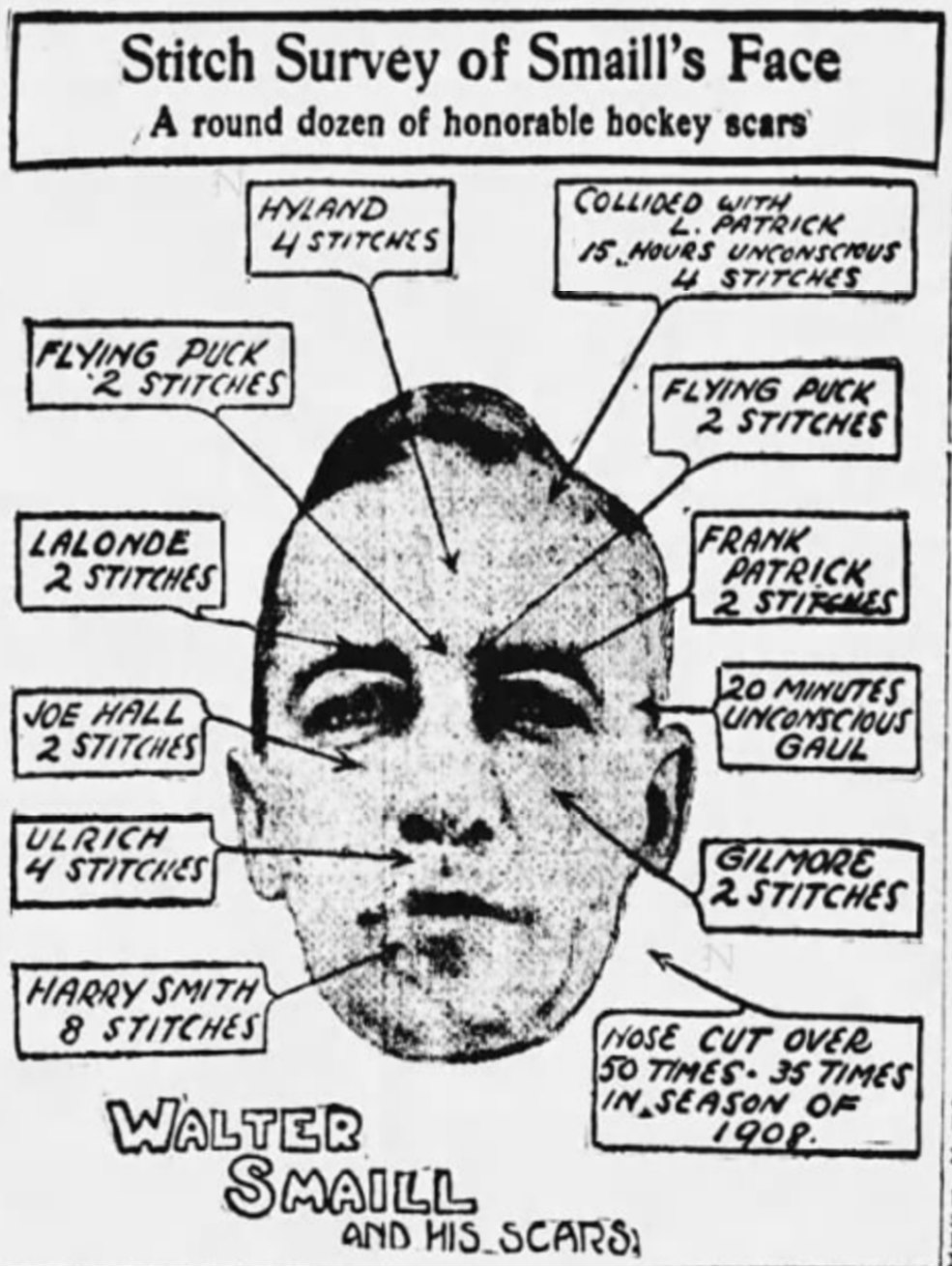

Smaill did not shy away from the physical aspects of the game, which earned him quite many whacks and hacks in his face over the years as an amateur and professional hockey player. The January 22, 1918, issue of The Province newspaper in Vancouver ran a story on Smaill where he was crowned the "Stitch Champion of Hockey", for his badly battered countenance and many stitches to his face. The article referenced an informal survey among Montreal hockey players that had taken place just a few years prior, where Smaill had been the overwhelming answer to the question "who is the worst battered man playing hockey?" An attached stitch map in the newspaper of Smaill's face revealed how he had received bad cuts from all of Harry Hyland, Newsy Lalonde, Joe Hall, Jack Ulrich, Harry Smith and Frank Patrick, as well as from multiple flying pucks. He had also been rendered unconscious for 15 hours after a collision with Lester Patrick, and for 20 minutes in another instance after having been knocked out by Horace Gaul.

== Death ==
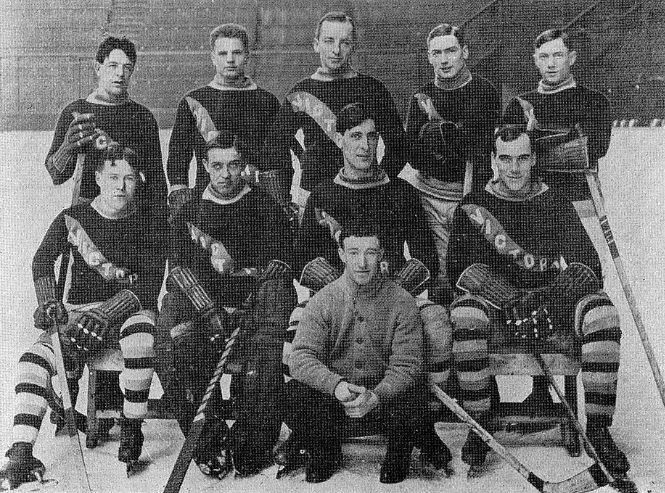
Smaill, in the middle in the back row, with the Victoria Aristocrats.

Smaill died at Montreal General Hospital on March 2, 1971, aged 86. He was buried at Mount Royal Cemetery in the Outremont borough of Montreal.
