= Billy Creighton =

Canadian ice hockey player (1892 - 1970)

- Creighton as a Quebec Bulldog in 1913
- Born: July 13, 1892; Kenora, Ontario, Canada
- Died: February 2, 1970 (aged 77)
- Height: 5 ft 7 in (170 cm)
- Weight: 160 lb (73 kg; 11 st 6 lb)
- Position: Left wing/Point
- Shot: Left
- Played for: Quebec Bulldogs; Montreal Canadiens
- Playing career: 1910–1928

William David Creighton (July 13, 1892 – February 2, 1970) was a professional ice hockey player from Kenora, Ontario. He played left wing, and point (defence) for the Quebec Bulldogs. In 1912–13 he helped Quebec win the Stanley Cup, as a substitute player. He played four games with the Montreal Canadiens in 1917 before joining the Toronto Blueshirts. In the Canadiens records, he is referred to as Dave Creighton.
