= Walter Rooney (footballer) =

English footballer

Personal information
- Full name: Walter Francis Rooney
- Date of birth: 31 March 1902
- Place of birth: Liverpool, England
- Date of death: 1963 (aged 60–61)
- Position: Wing half

Senior career*
Years	Team	Apps	(Gls)
1924–1929	Everton	14	(0)
1929–1930	Wrexham	12	(0)
- Runcorn
- Northwich Victoria
- * Club domestic league appearances and goals

Walter Francis Rooney (31 March 1902 – 1963) was an English professional footballer who played as a wing half. He made appearances in the English Football League for Everton and Wrexham.
