= George Leonard (ice hockey) =

Canadian ice hockey player

- Born: August 27, 1886; Quebec City, Quebec, Canada
- Died: August 21, 1917 (aged 30); Vimy, Pas-de-Calais, France
- Height: 5 ft 8 in (173 cm)
- Weight: 150 lb (68 kg; 10 st 10 lb)
- Position: Right wing
- Played for: Quebec Bulldogs
- Playing career: 1904–1917

George Arthur Joseph Leonard (August 27, 1886 – August 21, 1917) was a Canadian professional ice hockey player. He played with the Quebec Bulldogs of the National Hockey Association and was with the Bulldogs when they won the 1912 Stanley Cup.

He died during combat in World War I.
