= Jeff Malone (ice hockey) =

Canadian ice hockey player

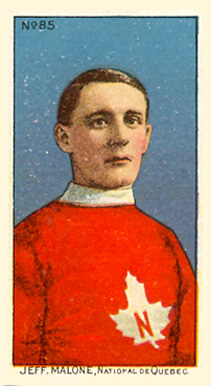
- Born: March 17, 1888 Quebec City, Quebec, Canada
- Died: March 22, 1981 (aged 93)
- Position: Defence
- Played for: Quebec Bulldogs; Montreal Wanderers
- Playing career: 1907–1914

Patrick Jeffrey Elias Malone (March 17, 1888 – March 22, 1981) was a Canadian professional ice hockey player. Malone played for the Montreal Wanderers and the Quebec Bulldogs as a spare player. He was the older brother of the more famous Joe Malone, who is a member of the Hockey Hall of Fame. Jeff won the Stanley Cup with his brother in 1913 playing as a spare center for Quebec. He was likely the last living member of the Bulldogs.

His nephew Cliff Malone played three games in the National Hockey League for the Montreal Canadiens during the 1951–52 season.

He was a second cousin of Sarsfield and Foster Malone who played briefly in the NHA.
