= Sydney Millionaires (MaPHL) =

Canadian professional ice hockey team

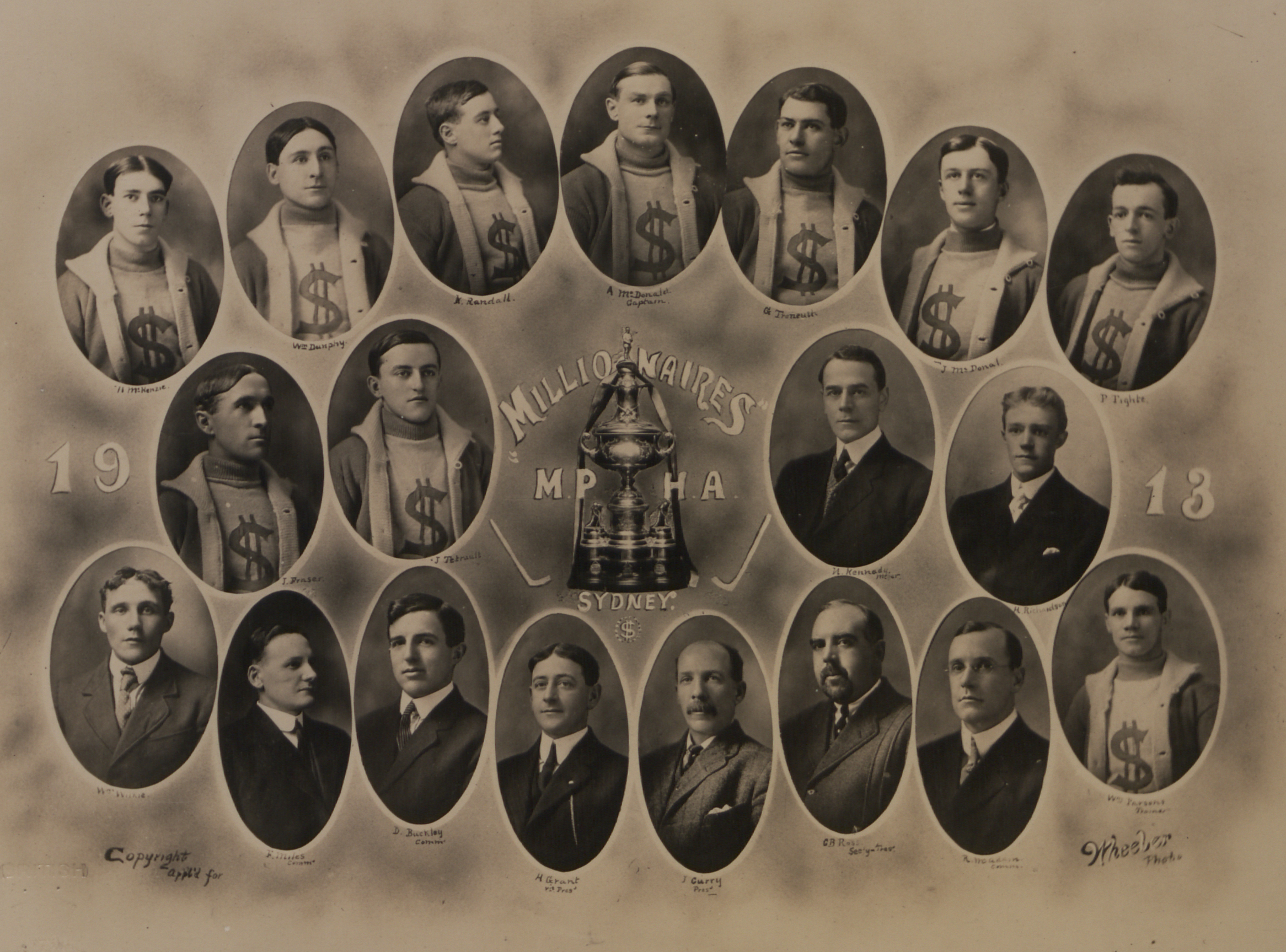
1913 team photograph

The Sydney Millionaires were an early Canadian professional ice hockey team located in Sydney, Nova Scotia that challenged for the Stanley Cup in 1913.

== History ==
Sydney joined the Maritime Professional Hockey League (MaPHL) for the 1912–13 season. The team won the league title and challenged for the Stanley Cup against the Quebec Bulldogs.

The Team Captain in 1913-14, Alfred 'Cap' McDonald, joined the team towards the end of his hockey career. He started playing professional hockey in 1895 and during the off season played professional baseball and lacrosse. Multi-athletics was common at that time as salaries were too modest to play only one sport. The Sydney Millionaires played against the Quebec Bulldogs over two games, sudden death, on March 8 and 10, and 'Cap' McDonald stated that they were very rough games. Sydney lost both: 14-3 and 6-2. This was the last time a professional team from the Maritimes challenged for the Stanley Cup.

The following year, and the last playing year for 'Cap' McDonald, he played for the Montreal Wanderers with the legendary Art Ross as his line-mate.

The team won the league title in the 1914 season, but did not challenge the Toronto Blueshirts for the Cup. The MaPHL folded and the Eastern Professional Hockey League was organized for the 1914–15 season. The team was in third and last place when the league folded.

The team name was resurrected in 1922 for a new senior team, which played for two Allan Cup national titles. The name was also used for a junior team, which started up in 1949. The name was used for various other Cape Breton leagues.

=== 1913 challenge ===
Joe Malone made a try for Frank McGee's record, but fell short at 9 goals. He was not in the lineup for the second game.

March 8, 1913
Sydney	3	at	Quebec	14
Toby McDonald		G	Paddy Moran
Gordon Trenouth	1	P	Joe Hall
Alf McDonald Capt.		CP	Harry Mummery	1
Ken Randall	1	F	Joe Malone Capt.	9
Bill Dunphy		F	Tommy Smith	3
Jim Fraser		F	Rusty Crawford
Joe Tetreault	1	sub	Billy Creighton	1

March 10, 1913
Sydney	2	at	Quebec	6
Toby McDonald		G	Paddy Moran
George Trenouth	1	P	Joe Hall	3
Alf McDonald Capt.		CP	Harry Mummery
Ken Randall		F	Tommy Smith	1
Bill Dunphy		F	Jack Marks	2
Jim Fraser		F	Billy Creighton
James Wilkie	1	sub

Quebec wins series 20–5

== Notable players ==
- Ken Randall - went on to play in the National Hockey Association and National Hockey League
