= Art Boyce =

Canadian ice hockey player

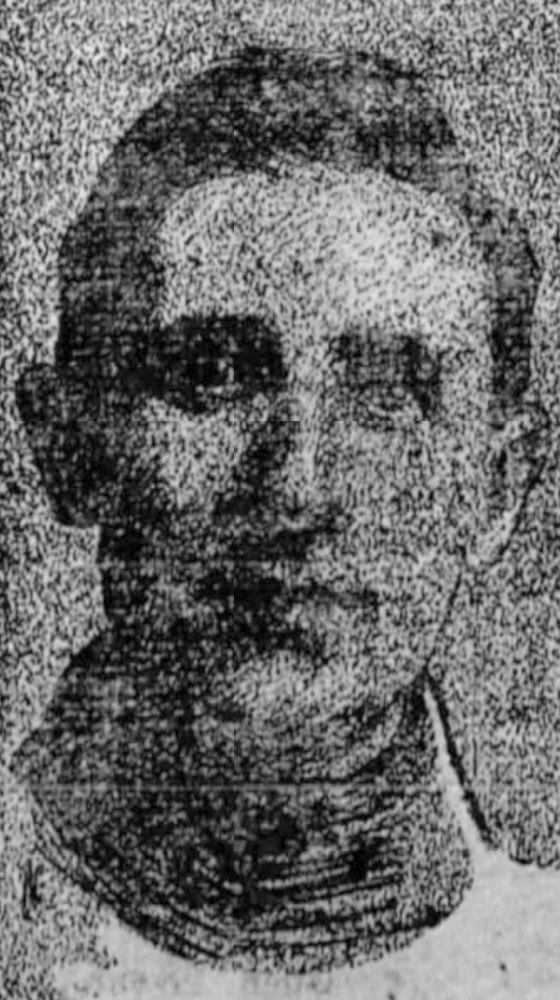
- Boyce c. 1914
- Born: August 24, 1888 Kingston, Ontario, Canada
- Died: October 8, 1959 (aged 71)
- Height: 5 ft 7 in (170 cm)
- Weight: 135 lb (61 kg; 9 st 9 lb)
- Position: Goaltender
- Played for: Montreal Westmount; Montreal Wanderers (NHA)
- Playing career: 1908–1917

Arthur Edward Boyce (August 24, 1888 – October 8, 1959) was a Canadian professional ice hockey goaltender. Boyce played for the Montreal Wanderers of the National Hockey Association from 1911 to 1915. His name is sometimes spelled as Art Boyes.

== Playing career ==
Boyce was born in Kingston, Ontario. He first joined the Wanderers organization in 1908, playing for the Wanderers 'second' team in the Canadian Amateur Hockey League intermediates. He then moved to the Montreal Westmount amateurs for two seasons. He became a professional with the Wanderers in 1911. He was the Wanderers #1 goalie for two seasons, then played two seasons with the Wanderers as the backup.
