= Walter Rooney (ice hockey) =

Canadian ice hockey player (1888–1965)

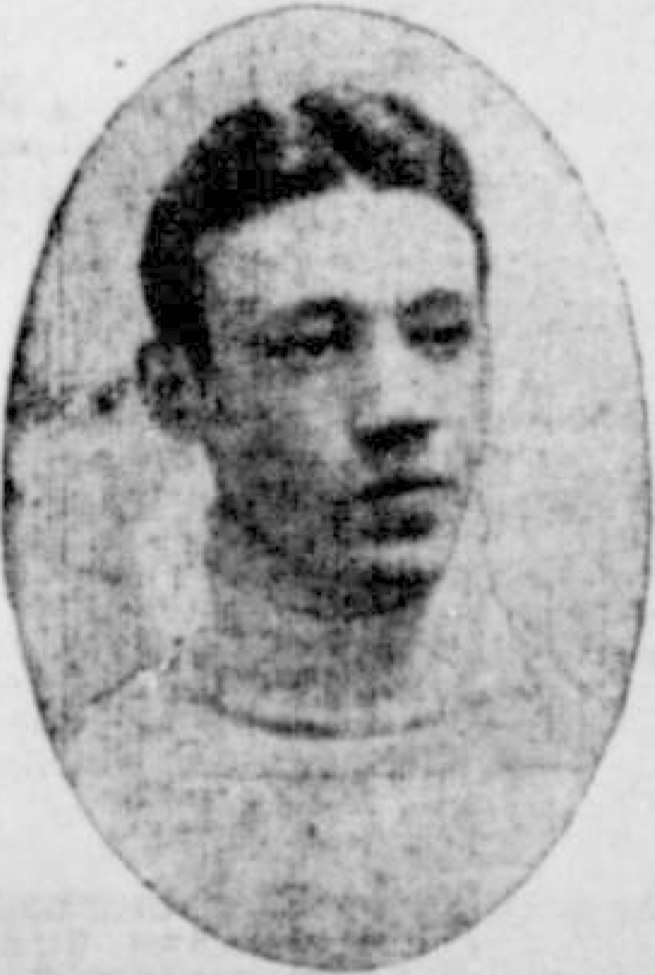
- Rooney with the Quebec Bulldogs, 1912–13 season
- Born: February 13, 1888 Quebec City, Quebec, Canada
- Died: April 9, 1965 (aged 77) Quebec City, QC, CAN
- Height: 5 ft 7 in (170 cm)
- Weight: 140 lb (64 kg; 10 st 0 lb)
- Position: Center
- Shot: Right
- Played for: Quebec Hockey Club
- Playing career: 1909–1916

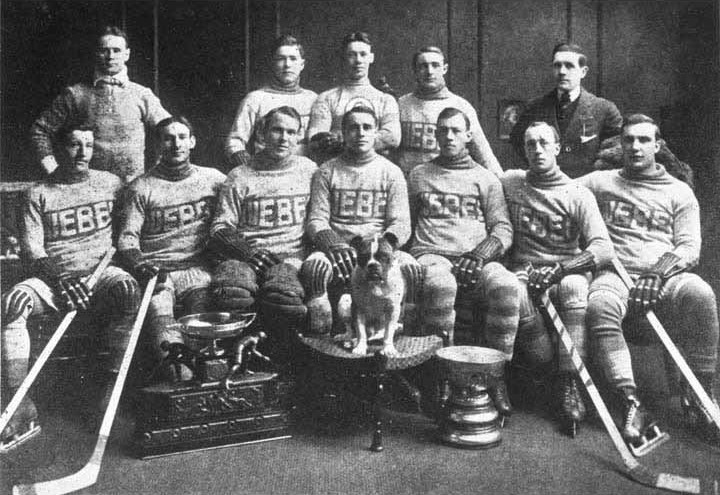
Rooney, standing in the middle in the back row, with the 1912–13 Quebec Bulldogs.

Waldamar Joseph "Walter" Rooney (February 13, 1888 – April 9, 1965) was a professional ice hockey centre for the Quebec Bulldogs. He helped Quebec win the Stanley Cup in 1912. In 1913, Rooney was dressed for Quebec as a spare, but did not play any games. However, he was featured on the Stanley Cup winning picture with the rest of the Bulldogs team.
