= Mike Quinn (ice hockey) =

Canadian ice hockey executive

Michael Quinn
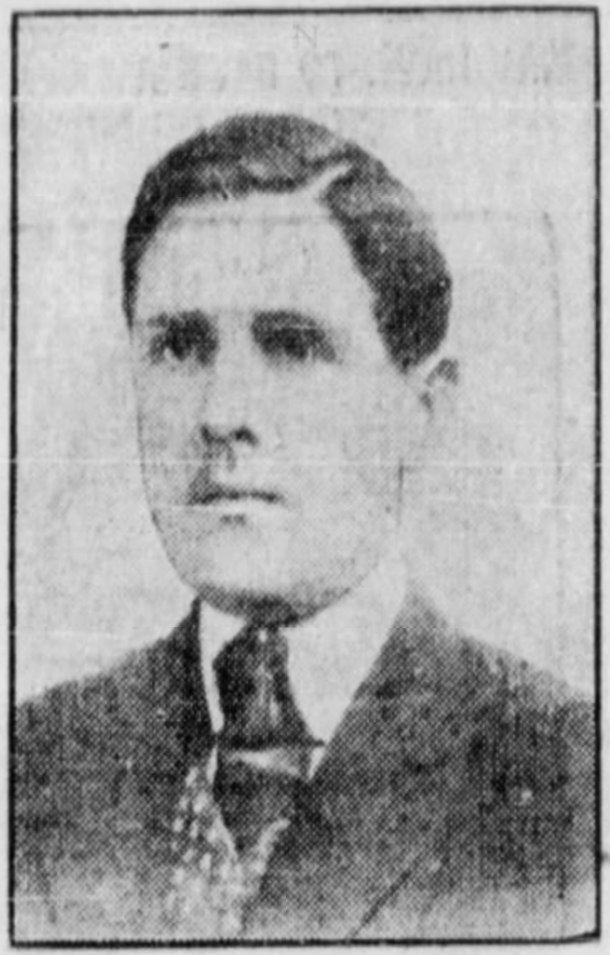
- Quinn c. 1912
- Born: Michael James Joseph Quinn; March 27, 1874; Quebec City, Quebec, Canada
- Died: July 27, 1923 (aged 49); Quebec City, Quebec, Canada
- Occupation(s): Ice hockey coach and general manager

Michael James Joseph Quinn (March 27, 1874 – July 27, 1923) was a Canadian professional ice hockey executive. He was the manager of two Stanley Cup champion squads, the 1912 and 1913 Quebec Bulldogs. He was also head coach of the Bulldogs between 1912–13 and 1916–17 in the National Hockey Association, and with the 1919–20 Quebec Athletic Club in the National Hockey League.

Quinn died in Quebec on July 27, 1923, aged 49.
