= Quebec Bulldogs =

Ice hockey team from 1878 to 1920

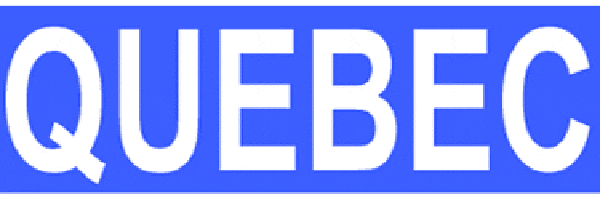
- Founded: 1878
- History: Quebec Hockey Club; 1878–1888 (independent); 1889–1890 (AHAC); 1891 (dormant); 1892–1898 (AHAC); 1899–1905 (CAHL); 1906–1909 (ECAHA); 1910 (CHA); 1910–1917 (NHA); 1917–1919 (dormant); Quebec Athletic Club; 1919–1920 (NHL); Hamilton Tigers; 1920–1925
- Home arena: Quebec Skating Rink (1878–1913); Quebec Arena (1913–1920)
- City: Quebec City, Quebec
- Team colours: Blue, white
- Stanley Cups: 2 (1912, 1913)

The Quebec Bulldogs (French: Bulldogs de Québec) were an ice hockey team based in Quebec City. The team was officially known as the Quebec Hockey Club (French: Club de hockey de Québec), and later as the Quebec Athletic Club (French: Club athlétique de Québec). One of the first organized ice hockey clubs, the club debuted in 1878 with the opening of the Quebec Skating Rink. The club continued as an amateur team through various leagues, eventually becoming professional in 1908. The club would play in the National Hockey Association (the forerunner to the NHL) and the National Hockey League. In 1920, the team moved to Hamilton, Ontario and became the Hamilton Tigers.

== History ==
=== Amateur roots, 1878–1909 ===
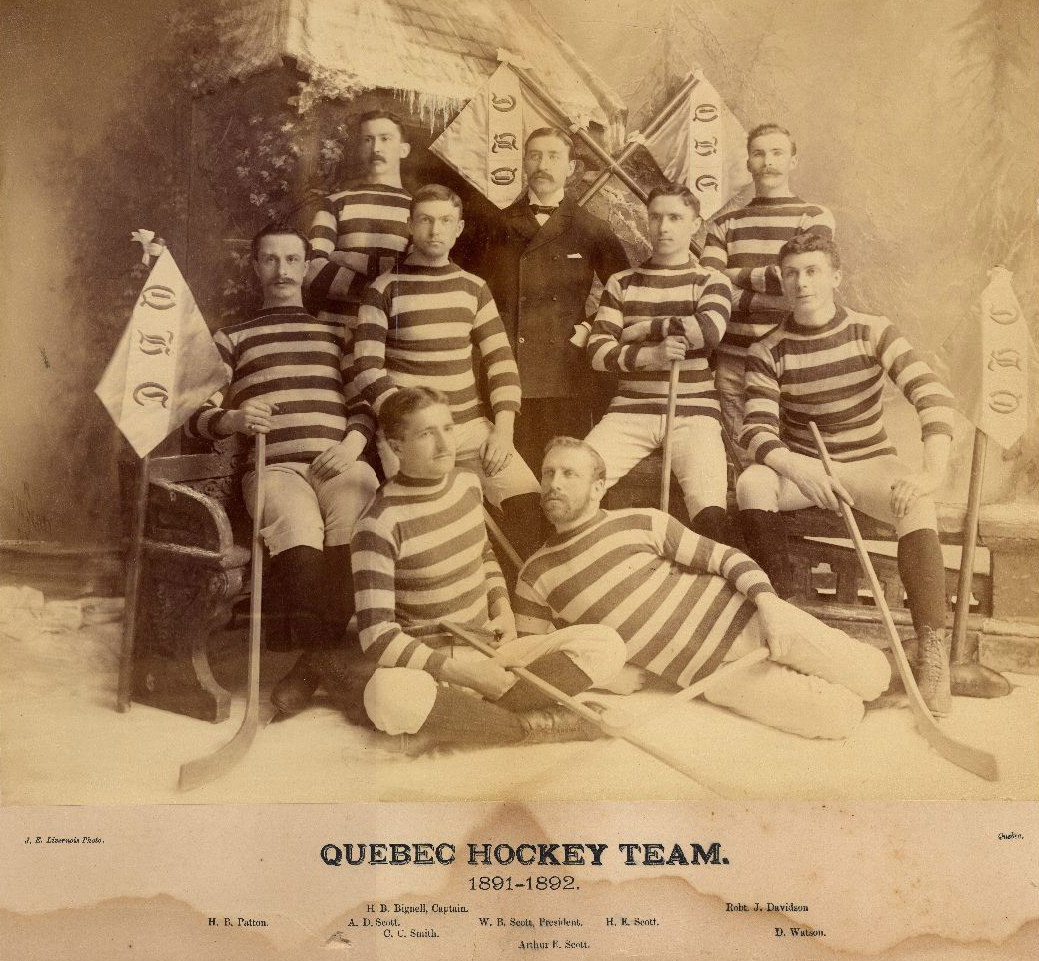
Quebec Hockey Club in 1891–92. Players are Bertram Patton, Herbert Bignell, Arthur Dickson Scott, Charles Smith, Arthur Edward Scott, Herbert Scott, Robert Davidson and David Watson.

The Quebec Hockey Club was founded in 1878, after the construction of the Quebec Skating Rink in 1877. The club consisted of Anglo-Canadian players. Play was by exhibition only, against teams drawn from the club members or visiting teams from Montreal. In 1883, the club played in the Montreal Winter Carnival, and joined the Amateur Hockey Association of Canada (AHAC) in 1888 and were members until 1898. After the AHAC, Quebec played in the Canadian Amateur Hockey League from 1899 to 1905, and the Eastern Canada Amateur Hockey Association from 1906 to 1909. One player that went through the ranks of the Quebec Hockey Club was David Watson (1869–1922), a journalist and newspaper owner who fought as a Major-General in World War I. Watson played for the Quebec HC as a cover point (an offensive defenceman) in the AHAC through the course of the 1890s.

The club came close to winning the Stanley Cup on two occasions. In the 1894 season Quebec tied for the AHAC regular season lead with three other clubs. The AHAC drew up plans to hold the playoff solely in Montreal. Quebec declined to play in Montreal without one game in Quebec and the championship was eventually won by the Montreal Hockey Club. In 1904, Quebec won the CAHL outright. In a dispute, the club did not win the Stanley Cup or challenge for it. The Ottawa Hockey Club was the defending champions in 1903–04, but withdrew from the league. Quebec went on to win the CAHL and expected to receive the Stanley Cup as league champions. The trustees of the Cup instead ruled that the Cup went to Ottawa.

Two significant players on the Quebec Hockey Club during the later part of the first decade of the 1900s were Chubby and Joe Power, who would both later serve as politicians in Quebec. A third Power brother, Rockett Power, also represented the club.

=== National Hockey Association ===
In late 1909, Quebec became a founding member of the Canadian Hockey Association (CHA) in 1909. The CHA, however, would only last one month before being absorbed into the much more powerful National Hockey Association (NHA). Rejected by the new league, the Bulldogs sat out the inaugural 1910 season. The following season, 1910–11, the Bulldogs took over the defunct Cobalt Silver Kings franchise, but had a rough initiation, finishing dead last with four wins and 12 losses in a 16-game season. On a positive note, and a sign of things to come, Jack McDonald scored 14 goals and Tommy Dunderdale scored 13.

For 1911–12, the Bulldogs went from worst to first, with Joe Malone having a spectacular season, to win the O'Brien Cup as champions of the NHA and the Stanley Cup. The Dogs' record improved to 10 wins and eight losses while Malone scored 21 goals and Jack McDonald scored 18. In a Stanley Cup challenge, they crushed the Moncton Victorias in two games, 9–3 and 8–0, in the best-of-three playoff.

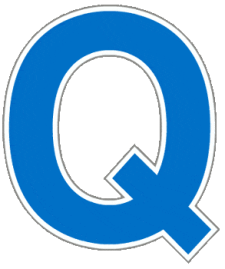
Logo used (1911–1913).

In their third season (1912–13), Quebec would again finish first overall with a record of 16-4 losses to retain the championship. Joe Malone won the scoring race with an unprecedented 43 goals. His teammate, Tommy Smith, was a close second with 39. In a Stanley Cup challenge after the season the team easily beat the Sydney Millionaires in two games by a combined score of 20-5.

The Victoria Aristocrats of the Pacific Coast Hockey Association next challenged the Bulldogs. The powerhouse Bulldogs expected to bowl over the Aristocrats, but were shocked after splitting the first two games and then losing 6–1 in the decisive third game. However, the Stanley Cup Board of trustees did not recognise the challenge because it should have been played in Quebec. PCHA leader Lester Patrick refused. The Bulldogs were able to keep the Cup.

In December 1913, the Bulldogs moved to the new Quebec Arena. The following seasons would see the Bulldogs drop from the top of the league. They would finish third overall in each of the next three seasons and in the last NHA season (1916–17) went second overall. After their two Stanley Cup wins, though, they would never again challenge for the Cup.

=== National Hockey League and the move to Hamilton, 1917–1925 ===
The Bulldogs, along with the Montreal Canadiens, Montreal Wanderers and Ottawa Senators, were frustrated with Toronto Blueshirts owner Eddie Livingstone's acrimonious dealings. However, they discovered that the league constitution did not allow them to simply vote Livingstone out. Instead, the four clubs joined in founding the National Hockey League in 1917, and did not invite Livingstone to join them. Quebec's long-time manager Mike Quinn had retired due to ill health. The other directors of the Bulldogs were unable to get enough financing to make the move to the NHL—no small consideration given that Quebec City was by far the smallest market in the league. They opted to suspend operations for the league's inaugural season. To balance out the schedule, the remaining three clubs granted a temporary franchise to the Toronto Arena Company, the direct ancestors of today's Toronto Maple Leafs.

In 1918, the franchise was sold in principle to Percy Quinn. Quinn's actual intent was to use the Bulldogs to help resurrect the NHA. However, the other owners called Quinn's bluff by demanding a firm commitment to ice a team in the NHL for the 1918–19 season. When Quinn refused to do so, the NHL canceled the franchise leaving Quebec City without a team for the 1918–19 season.

In May 1919, NHL president Calder and Mike Quinn made efforts to return Quebec to the league. Calder suggested that Quinn apply to the league for a new franchise. On December 2, 1919, the NHL approved the application of the Quebec Athletic Club for an NHL franchise. Newspapers at the time now referred to the team as the Quebec Athletics rather than Bulldogs.

While the team had been suspended, their star player, Joe Malone, played for the Canadiens. Malone rejoined the franchise, and won the scoring championship that year with 39 goals. Despite Malone's scoring and the presence of players like Harry Mummery, Quebec had a dismal season, finishing last, with 4 wins and 20 losses.

Before the 1920–21 season, the NHL took back the franchise, and sold it to new owners who moved the team to Hamilton, where it became the Tigers. This helped to head off a potential competing league organized by Livingstone from setting up in Hamilton.

The Tigers played in the NHL from 1920 to 1925. Due in large part to a team players' strike in the 1925 NHL playoffs, the franchise was revoked a second time that summer, this time for good. The entire Tigers roster was then sold to Bill Dwyer, owner of the expansion New York Americans franchise. However, the NHL does not reckon the Americans as a continuation of the Bulldogs/Tigers franchise. The Americans would play in the NHL from 1925 to 1942.

The last active Bulldogs player in major-league hockey was Dave Ritchie, who retired in 1926. The last active Bulldog player was Eddie Oatman, who played pro hockey until 1939 and played against the CAHL Quebec Beavers in 1929.

Over time, various hockey teams played in Quebec, including the minor-pro Quebec Castors and Quebec Aces. Big-league hockey would not return to Quebec City until the Quebec Nordiques were founded in 1972 as part of the new World Hockey Association. They joined the NHL in 1979. However, as with the Bulldogs, they found the going difficult playing in the league's smallest market. They moved to Denver in 1995 as the Colorado Avalanche. A potential National Hockey League expansion bid for Quebec City has been tabled by the league's board of governors since 2015.

== Season-by-season record ==
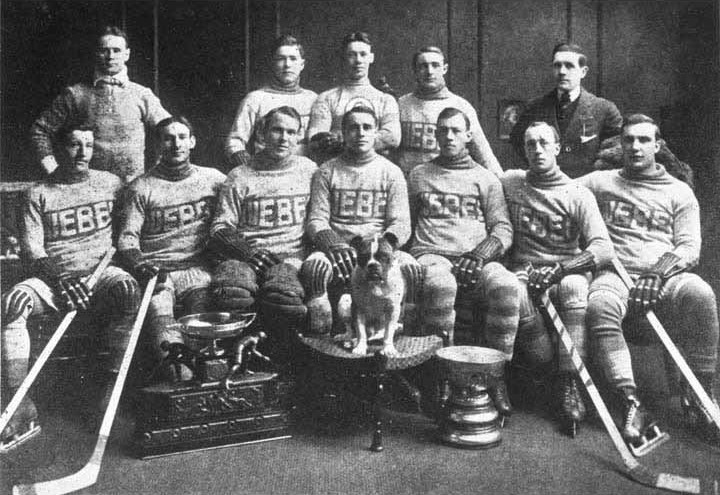
The 1912–13 team with the Stanley Cup.

- 1888–1898 – Amateur Hockey Association of Canada
- 1899–1905 – Canadian Amateur Hockey League
- 1906–1909 – Eastern Canada Amateur Hockey Association
- Jan. 1910 – Canadian Hockey Association
- 1910–1917 – National Hockey Association
- 1919–1920 – National Hockey League

Note: GP = Games played, W = Wins, L = Losses, T = Ties, Pts = Points, GF = Goals for, GA = Goals against

Season	GP	W	L	T	Pts	GF	GA	Finish	Postseason
1888–89	1	0	1	0	–	2	3	lost one AHAC challenge 2–3 to Montreal HC.
1890	1	0	1	0	–	1	5	lost one AHAC challenge 1–5 to Montreal HC.
1891	1	0	1	0	–	0	0	lost one AHAC challenge by default to Montreal HC.
1892	2	0	2	0	–	3	6	lost two AHAC challenges to Ottawa HC.
1893	8	2	5	1	4	23	46	fourth, AHAC	Did not qualify
1894	8	5	3	0	10	26	27	1st place tie, AHAC	Did not participate
1895	7	2	5	0	0	18	27	fifth, AHAC	Did not qualify
1896	8	4	4	0	8	23	23	third, AHAC	Did not qualify
1897	8	2	6	0	4	22	46	fourth, AHAC	Did not qualify
1898	8	2	6	0	4	29	35	fourth, AHAC	Did not qualify
1899	8	0	8	0	0	12	31	fifth, CAHL	Did not qualify
1900	8	2	6	0	4	33	52	fifth, CAHL	Did not qualify
1901	8	1	7	0	2	21	43	fifth, CAHL	Did not qualify
1902	8	4	4	0	8	26	34	fourth, CAHL	Did not qualify
1903	7	3	4	0	6	30	46	fourth, CAHL	Did not qualify
1904	8	7	1	0	14	50	37	first, CAHL	Did not challenge for Stanley Cup
1905	10	8	2	0	16	78	45	second, CAHL	Did not qualify
1906	10	3	7	0	6	57	70	fourth, ECAHA	Did not qualify
1907	10	2	8	0	4	62	88	fifth, ECAHA	Did not qualify
1907–08	10	5	5	0	10	81	74	third, ECAHA	Did not qualify
1909	12	3	9	0	6	78	106	third, ECAHA	Did not qualify
1910	3	2	1	0	6	20	22	n/a	Season incomplete
1910–11	16	4	12	0	8	65	97	fifth, NHA	Did not qualify
1911–12	18	10	8	0	20	81	79	first, NHA	Won O'Brien Cup; Won Stanley Cup
1912–13	20	16	4	0	32	112	75	first, NHA	Won O'Brien Cup; Won Stanley Cup
1913–14	20	12	8	0	24	111	73	third, NHA	Did not qualify
1914–15	20	11	9	0	22	85	85	third, NHA	Did not qualify
1915–16	24	10	12	2	22	91	98	third, NHA	Did not qualify
1916–17 ^{1}	10	2	8	0	4	43	80	sixth, NHA	Did not qualify
1916–17 ^{2}	10	8	2	0	16	54	46	second, NHA	Did not qualify
1919–20 ^{1}	12	2	10	0	4	44	81	fourth, NHL	Did not qualify
1919–20 ^{2}	12	2	10	0	4	47	96	fourth, NHL	Did not qualify
Relocated to Hamilton
Totals	311	134	175	3	267	1422	1662

Note: 1 = first half of season, 2 = second half of season

== Head coaches ==
- Charles Nolan (1910–12)
- Mike Quinn (1912–20)

== Notable players ==
=== Hall of Famers ===
- Rusty Crawford
- Thomas Dunderdale
- Joe Hall
- Joe Malone
- Paddy Moran
- Tommy Smith
- Bruce Stuart
- Hod Stuart

=== Team captains ===
This list is incomplete.

- Hod Stuart (1901)
- Herb Jordan (1905)
- Joe Malone (1910–17, 1919–20)

=== 1912 Stanley Cup champions ===
- Paddy Moran – goal
- Goldie Prodgers – point
- Joe Hall – cover point
- Joe Malone – centre
- Eddie Oatman – right wing
- Jack McDonald – left wing
- Jack Marks – sub
- Walter Rooney – centre sub
- George Leonard – sub
- Joe Savard – sub goalie

=== 1913 Stanley Cup champions ===
- Paddy Moran goal
- Joe Hall – point
- Harry Mummery – cover point
- Joe Malone – centre
- Tommy Smith – right wing
- Jack Marks – left wing
- Russell Crawford – sub
- Billy Creighton – sub
- Jeff Malone – sub
- James "Rockett" Power – sub
- Walter Rooney – sub
- Joe Savard – sub goalie

== See also ==
- List of defunct NHL teams
- List of Quebec Bulldogs players
- Head Coaches of the Quebec Bulldogs
- List of NHL players
- List of Stanley Cup champions
- Quebec Nordiques
- List of NHL seasons
- List of pre-NHL seasons
