= List of Toronto Hockey Club seasons =

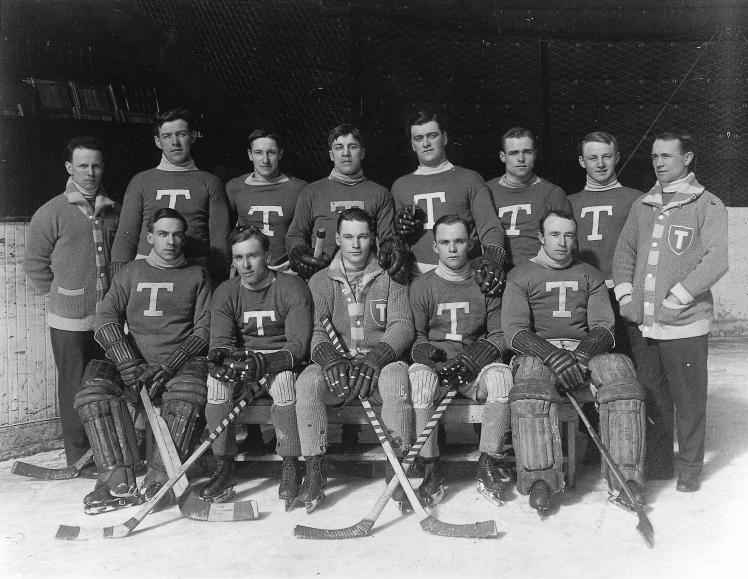
The Torontos, Stanley Cup champions 1913–14

The Toronto Hockey Club, also known as the Torontos and the Toronto Blueshirts, were a professional ice hockey team based in Toronto, Ontario, Canada. They were a member of the National Hockey Association (NHA). The club was founded in 1911 and began operations in 1912. The club won its sole Stanley Cup championship in 1914. The Toronto Hockey Club, which was also known as the Blue Shirts, competed in the NHA from the 1912–13 season to midway through the 1916–17 season when the team suspended operations. In the following offseason, the NHA suspended operations, never to return. Four NHA clubs formed the National Hockey League and granted a temporary franchise to an unnamed Toronto 'hockey club' as a replacement for the NHA team in Toronto. However, the roster was composed mostly of former Blue Shirts, leading the press to call this team "the Torontos" or "the Blue Shirts." This temporary franchise would evolve into today's Toronto Maple Leafs.

== Table keys ==
Key of colors and symbols
Color/symbol	Explanation
#	Led league in points
‡	O'Brien Cup champions
†	Stanley Cup champions

Key of terms and abbreviations
Term or abbreviation	Definition
Finish	Final position in league standings
GA	Goals against (goals scored by the Torontos' opponents)
GF	Goals for (goals scored by the Torontos)
GP	Number of games played
L	Number of losses
Pts	Number of points
T	Number of ties
TG	Two-game total goals series
W	Number of wins
—	Does not apply

== Year by year ==
List of all seasons played by the Toronto Hockey Club
NHA season	Team season	Regular season								Postseason						
NHA season	Team season	GP	W	L	T	Pts	GF	GA	Finish	GP	W	L	T	GF	GA	Result
1912–13	1912–13	20	9	11	0	18	86	95	3rd	—	—	—	—	—	—	Did not qualify
1913–14	1913–14	20	13	7	0	26#	93	65	1st‡	5	4	1	0	18	10	Won NHA Finals^{[a]} vs. Montreal Canadiens, 6–2 (TG); Won 1914 Stanley Cup Finals vs. Victoria Aristocrats, 3–0†
1914–15	1914–15	20	8	12	0	16	66	84	4th	—	—	—	—	—	—	Did not qualify
1915–16	1915–16	24	9	14	1	19	97	98	5th	—	—	—	—	—	—	Did not qualify
1916–17	1916–17^{[b]}	10	5	5	0	10	50	45	4th	—	—	—	—	—	—	Did not qualify
1916–17	1916–17^{[b]}	4	2	2	0	4	14	16	—	—	—	—	—	—	—	Did not qualify
Totals		98	46	51	1	93	406	403	—	5	4	1	0	18	10	—

== Notes ==
- ^{a} The NHA's Quebec Bulldogs held the Stanley Cup entering the 1913–14 season. The Toronto Hockey Club won the Cup by winning the NHA Finals, then successfully defended the Cup against the Pacific Coast Hockey Association champions.
- ^{b} The Toronto Hockey Club was suspended by the NHA for the remainder of the second half of the season.

== See also ==
List of Toronto Maple Leafs seasons
