= 1914 Stanley Cup Challenge series =

1914 ice hockey championship series

1914 Stanley Cup championship
| | 1 | 2 | 3 | Total |
|---|---|---|---|---|
| Toronto HC (NHA) | 5 | 6* | 2 | 3 |
| Victoria Aristocrats (PCHA) | 2 | 5 | 1 | 0 |
- PCHA rules: 2 NHA: 1,3 * – Denotes overtime period(s)
- Location(s): Toronto: Arena Gardens
- Format: best-of-five
- Coaches: Toronto: Dick Carroll; Victoria: Lester Patrick (mgr.)
- Dates: March 14–19, 1914
- Series-winning goal: Harry Cameron (7:00, third)
- Hall of Famers: Toronto HC: Harry Cameron (1963); Scotty Davidson (1950); Frank Foyston (1958); Hap Holmes (1972); Jack Marshall (1965); George McNamara (1958); Jack Walker (1960); Aristocrats: Tommy Dunderdale (1974); Lester Patrick (1947); Coaches: Lester Patrick (1947, player)

The 1914 Stanley Cup Challenge series (billed simply as the Stanley Cup series at the time) was a series between the Victoria Aristocrats, champions of the Pacific Coast Hockey Association (PCHA), and the Toronto Hockey Club (a.k.a., in media of the day, the Torontos or the Blueshirts), champions of the National Hockey Association (NHA). The Torontos defeated the Aristocrats in three games to win the best-of-five series. It was the first officially sanctioned series for the Stanley Cup between the two leagues, starting the "World's Series" era where the champion of the NHA (or its eventual successor the National Hockey League) played off against a PCHA or Western league champion annually for the Stanley Cup. It was also the final series of the "challenge" era, where inter-league series for the Stanley Cup were sanctioned by the Stanley Cup trustees. An anticipated secondary challenge series between Toronto and Sydney, champions of the Maritime League did not take place as Sydney abandoned their challenge for the Cup.

== Paths to the championship ==
Nearing the end of the season, the NHA made arrangements for the NHA champion to receive a challenge from the Sydney Millionaires, Maritime champions, ordered by the Stanley Cup trustees. As arranged by the NHA, the series would have taken place on March 9–11. After that, the winner would face off in a series with the PCHA champions in Toronto. NHA Season ended in a tie. So a two-game, total goals series was set for March 7 and March 11 to declare the NHA Champion and Stanley Cup Champion. Montreal and Toronto each hosted a game. Montreal won the first game, 2–0, then Toronto won the second game, 6–0, winning the total goals series six goals to two.

Because of the NHA playoff series, the series with Sydney Millionaires was postponed. After dispatching the Canadiens, the Blue Shirts series with Sydney was cancelled. Toronto agreed to play a best-of-five series against the Victoria Aristocrats of the Pacific Coast Hockey Association. A controversy erupted when a letter arrived from the Stanley Cup trustees on March 17, stating that the trustees would not let the Stanley Cup travel west, as they did not consider Victoria a proper challenger because they had not formally notified the trustees. However, on March 18, Trustee William Foran stated that it was a misunderstanding. PCHA president Frank Patrick had not filed a challenge, because he had expected Emmett Quinn of the NHA to make all of the arrangements in his role as hockey commissioner, whereas the trustees thought they were being deliberately ignored. In any case, all arrangements had been ironed out and the series was accepted.

Several days later, Foran wrote to Quinn that the trustees are "perfectly satisfied to allow the representatives of the three pro leagues (NHA, PCHA and Maritime) to make all arrangements each season as to the series of matches to be played for the Cup." Thus ended the era of Stanley Cup series arranged by the trustees.

== Game summaries ==
The first game, the first Stanley Cup game in Toronto, was played under NHA rules. Toronto won 5–2 as the "Coast Champions Did Not Show Expected Form" according to the Toronto Globe. Victoria had too much individual play and not enough "team play and combination work."

Scotty Davidson, Toronto's captain, sat out the second game due to the flu. The second game was seven-man hockey, played under PCHA rules, which also meant dividing up the ice into three zones, with the centre zone open to "off-side" passing. Toronto led 3–2 after the first period. Lester Patrick scored twice and Tommy Dunderdale scored in the second to give Victoria a 5–3 lead after two periods. Frank Foyston scored twice in the third to tie the score, sending it to overtime. McGiffin scored the winning goal after 18 minutes of overtime.

Davidson returned for the third game as a substitute for Cully Wilson. The Victoria forwards back-checked well and reduced the shooting opportunities of Toronto. The game had a lot of rough play, and "the man with the puck was generally sent sprawling before he had a chance to shoot," according to The Globe. The Victoria forwards played a good game bringing many shots against Toronto's Harry Holmes in net. Victoria's Patrick injured his wrist in the second period and could not shoot after that. Davidson and Bobby Genge started a fight at 15 minutes of the third period, clearing the benches. Foyston scored for Toronto in the second period, and Cameron scored in the third to score the winning goal. Victoria's Dubby Kerr scored with seven minutes to go, but Victoria was not able to get an equalizer.

| Date | Winning Team | Score | Losing Team | Rules | Notes |
|---|---|---|---|---|---|
| March 14 | Toronto | 5–2 | Victoria Aristocrats | NHA | |
| March 17 | Toronto | 6–5 | Victoria Aristocrats | PCHA | 18:00, OT |
| March 19 | Toronto | 2–1 | Victoria Aristocrats | NHA | |
Toronto wins best-of-five series 3–0

All games played at Arena Gardens.

Total attendance for the series was 14,260 for an average of 4,753 in the 7,500 capacity Arena. At the time, professional hockey was less of a draw than Ontario Hockey Association (OHA) senior hockey. Two games between local OHA senior teams had combined to exceed 14,000 total attendance. The Torontos players and staff received $297 each as their share of the gate receipts.

Game one
| Period one | Player | Time | Score |
|---|---|---|---|
| Toronto | McNamara | 11:00 | Toronto 1–0 |
| Period two | Player | Time | Score |
| Victoria | Dunderdale | 6:00 | 1–1 |
| Toronto | McNamara | 10:00 | Toronto 2–1 |
| Period three | Player | Time | Score |
| Toronto | Walker | 4:00 | Toronto 3–1 |
| Toronto | Davidson | 9:00 | Toronto 4–1 |
| Toronto | McNamara | 11:00 | Toronto 5–1 |
| Victoria | Dunderdale | 17:00 | Toronto 5–2 |

Toronto: Harry "Happy" Holmes goal; George McNamara, point; Jack Marshall, cover point; Frank Foyston, centre; Allan "Scotty" Davidson, Capt., right wing; Jack Walker, left wing; Spares -Con Corbeau -P, Roy "Minnie" McGiffin -RW, Carol "Cully" Wilson -LW, Claude Wilson -G.

Victorias: Bert Lindsay, goal; Bob Genge, point; Lester Patrick, cover point; Tommy Dunderdale, centre; George "Sinner" Poulin, right wing; Albert "Dubbie" Kerr, left wing; Bobby Rowe -RW, Walter Smaill -LW, Jack Ulrich -RW.

Officials: Russel Bowie, referee, Jack Brennan, judge of play.

Att: 5,100

Game two
| Period one | Player | Time | Score |
|---|---|---|---|
| Toronto | Foyston | 3:00 | Toronto 1–0 |
| Toronto | Wilson | 5:30 | Toronto 2–0 |
| Victoria | Smaill | 7:00 | Toronto 2–1 |
| Victoria | Poulin | 11:00 | 2–2 |
| Toronto | Wilson | 14:00 | Toronto 3–2 |
| Period two | Player | Time | Score |
| Victoria | Patrick | 5:30 | 3–3 |
| Victoria | Patrick | 9:00 | Victoria 4–3 |
| Victoria | Dunderdale | 11:00 | Victoria 5–3 |
| Period three | Player | Time | Score |
| Toronto | Foyston | 2:00 | Victoria 5–4 |
| Toronto | Foyston | 7:00 | 5–5 |
| Overtime | Player | Time | Score |
| Toronto | McGiffin | 18:00 | Toronto 6–5 |

Toronto: Holmes, Harry 'Happy" Holmes goal; George McNamara, point; Jack Marshall, cover point; Jack Walker, Rover; Frank Foyston, centre; Allan "Scotty" Davidson, Capt., right wing; Carol "Cully" Wilson, left wing; Spares - Carol "Cully" Wilson - LW, Con Corbeau -P, Roy "Minnie" McGiffin -RW, Claude Wilson -G.

Victorias: Bert Lindsay, goal; Bob Genge, point; Lester Patrick, cover point; George "Sinner" Poulin Rover; Tommy Dunderdale, centre; Albert "Dubbie" Kerr, right wing; Walter Smaill-LW, left wing; Bobby Rowe -RW, Jack Ulrich -RW. Officials: Russell Bowie, referee, Tommy Phillips, judge of play.

Attendance, 4,600. (est.)

Game three
| Period one | Player | Time | Score |
|---|---|---|---|
no score
| Period two | Player | Time | Score |
| Toronto | Foyston | 6:00 | Toronto 1–0 |
| Period three | Player | Time | Score |
| Toronto | Cameron | 7:00 | Toronto 2–0 |
| Victoria | Kerr | 12:00 | Toronto 2–1 |

Toronto: Harry "Happy" Holmes goal; George McNamara, point; Jack Marshall, cover point; Frank Foyston, centre; Allan "Scotty" Davidson, Capt., right wing; Jack Walker, left wing; Spares -Con Corbeau -P, Roy "Minnie" McGiffin RW, Carol "Cully" Wilson -LW, Claude Wilson -G.

Victorias: Bert Lindsay, goal; Bob Genge, point; Lester Patrick, cover point; Tommy Dunderdale, centre; George "Sinner" Poulin, right wing; Albert "Dubbie" Kerr, left wing; Bobby Rowe -RW, Walter Smaill-LW, Jack Ulrich-RW.

Officials: Russell Bowie, referee, Jack Brennan, judge of play.

Att: 4,835

== Stanley Cup engraving ==
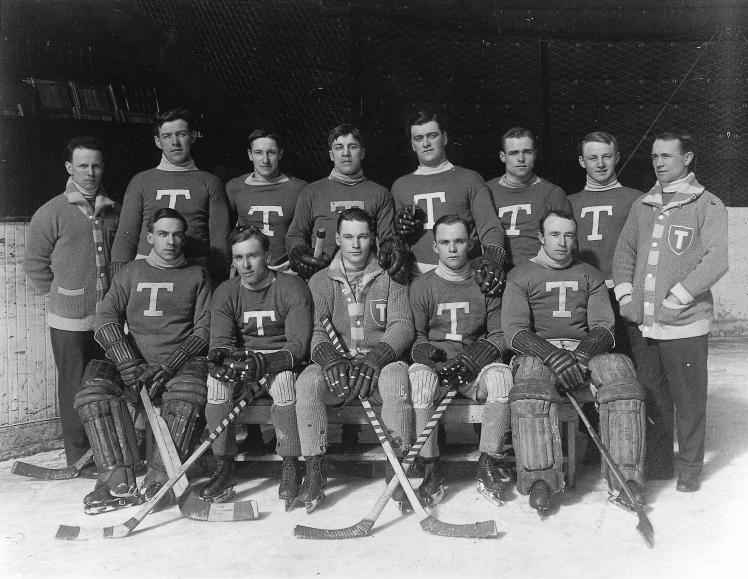
The 1913–14 Torontos, winners of the 1914 Stanley Cup

The 1914 Stanley Cup was presented by the trophy's trustee William Foran.

The following Toronto Hockey Club players and staff were eligible to have their names engraved on the Stanley Cup

1913–14 Toronto Hockey Club

=== Players ===
Centres

- 5 Frank Foyston

Wingers

- 3 Allan Scotty Davidson (Captain)
- James Harriston†
- Roy McGiffen‡
- 7 Jack Walker
- Carol Cully Wilson

Defencemen

- Jack Marshall (Point, Playing-Manager)
- Connie Con Corbeau (Point)
- 2 Harry Cameron (Cover point)
- 4 George McNamara(Cover point)

Goaltenders

- 1 Harry Hap Holmes
- Claude Wilson (sub)

=== Coaching and administrative staff ===
- Frank Robinson (Owner)†
- Percy Quinn (Owner/President)†
- Dick Carroll (Trainer [coach])
- Frank Carroll (Ass't Trainer)
- † missing from team picture ‡ also played rover in the Stanley Cup Final

=== Stanley Cup engraving ===
The Cup was not engraved in 1914. "1914 Toronto H.C." was later engraved on the 1947 ring connecting the upper trophy to the barrel.

== See also ==
- 1913–14 NHA season
- 1913–14 PCHA season

| Preceded by Quebec Bulldogs; 1913 | Toronto Hockey Club (Blueshirts); Stanley Cup champions 1914 | Succeeded by Vancouver Millionaires; 1915 |
