= 1915–16 Toronto Hockey Club season =

NHA hockey team season

1915–16 Toronto Hockey Club
- 1915–16 record: 9–14–1
- Home record: 8–4–0
- Road record: 1–10–0
- Goals for: 97
- Goals against: 98
- Arena: Arena Gardens

The 1915–16 Toronto Hockey Club season was the fourth season of the Toronto franchise in the National Hockey Association (NHA).

== Off-season ==
The club was sold to Eddie Livingstone, owner of the Toronto Shamrocks, before the season. At the same time, the PCHA started a new franchise in Seattle and the new team signed several players from the Torontos: Eddie Carpenter, Frank Foyston (after one game), Hap Holmes, Jack Walker and Cully Wilson. Livingstone merged the rosters of the Shamrocks with Toronto and discontinued the Shamrocks.

== Regular season ==
=== Final standings ===
National Hockey Association
	GP	W	L	T	GF	GA
Montreal Canadiens	24	16	7	1	104	76
Ottawa Senators	24	13	11	0	78	72
Quebec Bulldogs	24	10	12	2	91	98
Montreal Wanderers	24	10	14	0	90	116
Toronto Hockey Club	24	9	14	1	97	98

Note: W = Wins, L = Losses, T = Ties, GF= Goals For, GA = Goals Against

== Schedule and record ==
#	Date	Visitor	Score	Home	Record	Pts
1	December 18	Montreal Canadiens	2–1	Toronto	0–1–0	0
2	December 22	Toronto	1–7	Ottawa Senators	0–2–0	0
3	December 25	Montreal Wanderers	6–5	Toronto	0–3–0	0
4	January 1	Quebec Bulldogs	4–3	Toronto	0–4–0	0
5	January 5	Toronto	1–6	Montreal Canadiens	0–5–0	0
6	January 12	Ottawa Senators	0–1	Toronto	1–5–0	2
7	January 15	Toronto	3–4	Quebec Bulldogs	1–6–0	2
8	January 20	Toronto	4–7	Montreal Wanderers	1–7–0	2
9	January 23	Montreal Canadiens	1–3	Toronto	2–7–0	4
10	January 26	Toronto	1–2	Ottawa Senators	2–8–0	4
11	January 29	Toronto	5–6	Quebec Bulldogs	2–9–0	4
12	January 31	Montreal Wanderers	2–8	Toronto	3–9–0	6
13	February 5	Toronto	5–10	Montreal Canadiens	3–10–0	6
14	February 7	Quebec Bulldogs	5–11	Toronto	4–10–0	8
15	February 9	Toronto	3–3	Quebec Bulldogs	4–10–1	9
16	February 12	Toronto	1–3	Montreal Wanderers	4–11–1	9
17	February 16	Ottawa Senators	1–3	Toronto	5–11–1	11
18	February 19	Toronto	2–5	Ottawa Senators	5–12–1	11
19	February 26	Ottawa Senators	2–9	Toronto	6–12–1	13
20	March 1	Toronto	3–7	Montreal Canadiens	6–13–1	13
21	March 4	Quebec Bulldogs	5–7	Toronto	7–13–1	15
22	March 8	Toronto	3–2	Montreal Wanderers	8–13–1	17
23	March 11	Montreal Wanderers	2–10	Toronto	9–13–1	19
24	March 18	Montreal Canadiens	6–4	Toronto	9–14–1	19

== See also ==
- 1915–16 NHA season
