= Claude Wilson (ice hockey) =

Canadian ice hockey player

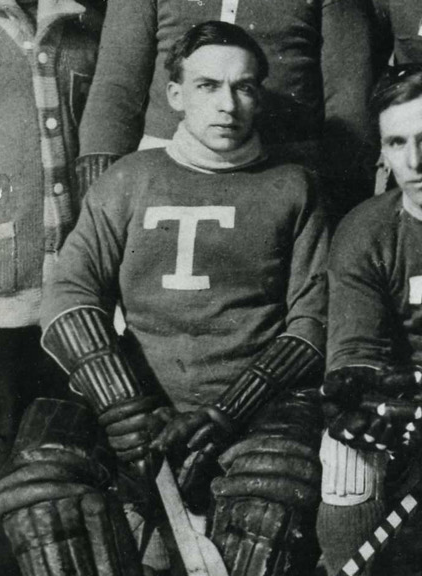
- Wilson in the 1913–14 Blueshirts team photo
- Born: March 4, 1893 Whitby, Ontario, Canada
- Died: May 16, 1976 (aged 83)
- Position: Goaltender
- Played for: Toronto Blueshirts (NHA)
- Playing career: 1907–1916

Claude Wilson (March 4, 1893 – May 16, 1976) was a Canadian professional ice hockey goaltender who spent most of his career serving as the backup netminder for the Toronto Blueshirts. He was a native of Oshawa, Ontario.

== Career ==
During the 1914 NHA season, Wilson appeared in three games as an injury replacement for starting goaltender Hap Holmes, including the first game which included starting in the opening match of the Stanley Cup Final against the Victoria Aristocrats of the Pacific Coast Hockey Association. Although he was featured in the 1914 team photograph alongside the rest of the championship roster, he was released by the Blueshirts the following season. Wilson later rejoined the club, signing a new contract on October 26, 1914, and went on to play three games during the 1915–16 campaign as the backup goaltender to Percy LeSueur.

In late December 1916, while still under contract with the Blueshirts of the National Hockey Association, Wilson became the subject of controversy when he was unexpectedly unavailable for a scheduled game against the Montreal Canadiens. Team owner Eddie Livingstone announced that Wilson had "mysteriously disappeared". It was later discovered that Wilson had traveled to his hometown of Oshawa without notifying anyone in the organization. His sudden absence created a difficult situation for the team, forcing fellow goaltender Billy Nicholson to step in and start in the first two games during Wilson's unexplained leave. The incident was taken very seriously by management, and upon learning the circumstances, the Blueshirts fined Wilson $100, a significant sum at the time, and formally ordered him to return to Toronto.

== Career statistics ==
Season	Team	League	GP	W	L	T/OTL	MIN	GA	GAA	SV%	SO
1907–08	Edmonton Pros	APHL	10	7	2	1	565	51	5.42	—	1
1913–14	Toronto Blueshirts	NHA	3	0	0	0	16	0	0	—	0
NHA totals
