= Les Lowther =

Canadian ice hockey player

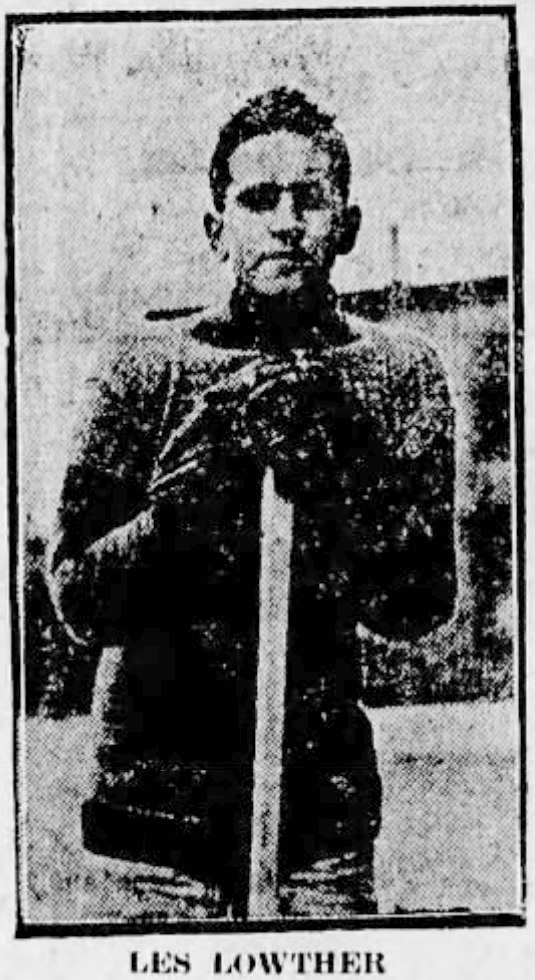
- Born: November 10, 1892 Amherst, Nova Scotia, Canada
- Died: February 21, 1974 (aged 81)
- Height: 5 ft 6 in (168 cm)
- Weight: 165 lb (75 kg; 11 st 11 lb)
- Position: Centre
- Played for: Toronto Blueshirts
- Playing career: 1909–1925

Lester Daniel Lowther (November 10, 1892 – February 21, 1974) was a Canadian professional ice hockey player from Amherst, Nova Scotia, playing the centre forward position. He played with the Toronto Blueshirts of the National Hockey Association during the 1914–15 season. He also played for various teams in the Maritimes in a career that span from 1909 to 1925.
