= 1914–15 Toronto Hockey Club season =

Professional ice hockey team season of play

1914–15 Toronto Hockey Club
- Division: 3rd NHA
- 1914–15 record: 8–12–0
- Home record: 6–4–0
- Road record: 2–8–0
- Goals for: 66
- Goals against: 84

Team information
- General manager: Jack Marshall (December–January); Frank Robinson(from January)
- Coach: Jack Marshall (Dec–Jan); Frank Robinson (from January)
- Arena: Arena Gardens

The 1914–15 Toronto Hockey Club season was the third season of the Toronto franchise in the National Hockey Association (NHA). Toronto finished third during the regular season and did not qualify for the playoffs.

== Off-season ==
The Blueshirts lost their leading scorer Scotty Davidson who enlisted for World War I. Davidson would die while fighting overseas.

== Regular season ==
Jack Marshall was stricken with appendicitis in January 1915 and only played four games this season. After Marshall's operation on January 8, owner Frank Robinson took over as manager and coach.

=== Final standings ===
National Hockey Association
	GP	W	L	T	GF	GA
Ottawa Senators	20	14	6	0	74	65
Montreal Wanderers	20	14	6	0	127	82
Quebec Bulldogs	20	11	9	0	85	85
Toronto Hockey Club	20	8	12	0	66	84
Toronto Ontarios-Shamrocks	20	7	13	0	76	96
Montreal Canadiens	20	6	14	0	65	81

Note: W = Wins, L = Losses, T = Ties, GF= Goals For, GA = Goals Against

=== Game log ===
#	Date	Visitor	Score	Home	Record	Pts
1	December 26	Toronto	4–3	Montreal Canadiens	1–0–0	2
2	December 30	Montreal Wanderers	5–2	Toronto	1–1–0	2
3	January 2	Toronto	2–6	Quebec Bulldogs	1–2–0	2
4	January 6	Toronto Ontarios	3–4	Toronto	2–2–0	4
5	January 9	Toronto	1–2	Ottawa Senators	2–3–0	4
6	January 13	Toronto	3–11	Montreal Wanderers	2–4–0	4
7	January 16	Quebec Bulldogs	1–3	Toronto	3–4–0	6
8	January 20	Toronto	4–3	Toronto Shamrocks	4–4–0	8
9	January 23	Ottawa Senators	2–4	Toronto	5–4–0	10
10	January 27	Montreal Canadiens	1–2	Toronto	6–4–0	12
11	January 30	Montreal Wanderers	2–8	Toronto	7–4–0	14
12	February 3	Toronto	2–7	Ottawa Senators	7–5–0	14
13	February 6	Montreal Canadiens	4–3	Toronto	7–6–0	14
14	February 10	Toronto	5–7	Quebec Bulldogs	7–7–0	14
15	February 13	Toronto	3–6	Toronto Shamrocks	7–8–0	14
16	February 17	Ottawa Senators	3–1	Toronto	7–9–0	14
17	February 20	Toronto	2–7	Montreal Canadiens	7–10–0	14
18	February 24	Toronto Shamrocks	1–5	Toronto	8–10–0	16
19	February 27	Quebec Bulldogs	5–4	Toronto	8–11–0	16
20	March 3	Toronto	4–5	Montreal Wanderers	8–12–0	16

== See also ==
- 1914–15 NHA season
