= Reg Rankin =

Canadian ice hockey player

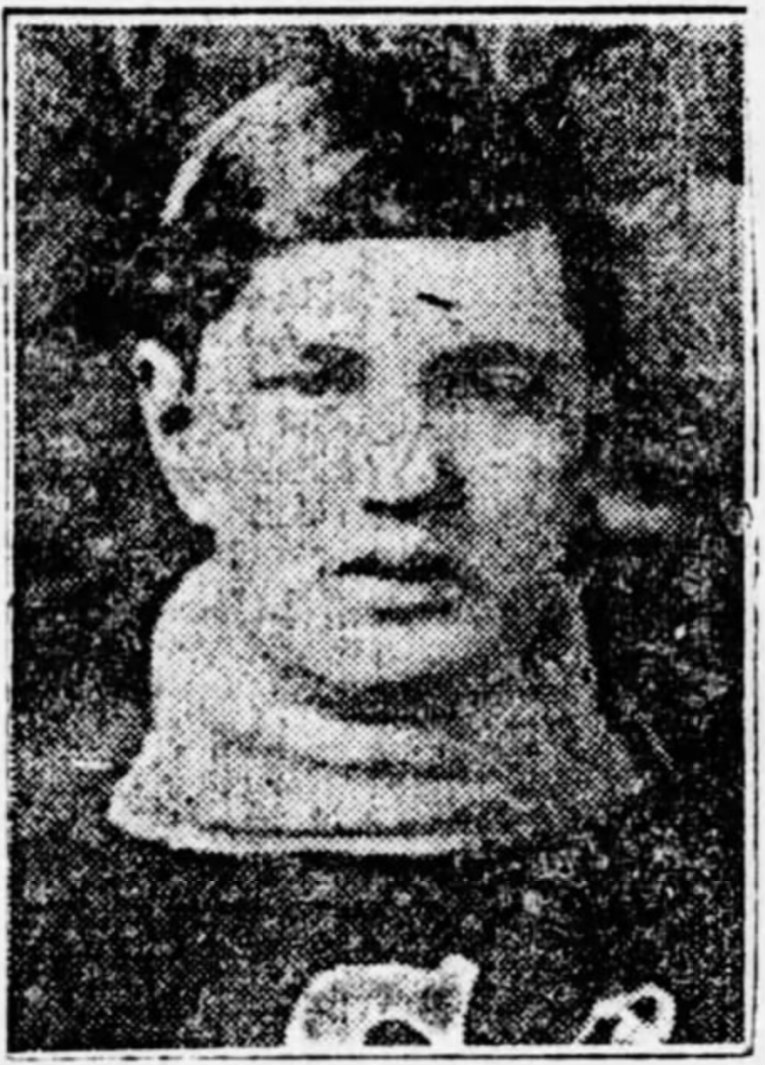
- Born: May 23, 1888; Stratford, ON, CAN
- Died: August 6, 1949 (aged 61)
- Position: Goaltender
- Played for: Toronto Ontarios
- Playing career: 1907–1914

Reginald George Duncan Rankin (May 23, 1888 – August 6, 1949) was a Canadian professional ice hockey player. He played with the Toronto Ontarios of the National Hockey Association, as a substitute goaltender.

He was an older brother of Hockey Hall of Fame inductee Frank Rankin.

== NHA stint ==
Rankin was hit with a puck in the face during his first game with the Toronto Ontarios in the National Hockey Association (NHA), against the Montreal Wanderers on December 27, 1913, and had to leave the game to visit a hospital. He was replaced in the nets by Jack Cross. He was then said to have announced being through with hockey.
