= Harry Cameron =

Canadian ice hockey player (1890–1953)

- Hockey Hall of Fame, 1962
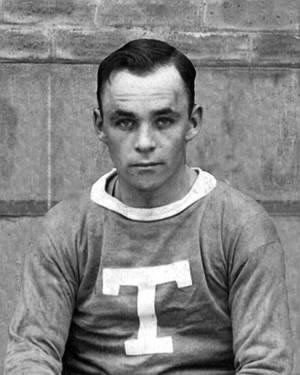
- Born: February 6, 1890 Pembroke, Ontario, Canada
- Died: October 20, 1953 (aged 63) Vancouver, British Columbia, Canada
- Height: 5 ft 10 in (178 cm)
- Weight: 155 lb (70 kg; 11 st 1 lb)
- Position: Defence
- Shot: Right
- Played for: Toronto Blueshirts; Toronto Arenas; Ottawa Senators; Montreal Canadiens; Toronto St. Patricks; Saskatoon Sheiks; Minneapolis Millers; St. Louis Flyers
- Playing career: 1912–1933

Harold Hugh Cameron (February 6, 1890 – October 20, 1953) was a Canadian ice hockey defenceman who played professionally for the Toronto Blueshirts, Toronto Arenas, Ottawa Senators, Toronto St. Pats, and Montreal Canadiens. Cameron won three Stanley Cups in his career: his first as a member of the 1913–14 Toronto Blueshirts, his second as a member of the 1917–18 Blueshirts (Arenas), and his third as a member of the 1921–22 Toronto St. Pats (all predecessor clubs of the Toronto Maple Leafs).

Cameron was considered one of the first great rushing and scoring defencemen. He scored 88 goals in 128 games in the NHL. He was also famous for his "curved shot" similar to that of today's curved hockey sticks. Cameron was the first player in NHL history to achieve what was later called a "Gordie Howe hat trick", doing so on December 26, 1917 during a 7-5 defeat of the Montreal Canadiens. In later years, he moved to Vancouver, British Columbia where he resided when he died in 1953. He was inducted posthumously into the Hockey Hall of Fame in 1963.

== Playing career ==
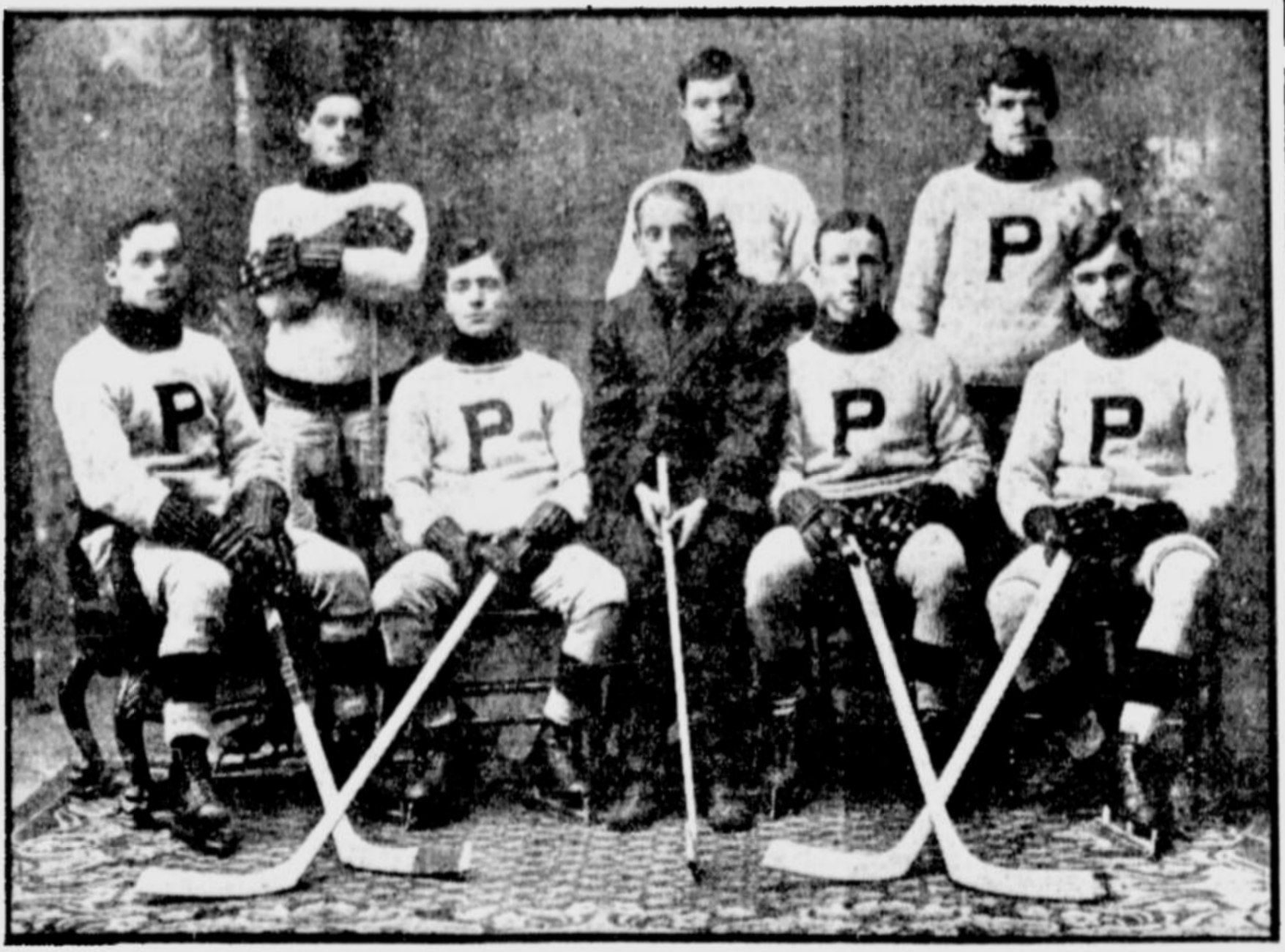
Cameron, seated at far left, with the 1910–11 Pembroke Debaters. Frank Nighbor is seated at far right.

Born in Pembroke, Ontario, Cameron played with the Pembroke Debaters club from 1908 until 1911, before becoming a professional with the Port Arthur Lake City of the Northern Ontario Hockey League (NOHL). The transaction is also famous as he demanded that his friend Frank Nighbor also be signed. While playing with Nighbor in the Upper Ottawa Valley Hockey League (UOVHL) during the 1910–11 season, the Pembroke Debaters won the Citizen Shield after having defeated Vankleek Hill 10 goals to 8. The 1911–12 Port Arthur team also featured future Hockey Hall of Fame member Jack Walker.

Cameron, along with Nighbor, joined the Toronto Blueshirts of the National Hockey Association (NHA) for the 1912–13 season and stayed with the organization until the NHA suspended the franchise in the 1916–17 season, including the 1914 Stanley Cup win. He was picked up by the Montreal Wanderers for the balance of the season, playing six games for the Redbands. In 1917–18 he returned to the Blueshirts, now a franchise in the National Hockey League (NHL), operated by the Toronto Arena Company in their Stanley Cup-winning season. Cameron was the highest-paid player on the 1917–18 Toronto Arenas with a salary of $900, whereas his teammates' salaries ranged from $450 to $750.

In 1918–19, Cameron was loaned to the Ottawa Senators and returned from the Senators in the 1919–20 season to the Toronto team, now named the Toronto St. Pats (St. Patricks). He was traded to the Montreal Canadiens in January 1920 (for Goldie Prodgers), but returned to Toronto the following fall when he was traded back to the club (again for Prodgers, and Joe Matte). The 1920–21 through 1922–23 seasons saw Cameron stay with the St. Pats, winning another Stanley Cup in 1922, the third for Toronto in the NHA and NHL.

After the Stanley Cup win, Cameron was released, and he spent three seasons as a playing coach for the Saskatoon Crescents of the Western Canada Hockey League (WCHL) where he switched to forward. After the Western League was folded and its players absorbed in the NHL, Cameron was not picked up, and he joined a succession of minor league teams in Saskatoon, Minneapolis, and St. Louis before retiring in 1931. He joined the Saskatoon team in 1932–33, playing nine games. He then left the playing side of the game for good and became the Saskatoon coach from 1934 through 1937.

== Playing style ==
"Cameron, on the visiting defence, was the outstanding player on their team. His speedy corkscrew rushes often proved dangerous, and, altho he had trouble carrying the puck over the sticky ice, his work in this respect was very effective."

— Toronto World describing Cameron in a game between the Ottawa Senators and the Toronto St. Patricks in Ottawa on March 10, 1921.

Cameron was a strong puck carrying defenseman who could electrify the crowd with his speedy rushes up the ice, end-to-end rushes which also made him a viable goal-scoring threat in the face of the opposing teams, as he was also a crafty stick handler. During his first two seasons in the NHA with the Toronto Blueshirts Cameron made a strong defensive pairing with Jack Marshall, and even though Cameron was only of average height (5 ft 10 in) and weight (155 lb) he could still use his body on the defensive side of the puck to stop oncoming opponents. Later on, with the Toronto Arenas, he would pair with big-bodied defenseman Harry Mummery (220 lb). In the NHL Cameron had among his defensive partners Sprague Cleghorn (Ottawa Senators and Toronto St. Patricks) and Red Stuart (Toronto St. Patricks).

=== Curved shot ===
"However, Harry Cameron, who had been playing an excellent brand of hockey, with but a few minutes of the first period remaining, let loose a wicked shot from outside the defence and beat the 'wizard of the nets' for St. Patricks initial score."

— Montreal Gazette describing Cameron scoring a goal on Georges Vezina in a game between the Toronto St. Patricks and the Montreal Canadiens in Toronto on December 26, 1920.

Cameron had also a hard shot which landed him many goals throughout his hockey career, and he was one of the few players at the time who could curve his shot. Long time New York Rangers right-winger Bill Cook, a teammate of Cameron with the Saskatoon Crescents of the WCHL and the WHL from 1923–1926, claimed Cameron could shoot curving pucks. Left winger Cy Denneny, a teammate of Cameron on the 1915–16 Toronto Blueshirts and the 1918–19 Ottawa Senators, was another player who could do the same trick, but both Cameron and Denneny employed especially scooped sticks for the deed. The players on the 1930–31 New York Rangers (including Cook, Leo Bourgeault, Frank Boucher, Murray Murdoch, John Ross Roach, and Eddie Rodden), in a newspaper interview with Harold C. Burr of The Brooklyn Daily Eagle, agreed that there was no one in the National Hockey League at that time who could fire off a curved vulcanized rubber disk in the same type of fashion. Cameron for the 1930–31 season had taken his hockey playing services to the St. Louis Flyers of the AHA.

Although hockey sticks at the time were made almost exclusively with straight blades, Frank Boucher once claimed that Cameron played with a stick that was "crooked like a sabre", which allowed him to make his shots drop or veer to either side. Nevertheless, a small handful of contemporary players like Gordie Roberts were able to curve the path of pucks simply by wrist action, and modern historians speculate that Cameron had this ability as well.

== Career statistics ==
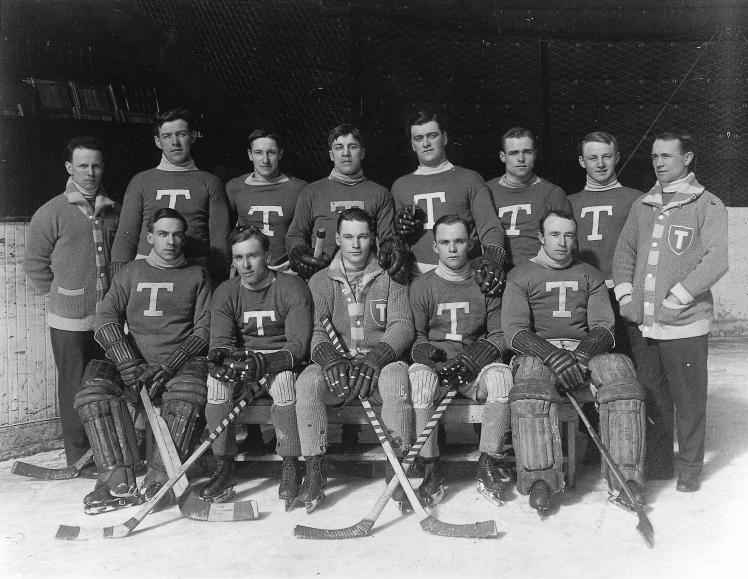
Cameron, second from the right in the front row, with the 1913–14 Toronto Blueshirts.

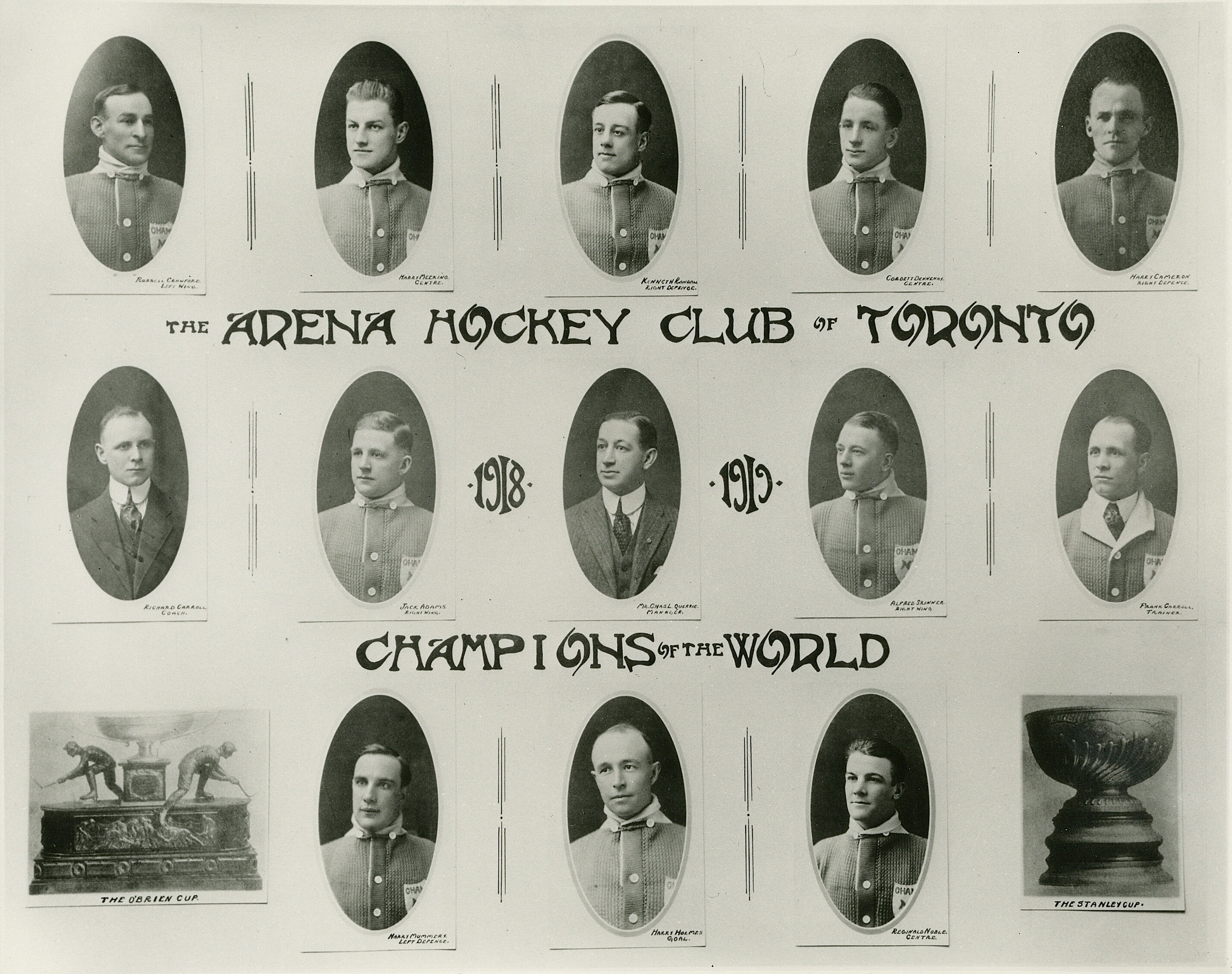
Cameron, in the upper right corner, with the 1917–18 Toronto Arenas.

=== Regular season and playoffs ===
			Regular season					Playoffs
Season	Team	League	GP	G	A	Pts	PIM	GP	G	A	Pts	PIM
1908–09	Pembroke Debaters	UOVHL	6	13	0	13	—	—	—	—	—	—
1909–10	Pembroke Debaters	UOVHL	8	17	0	17	—	—	—	—	—	—
1910–11	Pembroke Debaters	UOVHL	6	9	1	10	8	2	4	4	8	0
1911–12	Port Arthur Lake City	NOHL	15	6	0	6	48	2	2	0	2	0
1912–13	Toronto Blueshirts	NHA	20	9	0	9	20	—	—	—	—	—
1913–14	Toronto Blueshirts	NHA	19	15	4	19	22	2	0	2	2	6
1913–14	Toronto Blueshirts	St-Cup	—	—	—	—	—	3	1	0	1	4
1914–15	Toronto Blueshirts	NHA	17	12	8	20	43	—	—	—	—	—
1915–16	Toronto Blueshirts	NHA	24	8	3	11	70	—	—	—	—	—
1916–17	Toronto Blueshirts	NHA	14	8	4	12	20	—	—	—	—	—
1916–17	Montreal Wanderers	NHA	6	1	1	2	9	—	—	—	—	—
1917–18	Toronto Arenas	NHL	21	17	10	27	28	2	1	2	3	0
1917–18	Toronto Arenas	St-Cup	—	—	—	—	—	5	3	1	4	12
1918–19	Toronto Arenas	NHL	7	6	2	8	9	—	—	—	—	—
1918–19	Ottawa Senators	NHL	7	5	1	6	26	5	4	0	4	26
1919–20	Toronto St. Patricks	NHL	7	3	0	3	6	—	—	—	—	—
1919–20	Montreal Canadiens	NHL	16	12	5	17	36	—	—	—	—	—
1920–21	Toronto St. Patricks	NHL	24	18	9	27	35	2	0	0	0	2
1921–22	Toronto St. Patricks	NHL	24	18	17	35	22	2	0	2	2	8
1921–22	Toronto St. Patricks	St-Cup	—	—	—	—	—	4	0	2	2	14
1922–23	Toronto St. Patricks	NHL	22	9	7	16	27	—	—	—	—	—
1923–24	Saskatoon Crescents	WCHL	29	10	10	20	16	—	—	—	—	—
1924–25	Saskatoon Crescents	WCHL	28	13	7	20	21	2	1	0	1	0
1925–26	Saskatoon Crescents	WHL	30	9	3	12	12	2	0	0	0	0
1926–27	Saskatoon Sheiks	PHL	31	26	19	45	20	4	1	0	1	4
1927–28	Minneapolis Millers	AHA	19	2	3	5	32	—	—	—	—	—
1928–29	St. Louis Flyers	AHA	34	14	3	17	30	—	—	—	—	—
1929–30	St. Louis Flyers	AHA	46	14	6	20	34	—	—	—	—	—
1930–31	St. Louis Flyers	AHA	37	4	3	7	30	—	—	—	—	—
1932–33	Saskatoon Crescents	WCHL	9	0	0	0	4	—	—	—	—	—
NHA totals			100	53	20	73	184	2	0	2	2	6
WCHL/WHL totals			87	32	20	52	49	4	1	0	1	4
St-Cup totals			—	—	—	—	—	12	4	3	7	30
NHL totals			128	88	51	139	189	11	5	4	9	16

== Awards and achievements ==
- Stanley Cup – 1914 (with Toronto Blueshirts), 1918 (with Toronto Arenas), and 1922 (with Toronto St. Patricks)
- Inducted into the Hockey Hall of Fame in 1963
