= 1913–14 Toronto Hockey Club season =

NHA hockey team season

1913–14 Toronto Hockey Club
- Stanley Cup champions
- 1913–14 record: 13–7–0
- Home record: 8–2–0
- Road record: 5–5–0
- Goals for: 93
- Goals against: 65

Team information
- General manager: Percy Quinn
- Coach: Jack Marshall
- Captain: Scotty Davidson
- Arena: Arena Gardens

The 1913–14 Toronto Hockey Club season was the second season of the Toronto franchise in the National Hockey Association (NHA). The Blue Shirts would win the NHA championship in a playoff to take over the Stanley Cup. The club then played and defeated the Victoria Aristocrats in the first hockey "World Series" against the champion of the Pacific Coast Hockey Association (PCHA).

== Off-season ==
Bruce Ridpath resigned as general manager of the club prior to the season, replaced by the owner Percy Quinn. Jack Marshall returned as coach. Ridpath himself tried out as a player but gave up his comeback before the season started. Of the previous season's squad, Archie McLean was dropped and Frank Nighbor moved to British Columbia. Jack Walker, who had played one game with Toronto in the previous season before playing in the Maritime league was added. Con Corbeau was acquired from the Toronto Ontarios just before the start of the season.

== Regular season ==
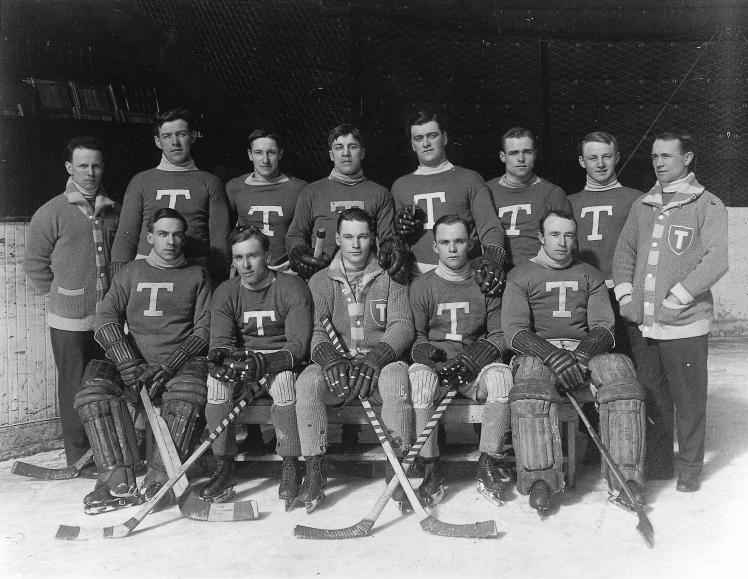
The 1913–14 Torontos

Harry Cameron suffered a separated shoulder and the Torontos acquired George McNamara from the Ontarios for cash in mid-season. The Torontos had a two-game lead in the standings with two games to go, but lost both to drop into a tie with the Montreal Canadiens. It was rumoured that the Torontos had thrown the last two games to get an extra home game from a final with Montreal.

=== Final standings ===
National Hockey Association
	GP	W	L	T	P	GF	GA
Toronto Hockey Club	20	13	7	0	26	93	65
Montreal Canadiens	20	13	7	0	26	85	65
Quebec Bulldogs	20	12	8	0	24	111	73
Ottawa Senators	20	11	9	0	22	65	71
Montreal Wanderers	20	7	13	0	14	102	125
Toronto Ontarios	20	4	16	0	8	61	118

Note: W = Wins, L = Losses, T = Ties, P = Points, GF= Goals For, GA = Goals Against

=== Schedule and results ===
#	Date	Visitor	Score	Home	Record	Pts
1	December 27	Montreal Canadiens	0–3	Toronto	1–0–0	2
2	December 30	Toronto	3–7	Montreal Wanderers	1–1–0	2
3	January 3	Quebec Bulldogs	3–6	Toronto	2–1–0	4
4	January 7	Toronto	9–3	Toronto Ontarios	3–1–0	6
5	January 10	Ottawa Senators	3–2	Toronto	3–2–0	6
6	January 14	Montreal Wanderers	2–10	Toronto	4–2–0	8
7	January 17	Toronto	9–4	Quebec Bulldogs	5–2–0	10
8	January 21	Toronto Ontarios	2–9	Toronto	6–2–0	12
9	January 24	Toronto	1–4	Ottawa Senators	6–3–0	12
10	January 28	Toronto	3–4	Montreal Canadiens	6–4–0	12
11	January 31	Toronto	5–3	Montreal Wanderers	7–4–0	14
12	February 4	Ottawa Senators	1–2	Toronto	8–4–0	16
13	February 7	Toronto	3–9	Montreal Canadiens	8–5–0	16
14	February 11	Quebec Bulldogs	3–4	Toronto	9–5–0	18
15	February 14	Toronto Ontarios	1–3	Toronto	10–5–0	20
16	February 18	Toronto	4–1	Ottawa Senators	11–5–0	22
17	February 21	Montreal Canadiens	2–3	Toronto	12–5–0	24
18	February 25	Toronto	6–1	Toronto Ontarios	13–5–0	26
19	February 28	Toronto	3–5	Quebec Bulldogs	13–6–0	26
20	March 4	Montreal Wanderers	7–5	Toronto	13–7–0	26

== NHA playoffs ==
Tied at the top of the standings, the Blueshirts and Canadiens faced off in a two-game, total goals series for the league championship and Stanley Cup. The Blueshirts won the series 6–2.

Toronto 6, Montreal Canadiens 2

#	Date	Visitor	Score	Home	Record
1	March 7	Toronto	0–2	Montreal Canadiens	0–1
2	March 11	Montreal Canadiens	0–6	Toronto	1–1

== Stanley Cup playoffs ==
The 1913–14 season marked the end of the challenge era in Stanley Cup history. After dispatching the Canadiens, the Blueshirts faced off against the Victoria Aristocrats of the Pacific Coast Hockey Association (PCHA) in a best-of-five series, with all games played at the Arena Gardens. As one of the duties of the hockey commission for the NHA, PCHA and Maritime leagues, the playoff with the PCHA had been arranged prior to the season, but it had not been cleared with the Stanley Cup trustees. A controversy erupted when a letter arrived from the Stanley Cup trustees on March 17, that the trustees would not let the Stanley Cup travel west, as they did not consider Victoria a proper challenger because they had not formally notified the trustees. However, on March 18, Trustee William Foran stated that it was a misunderstanding. PCHA president Frank Patrick had not filed a challenge, because he had expected Emmett Quinn of the NHA to make all of the arrangements in his role as hockey commissioner, whereas the trustees thought they were being deliberately ignored. In any case, all arrangements had been ironed out and the Victoria challenge was accepted. The trustees later sent a letter to league executives that Stanley Cup playoff arrangements would be handled by the leagues themselves henceforth.

Total attendance for the series was 14,260, out of a possible 22,500 (including standing room) capacity at the Arena. At the time, professional hockey was less of a draw than Ontario Hockey Association (OHA) senior hockey. Two games between local OHA senior teams had drawn over 14,000. The Torontos players and staff received $297 each as their share of the gate receipts.

Toronto 3, Victoria 0

#	Date	Visitor	Score	Home	Record
1	March 14	Victoria Aristocrats	2–5	Toronto	1–0
2	March 17	Victoria Aristocrats	5–6	Toronto	2–0
3	March 19	Victoria Aristocrats	1–2	Toronto	3–0

== See also ==
- 1913–14 NHA season
