= James Harriston =

Canadian ice hockey player

James Harriston was a professional ice hockey player. He played one season in the National Hockey Association in 1914. Harriston played one regular season game for the Stanley Cup champions Toronto Blueshirts at right wing. Harriston is missing from 1914 Toronto Blueshirts team picture.
