= Roy McGiffin =

Canadian ice hockey player

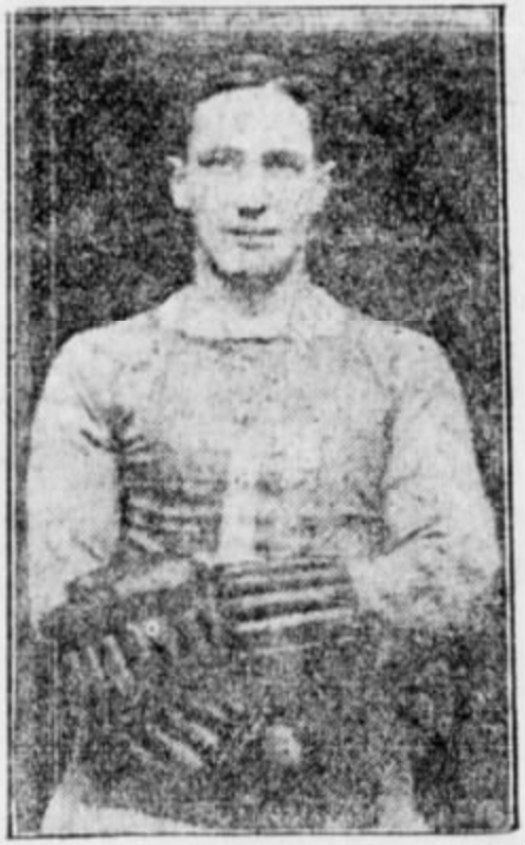
- Born: March 2, 1890 Oakville, Ontario, Canada
- Died: August 30, 1918 (aged 28) Wichita Falls, Texas, U.S.
- Height: 5 ft 8 in (173 cm)
- Weight: 160 lb (73 kg; 11 st 6 lb)
- Position: Left wing
- Shot: Left
- Played for: Toronto Blueshirts
- Playing career: 1907–1915

Francis Roy "Minnie" McGiffin, last name sometimes spelt McGiffen, (March 2, 1890 – August 30, 1918) was a Canadian professional ice hockey player. He played for the Toronto Blueshirts of the Canadian National Hockey Association (NHA) from 1912 to 1915. He was a member of the 1914 Stanley Cup championship Blueshirts team.

== Playing career ==
Roy McGiffin played amateur hockey from age 15 with the Coldwater Hockey Club, moving from there to Toronto Simcoe, Toronto Amateur Athletic Club and back to Toronto Simcoe for the 1909–10 season. He played the 1911–12 season for Cleveland Athletic Club, before turning professional with the Toronto Blueshirts in 1912–13. He played three seasons with the Blueshirts before retiring after the 1914–15 season.

In the 1914 Stanley Cup challenge of Victoria Aristocrats against the Blueshirts, McGiffin scored the game-winning goal of game two. That season, he led the league in penalty fines of $116.

In a February 17, 1915 regular-season game against the Ottawa Senators, McGiffin became involved in a fight with Art Ross that ended with both players being arrested by Toronto police. After spending the night in jail, both players were fined $1. McGiffin lost a coin toss with Ross and paid both fines. The referee of the match Cooper Smeaton wanted McGiffin barred from the league, denouncing him as a rough player.

After the 1914–15 season, he quit hockey for business and moved to Dinuba, California. He had lived there previously for a year from 1910 to 1911 after his junior hockey days. In June 1917 he married Lillian Schroeder of San Francisco.

McGiffin served in the U.S. Army Air Service during World War I, and was an instructor of aerobatics. On August 30, 1918, Flight-Lieutenant McGiffin was killed in an airplane crash about a mile and a half northeast of Call Field in Wichita Falls, Texas. He was looping at an altitude of 2,000 feet when his plane crashed.

== Playing style ==
Roy McGiffin was known as a rough player, somewhat in the mold of a modern-day enforcer, and he collected a total amount of 300 penalty minutes over 51 games during his three year long NHA career. But Jack Marshall, a teammate of McGiffin on the Toronto Blueshirts and a subsequent Hockey Hall of Fame inductee, thought McGiffin's reputation as a violent player was exaggerated and claimed that most of his violent outbursts were for intimidation purposes only:

"He's a good little fellow, and wouldn't hurt a fly. When he swings at a player's head, he always knows that the player is well out of range. He does it for effect. Not a player in the N.H.A. was injured to any extent by McGiffen last year, while "Minnie" lost more teeth and bore more scars than any other player in the league."

— Jack Marshall on Roy McGiffin.

It seemed not everyone agreed on Marshall's assertion of McGiffin as a "good little fellow." According to Montreal Gazette sports journalist Dink Carroll, longtime NHL referee Mike Rodden, when asked about McGiffin, claimed "[McGiffin] wasn't a bad man. He was a mad man."

== Career statistics ==
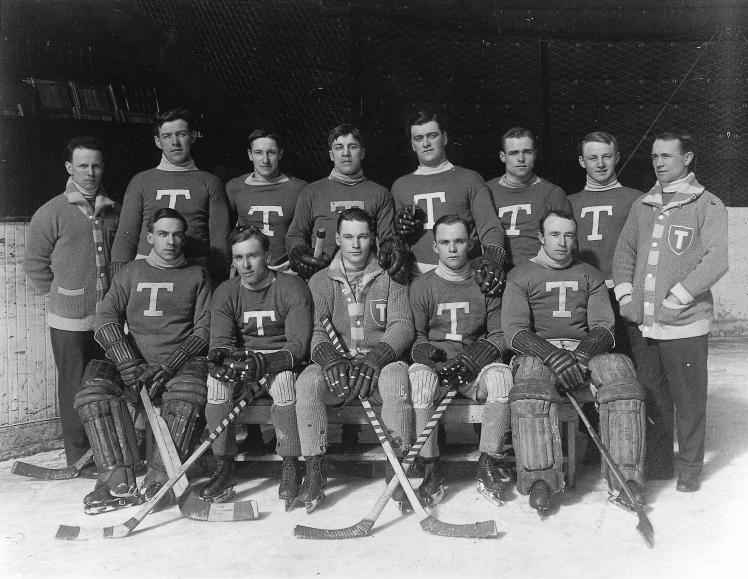
McGiffin, third from left in the back row, with the 1913–14 Toronto Blueshirts.

			Regular season					Playoffs
Season	Team	League	GP	G	A	Pts	PIM	GP	G	A	Pts	PIM
1912–13	Toronto Blueshirts	NHA	15	7	1	8	83	—	—	—	—	—
1913–14	Toronto Blueshirts	NHA	18	6	5	11	86	2	0	0	0	11
1914*	Toronto Blueshirts	St-Cup	—	—	—	—	—	3	2	0	2	25
1914–15	Toronto Blueshirts	NHA	18	4	0	4	131	–	–	–	–	–
NHA totals			51	17	6	23	300	2	0	0	0	11

* Stanley Cup Champion
Source: Society for International Hockey Research
