= George Warwick =

Canadian ice hockey player

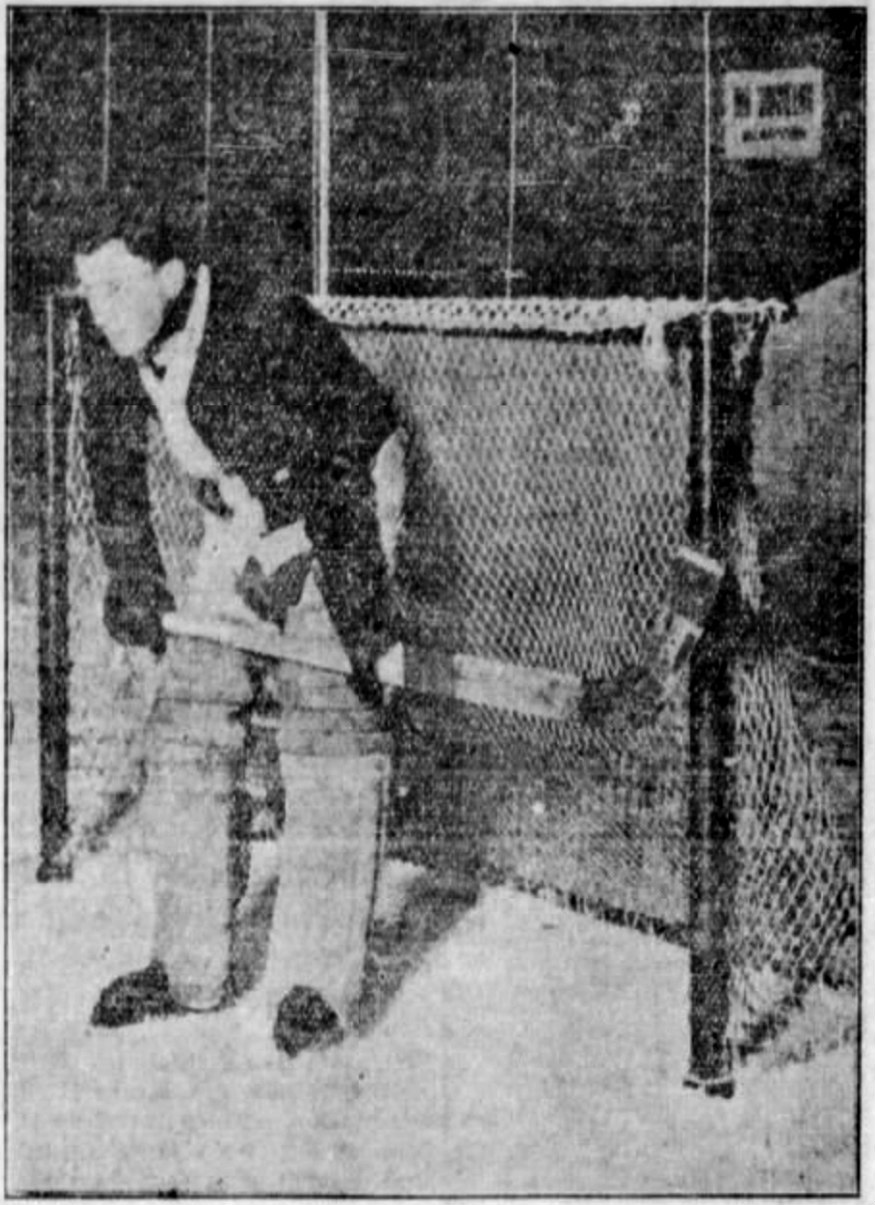
- Warwick with McGill University in 1911–12
- Born: May 1, 1890; Brockville, Ontario, Canada
- Died: September 28, 1964 (aged 74)
- Height: 5 ft 10 in (178 cm)
- Weight: 175 lb (79 kg; 12 st 7 lb)
- Position: Goaltender
- Played for: Montreal Wanderers
- Playing career: 1913–1914

George William Warwick (May 1, 1890 – September 28, 1964) was a Canadian professional ice hockey player. He played with the Montreal Wanderers of the National Hockey Association during the 1913–14 NHA season.

Warwick played with McGill University in 1911–12 and in Hartford, Connecticut in 1912–13.
