= Joel Rochon =

Canadian ice hockey player

- Born: August 2, 1891; Fort William, Ontario, Canada
- Died: February 24, 1965 (aged 73); Kimberley, British Columbia, Canada
- Height: 5 ft 3 in (160 cm)
- Weight: 144 lb (65 kg; 10 st 4 lb)
- Position: Centre
- Played for: Montreal Canadiens
- Playing career: 1906–1921

Joseph Joel Rochon (August 2, 1891 – February 24, 1965) was a Canadian professional ice hockey player. He played briefly with the Montreal Canadiens of the National Hockey Association in 1916–17.

The Montreal Canadiens refer to him as "Jules" Rochon in their online database, as does Claude Mouton in his book. An article in the Montreal newspaper La Patrie refers to him going west, while an article in an Edmonton newspaper refers to "George" Rochon, the former player with Les Canadiens joining the western team. Name changes were not infrequent in early hockey. Most frequently, a player changed his first name to join an amateur team after playing professional. In Rochon's case, the Canadiens may have called him Jules to indicate a French-Canadian heritage.

== Hook check ==
Both Rochon himself and fellow Fort William native Jack Adams, the latter a distinguished player and coach and a member of the Hockey Hall of Fame, claimed Rochon was the player who came up with the hook check, a defensive check where a player sweeps or hooks his stick low to the ice in an effort to remove the puck from an opponent's stick. The hook check and the related poke check were both mastered and popularized by Frank Nighbor during the 1910s and 1920s, and Jack Adams, in 1960, claimed Nighbor must have learned the check from Rochon while playing against Fort William while he was a member of the Port Arthur team of the New Ontario Hockey League (NOHL) in the early 1910s. Nighbor denied this and instead claimed he learned the check from his Port Arthur teammate Jack Walker.
