= 1916–17 Toronto Hockey Club season =

NHA hockey team season (last NHA season)

1916–17 Toronto Hockey Club
- 1916–17 record: 7–7–0
- Home record: 4–3–0
- Road record: 3–4–0
- Goals for: 64
- Goals against: 61
- Arena: Arena Gardens

The 1916–17 Toronto Hockey Club season was the fifth and final season of the Toronto franchise in the National Hockey Association (NHA). With the departure of the Toronto 228th Battalion when their regiment was ordered overseas, the NHA decided to suspend the Toronto Blueshirts franchise as well for the remainder of the season. Before the start of the next season, the NHA folded and a new league, the National Hockey League (NHL), was founded with a new team, the Toronto Hockey Club, which went on to become the present day Toronto Maple Leafs.

== Regular season ==
=== Final standings ===
National Hockey Association
First Half	GP	W	L	T	GF	GA
Montreal Canadiens	10	7	3	0	58	38
Ottawa Senators	10	7	3	0	56	41
Toronto 228th Battalion	10	6	4	0	70	57
Toronto Hockey Club	10	5	5	0	50	45
Montreal Wanderers	10	3	7	0	56	72
Quebec Bulldogs	10	2	8	0	43	80

Second Half	GP	W	L	T	GF	GA
Ottawa Senators	10	8	2	0	63	22
Quebec Bulldogs	10	8	2	0	54	46
Montreal Canadiens	10	3	7	0	31	42
Montreal Wanderers	10	2	8	0	38	65

Note: W = Wins, L = Losses, T = Ties, GF= Goals For, GA = Goals Against
After the 228th Battalion dropped out, and Toronto suspended, the schedule was revised so that the remaining teams would play a 20 game schedule of two halves containing 10 games each. Some of the games to that point were moved into the second half. The 'second half' standings therefore include some games that the 228th and Toronto played.

=== Game log ===
==== First half ====
#	Date	Visitor	Score	Home	Record	Pts
1	December 27	Toronto	7–1	Montreal Canadiens	1–0–0	2
2	December 30	Quebec Bulldogs	5–8	Toronto	2–0–0	4
3	January 3	Toronto 228th Battalion	4–9	Toronto	2–1–0	4
4	January 6	Toronto	2–3	Ottawa Senators	2–2–0	4
5	January 10	Montreal Wanderers	4–9	Toronto	3–2–0	6
6	January 13	Montreal Canadiens	6–2	Toronto	3–3–0	6
7	January 17	Toronto	5–1	Quebec Bulldogs	4–3–0	8
8	January 20	Toronto	6–8	Toronto 228th Battalion	4–4–0	8
9	January 24	Ottawa Senators	5–8	Toronto	5–4–0	10
10	January 27	Toronto	3–8	Montreal Wanderers	5–5–0	10

==== Second half ====
#	Date	Visitor	Score	Home	Record	Pts
1	January 31	Montreal Canadiens	2–6	Toronto	1–0–0	2
2	February 3	Toronto	3–7	Quebec Bulldogs	1–1–0	2
3	February 7	Toronto	4–3	Toronto 228th Battalion	2–1–0	4
4	February 10	Ottawa Senators	4–1	Toronto	2–2–0	4

- Toronto Blueshirts franchise suspended on February 11.

== See also ==
- 1916–17 NHA season
