= 1913–14 NHA season =

National Hockey Association season

- League: National Hockey Association
- Sport: Ice hockey
- Duration: December 27, 1913 – March 11, 1914
- Games: 20
- Teams: 6

Regular season
- Top scorer: Tommy Smith (39)

O'Brien Cup
- Champions: Toronto Hockey Club
- Runners-up: Montreal Wanderers

NHA seasons
- ← 1912–13 1914–15 →

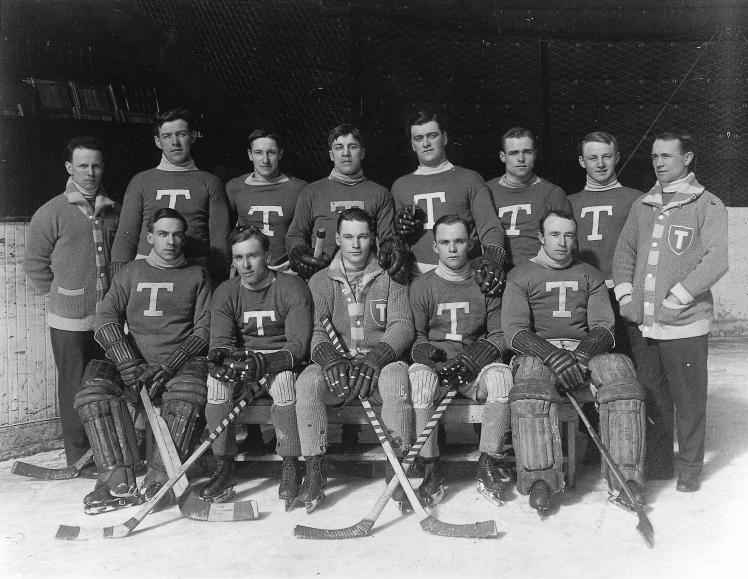
Toronto Blueshirts in 1913–14.

The 1913–14 NHA season was the fifth season of the National Hockey Association (NHA). At the end of the regular season, a tie for first place necessitated a playoff to determine the championship. The Toronto Hockey Club defeated the Montreal Canadiens 6–2 in a two-game, total-goals playoff. The Torontos then played the Victoria Aristocrats of the Pacific Coast Hockey Association (PCHA) in the first Stanley Cup 'World's Series' between the leagues.

== League business ==
=== Board of directors ===
- T. Emmett Quinn ( president)
- Percy J. Quinn, Toronto
- C. Irving, Ottawa
- Sam E. Lichtenhein, Wanderers

=== Rule Changes ===
The referees now would drop the puck, instead of placing it on the ice.

A goalkeeper lying down to stop a puck would receive a minor penalty and $2 fine.

Penalties were set at $2 fine for minor fouls. Major fouls would cost more per incident, starting at $3 and 5 minutes off, increasing to $5 and 10 minutes, and to $10 and a match penalty.

Deliberate injury was a $15 fine and banishment until the injured player returned to play.

Goalkeeper sticks now had a limit on their width of 3½ inches.

Assists were now to be recorded.

A dark line between the goal posts was now mandatory.

The first permanent, paid referees for the season were named:

- Leo Dandurand,
- Russell Bowie,
- Harvey Pulford,
- Bob Melville,
- Tom Melville,
- Reg Percival.

Source: Coleman(1966), pp. 248–249.

=== Peace with the PCHA and Maritime League ===
In the fall of 1913, the Pacific Coast Hockey Association (PCHA) and the NHA agreed to support a draft arrangement, whereby the PCHA could draft NHA players annually for four years. The PCHA would draft three players on a rotating basis among the NHA teams. Amateur players from west of Port Arthur, Ontario, would be considered to belong to the PCHA, and players east of Port Arthur to be considered NHA property. The first draft, in 1914, would have the PCHA select one player from Ottawa, one from Quebec, and one from the Wanderers.

The two leagues also agreed on arrangements to play off annually for the Stanley Cup. At the end of the 1913–14 season, the NHA champions would host the PCHA champions. The NHA would be responsible for arranging the series with the Stanley Cup trustees, something that they would neglect to do, leading to confusion over the first official series between the two leagues.

At the November 8, 1913, annual meeting, the NHA ratified the four-year working agreement with the PCHA and agreed on a similar deal with the Maritime League. The NHA gave up its claim on any players now employed by the MHL.

== Regular season ==
=== Highlights ===
On January 21, Tommy Smith would score nine goals for Quebec against the Wanderers. He would score 4 against the Canadiens on January 4. Newsy Lalonde would score six against Wanderers on January 10, and haunt the Wanderers with another five on February 11. Harry Hyland would score five in a game for the Wanderers against Toronto on March 4. Allan Davidson would score five against the Ontarios on January 21. Sprague Cleghorn would score five against Ontarios on December 27.

In the game of February 28 between Canadiens and Wanderers, the referee Leo Dandurand was assaulted by Canadiens manager George Kennedy.

The new arena at Quebec opened on December 30 with a game between Canadiens and Quebec. The first goal in the new building was scored by Jack Laviolette of Montreal, and won by Montreal 4–3. The game was marred by a match penalty to Newsy Lalonde for hitting Joe Hall in the head, opening a cut requiring eight stitches. On the return match at Montreal on January 14, Mr. Hall would charge Lalonde into the boards for a ten stitch wound.

The longest team winning streak was seven by Ottawa.

In the latter half of the season, the league banned checking into the boards. The rule was adopted permanently at a league meeting after the season.

=== Final standings ===
National Hockey Association
	GP	W	L	T	P	GF	GA
Toronto Hockey Club	20	13	7	0	26	93	65
Montreal Canadiens	20	13	7	0	26	85	65
Quebec Bulldogs	20	12	8	0	24	111	73
Ottawa Senators	20	11	9	0	22	65	71
Montreal Wanderers	20	7	13	0	14	102	125
Toronto Ontarios	20	4	16	0	8	61	118

Note: W = Wins, L = Losses, T = Ties, P = Points, GF= Goals For, GA = Goals Against

=== Results ===
Month	Day	Visitor	Score	Home	Score
Dec.	27	Quebec	3	Ottawa	2
Dec.	27	Ontarios	3	Wanderers	10
Dec.	27	Canadiens	0	Toronto	3
Dec.	30	Ottawa	2	Ontarios	3
Dec.	30	Canadiens	4	Quebec	3
Dec.	30	Toronto	3	Wanderers	7
Jan.	3	Wanderers	3	Ottawa	8
Jan.	3	Quebec	3	Toronto	6
Jan.	3	Ontarios	3	Canadiens	4
Jan.	7	Canadiens	0	Ottawa	6
Jan.	7	Quebec	4	Wanderers	3 (OT 18'5")
Jan.	7	Toronto	9	Ontarios	3
Jan.	10	Ottawa	3	Toronto	2 (OT 10')
Jan.	10	Ontarios	1	Quebec	6
Jan.	10	Wanderers	2	Canadiens	8
Jan.	14	Ontarios	5	Ottawa	6
Jan.	14	Quebec	3	Canadiens	4
Jan.	14	Wanderers	2	Toronto	10
Jan.	17	Ottawa	7	Wanderers	1
Jan.	17	Canadiens	9	Ontarios	3
Jan.	17	Toronto	9	Quebec	4
Jan.	21	Ottawa	3	Canadiens	2
Jan.	21	Wanderers	6	Quebec	12
Jan.	21	Ontarios	2	Toronto	9
Jan.	24	Toronto	1	Ottawa	4
Jan.	24	Quebec	1	Ontarios	4
Jan.	24	Canadiens	9	Wanderers	1
Jan.	28	Ottawa	1	Quebec	7
Jan.	28	Toronto	3	Canadiens	4
Jan.	28	Wanderers	8	Ontarios	9
Jan.	31	Quebec	3	Ottawa	4
Jan.	31	Canadiens	4	Ontarios	6
Jan.	31	Toronto	5	Wanderers	3
Feb.	4	Ottawa	1	Toronto	2
Feb.	4	Canadiens	1	Quebec	6
Feb.	4	Ontarios	1	Wanderers	3
Feb.	7	Wanderers	4	Ottawa	2
Feb.	7	Toronto	3	Canadiens	9
Feb.	7	Quebec	6	Ontarios	4
Feb.	11	Quebec	3	Toronto	4
Feb.	11	Ontarios	1	Ottawa	3
Feb.	11	Canadiens	6	Wanderers	2
Feb.	14	Ontarios	1	Toronto	3
Feb.	14	Ottawa	0	Canadiens	1 (OT 6'40")
Feb.	14	Wanderers	6	Quebec	7 (OT 7'15")
Feb.	18	Toronto	4	Ottawa	1
Feb.	18	Quebec	1	Canadiens	2
Feb.	18	Wanderers	11	Ontarios	3
Feb.	21	Ottawa	3	Wanderers	12
Feb.	21	Canadiens	2	Toronto	3
Feb.	21	Ontarios	3	Quebec	10
Feb.	25	Quebec	14	Wanderers	6
Feb.	25	Canadiens	5	Ottawa	6 (OT 15")
Feb.	25	Toronto	6	Ontarios	1
Feb.	28	Ottawa	3	Ontarios	2
Feb.	28	Toronto	3	Quebec	5
Feb.	28	Wanderers	5	Canadiens	6 (OT 2'20")
Mar.	4	Ottawa	0	Quebec	10
Mar.	4	Wanderers	7	Toronto	5
Mar.	4	Ontarios	3	Canadiens	5

Source: Coleman 1966

== Player statistics ==
=== Scoring leaders ===
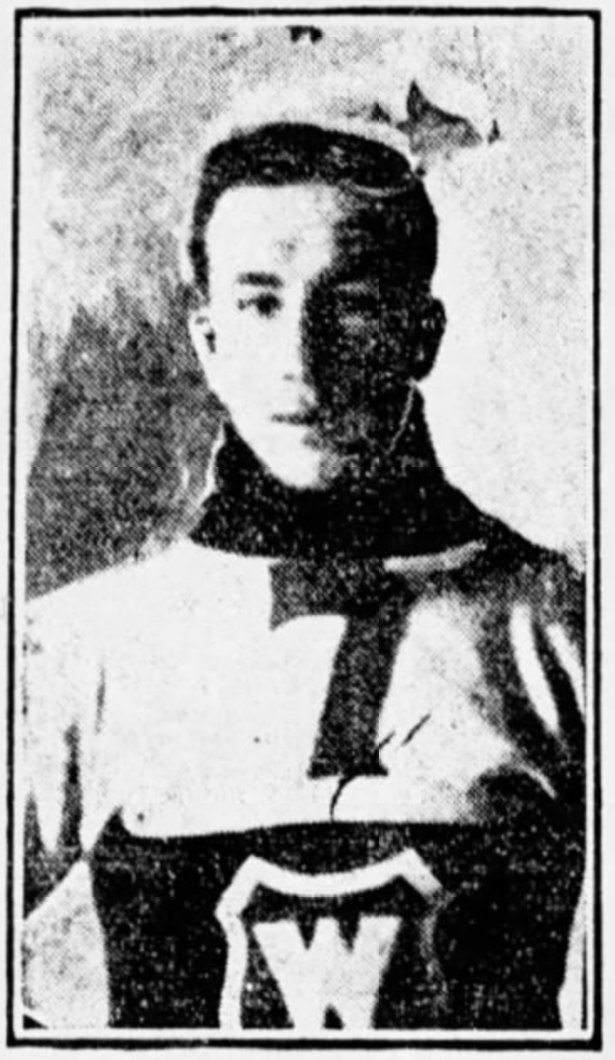
Harry Hyland, third in scoring.

Note: GP = Games played, G = Goals scored, A = Assists, Pts = Points, PIM = Penalties in minutes

Name	Club	GP	G	A	Pts	PIM
Tommy Smith	Quebec	20	39	6	45	35
Gordon Roberts	Wanderers	20	31	13	44	15
Harry Hyland	Wanderers	18	30	12	42	18
Scotty Davidson	Blueshirts	20	23	13	36	64
Jack Walker	Blueshirts	20	20	16	36	17
Jack McDonald	Ontarios	20	27	8	35	12
Didier Pitre	Quebec	17	24	4	28	20
Jack Darragh	Ottawa	20	23	5	28	69
Don Smith	Canadiens	20	18	10	28	18
Newsy Lalonde	Canadiens	14	22	5	27	23

=== Goaltending averages ===
Note: GP = Games played, GA = Goals against, SO = Shutouts, GAA = Goals against average

Name	Club	GP	GA	SO	GAA
Harry Holmes	Toronto	20	65	1	3.3
Georges Vezina	Canadiens	20	65	1	3.3
Clint Benedict	Ottawa	7	23		3.3
Paddy Moran	Quebec	20	73	1	3.7
Percy LeSueur	Ottawa	13	48	1	3.7
Reg Rankin	Ontarios	1	4		4.0
Billy Nicholson	Wanderers	10	52		5.2
Sammy Hebert	Ontarios	19	108		5.7
Jack Cross	Ontarios	1	6		6.0
Alex Leblanc	Wanderers	4	26		6.5
George Warwick	Wanderers	3	23		7.6
Art Boyce	Wanderers	3	24		8.0

== Playoffs ==
Tied at the top of the standings, the Blue shirts and Canadiens faced off in a two-game, total goals series to determine a league champion and holder of the Stanley Cup. The Blueshirts won the series 6–2.

=== Toronto Blueshirts vs. Montreal Canadiens ===
Date	Winning Team	Score	Losing Team	Location
March 7, 1914	Montreal Canadiens	2–0	Toronto HC	Montreal Arena
March 11, 1914	Toronto HC	6–0	Montreal Canadiens	Arena Gardens
Toronto wins total goals series 6 goals to 2. Toronto HC wins the O'Brien Cup and the Stanley Cup.

March 7, 1914
Toronto HC	0		Montreal Canadiens	2
Harry Holmes		G	Georges Vezina	
Jack Marshall		P	Ernest Dubeau	
Harry Camereon		CP	Jack Laviolette	
Frank Froyston		C	Donald Smith	1
Allan "Scotty" Davidson, Capt.		RW	Edouard "Newsy" Lalonde	
Jack Walker		LW	Harry Scott	1
Roy McGiffen -RO		sub	Eugene Payan -C	
Carol “Cully” Wilson -RW		sub	Louis Berlinguette -LW	

- Spares Toronto - Con Corbeau -P George McNamara -CP, Claude Wilson -G
- Spares Montreal - Hector Dallaire -RW, Jimmy Gardner LW-Captain, Alponse Jette -RW

March 11, 1914
Montreal Canadiens	0		Toronto HC	6
Georges Vezina		G	Harry Holmes	
Ernest Dubeau		P	Jack Marshall	
Jack Laviolette		CP	Harry Cameron	
Donald Smith		C	Frank Froyston	1
Edouard "Newsy" Lalonde		RW	Allan "Scotty" Davidson, Capt.	2
Harry Scott		LW	Jack Walker	3
Eugene Payan -C		sub	Roy McGiffen -RO	
Louis Berlinguette -LW		sub	Carol “Cully” Wilson -RW	

- Spares Toronto - Con Corbeau -P George McNamara -CP, Claude Wilson -G
- Spares Montreal - Hector Dallaire -RW, Jimmy Gardner LW-Captain, Alponse Jette -RW

=== Victoria vs. Toronto ===
Nearing the end of the season, the NHA made arrangements for the NHA champion to receive a challenge from the Sydney Millionaires, Maritime champions, ordered by the Stanley Cup trustees. As arranged by the NHA, the series would have taken place on March 9 through 11. After that, the winner would face off in a series with the PCHA champions in Toronto. The tie in the NHA standings meant that the March 9–11 dates would be postponed. Montreal Canadiens and Toronto Blueshirts met March 7 in Montreal and March 11 in Toronto to determine the NHA Champion and new Stanley Cup Champion. The challenge series against Sydney Millionaires was cancelled.

After dispatching the Canadiens, the Blue Shirts faced off against the Victoria Aristocrats of the Pacific Coast Hockey Association. A controversy erupted when a letter arrived from the Stanley Cup trustees on March 17, stating that the trustees would not let the Stanley Cup travel west, as they did not consider Victoria a proper challenger because they had not formally notified the trustees. However, on March 18, Trustee William Foran stated that it was a misunderstanding. PCHA president Frank Patrick had not filed a challenge, because he had expected Emmett Quinn of the NHA to make all of the arrangements in his role as hockey commissioner, whereas the trustees thought they were being deliberately ignored. In any case, all arrangements had been ironed out and the series was accepted.

Several days later, trustee William Foran wrote to NHA president Emmett Quinn that the trustees are "perfectly satisfied to allow the representatives of the three pro leagues (NHA, PCHA and Maritime) to make all arrangements each season as to the series of matches to be played for the Cup."

Total attendance for the series was 14,260 for an average of 4,753 in the 7,500 capacity Arena. At the time, professional hockey was less of a draw than Ontario Hockey Association (OHA) senior hockey. Two games between local OHA senior teams had combined to exceed 14,000 total attendance. The Torontos players and staff received $297 each as their share of the gate receipts.

Date	Winning Team	Score	Losing Team	League	Notes
March 14, 1914	Toronto HC	5–2	Victoria Aristocrats	NHA	
March 17, 1914	Toronto HC	6–5	Victoria Aristocrats	PCHA	OT 18:00
March 19, 1914	Toronto HC	2–1	Victoria Aristocrats	NHA	
Toronto wins best-of-five series 3 games to 0

All games played at Arena Gardens.

== Post-season exhibitions ==
The Vancouver Millionaires travelled east and played exhibition games in Ottawa, Montreal and Quebec. Following these games, the St. Nicholas Rink of New York City sponsored a three-team tournament between the Montreal Wanderers, Quebec Bulldogs and the Millionaires for a prize of US$5,000 (equivalent to $160,714 in 2025). After a round-robin round eliminated the Millionaires, the Wanderers defeated Quebec in a two-game total-goals final 15–12 (9–4, 6–8). The Wanderers then played the Millionaires in a two-game series in Boston.

== Stanley Cup engraving ==
The 1914 Stanley Cup was presented by the trophy's trustee William Foran.

1914 Toronto Hockey Club (Blueshirts)
Players
Forwards
5 Frank Foyston (center)
3 Allan Scotty Davidson (Captain) (right wing)
James Harriston (left wing) †
Roy McGiffen (right wing-rover) ‡
7 Jack Walker (left wing-center)
Defencemen
Jack Marshall (Point) ₳
Connie Con Corbeau (Point)
2 Harry Cameron (Cover point)
4 George McNamara (Cover point)
Goaltender
1 Harry Hap Holmes
1 Claude Wilson (sub)

† missing from the team picture

‡ also played rover in the Stanley Cup Final

₳ Playing-Manager

non-players =

- Frank Robinson (Owner) †
- Percy Quinn (President/Owner) †
- Dick Carroll (Trainer)
- Frank Carroll (Asst Trainer)

† missing from the team picture

engraving notes =

- Originally engraved "Torontos 1913-14/Defeated Victorias B.C./3 straight games"
- "1914 Toronto H.C." is engraved on the 1947 ring connecting the upper trophy to the barrel

== See also ==
- National Hockey Association
- List of pre-NHL seasons
- List of Stanley Cup champions
- 1913–14 PCHA season

Preceded by Quebec Bulldogs; 1913	Toronto Hockey Club; Stanley Cup champions 1914	Succeeded by Vancouver Millionaires; 1915
Preceded by 1912–13 NHA season	NHA seasons 1913–14	Succeeded by 1914–15 NHA season
