= Jack Cross (ice hockey) =

Canadian ice hockey player

- Born: August 19, 1887; Ingersoll, Ontario, Canada
- Died: November 16, 1948 (aged 61)
- Position: Goaltender
- Played for: Toronto Ontarios; Moncton Victorias
- Playing career: 1904–1915

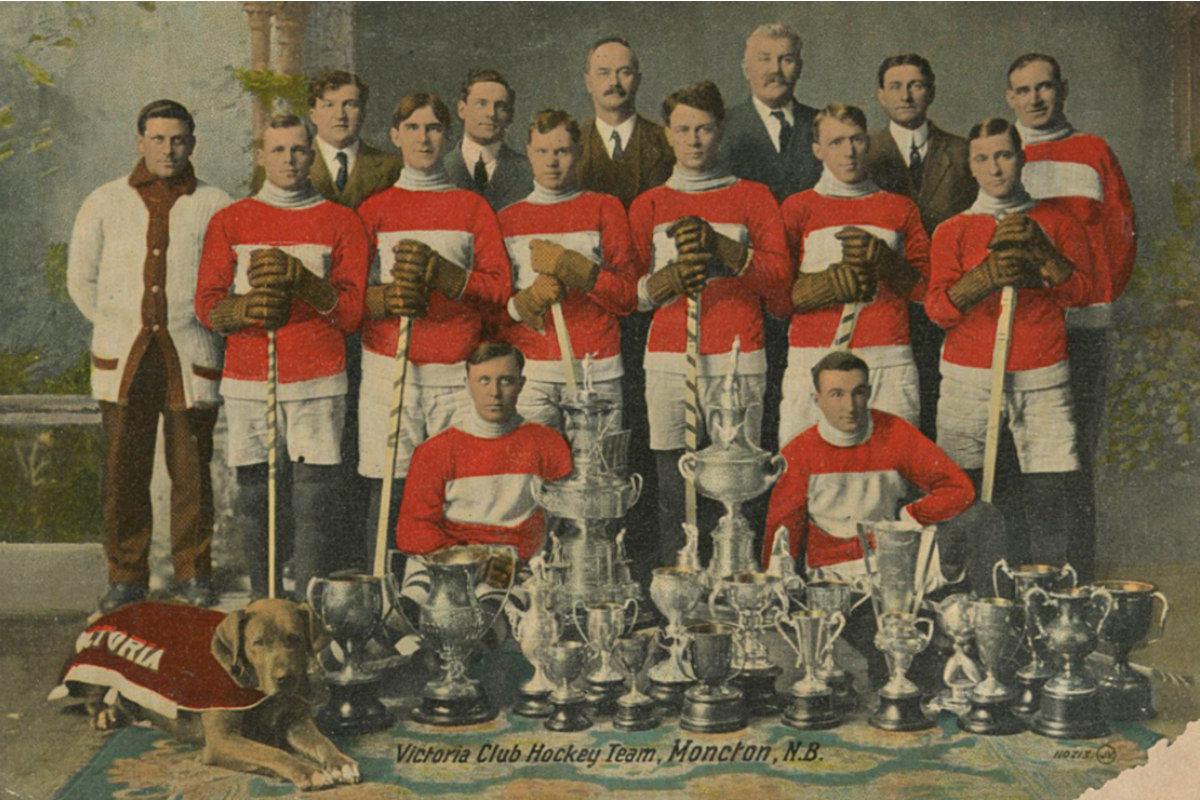
Cross, third standing redshirted player from left, with the Moncton Victorias in 1912–13.

John Albert Cross (August 19, 1887 – November 16, 1948) was a Canadian professional ice hockey player.

== Career ==
Cross played most notably with the Toronto Ontarios of the National Hockey Association in 1913–14. He also played with the Moncton Victorias in the Maritime Professional Hockey League.
