= Jack Walker (ice hockey) =

Canadian ice hockey player (1888–1950)

- Hockey Hall of Fame, 1960
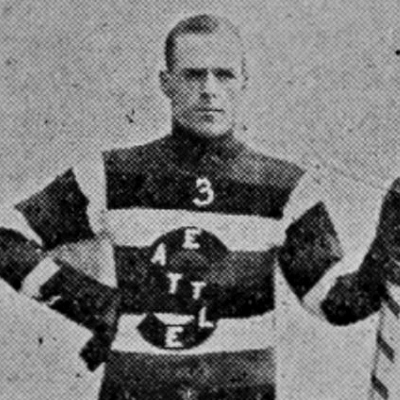
- Walker with the Seattle Metropolitans.
- Born: November 29, 1888 Silver Mountain, Ontario, Canada
- Died: February 16, 1950 (aged 61) Seattle, Washington, U.S.
- Height: 5 ft 8 in (173 cm)
- Weight: 153 lb (69 kg; 10 st 13 lb)
- Position: Rover/Winger
- Shot: Left
- Played for: Oakland Sheiks; Hollywood Stars; Seattle Eskimos; Detroit Cougars; Victoria Cougars; Seattle Metropolitans; Moncton Victorias; Toronto Blueshirts; Port Arthur Lake City
- Playing career: 1907–1933

John Phillip Walker (November 29, 1888 – February 16, 1950) was a Canadian professional ice hockey forward who played for the Toronto Blueshirts, Seattle Metropolitans, Victoria Cougars, and Detroit Cougars. He played in all the big professional leagues at the time: the National Hockey Association (NHA), Pacific Coast Hockey Association (PCHA), Western Canada Hockey League (WCHL), and National Hockey League (NHL).

Walker won three Stanley Cups in his career: in 1914 with the Toronto Blueshirts, in 1917 with the Seattle Metropolitans, and in 1925 with the Victoria Cougars. Goaltender Harry "Hap" Holmes and forward Frank Foyston were his teammates on all three Stanley Cup winning teams. Walker is one of only 11 players in Stanley Cup history to win the Cup with three or more different teams.

Outside of his three Stanley Cup victories Walker also appeared in four other instances where his team played for the Stanley Cup, either in challenge games or in Stanley Cup series: in 1911 with Port Arthur Lake City, in 1919 and 1920 with the Seattle Metropolitans, and in 1926 with the Victoria Cougars. In 1911, 1920 and 1926 he was on the losing side of either the challenge game or the series, and in 1919 the Stanley Cup series between the Seattle Metropolitans and the Montreal Canadiens was cancelled because of the Spanish flu pandemic.

== Biography ==
=== Port Arthur ===
Born in Silver Mountain, Ontario Walker grew up in Port Arthur, Ontario (present day Thunder Bay), where his parents had lived since 1870. He played with the Port Arthur Lake City team in the New Ontario Hockey League (NOHL) from 1907 to 1912. On March 16, 1911, he and teammate Eddie Carpenter played for the Port Arthur Hockey Club against the Ottawa Senators of the National Hockey Association (NHA) for the Stanley Cup. Carpenter and Walker each scored a goal, but the Port Arthur team lost 4–13 in front of 3,000 spectators at the Laurier Avenue Arena in Ottawa.

Impressed by Walker's play in the Stanley Cup challenge game the Ottawa Senators tried to land him for the 1911–12 season, but Walker declined the offer as he thought Port Arthur had a strong enough team to again compete for the Stanley Cup. For the 1911–12 season future Hockey Hall of Fame members Harry Cameron and Frank Nighbor joined the Port Arthur team from Pembroke, Ontario, but after the team defeated the Saskatoon Wholesalers 12-6 (11–1, 1–5) in a qualifying two-game series on March 2 and 4, 1912 for a chance to challenge the National Hockey Association champions (Quebec Bulldogs) for the Stanley Cup, Port Arthur nonetheless turned down the opportunity because they felt they had practically no chance to defeat the NHA champions.

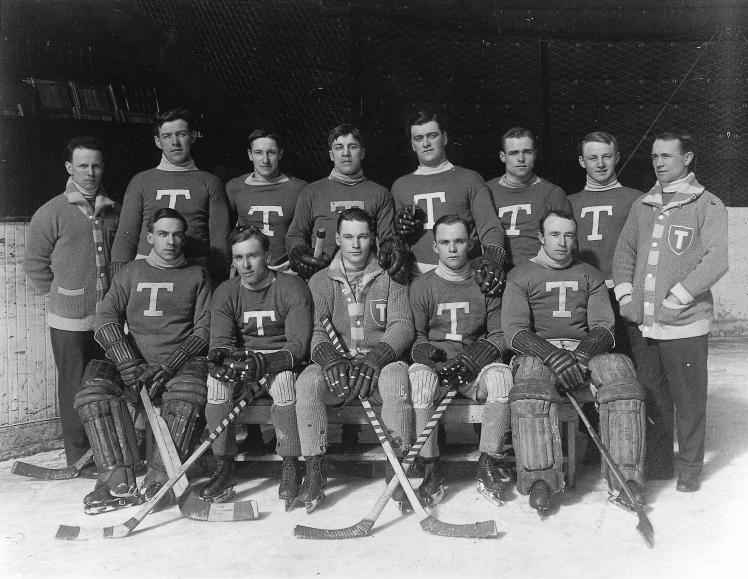
Walker, third from the right in the back row, with the 1913–14 Toronto Blueshirts.

=== Toronto Blueshirts ===
During the 1912–13 season, Walker and Eddie Carpenter played for the Moncton Victorias of the Maritime Professional Hockey League (MaPHL), and Walker also played one initial game with the Toronto Blueshirts of the NHA. Walker had first signed a contract with the Toronto club for the 1912–13 NHA season, but jumped contract to Moncton along with Fred Doherty after only one game in the NHA for a higher salary in the Maritimes. In 1913–14 Walker became a full time member of the Toronto Blueshirts.

Back in Toronto Walker helped the 1913–14 Toronto Blueshirts win the Stanley Cup by defeating the Montreal Canadiens. The two teams tied each other for first place in the NHA, and Toronto won the deciding playoffs 6-2 (0–2, 6–0) over two games on March 7 and 11. The Blueshirts then defeated the Victoria Aristocrats, champions of the Pacific Coast Hockey Association (PCHA), in three straight games 5–2, 6-5 and 2-1 between March 14 to 19.

Walker played with the Toronto Blueshirts also in 1914–15, but prior to the 1915–16 season Lester and Frank Patrick, the men behind the PCHA, took advantage of a turbulent situation in the NHA when Major Frank Robinson, owner of the Blueshirts, was about to sell his team to join the military. The Patricks raided the Blueshirts and created a new PCHA team in the Seattle Metropolitans, stocking it with Walker, Eddie Carpenter, Harry "Hap" Holmes, Frank Foyston and Carol "Cully" Wilson.

=== Seattle Metropolitans ===
In his second season with the Metropolitans, in 1916–17, Walker helped the American team to a first-place finish in the PCHA, in front of the Vancouver Millionaires, Portland Rosebuds and Spokane Canaries. In the following Stanley Cup Final series the Metropolitans defeated the Montreal Canadiens of the NHA 3 games to 1 to claim the Stanley Cup, making it the first time an American team had won the coveted trophy.

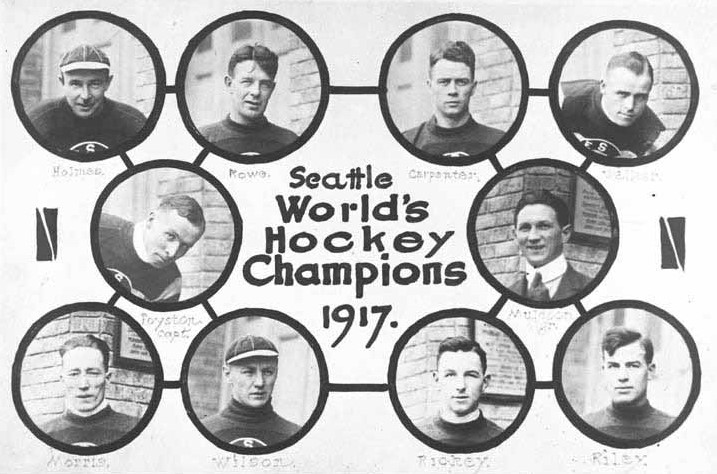
Walker, in the upper right corner, with the 1916–17 Seattle Metropolitans.

World War I had a big impact on the game, and prior to the 1917–18 season Walker and Eddie Carpenter were stuck in Port Arthur working on a dry dock. They had been given exemption from the war on the condition that they continued with their employment in the city, which held them out from rejoining the Metropolitans in the PCHA. Walker and Carpenter instead played with different Port Arthur teams in the NOHL.

Back in the PCHA for the 1918–19 season Walker again helped the Metropolitans reach the Stanley Cup Final, a rematch against the Montreal Canadiens from two seasons prior. The 1919 series was a more even affair than the 1917 series but had to be cancelled with the teams tied at 2–2 in the best-of-five format due to the Spanish flu pandemic when several players on the Canadiens ended up sick in hospital. Joe Hall, a Hockey Hall of Fame defenseman on the Canadiens team, subsequently died of pneumonia, related to his influenza, in a hospital in Seattle on April 5, only four days after the series had been cancelled.

In 1919–20 Walker again helped the Metropolitans to the Stanley Cup Final, this time against the Ottawa Senators. The Senators, led offensively by Frank Nighbor, Walker's old teammate from Port Arthur during the 1911–12 season, won the series 3 games to 2 after a 6-1 decision in game five on April 1, 1920.

=== Victoria Cougars ===
Walker played four more seasons with the Metropolitans, but when the team folded after the 1923–24 season Walker, along with his longtime teammates Hap Holmes and Frank Foyston, joined the Victoria Cougars in the Western Canada Hockey League for the 1924–25 season. The Cougars, led offensively by their Icelandic-Canadian star forward Frank Fredrickson, only finished third in the 1924–25 WCHL standings, but they succeeded in winning the following league playoffs (defeating both the Saskatoon Crescents and the Calgary Tigers) which gave them the opportunity to play NHL champion Montreal Canadiens for the Stanley Cup. Walker, who had a modest regular season offensively speaking with the Cougars, turned it on for the playoffs, scoring 4 goals during the WCHL playoffs and 4 goals in the Stanley Cup Final, helping the Cougars defeat the Canadiens 3 games to 1 while being matched against the Canadiens young star forward Howie Morenz. The 1925 Victoria Cougars were the last non-NHL team to win the Stanley Cup.

In 1926 the team was back in the Stanley Cup Final after winning the WHL playoffs, but the Montreal Maroons of the NHL were too difficult to overcome, winning the series 3 games to 1, with Montreal goaltender Clint Benedict recording three shutouts in the series.

=== Later life ===
When the WHL folded after the 1925–26 season Walker moved along with the Victoria Cougars to Detroit and the NHL where the team became the Detroit Cougars. Walker, then aged 37, played two seasons with the Detroit Cougars in the NHL before he headed back to Seattle where he played three seasons with the Seattle Eskimos of the Pacific Coast Hockey League. During the 1931–32 and 1932–33 seasons Walker was a playing manager for the Hollywood Stars and the Oakland Sheiks respectively in the California Hockey League, a league where several other old PCHA stars such as Moose Johnson, Lloyd Cook and Fred "Smokey" Harris also played during their twilight years.

After his playing career Walker stayed on the West Coast where he was active as an ice hockey coach. He finally settled down in Seattle where he died on February 16, 1950, at the age of 61.

He was inducted posthumously into the Hockey Hall of Fame in 1960.

== Playing style ==
"Walker, at rover, is a crackerjack, his skating and use of the famous poke check making him the most conspicuous figure on the ice."

— Ottawa Journal on Walker after the March 16, 1911 Stanley Cup challenge game between the Ottawa Senators and Port Arthur.

During his hockey career Walker played mostly as a rover (the archaic seven man game forward position between defense and the centre forward) or, in the six man game against opponents from the NHA, as a winger. He was a good stick-handler and had much speed, something which both the Ottawa Journal and the Ottawa Citizen complimented him on after the Port Arthur Lake City aggregation played the Ottawa Senators for the Stanley Cup on March 16, 1911.

"Johnny Walker, the rover, a Port Arthur boy, in his 21st year, was by a wide margin the finest of the visitors. Walker has speed to burn, handles the stick neatly and checks with the sure sign every time. He never fagged and was up and back with almost every rush of the night."

— Ottawa Citizen on Walker after the March 16, 1911, Stanley Cup challenge game between the Ottawa Senators and Port Arthur.

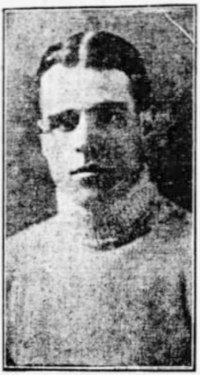
Walker with Port Arthur Lake City in the early 1910s.

Walker was a prominent two-way player who could make a difference at both ends of the rink, and he is often credited with introducing the hook check (a defensive technique in which the player sweeps or hooks his stick low to the ice in an effort to remove the puck from an opponent's stick) to the game of hockey. Walker's forward teammate on the 1911–12 Port Arthur Lake City team Frank Nighbor was another defensive specialist during the same era who excelled at both the poke check (Note: The hook check and the poke check despite being two different checks were quite similar in nature, and the two names were sometimes used interchangeably in contemporary newspaper reports.) and the sweep check. In a 1960 interview with Bill Westwick of the Ottawa Journal, Nighbor claimed he had learned his famous poke checking technique by watching Walker while the two players were teammates in Port Arthur.

One instance in which Walker used his hook check with great success was during the 1917 Stanley Cup Final against the Montreal Canadiens. The Canadiens had won the first game of the best-of-five series 8 goals to 4, but in game two Walker used his hook check effectively on Didier Pitre, one of the star forwards on the Montreal team who had scored four goals in the first game, helping his team hold the Canadiens to only one goal in a 6–1 victory. The Seattle Metropolitans then won game three 4-1 and game four 9–1, becoming the first American team in history to win the Stanley Cup.

Whether or not Walker came up with his hook checking technique by himself, or if he drew inspiration from contemporary players, is disputed. Both Joel Rochon and William "Bud" Saurel, (Note: Name also spelled Sorel in newspaper reports.) two players from Fort William whom Walker played against in the NOHL, claimed to have originated the check. Rochon's claim was echoed by Fort William native Hockey Hall of Fame member Jack Adams who claimed Frank Nighbor must have learned his poke check after having played against Rochon and Fort William in the NOHL, something Nighbor himself denied. Harry Scott, a teammate of Walker with the 1912–13 Moncton Victorias and an opponent of him in the NOHL between 1907 and 1911, claimed that it was "Bud" Saurel who had taught Walker the check.

In an era that was known for a lot of on-ice violence Walker was known as a clean and gentlemanly player, which reflected not only in a comparatively low amount of penalty minutes but also in a comparatively low amount of serious injuries. One serious injury he did suffer happened during the 1921–22 season when he was hit over his already injured left hand in a game in Victoria on February 10 and blood-poisoning set in to the wound. He was taken to General Hospital in Vancouver where on February 13 he was operated on, and he later came back and finished the season.

Lester Patrick, the hockey mogul behind the PCHA and later a two-time Stanley Cup winning coach with the New York Rangers, had high praise for Walker, calling him "one of the greatest players who ever lived" in a 1950 Maclean's magazine interview, but he also stated that in comparison with contemporary players like Cyclone Taylor, Frank Nighbor, Howie Morenz, Eddie Shore, Moose Johnson, Ching Johnson and Frank Fredrickson, Walker, much like his Seattle Metropolitans teammate Frank Foyston, "lacked color" and "no matter how brilliant he was, he didn't bring the crowd to their feet."

== Career statistics ==
=== Regular season and playoffs ===
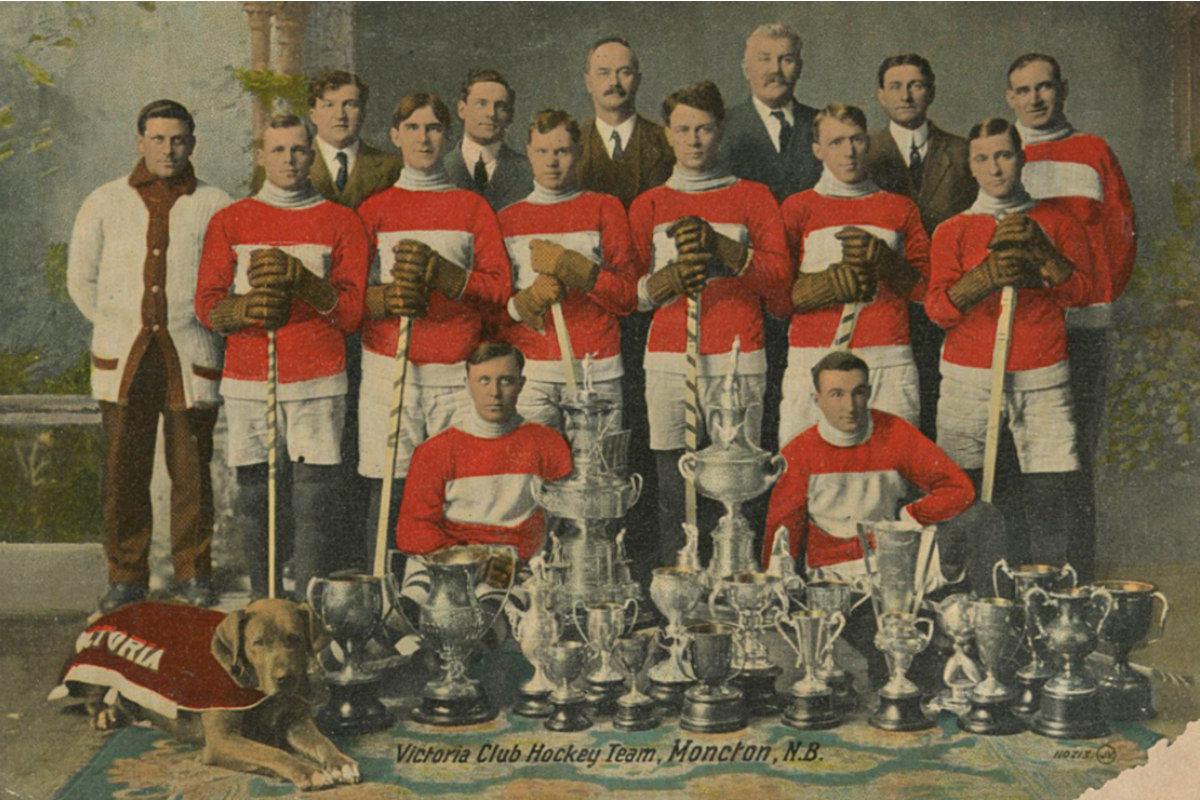
Walker, first player from left, with the Moncton Victorias in 1912–13.

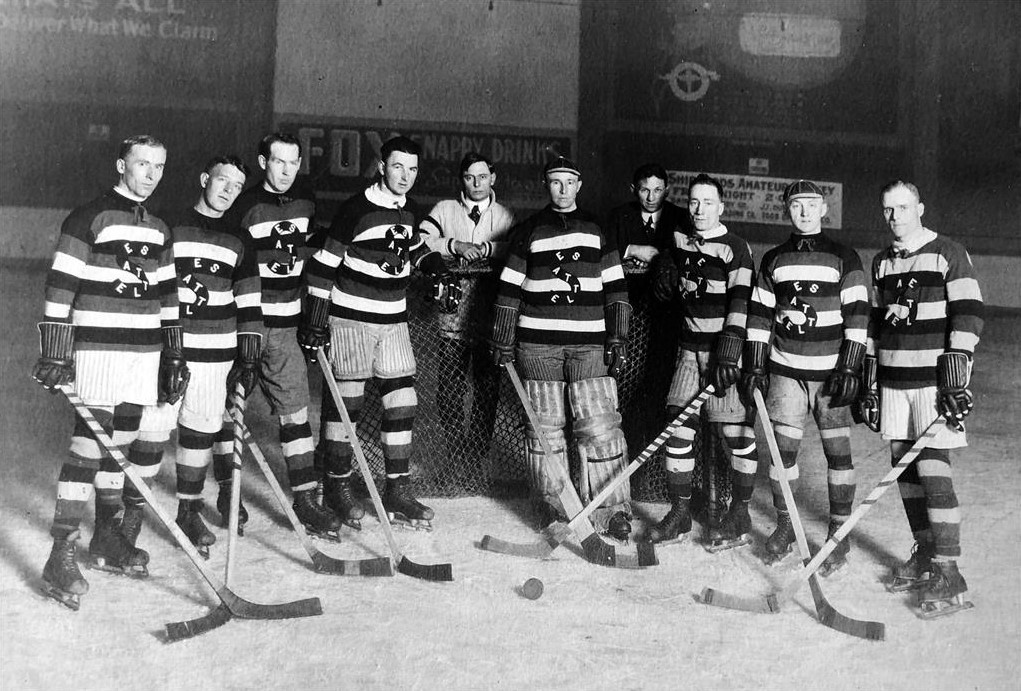
Walker, far right, with the Seattle Metropolitans in 1919.

			Regular season					Playoffs
Season	Team	League	GP	G	A	Pts	PIM	GP	G	A	Pts	PIM
1907–08	Port Arthur Lake City	NOHL	6	3	0	3	—	—	—	—	—	—
1908–09	Port Arthur Lake City	NOHL	12	8	0	8	—	—	—	—	—	—
1909–10	Port Arthur Lake City	NOHL	12	20	0	20	21	—	—	—	—	—
1910–11	Port Arthur Lake City	NOHL	14	30	0	30	—	2	2	0	2	0
1910–11	Port Arthur Lake City	St-Cup	—	—	—	—	—	1	1	0	1	0
1911–12	Port Arthur Lake City	NOHL	13	17	0	17	—	2	3	0	3	0
1912–13	Toronto Blueshirts	NHA	1	0	0	0	0	—	—	—	—	—
1912–13	Moncton Victorias	MPHL	15	21	0	21	9	—	—	—	—	—
1913–14	Toronto Blueshirts	NHA	20	20	16	36	17	2	3	0	3	2
1913–14	Toronto Blueshirts	St-Cup	—	—	—	—	—	2	3	0	3	2
1914–15	Toronto Blueshirts	NHA	19	12	7	19	11	—	—	—	—	—
1915–16	Seattle Metropolitans	PCHA	18	13	6	19	6	—	—	—	—	—
1916–17	Seattle Metropolitans	PCHA	24	11	15	26	3	—	—	—	—	—
1916–17	Seattle Metropolitans	St-Cup	—	—	—	—	—	4	1	2	3	0
1917–18	Port Arthur Lake City	NOHL	8	22	0	22	—	—	—	—	—	—
1918–19	Seattle Metropolitans	PCHA	20	9	6	15	9	2	0	2	2	0
1918–19	Seattle Metropolitans	St-Cup	—	—	—	—	—	5	3	0	3	9
1919–20	Seattle Metropolitans	PCHA	22	4	8	12	3	2	1	1	2	0
1919–20	Seattle Metropolitans	St-Cup	—	—	—	—	—	5	1	3	4	0
1920–21	Seattle Metropolitans	PCHA	23	6	4	10	6	2	0	0	0	0
1921–22	Seattle Metropolitans	PCHA	20	8	4	12	0	2	0	0	0	0
1922–23	Seattle Metropolitans	PCHA	29	13	10	23	4	—	—	—	—	—
1923–24	Seattle Metropolitans	PCHA	29	18	5	23	0	2	0	1	1	0
1924–25	Victoria Cougars	WCHL	28	7	7	14	6	4	4	0	4	0
1924–25	Victoria Cougars	St-Cup	—	—	—	—	—	4	4	2	6	0
1925–26	Victoria Cougars	WHL	30	9	8	17	16	4	0	0	0	2
1925–26	Victoria Cougars	St-Cup	—	—	—	—	—	4	0	0	0	0
1926–27	Detroit Cougars	NHL	37	3	4	7	6	—	—	—	—	—
1927–28	Detroit Cougars	NHL	43	2	4	6	12	—	—	—	—	—
1928–29	Seattle Eskimos	PCHL	34	5	8	13	4	5	0	2	2	2
1929–30	Seattle Eskimos	PCHL	26	6	11	17	2	—	—	—	—	—
1930–31	Seattle Eskimos	PCHL	34	2	13	15	8	4	0	3	3	0
1931–32	Hollywood Stars	Cal-Pro		5	13	18		—	—	—	—	—
1932–33	Oakland Sheiks	Cal-Pro						—	—	—	—	—
NOHL totals			65	100	–	100	–	–	–	–	–	–
NHA totals			40	32	23	55	28	2	3	0	3	2
PCHA totals			186	82	58	140	31	10	1	4	5	0
WCHL/WHL totals			58	16	15	31	22	8	4	0	4	2
NHL totals			80	5	8	13	18	—	—	—	—	—
St-Cup totals			—	—	—	—	—	26	11	7	18	12

== Awards and achievements ==
- Stanley Cup – 1914 with Toronto Blueshirts, 1917 with Seattle Metropolitans and 1925 with Victoria Cougars
- PCHA First All-Star Team – 1920–21, 1921–22 and 1923–24
- PCHA Second All-Star Team – 1916–17, 1918–19 and 1919–20
