= Scotty Davidson =

Canadian ice hockey player (1891–1915)

- Hockey Hall of Fame, 1950
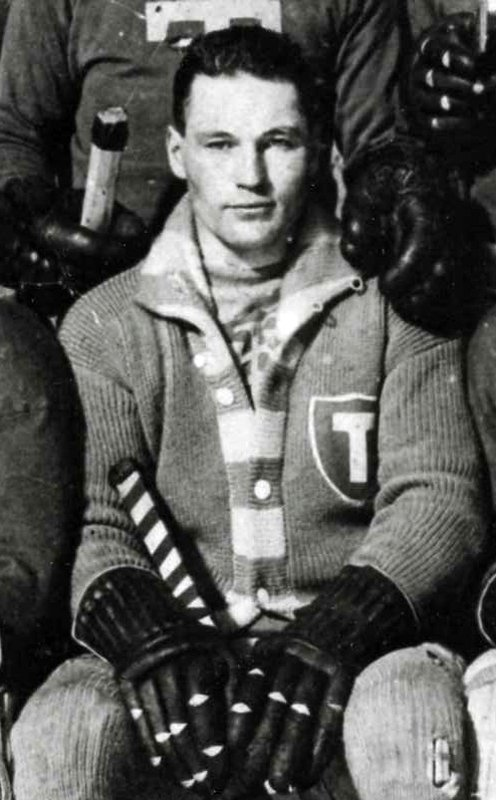
- Born: March 6, 1891 Kingston, Ontario, Canada
- Died: June 16, 1915 (aged 24) Belgium
- Height: 6 ft 1 in (185 cm)
- Weight: 195 lb (88 kg; 13 st 13 lb)
- Position: Right wing/Defence
- Shot: Right
- Played for: Toronto Blueshirts
- Playing career: 1912–1914

Allan McLean "Scotty" Davidson (March 6, 1891 – June 16, 1915) was a Canadian ice hockey player and soldier. He was considered one of the top wingers of the game's early years. He led his Kingston junior team to two Ontario Hockey Association championships in 1910 and 1911, when he moved to Calgary for the 1911–12 season and led the Calgary Athletics senior team to the Alberta provincial championship. Davidson turned professional with the Toronto Blueshirts in 1912 and was among the National Hockey Association's leading scorers the following two seasons. He captained Toronto to the Stanley Cup championship in 1914.

Upon the outbreak of the First World War in 1914, Davidson volunteered with the Canadian Expeditionary Force; he was the first professional hockey player to do so. He was killed in action on 16 June 1915, while fighting in Belgium. Hailed as a hero by his peers, Davidson was said to have been killed after refusing to retreat during a battle. A military record reports he was "killed instantly by a shell which exploded near him in the trench." He is commemorated on the Canadian National Vimy Memorial. Davidson was posthumously inducted into the Hockey Hall of Fame in 1950.

== Playing career ==
Allan McLean Davidson was born on March 6, 1891, and raised in Kingston, Ontario. He was fourth of five children born to John and Harriet Davidson. He learned the game through his coach, James T. Sutherland. Born Allan Davidson, he acquired the nickname "Scotty" due to his Scottish Highland heritage. He first played in the Ontario Hockey Association (OHA) senior division in 1908–09 where, as a 17-year-old, he led the league with eight goals in four games. He joined the Kingston Frontenacs of the OHA junior division in 1909 where he emerged as a top player in the league. He was known for his shooting ability and was considered a strong backchecker. Davidson served as team captain, and led the Frontenacs to OHA junior titles in 1910 and 1911. He was a standout in the 1911 championship, leading his team back from a 3–0 deficit to win the game.

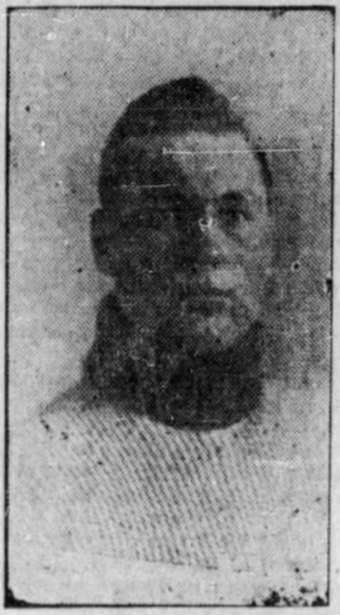
Davidson with the Calgary Athletic Club in 1911–12

After leaving the junior game, Davidson moved to Alberta where he played senior hockey for the Calgary Athletics. He scored three goals in four regular season games and added another three goals in three playoff games. The Athletics won the provincial championship, but were defeated by the Winnipeg Victorias for the Allan Cup. While with the Calgary Athletics Davidson played defence (either point or cover point).

He returned to Ontario for the 1912–13 season when he was signed by the Toronto Blueshirts of the National Hockey Association (NHA). Davidson made his professional debut with Toronto in their season-opening loss to the Montreal Canadiens, and finished his rookie season with 19 goals in 20 games, second on the team behind Frank Nighbor. He started the season on defence (point), the same position he had played the previous season in Calgary, but was soon switched to right wing.

The Blueshirts named him team captain for the 1913–14 season, and he responded by finishing in the top ten in NHA goals with 23 and second in assists with 13. Tied atop the standings with the Montreal Canadiens after the regular season, the Blueshirts faced the Canadiens in a two-game, total-goal series for both the O'Brien Cup, the NHA championship, and control of the Stanley Cup, the Canadian championship. Following a 2–0 loss at Montreal, Davidson played a key role in Toronto's 6–0 victory in the return match. He scored two goals, including Toronto's third which clinched the championship. The title represented the first time a team from Toronto won the Stanley Cup.

The Blueshirts then immediately faced the Victoria Aristocrats of the Pacific Coast Hockey Association held in March 1914. It was considered an unofficial challenge for the Stanley Cup as the Aristocrats failed to arrange the series with the Cup's trustees. Toronto emerged with three consecutive victories to win the series that was on occasion violent – Davidson was involved in a fight late in the third game that touched off a melee involving most players for both teams.

== Military career ==
When the First World War broke out in 1914, Davidson was the first professional hockey player to volunteer with the Canadian Expeditionary Force, enlisting on September 22, 1914 with the 14th Regiment. Upon arrival in Europe the regiment was broken up and Davidson was reassigned to the Eastern Ontario Regiment of the Canadian Infantry, joining his former teammate George Richardson. During the war Davidson was promoted to lance-corporal. While on his way to England on the steamer SS Cassandra Davidson showed off his athletic skills by winning the championship in a big boxing tournament held on the boat, defeating David Carson of Kingston, Ontario in the finals.

Davidson earned the respect of his fellow soldiers who wrote of his bravery and fearlessness. He once rescued a wounded officer while fighting in France, and one account of his death asserts that he was shot in the back and killed while attempting to carry an injured soldier to safety. Another account held that he died while on a bombing raid after refusing to retreat until he had spent his ammunition. He was said to have used his final grenade to kill a German officer before being killed himself. Yet another version of Davidson's death was reported in the August 18, 1915 issue of the Calgary Daily Herald and claimed Davidson was sitting in the trenches playing cards with four other soldiers when a shell dropped in the midst of the party killing Davidson and his friends. Contemporary reports suggested that had Davidson lived through the attack, he may have been awarded the Distinguished Conduct Medal or even the Victoria Cross.

== Legacy ==
By the time he left hockey to fight in the war, Davidson was considered one of the top all-around players in the NHA. Noted for his skating ability, it was said that he could skate faster backwards than most players could forwards. In 1925, Maclean's named him the top right wing when it determined its all-star team of the game's greatest players, an opinion shared by his former junior coach, who stated that he was "as good as any player to ever patrol a wing position".

Davidson was inducted into the Hockey Hall of Fame in 1950, and is honoured by the International Hockey Hall of Fame. The Kingston Frontenacs erected a monument to his memory shortly after his death. He was 23 years old when he was killed, and his name is commemorated on the Canadian National Vimy Memorial in France.

== Career statistics ==
			Regular season					Playoffs
Season	Team	League	GP	G	A	Pts	PIM	GP	G	A	Pts	PIM
1908–09	Kingston 14th Regiment	OHA Sr	4	8	0	8	11	4	4	0	4	6
1909–10	Kingston Frontenacs	OHA Jr	—	—	—	—	—	—	—	—	—	—
1910–11	Kingston Frontenacs	OHA Jr	—	—	—	—	—	—	—	—	—	—
1911–12	Calgary Athletics	SASHL	4	3	0	3	—	3	3	0	3	6
1912–13	Toronto Blueshirts	NHA	20	19	0	19	69	—	—	—	—	—
1913–14	Toronto Blueshirts	NHA	20	23	13	36	64	4	3	0	3	18
NHA totals			40	42	13	55	133	4	3	0	3	18

== See also ==
- List of ice hockey players who died during their playing career
