= Toronto Blueshirts =

Ice hockey team

Toronto Hockey Club
- List of Toronto Hockey Club seasons
- Founded: 1911
- History: Toronto H.C. 1912–1917
- Home arena: Arena Gardens
- City: Toronto, Ontario
- Team colours: Blue
- Owner(s): Percy Quinn 1911–1913; Frank Robinson 1911–1915; Eddie Livingstone 1915–1918
- Stanley Cups: 1 (1913–14)

The Toronto Hockey Club, known as the Torontos and the Toronto Blueshirts, were a professional ice hockey team based in Toronto. They were a member of the National Hockey Association (NHA). The club was founded in 1911 and began operations in 1912. The club won its sole Stanley Cup championship in 1914.

The club became the centre of a controversy among NHA owners leading to the NHA suspending operations and the owners forming the National Hockey League (NHL). The Blueshirts were replaced in the NHL by a new Toronto Hockey Club under the ownership of the Toronto Arena Company, the Blueshirts' former landlord. The Torontos' players were leased to the Arena ownership temporarily and competed in the NHL in 1917–18, winning the Stanley Cup. The Arena Company was then granted a permanent franchise for the 1918–19 season that evolved into today's Toronto Maple Leafs.

== History ==
=== Founding to Cup winners ===
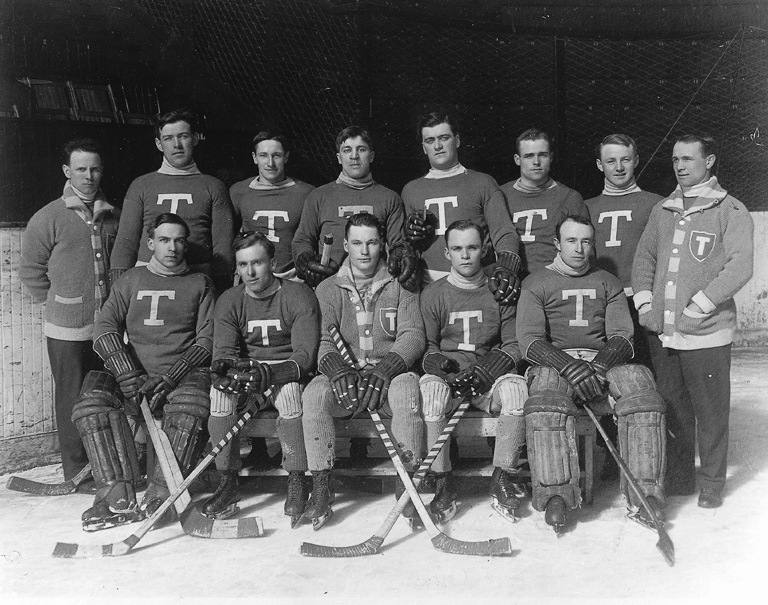
The Torontos, Stanley Cup champions 1913-14

The NHA was founded in 1909 without any teams based in Toronto. National Hockey Association (NHA) founder Ambrose O'Brien operated four franchises in the NHA: the Cobalt Silver Kings, Haileybury Comets, Les Canadiens and the Renfrew Creamery Kings. In 1910, O'Brien suspended the Cobalt, Haileybury and Canadiens clubs and sold one franchise to form the Montreal Canadiens, who took the Les Canadiens' players. In 1911, O'Brien decided to leave professional ice hockey entirely. Quebec interests bought one of the franchises from O'Brien, and the final two were sold to interests who planned to relocate the teams to Toronto. Toronto had not previously had an arena with artificial ice that would be large enough for an NHA team, but in 1911 work had begun on constructing the Arena Gardens. The arena was owned by the Toronto Arena Company, organized on September 19, 1911, with Sir Henry Pellatt as president, Lol Solman as managing director, and directors Aemilius Jarvis, Joseph Kilgour, T.W. Horn, R.A. Smith, and Col. Carlson. There were two other directors from Montreal. W. J. Bellingham was the initial manager.

The franchise which became the Toronto Hockey Club was bought by Frank Robinson, Percy Quinn and other investors for CA$2,000. Quinn was president of the Dominion Lacrosse Association, a Canadian professional lacrosse league that had patterned itself after the NHA. The second Toronto franchise was awarded to a group affiliated with the Tecumseh Lacrosse Club of Toronto. The Tecumsehs bought a franchise from O'Brien, paying CA$500 cash and promissory notes for CA$2,000. Although the NHA franchise was bought from O'Brien, who had operated a team with it, no other assets came with the franchise. According to Coleman, the franchise for the Torontos was that used by the Les Canadiens. Other books quote O'Brien as selling the Canadiens to George Kennedy, leaving the case of which franchise was sold to Robinson unresolved. In any case, the Toronto team was built from scratch and did not include any players from Les Canadiens. The first manager was Toronto native and former Ottawa Senators player Bruce Ridpath, who had intended to be a playing-coach but was no longer able to play due to an injury suffered when he was struck by an automobile the previous year.

The schedule for the 1911–12 season was drawn up with two Toronto teams. As the Arena was not finished, no games were scheduled to be played in Toronto until the end of January, when the new arena was supposed to be ready. It soon became clear that construction of Arena Gardens would not be finished in time, and in mid-December it was announced that the two Toronto teams had been dropped from the schedule and the league would play with only four teams that season.

The Torontos played their first game on December 25, 1912, before 4,000 fans at Arena Gardens. The Toronto Hockey Club was owned by Quinn, managed by Ridpath, and initially coached by Tom Humphrey who was soon replaced by player-coach Jack Marshall. The team Ridpath put on the ice included Cully Wilson and future hall-of-famers Hap Holmes, Harry Cameron, Frank Foyston, and Frank Nighbor. The Torontos finished the year in a tie for third place.

Before the 1913–14 season, the club faced some upheaval. Ridpath resigned as manager in October 1913 and was replaced by Marshall. Ridpath would try out as a player but gave up his comeback attempt before the season started. Despite the changes, the Torontos won the Stanley Cup in 1914, defeating the Montreal Canadiens in a playoff to decide the NHA champion.

After the season, the team then played a series with the Victoria Aristocrats of the Pacific Coast Hockey League. A controversy erupted when a letter arrived from the Stanley Cup trustees on March 17, that the trustees would not let the Stanley Cup travel west, as they did not consider Victoria a proper challenger because they had not formally notified the trustees. However, on March 18, Trustee William Foran stated that it was a misunderstanding. PCHA president Frank Patrick had not filed a challenge, because he had expected Emmett Quinn of the NHA to make all of the arrangements in his role as hockey commissioner, whereas the trustees thought they were being deliberately ignored. In any case, all arrangements had been ironed out and the Victoria challenge was accepted. Nevertheless, the Torontos defeated Victoria in a best-of-five series played in Toronto in three straight games.

=== The Livingstone era ===
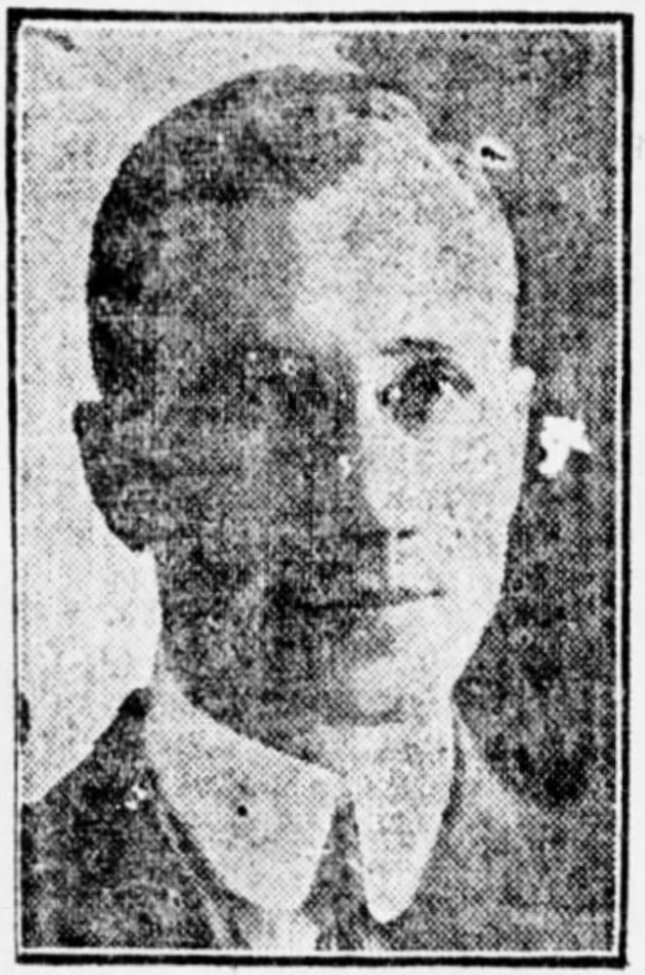
Eddie Livingstone.

Quinn left the team after the Stanley Cup win to return to business and his absence was felt. The next season, the team fell to fourth place in the six-team NHA with a record of 8 wins and 12 losses (down from 13 wins and 7 losses).

Before the 1915–16 season, several events occurred that changed the NHA and the Blueshirts specifically. Robinson joined the Canadian military in 1915 and put the Blueshirts up for sale. Robinson received two offers for the club; the McNamara brothers and Eddie Livingstone, owner of the Toronto Shamrocks. Livingstone was from Toronto and offered more, and Robinson accepted his bid. At the same time, the Pacific Coast Hockey Association—upset over the NHA's efforts to bring Cyclone Taylor back east—broke all ties with the NHA and conducted a player raid. The PCHA created a new team in Seattle and stocked it with the Torontos' two leading scorers in Wilson and Foyston, their goaltender, Hap Holmes, and two other key members of the Toronto team in Jack Walker and Eddie Carpenter. The only regular Blueshirts' players to remain in Toronto were Cameron and Roy McGiffin. Livingstone announced he planned to sell the Shamrocks. After the dust settled, the Patricks had stocked their new team, conducted a raid on the NHA, Robinson was able to sell his team and Livingstone had the Toronto market to himself. Despite the raid, Livingstone did not retaliate against the PCHA and never did. According to authors Morey Holzman and Joseph Nieforth, this strongly suggested a deal had been made between Livingstone, Robinson and the Patricks. To make up for the players lost in the raid, Livingstone transferred Shamrocks players to the Blueshirts and allowed the Shamrock franchise to go dormant. The Torontos, composed mostly of former Shamrock players, skated to a record of 9 wins, 14 losses and 1 tie in the 1915–16 NHA season, finishing in last place in the five-team league.

The Globe was not against the removal of Livingstone, in this editorial of February 13, 1917.

Livingstone was frequently at odds with his fellow owners, particularly Sam Lichtenhein of the Montreal Wanderers. Tempers boiled over when the NHA added a second Toronto team in 1916–17, representing the 228th Battalion of the Canadian army. The 228th was forced to withdraw its team in mid-season when the unit was called overseas. That left the NHA with an odd number of teams. On February 12, the team owners—at a meeting that did not include Livingstone—decided to even-up the number of teams by suspending operations of the Torontos for the rest of the season. All players were given to other NHA teams for the rest of the season. At the time, the plan was to return the players to the Toronto franchise, but the other owners wanted Livingstone out. At the end of the season, Toronto was reinstated, with the condition that Livingstone sell the club within 60 days. However, Livingstone obtained a court order to prevent the sale.

=== 1917–1919: Arena era ===
On November 22, the NHA owners announced that the league would suspend operations for the 1917–18 season. About two weeks later, all of the owners except Livingstone announced that they were creating a new league, the National Hockey League. However, they did not invite Livingstone to join them, effectively leaving him in a one-team league. The NHA owners made this move as a work-around the NHA constitution, which barred them from expelling the Blueshirts even though they had long since lost patience with him.

Despite having rid themselves of Livingstone, the other teams wished to keep a team in Toronto. They also needed a fourth team to balance the schedule due to the Quebec Bulldogs' decision to sit out the season. Accordingly, Livingstone's landlord, the Toronto Arena Company, was given a temporary Toronto franchise in the NHL and leased Livingstone's Torontos players for the inaugural 1917–18 NHL season. At the time, Frank Calder, the NHL president, was demanding that the Arena Company and Livingstone come to an agreement to transfer the franchise.

To Toronto fans, it looked like little had changed on the ice. Although the team had no official name, it was made up mostly of former Blueshirts. As a result, the newspapers still called the team "the Blueshirts" or "the Torontos," as they always had. Additionally, the team wore a white sweater with a blue "T," the same uniform worn by the Blueshirts in the previous season. Led by general manager Charlie Querrie and coach Dick Carroll, the team won the Stanley Cup in 1918. In fitting fashion, no winner was engraved on the Stanley Cup. However, in 1947, the NHL added the name of the Toronto Arenas for 1918.

The Arena Company had originally promised to return the Toronto players to Livingstone if no transfer could be arranged. Instead, before the 1918–19 season, it formed a new club, the Toronto Arena Hockey Club. This new franchise was separated from the Arena Company because it was due money to Livingstone from the players and the Stanley Cup revenues (fixed later by court at $20,000). Additionally, it could exist separately from any legal action filed by Livingstone. On paper, the club was owned by Arena Company secretary-treasurer Hubert Vearncombe and Querrie, with Vearncombe as team president. The NHL readily admitted this new team as a member in good standing. Querrie remained as general manager. However, the team had a dismal five-win season and was forced to suspend operations in February, and blamed Livingstone for interference.

By 1919, the NHA owners had established that there would be no revival of the NHA. However, the dispute with Livingstone forced the Arena Company into bankruptcy. The Arenas were sold to a group headed by Querrie, who renamed them the Toronto St. Patricks. This team became the Toronto Maple Leafs midway through the 1926–27 season. The NHA/NHL claimed the $5000 franchise fee from the 1919 St. Patricks was to 'buy' Livingstone's hockey club. By all accounts, however, the money instead went into Calder's pocket.

Despite the ties to the Torontos, the Maple Leafs do not claim the Blueshirts' history as their own (unlike the Canadiens, the other NHL franchise with NHA roots). They do, however, claim the history of the "temporary" Toronto NHL franchise of 1917–18.

==== Players on the 1916–17 and 1917–18 teams ====
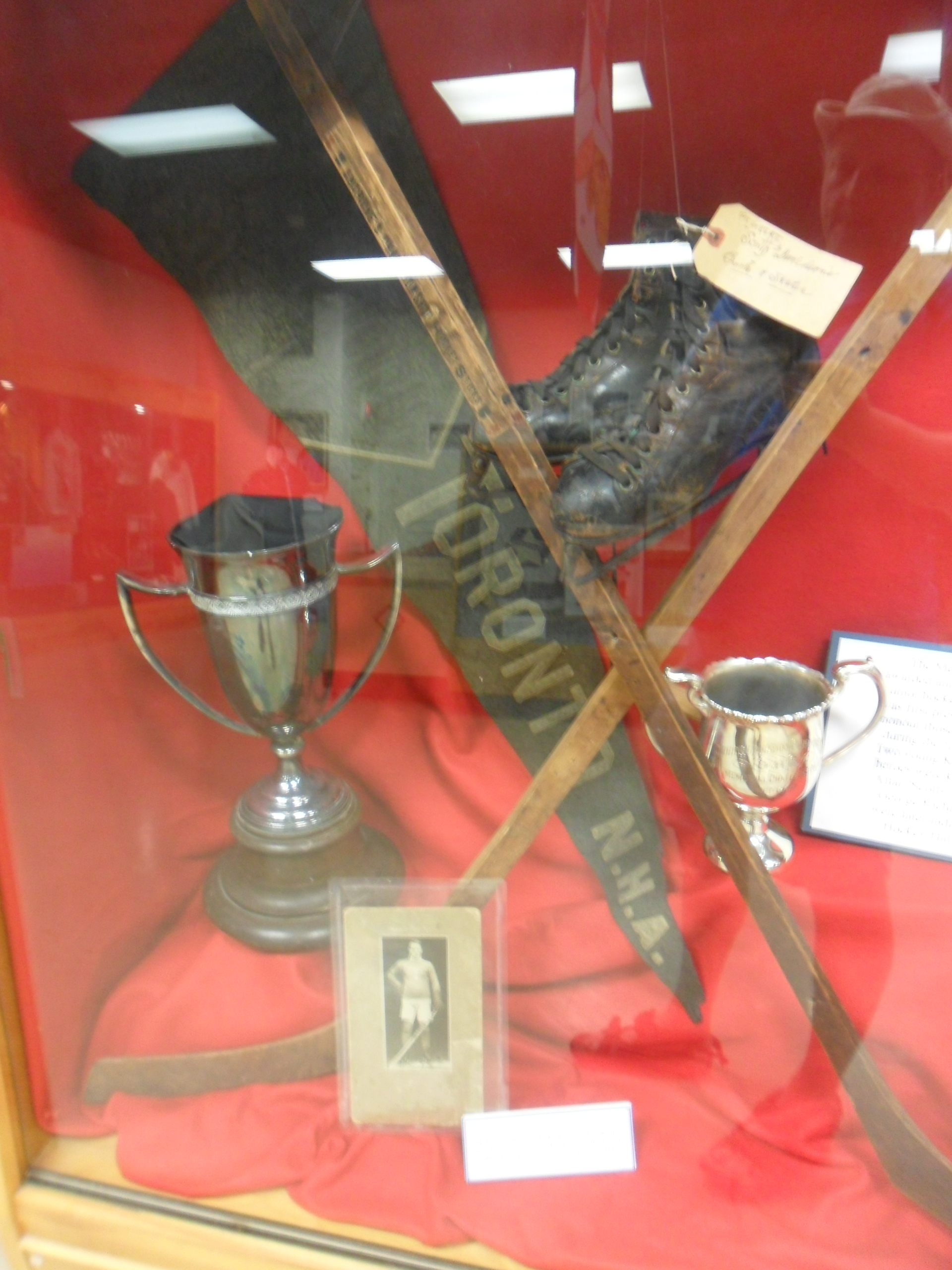
Blueshirts' championship banner on display at International Hockey Hall of Fame along with items Harry Cameron used

These players were the property of the Toronto Hockey Club in 1916–17 and returned to play for the Torontos of 1917–18.

- Arthur Brooks
- Harry Cameron – had played 228 games (NHA and NHL combined)
- Jack Coughlin
- Corb Denneny
- Reg Noble
- Ken Randall
- Alf Skinner

== Notable players ==
The following former Torontos have been inducted into the Hockey Hall of Fame:

- Harry Cameron
- Cy Denneny
- Scotty Davidson
- Frank Foyston
- Hap Holmes
- Duke Keats
- Jack Marshall
- Frank Nighbor
- Reg Noble
- Jack Walker

== Head coaches ==
- Bruce Ridpath (1912–13)
- Jack Marshall (1913–15)
- Eddie Livingstone (1915–17)
- Tom Humphrey

== See also ==
- List of Stanley Cup champions
- Toronto Arenas (1918–19)
- Toronto St. Patricks (1919–27)
- Toronto Maple Leafs (1927–present)
