= Pierre Vézina (ice hockey) =

Canadian ice hockey player

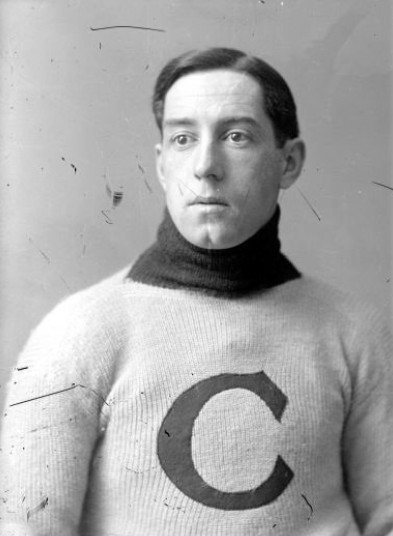
- Born: June 29, 1885 Chicoutimi, Quebec, Canada
- Died: July 24, 1944 (aged 59)
- Position: Defence
- Played for: Montreal Canadiens
- Playing career: 1911–1923

Joseph Charles Pierre Vézina (June 29, 1885 – July 24, 1944) was a Canadian professional ice hockey player. He played with the Montreal Canadiens of the National Hockey Association in the 1911–12 season, appearing in one game and going scoreless. He was the brother of Georges Vézina.
