= History of the Montreal Canadiens =

History of the ice hockey club

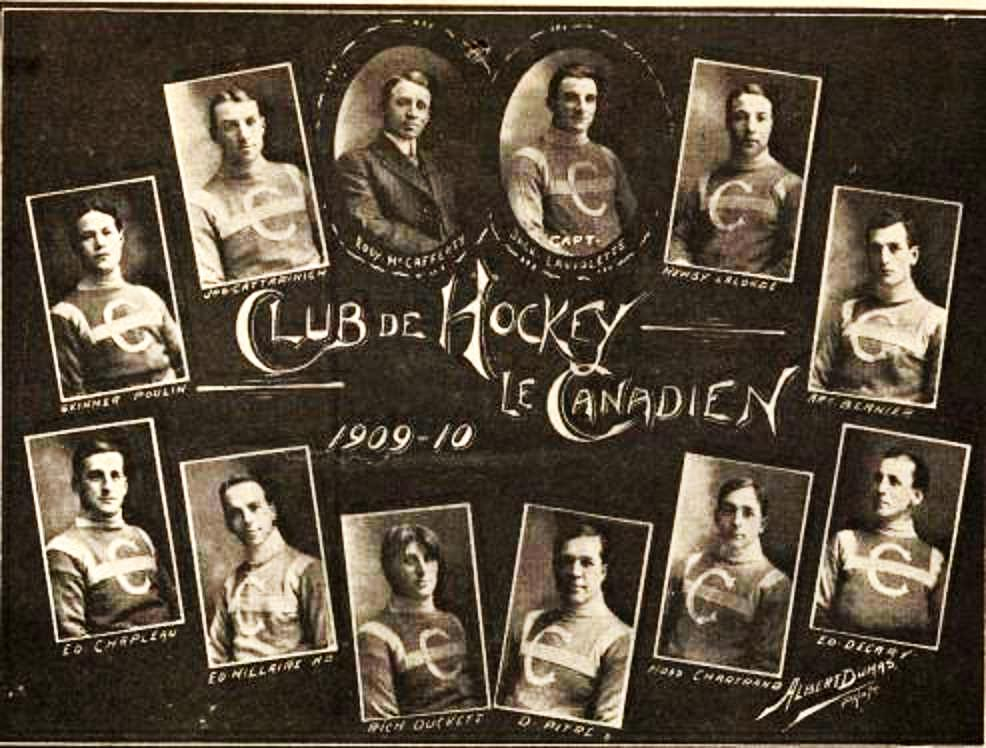
The 1909–10 Canadiens

The Montreal Canadiens, formally Le Club de Hockey Canadien, was founded on December 4, 1909. The Canadiens are the oldest professional ice hockey franchise in the world. Created as a founding member of the National Hockey Association (NHA) with the aim of appealing to Montreal's francophone population, the Canadiens played their first game on January 5, 1910, and captured their first Stanley Cup in 1916. The team left the NHA and helped found the National Hockey League (NHL) in 1917. They returned to the Stanley Cup Final in 1919, but their series against the Seattle Metropolitans was cancelled without a winner due to the Spanish flu pandemic that killed defenceman Joe Hall. The Canadiens have won the Stanley Cup 24 times: once while part of the National Hockey Association (NHA), and 23 times as members of the NHL. With 24 NHL titles overall, they are the most successful team in league history.

The Canadiens' home rink, the Montreal Arena, was destroyed by fire in January 1918. The team moved into the Jubilee Arena, which subsequently burned down in 1919. After spending seven seasons in the Mount Royal Arena, the Canadiens moved into the Montreal Forum in 1926, sharing it with the rival Montreal Maroons until 1938. After 72 years in the Forum, they moved to the Bell Centre in 1996. The club struggled during the Great Depression, nearly relocating to Cleveland, Ohio, in 1935 and contemplated suspending operations in 1939. Their fortunes rebounded following World War II as they reached the Stanley Cup Final each year from 1951 to 1960, winning six championships, including a record five consecutive titles from 1956 to 1960.

Maurice "Rocket" Richard emerged as the team's star in the 1940s, and during the 1944–45 season became the first player in NHL history to score 50 goals in a single season. Richard sparked the Richard Riot in March 1955 when he was suspended for attacking a linesman. The incident highlighted growing tensions between French Quebec and English Canada, and is regarded as one of the first manifestations of Quebec's Quiet Revolution. In 1959, Jacques Plante revolutionized the game when he became the first goaltender to consistently wear a mask during play. Under general manager Sam Pollock, the Canadiens won nine championships between 1964 and 1978. The 1976–77 team, often regarded as the greatest in NHL history, won 60 games while losing only 8, a record for fewest losses in an 80-game season. With the entry of the World Hockey Association's Quebec Nordiques to the NHL in 1979, a rivalry grew between the Canadiens and the Nordiques, peaking in 1984 when the Canadiens eliminated the Nordiques in six games, but not before the Good Friday Massacre made headlines.

Led by goaltender Patrick Roy, the Canadiens won their 23rd Stanley Cup in 1986 and their 24th in 1993. Roy won the Conn Smythe Trophy as the playoffs' most valuable player both times. The 1993 team set an NHL record with 10 consecutive overtime victories in one playoff year and is the most recent Canadian team to win the Stanley Cup. In 2003, Montreal participated in the first regular season outdoor game in NHL history, defeating the Edmonton Oilers in the Heritage Classic.

The Hockey Hall of Fame has inducted over 50 former Canadiens players, as well as ten executives. The team has retired 15 numbers, representing 18 players, and has honoured ten off-ice personnel in its Builder's Row.

== Founding ==
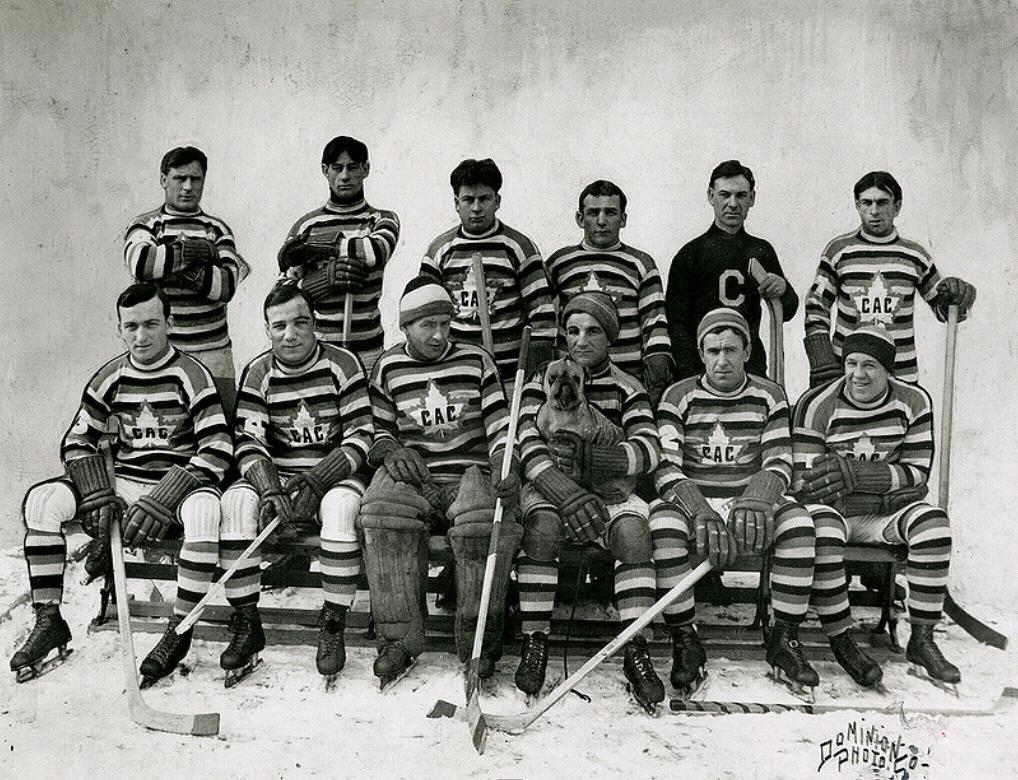
The Montreal Canadiens pose for a team photo, 1912–13

In November 1909, industrialist Ambrose O'Brien of Renfrew, Ontario, was in Montreal to purchase supplies for a railway contract. At the request of the Renfrew Creamery Kings hockey team, he attended the Eastern Canada Hockey Association (ECHA) meetings, held at the Windsor Hotel, to represent Renfrew in its application to join the league. At the meeting, the ECHA team owners rejected Renfrew's application. Later that day the ECHA's owners chose to disband their league and form the Canadian Hockey Association (CHA) in a bid to exclude the Montreal Wanderers, who had upset the other owners when they moved into a smaller arena that would reduce the visiting team's share of gate receipts. In the lobby of the hotel, O'Brien met Jimmy Gardner, manager of the Wanderers, and discussed forming a new league which would include Renfrew, the Wanderers, and two teams that O'Brien owned in the Ontario mining towns of Cobalt and Haileybury. Gardner suggested that O'Brien start a team of francophone players based in Montreal, forming a rivalry with the Wanderers. As a result, the National Hockey Association (NHA) was founded on December 2, 1909, and Les Canadiens were created two days later, initially financed by O'Brien with the intent of transferring ownership to francophone sportsmen in Montreal as soon as possible.

At the time, francophone teams were not considered to be good enough to play with the top anglophone teams: the Montreal Gazette warned potential fans of the new team not to get too excited, as "French-Canadian players of class are not numerous". The Canadiens stocked their team with francophone stars including Newsy Lalonde, Georges Poulin and Didier Pitre. Before being allowed to play, Pitre had to resolve a lawsuit with the Montreal Nationals, to which he was already under contract.

== 1910–1917: National Hockey Association ==
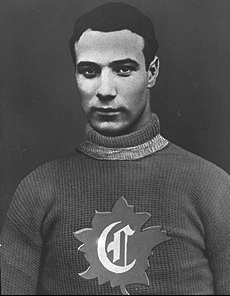
Newsy Lalonde helped lead the Canadiens to their first Stanley Cup in 1916.

The Canadiens played their first game on January 5, 1910, coached by Jack Laviolette. Before a sellout crowd of 3,000, they defeated Cobalt 7–6 in overtime. The victory was erased from the history books shortly after, as the CHA collapsed after only two weeks of play, and the NHA chose to restart the season after absorbing the CHA's Ottawa Senators and the Montreal Shamrocks. The Canadiens' first game of the new season was played January 19, a 9–4 loss to the Renfrew Creamery Kings. They lost three more games before finally recording their first victory of the new season on February 7, when they defeated the Haileybury Hockey Club by a score of 9–7. They won only two of their 12 games that season, and finished last in the eight-team league.

George Kennedy, owner of the Club Athlétique Canadien (CAC), claimed rights to the "Canadiens" team name following the season. He settled the dispute by buying the team from O'Brien for $7,500. That same year, the team adopted its now-famous red sweater with a blue stripe across the front. In the middle of the stripe was an elongated red C encompassing a red A to represent the CAC.

The Canadiens reached the playoffs for the first time in 1913–14 when they tied the Toronto Blueshirts for the league lead with 26 points. The two teams played a two-game series for the championship, with the winner based on total goals. Georges Vezina shut out the Blueshirts 2–0 in the first game, but the Canadiens were defeated 6–0 in the second and lost the series. Two years later, in 1915–16, the Canadiens won the NHA championship, the O'Brien Cup, with a 16–7–1 record, three wins better than the second place Senators. The title earned the Canadiens their first berth in the Stanley Cup Final, where they faced the Portland Rosebuds of the Pacific Coast Hockey Association (PCHA). With the best-of-five series tied at two wins apiece, the deciding game was held at Westmount Arena in Montreal on March 30, 1916. Montreal's Goldie Prodgers scored the winning goal with less than four minutes to play, giving the Canadiens their first Stanley Cup championship.

In 1916, the CAC faced financial difficulty after a January fire destroyed its gymnasium and the Montreal Canadians lacrosse team failed. Kennedy separated the hockey club from the CAC and incorporated it in March 1916 as "Le club de Hockey Canadien". The Canadiens changed their logo to a red "C" interlocked with a white "H". The H in the logo stands for "hockey," though the long-standing misconception that it stands for "Habitants" led to the team being nicknamed "the Habs".

The NHA met its demise in the winter of 1917 following several long-running disputes between Blueshirts owner Eddie Livingstone and the league's other four teams over who owned the rights to various players. Kennedy especially disliked Livingstone, and the two nearly came to blows numerous times during league meetings. However, the Canadiens, Wanderers, Senators and Quebec Bulldogs discovered that while they were united in their distaste for Livingstone, the league constitution didn't allow them to simply vote him out. To solve this problem, on November 26 they created a new league, the National Hockey League (NHL), and didn't invite Livingstone to join them. They nominally remained members of the NHA and had enough votes to suspend the league's operations, effectively leaving Livingstone in a one-team league. Kennedy was the dominant force in the new league; he not only owned the Canadiens, but had loaned Tommy Gorman the money he used to buy the Senators. However, the four teams still desired to have a team from Toronto in their league. They also needed a fourth team to balance the schedule after financial difficulties forced the Bulldogs to suspend operations (as it turned out, they wouldn't take the ice until 1919). With this in mind, they granted a "temporary" franchise to the Toronto Arena Company, which eventually evolved into the Canadiens' rivals, the Toronto Maple Leafs.

== 1917–1932: Early National Hockey League ==
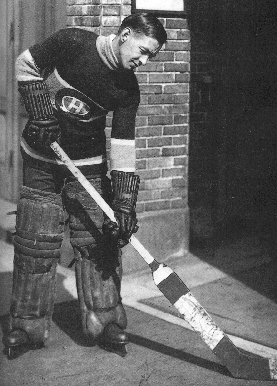
Georges Vezina played 16 seasons for the Montreal Canadiens between 1910 and 1925. The Vezina Trophy is named after him.

Joe Malone recorded five goals for the Canadiens in their NHL debut, a 7–4 victory over the Senators, en route to a league leading 44 goal season. The fledgling league nearly collapsed on January 2, 1918, after a fire destroyed the Montreal Arena, home to both the Wanderers and the Canadiens. The Canadiens relocated to the 3,000-seat Jubilee Arena, but the Wanderers ceased operations, reducing the NHL to three teams. Playing a revamped split season schedule, Montreal won the first half title, but lost the league championship to second half winning Toronto by a score of 10–7 in a two-game, total goals series.

The Canadiens won the NHL championship against the Senators in 1918–19, and traveled west to meet the PCHA champion Seattle Metropolitans for the Stanley Cup. The series is best remembered for its cancellation due to the Spanish flu pandemic. Several players from both teams became ill, prompting health officials in Seattle to cancel the sixth, and deciding, game. With his entire team either in the hospital or confined to bed, Kennedy attempted to borrow players from the PCHA's Victoria Aristocrats, only to be turned down by PCHA president Frank Patrick. With no way to field a team, Kennedy announced he was forfeiting the game—and the Cup—to the Metropolitans. However, the Metropolitans turned it down; coach Pete Muldoon felt that with the Canadiens decimated by the flu, it wouldn't be sportsmanlike to claim the title. Star defenceman Joe Hall never recovered, and died on April 5, 1919.

During the following summer, the Jubilee Rink burned down, forcing the Canadiens to build Mount Royal Arena as a replacement. The team also lost their star player Malone, who had been on loan from the dormant Bulldogs as Quebec rejoined the league in 1919–20. Kennedy died in 1921; he had never recovered from the 1919 flu. His widow sold the team to Leo Dandurand, former player Joseph Cattarinich and Louis A. Letourneau.

Regarded as one of the NHL's first superstars, Howie Morenz made his debut in 1923–24 alongside Aurel Joliat. The club placed second in the league to Ottawa, but defeated the Senators in the playoffs to win the league championship and reach the Stanley Cup Final. Montreal hosted the 1924 Stanley Cup Final against the Calgary Tigers of the Western Canada Hockey League (WCHL). The Canadiens won the best-of-three series in two games, and captured their second Stanley Cup. Morenz was the offensive star of the series, scoring a hat trick in game one and a goal in game two.

The Montreal Forum, which in later decades became synonymous with the Canadiens, was opened in 1924 to house the expansion Montreal Maroons, one of two new teams in the NHL that season. The Canadiens were invited to inaugurate the arena as the natural ice surface at the Mount Royal Arena was not ready to host NHL games. The team played the first game in Forum history on November 29, 1924, a 7–1 victory over the Toronto St. Patricks. The Canadiens took residence at the Forum in 1926, sharing it with the Maroons until the latter ceased operations in 1938. Only nine days after their first NHL regular season game at the Forum, on December 8, 1924, what would become the new NHL's longest running rivalry was initiated as the Canadiens played "the other" expansion team for the 1924–25 season for the very first time: the United States-based Boston Bruins, whom the visiting Canadiens, playing for their first-ever NHL regular season game in the United States, defeated in a 4–3 comeback victory at the Boston Arena.

For the 1924–25 season, the Canadiens celebrated their world champion status with a special jersey design. The team moved their CH logo to their sleeves and played with a large world globe logo crest on their jersey fronts. Montreal finished third in the league standings and defeated Toronto in the semi-final. The players on the first-place Hamilton Tigers refused to participate in a playoff series unless they were paid an additional $200 each. When they failed to relent on their demands, NHL president Frank Calder suspended the entire team, and declared the Canadiens to be the league champions. The Habs thus traveled to the Pacific Coast to play the WCHL's Victoria Cougars in the 1925 Stanley Cup Final. The Cougars won the best-of-five series, 3–1; it was the last time a non-NHL team won the Stanley Cup.

Georges Vezina collapsed during the first game of the 1925–26 season. He was diagnosed with tuberculosis and never played again, succumbing to the illness in March 1926. In his honour, the team donated a new award to the league, the Vezina Trophy, to be given to the goaltender who allowed the fewest goals over the course of the season. The first recipient was his replacement, George Hainsworth. Vezina was inducted into the Hockey Hall of Fame upon its creation in 1945.

During the 1927–28 season, Morenz became the first player in NHL history to score 50 points in a single season. Morenz was the first NHL player to score a second Stanley Cup winning goal, with the Canadiens' victory in the 1930 Stanley Cup Final over the Boston Bruins. The Bruins, who finished with a 38–5–1 record and at one point during the season went 23 games without a defeat, lost consecutive games to Montreal in the finals, 3–0 and 4–3. The Canadiens became the fourth team in Stanley Cup history to repeat as champions, defeating the Chicago Black Hawks in five games to capture the 1931 Stanley Cup championship.

== 1932–1946: Howie Morenz and Rocket Richard ==
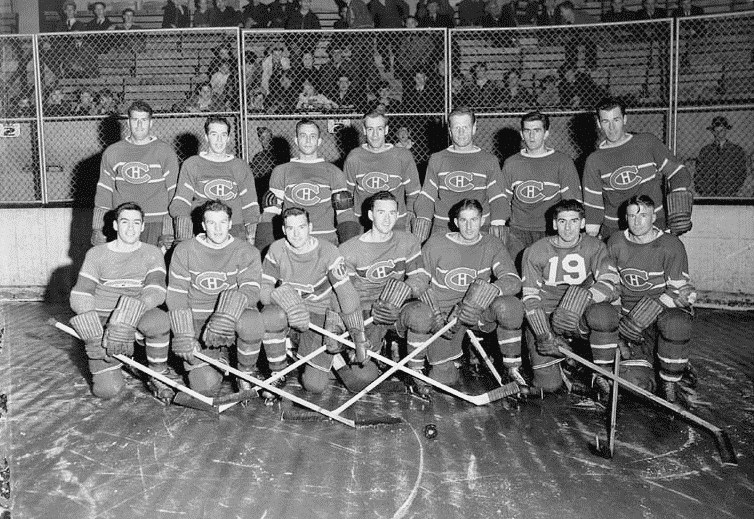
The 1942 Canadiens

Attendance was in decline across the league as the Great Depression took hold. The Habs posted a losing record in 1932–33, leading to still smaller crowds. Averaging only 2,000 fans per game, the team sold Morenz to the Chicago Black Hawks in 1934 as part of an effort to cut costs. The move was not a popular one, and fans voiced their opinion of the deal by giving Morenz a standing ovation when he scored against the Canadiens on the last day of the 1934–35 season.

With losses of $60,000 over the previous two seasons, the Canadiens were put up for sale in 1935. Dandurand and Cattarinich entered negotiations to sell the club and move it to Cleveland, Ohio, but a syndicate of local Montreal businessmen led by Maurice Forget and Ernest Savard stepped forward to buy the team and prevent the transfer. The Canadiens struggled on the ice, finishing with the worst record in the league in 1935–36. The new owners asked Cecil Hart to coach the team, in the hopes that he would bring the Habs back to respectability. Hart agreed with one stipulation: that the Canadiens bring back Morenz. The team agreed, and acquired an overjoyed Morenz in a trade with the New York Rangers.

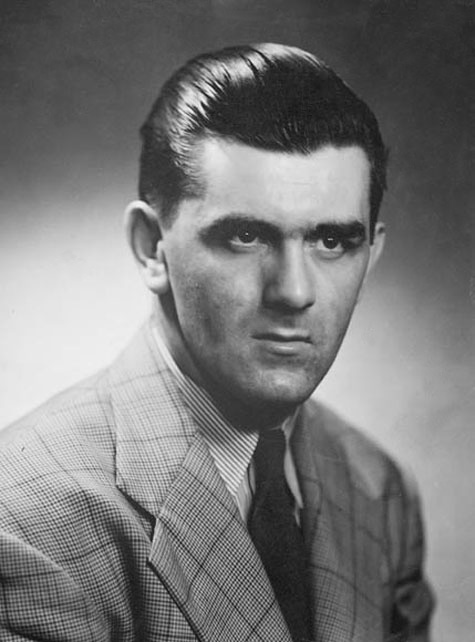
Maurice "Rocket" Richard starred for the Canadiens from 1942 to 1960 and was the first player to score 50 goals in 50 games.

Morenz's return to Montreal lasted less than a season: in January 1937, while being checked by Chicago's Earl Seibert, his skate caught on the ice and Morenz broke his leg in four places. He never recovered, and died of a coronary embolism on March 8. Aurel Joliat offered a different explanation of his death: "Howie loved to play hockey more than anyone ever loved anything, and when he realized that he would never play again, he couldn't live with it. I think Howie died of a broken heart." On the day of his funeral, 50,000 people filed past Morenz's casket at centre ice of the Montreal Forum to pay their last respects to the man the media called "the Babe Ruth of hockey". A benefit game in November 1937 raised $20,000 for Morenz's family as the NHL All-Stars defeated the Montreal Canadiens 6–5. Morenz was one of the first players elected to the Hockey Hall of Fame when it was created in 1945.

The Canadiens continued to finish near the bottom of the league standings for several seasons. The low point came in 1939–40: Babe Siebert, who was named the Habs' coach following his retirement as a player in 1939, drowned before the season began, and Pit Lepine was named as his replacement. With an aging roster, the Canadiens finished last, winning only 10 games. That team's .260 winning percentage is still the worst in franchise history. Largely due to the team's poor play, the Canadiens only drew 3,000 fans per game, leading Savard and his partners to consider suspending operations at least for the duration of World War II. Instead, they sold the franchise to the team's landlord, the Canadian Arena Company.

At this point, relief arrived from an unexpected quarter—Maple Leafs owner Conn Smythe. The Depression had already forced three teams to either shut down outright or suspend operations never to return. Additionally, the New York Americans had been wards of the league since 1936, and it was considered to be only a matter of time before they folded (they eventually did, in 1942). Smythe did not want to see the Canadiens fold, and suggested that the Arena Company hire the Maple Leafs' former coach, Dick Irvin. Irvin was a proven winner, having led the Maple Leafs to seven finals and one Cup in nine years. The Arena Company readily accepted Smythe's suggestion, and turned to Irvin to lead the once-proud team's revitalization.

By 1943, the war effort had a devastating effect on many rosters. The Red Wings lost nine players and the Maple Leafs lost six to the military. The Rangers lost ten players and had to be persuaded by the other teams not to suspend operations. In contrast, the Canadiens lost only one key player in Ken Reardon. Young phenom Maurice Richard tried to enlist, but was turned down due to his medical history. Canadiens General Manager Tommy Gorman reportedly ensured his players obtained jobs in key wartime industries to avoid conscription.

Led by the "Punch Line" of Richard, Toe Blake and Elmer Lach, the Habs won their fifth Stanley Cup in 1944, losing only five games in the regular season. In 1944–45, the team won 38 games and lost only eight, and Richard was the focus of the media and fans as he attempted to be the first player in league history to score 50 goals in a 50-game season. Richard set a single-game scoring record, recording five goals and three assists in a 9–1 victory over Detroit on December 28, 1944. He later broke Joe Malone's goal scoring record when he scored his 45th goal, after which opposing teams did all they could to prevent him from reaching the 50-goal mark. He was slashed, elbowed and held as no team wanted to be known as the one that gave up the milestone goal. Richard finally scored his 50th goal in Boston at 17:45 of the third period of Montreal's final game of the season. The record, previously considered nearly impossible to achieve, elevated Richard to the status of provincial hero in Quebec.

== 1946–1967: The Original Six ==
Prior to the expansion of the NHL in 1967, the league was reduced to six franchises, which would become known after 1967 as the "Original Six". Frank J. Selke replaced Tommy Gorman as general manager of the Canadiens in 1946, and held the post until 1964. Selke spent several years attempting to sign teenage star Jean Beliveau to play for the Canadiens. Beliveau played brief stints with the Habs in 1950 and 1952, but his loyalty to the Quebec Aces of the Quebec Senior Hockey League led him to turn the Canadiens down repeatedly when they pressed him to move to Montreal full-time. The Canadiens finally bought the entire Quebec senior league in 1953 and turned it professional in order to bring Beliveau into the fold, and he signed a five-year contract for $100,000. He spent his entire 18-year, Hall of Fame NHL career with the Habs.

In March 1955, Richard was suspended for the remainder of the season, including the playoffs, after he received a match penalty for slashing Boston's Hal Laycoe and subsequently punching a linesman who intervened. The suspension touched off a wave of anger toward league president Clarence Campbell, who was warned not to attend a scheduled game in Montreal after receiving numerous death threats, mainly from French-Canadians accusing him of anti-French bias. Campbell dismissed the warnings, and attended the March 17 game as planned. His presence at the game was perceived by many fans as a provocation and he was booed and pelted with eggs and fruit. An hour into the game, a fan lobbed a tear-gas bomb in Campbell's direction, causing fire officials to clear the building. Fans leaving the Forum were met by a growing mob of angry demonstrators who overwhelmed the 250 police officers on the scene and rioted outside of the Forum. Seventy people were arrested, 37 people injured, 50 stores were looted and $100,000 in property damage was reported as a result of the melee, which became known as l'affaire Richard, or the Richard Riot. The incident highlighted the growing cultural gap between French Quebec and English Canada and the riot is often described as an early manifestation of Quebec's Quiet Revolution.

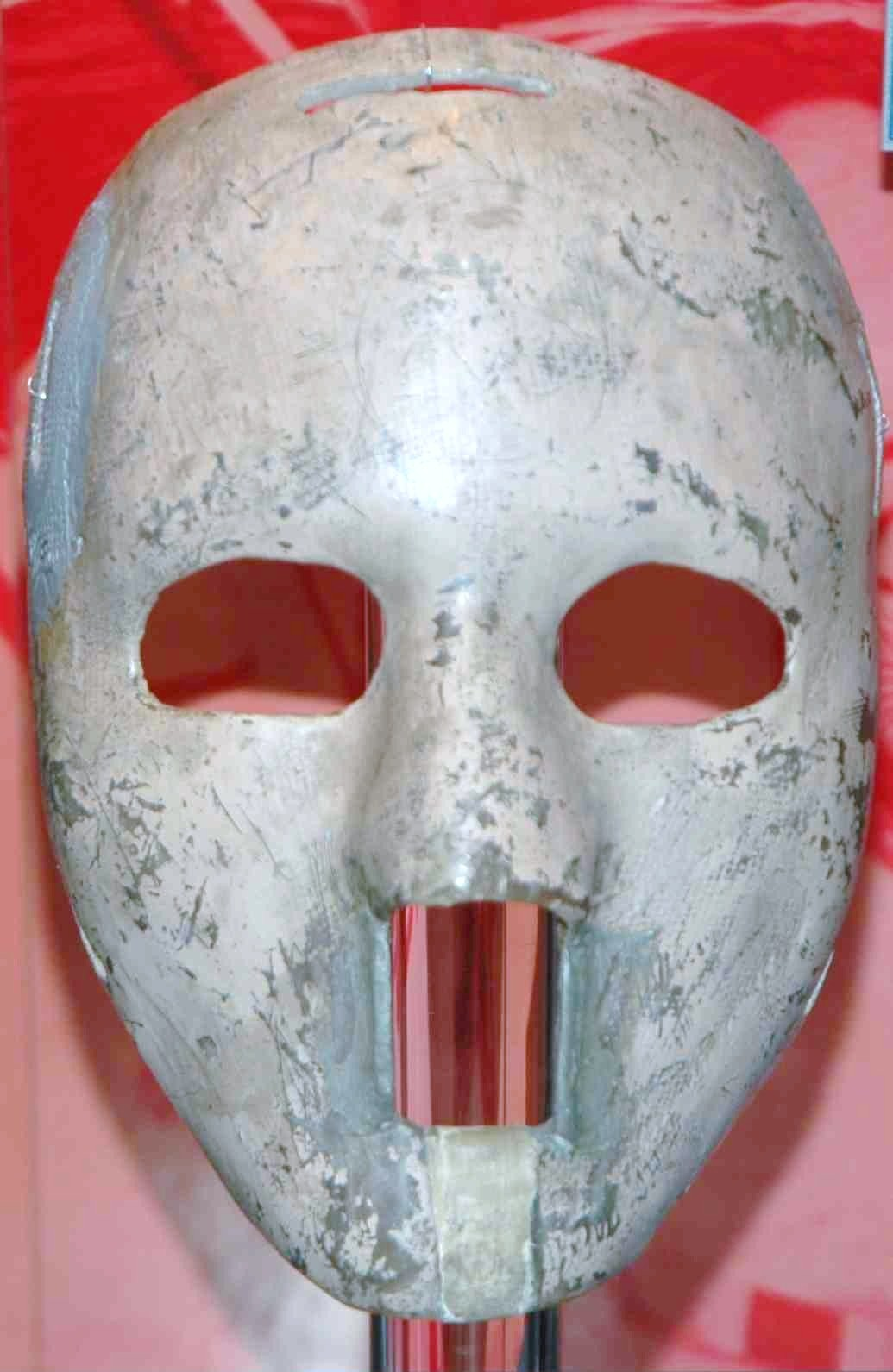
Jacques Plante's original mask. He was the first goaltender in NHL history to regularly wear one.

The following day, Richard went on a French-language Montreal radio station to ask the fans to stop rioting and instead to support the Canadiens in the playoffs. He also said he would accept his punishment and return the following year to win the Cup. While the Canadiens were defeated in the 1955 Stanley Cup Final, Richard led Montreal to the 1956 Stanley Cup as he promised.

The 1955–56 season was the first as head coach for Toe Blake, who was hired to help control Richard's temper. The 1956 victory began an unprecedented streak of five consecutive Stanley Cups for the Canadiens from 1956 to 1960; the 1960 Stanley Cup Final was Montreal's tenth consecutive appearance in the championship series. Richard, the first player to score 500 career goals in NHL history, retired in 1960 with 544 career goals and was elected to the Hockey Hall of Fame in 1961. The customary three-year waiting period was waived in honour of his accomplishments.

Goaltender Jacques Plante had been wearing a mask during practices for some time, but did not wear it during games due to the objections of Blake and Selke who held the traditional view that players should not wear facial protection. That changed on November 1, 1959, after he was struck in the face early in a game at Madison Square Garden. As teams did not dress backup goaltenders during this time, the game was delayed 20 minutes while doctors frantically stitched Plante up. When Blake asked him if he was ready to return to play, Plante refused to return to the ice unless he was allowed to wear a mask. Blake was livid, but agreed only if Plante removed the mask when his face was healed. Wearing the mask, Plante led the Canadiens on an 18-game unbeaten streak. He finally removed the mask at Blake's urging and promptly lost the next game. Defeated, Blake relented. Plante's mask became a permanent fixture as he led the Canadiens to their fifth consecutive Stanley Cup. Other goalies followed Plante's lead soon after.

When the NHL instituted the NHL amateur draft in 1963, the Canadiens were given the option to replace their regular first selection with two "Cultural Picks" that could be used to draft up to two French-Canadian players before any other team made any selections. The team used one cultural pick in 1968, and both in 1969, when it drafted Rejean Houle and Marc Tardif, two top prospects. This option was eliminated after the 1969 draft.

Selke retired in 1964 and was succeeded by Sam Pollock. Often named the best general manager in NHL history, Pollock led the Canadiens to nine Stanley Cup championships in his 14 years at the helm of the team. One of his key tactics was trading aging stars to expansion teams for draft picks, which led to the team drafting future Hall of Famers Guy Lafleur, Larry Robinson and Ken Dryden. The Canadiens won consecutive titles in 1965 and 1966, and entered the 1967 Stanley Cup Final against Toronto as a heavy favourite. The City of Montreal was so confident in the Canadiens that they had already built a space for the Stanley Cup on the Expo 67 site, but the Canadiens fell to the Maple Leafs, in the last NHL finals of the Original Six era.

== 1967–1979: Expansion era ==
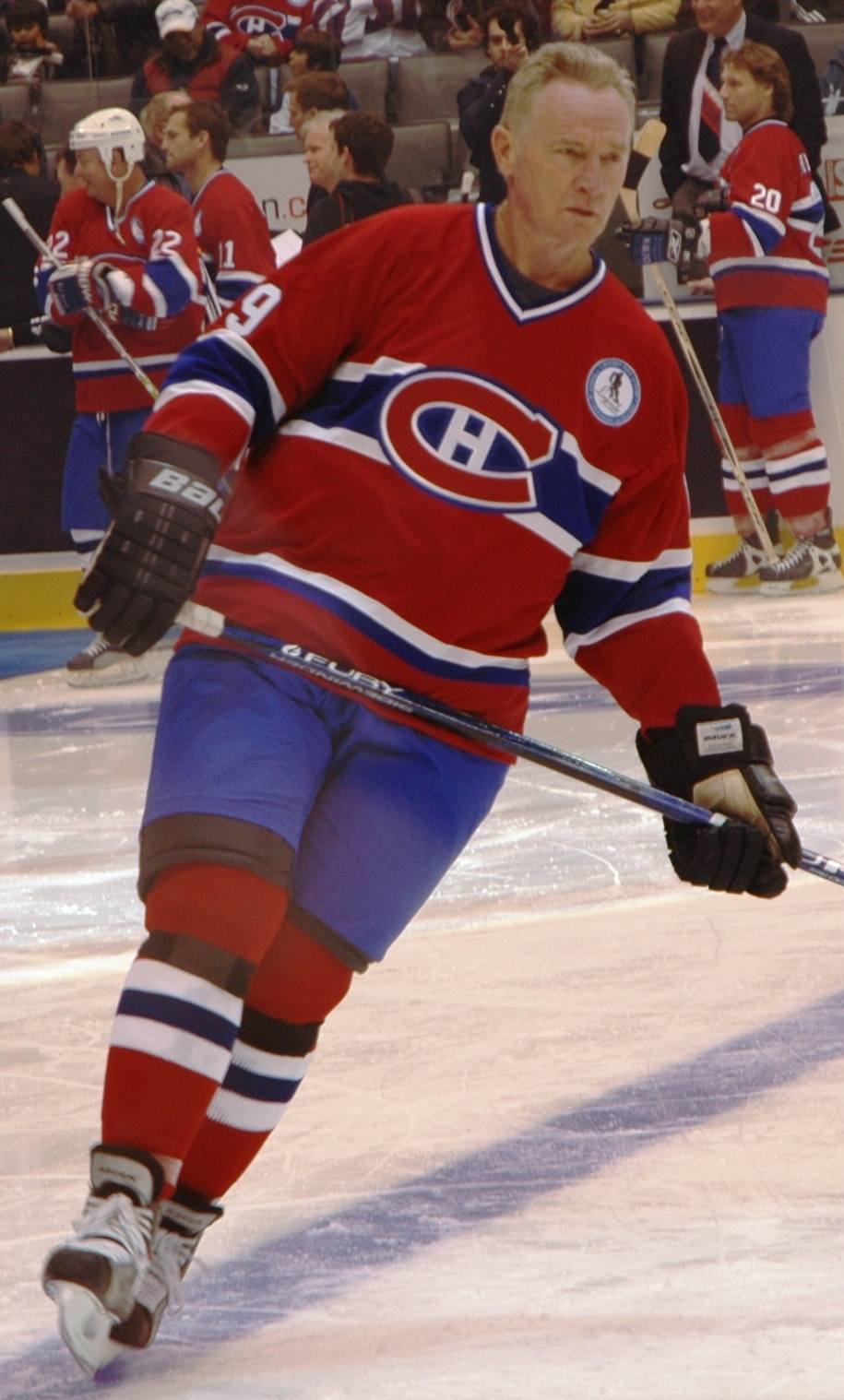
Larry Robinson, pictured in 2008, played 17 seasons in Montreal, winning six championships.

The NHL doubled in size to 12 teams in 1967–68 and organized itself into two divisions: the East Division, with the original six teams, and the West Division, which contained the six expansion franchises. The playoff format was constructed so that an established team would face an expansion team in the Stanley Cup Final. The Canadiens recovered from their loss in 1967 to sweep the St. Louis Blues four games to none in both 1968 and 1969 for their 15th and 16th championships.

The Canadiens missed the playoffs entirely in 1969–70, losing the last playoff spot in the East on a tiebreaker. On the last day of the season, New York defeated the Red Wings 9–5, tying Montreal in points and obtaining a five-goal lead on the Canadiens in total goals scored for the season. Montreal needed to win its game against the Black Hawks, or score at least five goals to qualify for the postseason. Trailing 5–2 with eight minutes to play, head coach Claude Ruel pulled his goaltender for an extra skater and watched Montreal surrender five empty net goals while scoring none to lose the game 10–2 and the final playoff spot to the Rangers. It was the only time between 1948 and 1995 that the Canadiens failed to make the playoffs.

The team rebounded in 1970–71, winning its 17th Stanley Cup. Rookie Ken Dryden had played only six games in his NHL career when he was named the starting goaltender for the playoffs. He led the team to series wins over Boston, Minnesota and Chicago, winning the Conn Smythe Trophy as the most valuable player of the playoffs. Team captain Jean Beliveau, the fourth player in league history to score 500 career goals, announced his retirement following the season. Despite his Cup triumph, Al MacNeil was removed as coach after just one season amidst conflicts with several players, including Henri Richard, who described MacNeil as being "incompetent" during the playoffs. MacNeil was replaced by Scotty Bowman, a Montreal native and former Blues coach. Bowman coached the Canadiens for eight seasons, winning five Stanley Cups, including four in a row from 1976 to 1979. The teams dominance was to the point that Montreal mayor Jean Drapeau would announce at budget planning meetings that the next Stanley Cup parade would follow its usual route before the season even began.

Following the success of the Summit Series in 1972, a series of exhibition games between NHL and Soviet league clubs known as the Super Series was launched. On New Year's Eve 1975, the Canadiens met the Soviet Red Army in a game that is considered to be one of the greatest ever played. A contest between the two greatest hockey teams in the world, the match ended in a 3–3 draw following Soviet goaltender Vladislav Tretiak's 35-save performance.

The 1976–77 Canadiens won 60 games in an 80-game schedule, losing only eight times, and just once at home. Guy Lafleur led the league in scoring, and won the Hart, Lester B. Pearson, Art Ross and Conn Smythe trophies; Dryden won the Vezina Trophy, Bowman the Jack Adams Award and Larry Robinson the James Norris Memorial Trophy. The Canadiens were so dominant that Dryden complained to The Hockey News that he was "a little bored" by the lack of competition. The 1976–77 Canadiens are widely considered to be the greatest team in NHL history, though arguments exist for the 1955–56 and 1975–76 Canadiens teams as well.

The 1978–79 season capped Montreal's run of four consecutive championships in dramatic fashion. Facing the Bruins in the seventh game of the league semi-finals, Montreal trailed 4–3 with less than two minutes to play when Boston head coach Don Cherry accidentally sent too many players onto the ice during a line change, drawing what would become one of the most famous penalties in NHL history, and eventually costing Cherry his job. During the subsequent power play, Lafleur scored the game-tying goal with 74 seconds remaining in regulation time, and Yvon Lambert scored in overtime to win the game and series. The Canadiens proceeded to defeat the Rangers for the Cup in five games.

The Canadiens' dominance in the late 1970s was due in part to the presence of the rival World Hockey Association (WHA) (which had begun play in 1972) — the Canadiens were far more successful compared to other NHL teams in resisting WHA efforts to lure away top talent. The Canadiens played a central role in the 1979 merger with the WHA, which added the Edmonton Oilers, Hartford Whalers, Quebec Nordiques and Winnipeg Jets to the NHL. After years of talks, a merger agreement was reached between the two leagues, but the NHL's governors rejected the deal by one vote. Most of the NHL's American teams were in favour of the merger in part because they thought it would help them challenge Montreal's dominance, whereas against the deal were the Canadiens, who, along with the Vancouver Canucks and Toronto Maple Leafs, opposed splitting Hockey Night in Canada television revenues six ways instead of three. Upon hearing the result of the vote, fans in Edmonton, Quebec and Winnipeg launched a massive boycott of products sold by Molson, owners of the Canadiens since 1978. The boycott, along with pressure from the House of Commons of Canada, led Montreal and Vancouver to reverse their positions when a re-vote was held on March 22, 1979, allowing the merger to pass.

== 1980–1996: Transitions ==
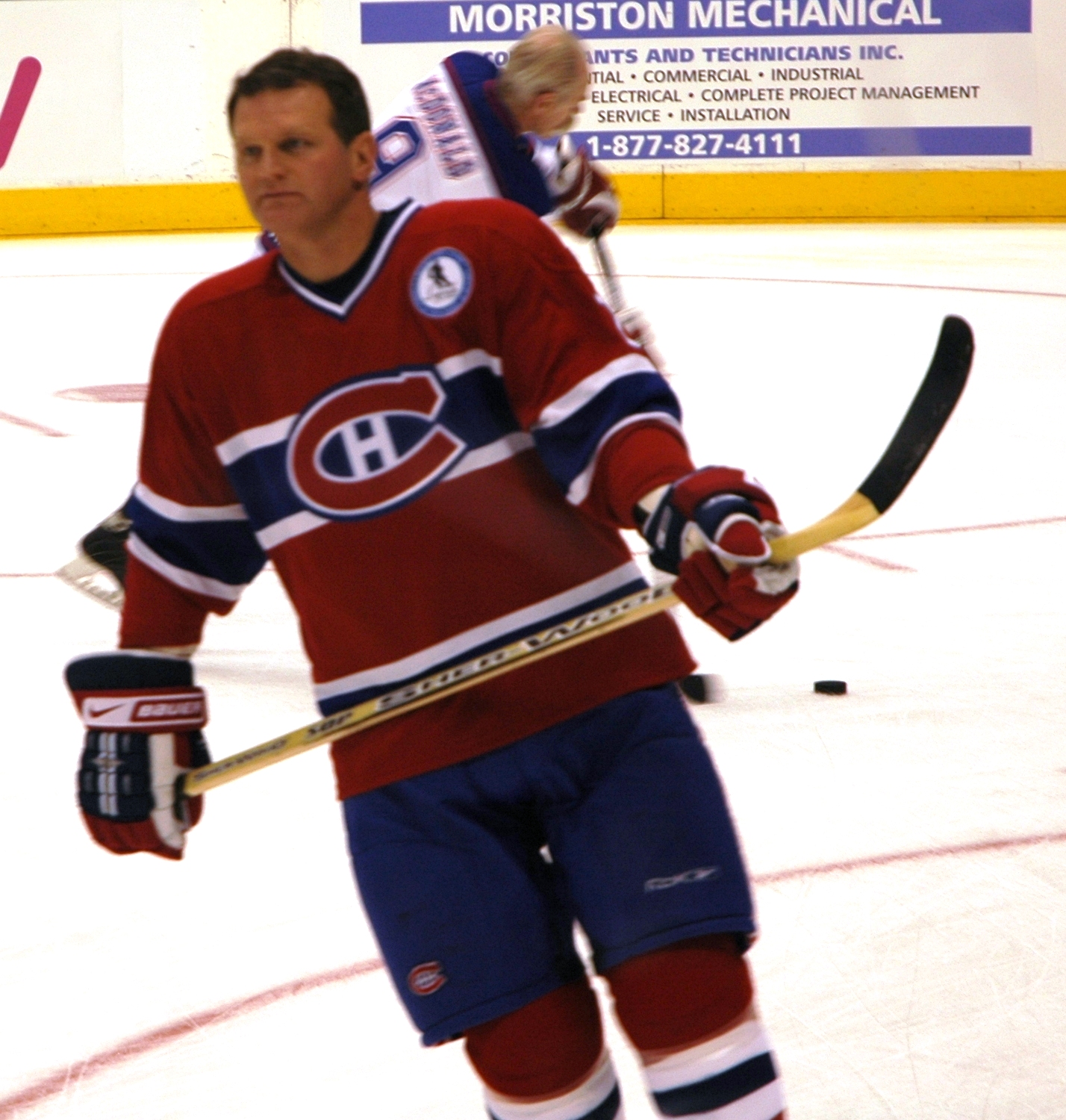
Vincent Damphousse led the Canadiens in playoff scoring in 1993, recording 23 points in 20 games.

The Canadiens entered the 1980s in transition, as Dryden, Lemaire and team captain Yvan Cournoyer announced their retirements in 1979, and Serge Savard followed suit in 1981. A trade during the 1982–83 season sent Rod Langway and Doug Jarvis to the Washington Capitals. Among their replacements were Swedish star Mats Naslund and forward Guy Carbonneau. Bob Gainey was appointed by the club to succeed Savard as team captain. Guy Lafleur remained the team's offensive star, recording his 1,000th career point in 1981 in just 720 games, the fastest anyone had reached that milestone in NHL history, and a record that stood until broken by Wayne Gretzky in 1984.

Doug Wickenheiser was selected by Montreal with the first pick at the 1980 NHL entry draft. The decision was highly controversial as the fans in Montreal had hoped the team would take francophone star Denis Savard. Wickenheiser's transition to the NHL was difficult; his popularity was harmed by comparisons of his struggles to Savard's immediate success with the Black Hawks. He was traded to the Blues midway through the 1983–84 season.

Gainey explained the changing fortunes of the franchise following their playoff defeat at the hands of the Nordiques in 1982: "We can't put on our sweaters anymore and expect to win." The Canadiens' mystique had been broken by consecutive playoff losses to the upstart Minnesota North Stars, the Oilers and the Nordiques. The loss to Quebec in 1982 was the culmination of a vicious series where the players attempted to hurt and intimidate their opponents, while the media argued over which team better represented francophone Quebec. Montreal's growing rivalry with Quebec peaked two years later in 1984 when they eliminated the Nordiques in six games, but not before the Good Friday Massacre made headlines. A hit by Quebec's Dale Hunter on Montreal goaltender Steve Penney sparked a bench-clearing brawl at the end of the second period. A second brawl, including some players who were ejected as a result of the first, erupted before the start of the third period. Ten players were ejected from the game, and 198 penalties in minutes were handed out as a result of the incidents, which proved a turning point in the game as Montreal scored five third period goals to win.

Rookie goaltender Patrick Roy led the Canadiens to their 23rd Stanley Cup championship in 1986 over the Calgary Flames in the first all-Canadian Stanley Cup Final since 1967. The 1986 Canadiens were young and led by rookie head coach Jean Perron and forward Claude Lemieux, in addition to Roy, who became the youngest player in NHL history to win the Conn Smythe Trophy. Brian Skrudland, another rookie, scored the game-winning goal just nine seconds into overtime of the second game of the finals — the fastest overtime goal in NHL history. The two teams met again in the 1989 Stanley Cup Final, the most recent all-Canadian Stanley Cup Finals, with the Flames emerging victorious in six games. It was the only time a visiting team defeated the Canadiens to win the Cup on Forum ice.

The Stanley Cup celebrated its 100th anniversary in 1993, returning again to Canada with the Canadiens' 24th Stanley Cup victory, the most recent NHL championship won by a Canadian team. After losing the first game of their Adams Division semi-final to the Quebec Nordiques in overtime, the Canadiens won ten overtime games en route to the title, setting an NHL record for most consecutive overtime victories in a playoff year. As with the 1986 championship, the team was led by Roy, who won his second Conn Smythe Trophy. The defining moment of the 1993 Stanley Cup Final occurred in the second game, with less than two minutes to play and Montreal trailing the series 1–0 and the game 2–1. Attempting to gain an advantage for his team, head coach Jacques Demers called for a measurement of Los Angeles Kings forward Marty McSorley's stick. Referee Kerry Fraser determined that the blade had an illegal curve, and assessed a penalty against McSorley. Montreal scored on the power play to tie the game, and then won in overtime 3–2, to tie the series. Montreal also won Games 3 and 4 in overtime before eliminating the Kings in Game 5, 4–1. The celebration was marred by one of the worst riots in Montreal history, as fans rioted through downtown Montreal causing over $2.5 million in property damage and 168 injuries.

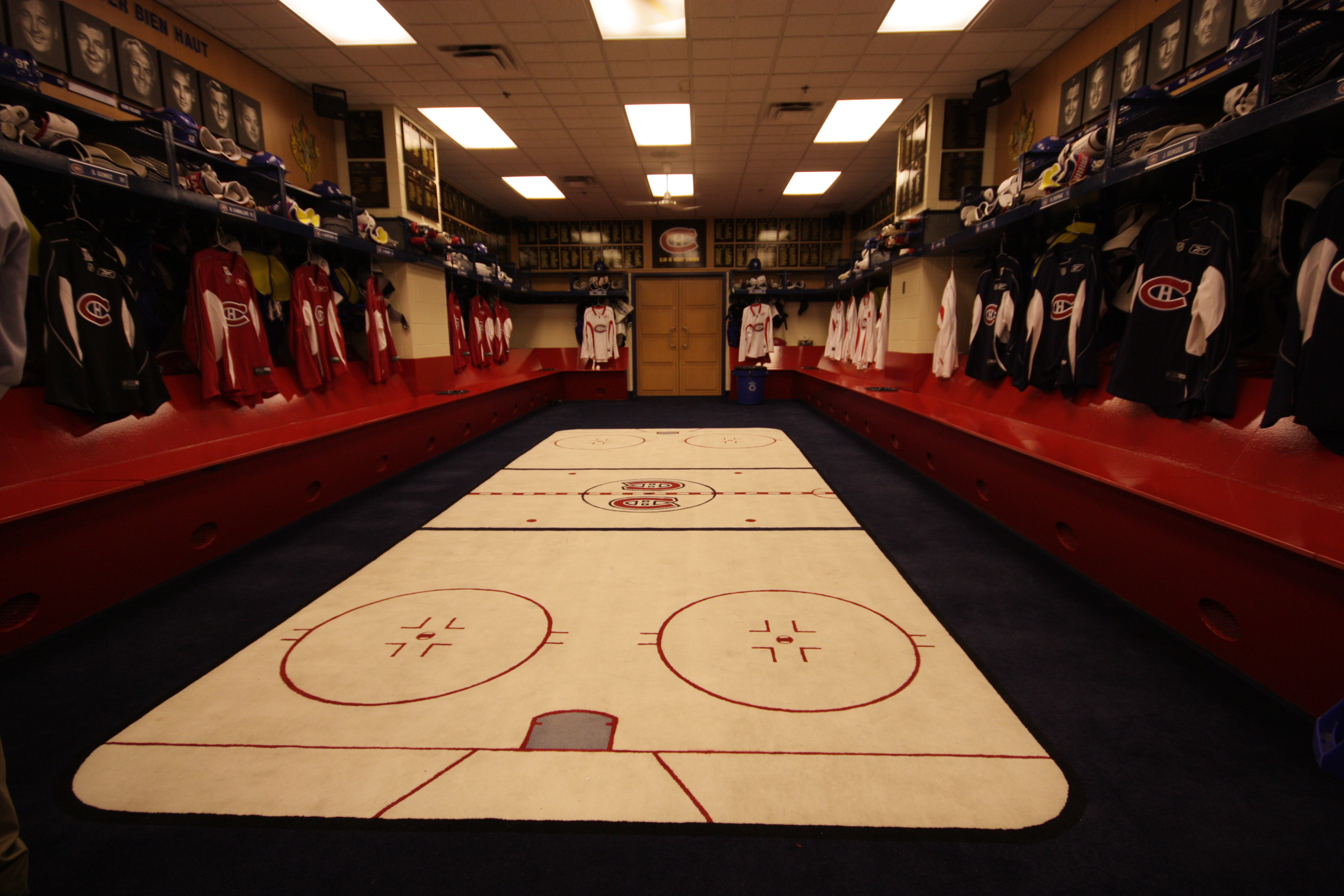
Montreal Canadiens locker room in the Bell Centre

The Canadiens failed to repeat their success in 1993–94, as the team was eliminated from the playoffs by the Bruins in seven games. Montreal's loss in game six was the last playoff game ever played at the Montreal Forum. The team missed the playoffs entirely in 1994–95, the first time in 25 years the Canadiens did not qualify, and the third time in 55 seasons. Montreal rebounded to make the playoffs in 1995–96, but the future of the team was altered on December 2, 1995, when the Canadiens were embarrassed 11–1 by the Red Wings. Patrick Roy allowed nine goals on 26 shots before he was pulled in the second period to mock cheers from the Montreal crowd. Roy was furious, and felt that head coach Mario Tremblay deliberately left him in to be embarrassed. After reaching the bench, he moved past Tremblay to Canadiens President Ronald Corey, who was seated in the first row, and declared, "This is my last game in Montreal."

Four days later, Roy was dealt to the Colorado Avalanche with Mike Keane in exchange for Jocelyn Thibault, Martin Ručinský and Andrei Kovalenko. The deal vaulted the Avalanche, the former Nordiques, to the 1996 Stanley Cup. Roy won another title with the Avalanche in 2001 along with a third Conn Smythe Trophy before retiring in 2003 with more wins than any NHL goaltender. The Canadiens, meanwhile, fell into an extended stretch of mediocrity, missing the playoffs in four of their next ten seasons and failing to advance past the second round of the playoffs until 2010. The team's lack of playoff success brought an end to its streak of winning a Stanley Cup in each decade from the 1910s to the 1990s.

The sport's changing economics led the Canadiens to build a new arena in 1996 to increase revenue. The final game at the Forum was held March 11, 1996, a 4–1 victory over the Dallas Stars. Following the game, an elaborate ceremony was held with many of the franchise's greatest members welcomed onto the rink. The most boisterous response was reserved for Maurice Richard, who received a ten-minute standing ovation. Finally, Emile Bouchard, the oldest living former captain, came onto the ice bearing a lit torch, and it was passed in a symbolic trail through the Canadiens' history: Bouchard passed it to Richard, who passed it to Jean Beliveau, and so on in chronological order to each former captain present, ending with Pierre Turgeon. In 72 years at the Forum, the Canadiens won over 1,500 games and captured 22 Stanley Cups.

== 1996–2009: New home and new owners ==
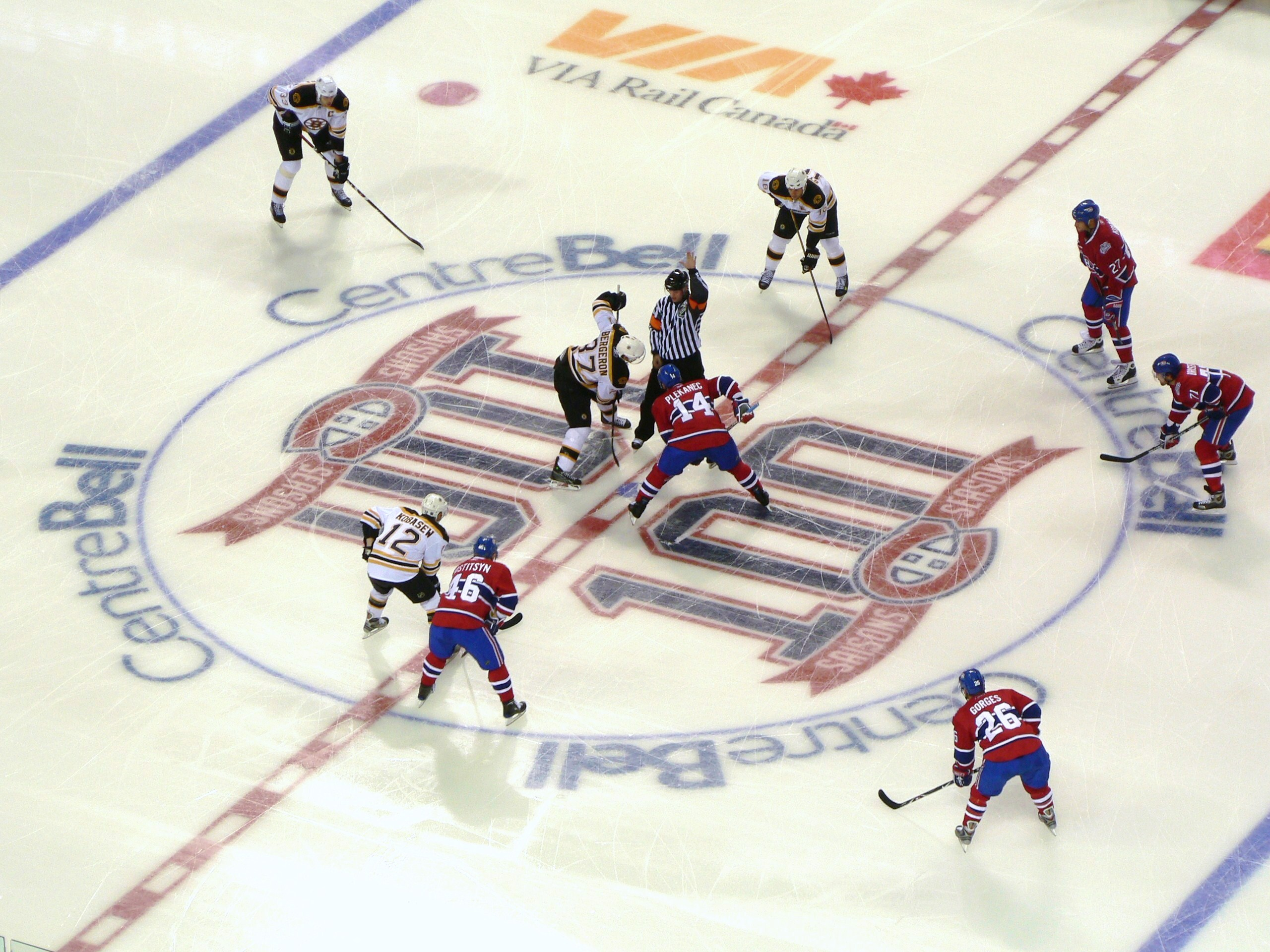
The Canadiens face the Bruins during their centennial season.

Five days after the closing of the Montreal Forum, the Canadiens played its first game at the Molson Centre (since renamed the Bell Centre). With a capacity of 22,500, the Bell Centre claims to be the largest indoor arena in North America. In the inaugural game, Montreal defeated the Rangers 4–2, with the first goal scored by Vincent Damphousse. The Canadiens qualified for the playoffs but struggled to achieve playoff success in the new arena during the arena's first three seasons. The Habs were eliminated in the first round of the playoffs by the Rangers in six games in 1996 and by the New Jersey Devils in 1997, respectively. In 1998, they won their first playoff series since their 1993 championship by defeating the Pittsburgh Penguins in six games; however, they would get swept by the Buffalo Sabres in the second round of the playoffs. It would be the last time the Canadiens would win a playoff series until 2002.

Montreal finished in last place in the Northeast Division in 1998–99 and missed the playoffs. Their 75 points was the lowest total in a full season in 40 years. The season concluded with rumours of the team being sold and relocated if it did not receive government subsidies to help alleviate pressures from Quebec's tax system and the record-low value of the Canadian dollar. The Canadiens denied the report, however Molson hired investment bank Morgan Stanley to examine its future involvement in sports. Montreal missed the playoffs again the next two seasons, and annual losses of $10–$12 million and a desire to focus on its core brewing business led Molson to put the franchise up for sale in the summer of 2001.

When no local buyers emerged for the team and a proposed Canadian government assistance program for the six remaining Canadian teams was canceled following public disapproval, it was feared that the Canadiens would follow the Winnipeg Jets and Quebec Nordiques in relocating to the United States. American businessman George N. Gillett Jr. purchased an 80.1% share of the team and 100% of the Molson Centre for $275 million. As part of the deal, Molson retained 19.9% of the team and were granted the right of first refusal for any future sale by Gillett; in addition, the NHL Board of Governors would be required to unanimously approve any attempt to move to a new city.

Following a poor start of 5–13–2 in their first 20 games of the 2000–01 season, the Canadiens fired head coach Alain Vigneault and promoted Michel Therrien to the position. The Habs would finish the season in last place in the Northeast Division with a record of 28–40–8–6.

Prior to the 2001–02 season, the club announced that captain Saku Koivu had been diagnosed with non-Hodgkin lymphoma and would miss the entire season. Koivu managed to return with three games left in the regular season, and along with goaltender Jose Theodore, who would win the Hart Trophy that year, led the Canadiens into the playoffs for the first time in four seasons. The eighth-seeded Canadiens upset the Boston Bruins in the first round of the playoffs, and Koivu led the team in playoff scoring with 10 points in 12 games. In recognition of his tenacity in returning from cancer treatment, the league voted Koivu as the Bill Masterton Memorial Trophy winner for dedication and perseverance. However, in the second round of the playoffs, the team was defeated by the Carolina Hurricanes in six games. The Canadiens finished fourth in the Northeast Division in the 2002–03 season, missing the playoffs by six points. After the Habs finished with a record of 18–19–5–4 in the first 48 games of the 2002–03 season, the team replaced Therrien with Claude Julien.

The first outdoor hockey game in NHL history, the Heritage Classic, was held on November 22, 2003, in Edmonton, Alberta, at Commonwealth Stadium. The Canadiens defeated the Oilers 4–3 in front of an NHL-record crowd of 57,167, who braved temperatures of −20 °C (−4 °F). The success of the Heritage Classic led to the creation of the Winter Classic, an annual outdoor game held since 2008. In the 2004 playoffs, the seventh-seeded Canadiens upset the Bruins in seven games in the first round, but they were later defeated by the Tampa Bay Lightning in a four-game sweep in the second round.

The 2004–05 NHL lockout cancelled the 2004–05 season entirely. After the Montreal Expos franchise departed for Washington, D.C., in 2005, the Canadiens acquired former Expos mascot Youppi to serve as their first-ever mascot. Having missed the playoffs in 2006–07, the Canadiens rebounded to win their first division title in 15 years in 2007–08, as well as their first regular season conference title since 1989.

== 2009–present: Molson family acquires team ==
Ownership of the Canadiens once again passed to the Molson family in 2009 after Gillett sold the team, Bell Centre, and Gillett Entertainment Group to a partnership headed by Geoff Molson and including his brothers Andrew and Justin. The sale price was estimated at over $600 million. Unlike the pre-Gillett era, the team is now privately owned by the Molson family and not by the Molson brewery, which is now a division of Molson Coors. The reputed sale price reflected a return to profitability, due both to a new collective bargaining agreement after the 2004–05 lockout that fixed player costs to revenues and to a rise in the value of the Canadian dollar back to at or near parity with the U.S. dollar.

On the ice, the team reached the 2010 playoffs as the eighth seed for the second year in a row, yet upset the top-seeded Washington Capitals and the then-defending Stanley Cup champion Pittsburgh Penguins in the first two rounds. The Habs lost the Eastern Conference finals to the Philadelphia Flyers.

The NHL revived the Heritage Classic concept, with the Canadiens facing the Calgary Flames at McMahon Stadium in Calgary on February 20, 2011. The Flames defeated the Canadiens, by a score of 4–0, before a crowd of 41,022 spectators. The 2011 Heritage Classic was the second outdoors game held during the 2010–11 season, following the 2011 NHL Winter Classic.

The Habs finished the 2011–12 season last in their conference for the first time in over 80 years, as injuries decimated the team all season. After a disappointing season, the Canadiens started over in the front office. They fired General Manager Pierre Gauthier, and Marc Bergevin was named the new general manager on May 2, 2012. The search then began for a new head coach and on June 5, Michel Therrien was named the new head coach. This would be Therrien's second stint as the Canadiens head coach after he previously coached the team from 2000 to 2003; and Randy Cunneyworth and Randy Ladouceur were relieved of their assistant coaching duties. On June 15, Gerard Gallant, J. J. Daigneault and Clement Jodoin were added to Montreal's coaching staff as assistant coaches.

The team rebounded in the lockout-shortened 2012–13 season, moving up from 15th place to second, but lost 4–1 in the first round against the Ottawa Senators, their fourth-straight playoff series loss. Defenceman P. K. Subban was awarded the James Norris Memorial Trophy as the League's best defenseman, the first since Chris Chelios in 1989. The next season, the Canadiens made the playoffs yet again following a 100-point season and in the first round, eliminated the Tampa Bay Lightning in a four-game series sweep. They then faced the reigning Presidents' Trophy-winning Boston Bruins, and eliminated them in seven games to make the Eastern Conference Finals for the second time since their 1993 Stanley Cup victory and the first time since 2010. During game one against the New York Rangers, Chris Kredier ran into Carey Price injuring his leg. Carey Price wouldn't return with the Canadiens as they fell to the Rangers in six games.

In the 2014–15 season, the team won their third division title since 1992 and proceeded to defeat the Senators in six games in the first round. However, they lost in the second round to the Lightning in six games. The season was successful due to a strong performance by goaltender Carey Price, who won the Vezina Trophy, the Hart Memorial Trophy and the Ted Lindsay Award, in addition to sharing the William M. Jennings Trophy for the fewest goals allowed during the regular season.

The Habs started the 2015–16 season with a nine-game winning streak, and posted an 18–4–3 record in the first two months of the season. However, after winning 19 of their first 26 games, the team struggled offensively and lost many players, including Price, to injuries. The Canadiens ultimately finished sixth in the Atlantic Division and did not qualify for the playoffs for the first time since the 2011–12 season. The team participated for the first time in the NHL Winter Classic, defeating the Boston Bruins.

On November 4, 2016, goaltender Al Montoya allowed 10 goals in a 10–0 Canadiens road loss to the Columbus Blue Jackets; the Habs later scored 10 goals in a 10–1 home win over the Colorado Avalanche on December 10, 2016. While the team started the 2016–17 season with a record of 13–1–1 in their first 15 games, they only went 18–18–7 in next 41 games but would remain in first place in the Atlantic Division through the first 56 games of the season. As a result, the Habs fired Therrien and replaced him with Claude Julien on February 14, 2017; this was the second time that Julien (who was fired by the Bruins on February 7) replaced Therrien as head coach in the history of the Canadiens franchise. On March 30, 2017, the Canadiens qualified for the playoffs after a 6–2 home victory against the Florida Panthers; they would clinch the Atlantic Division title a few days later. Despite winning their second division title in the past three seasons, the Habs would ultimately lose their first round playoff series to the Rangers in six games.

The Canadiens failed to reach the playoffs in each of the next two seasons, entering a period of rebuilding that saw them trade away veteran faces like Tomáš Plekanec, Alex Galchenyuk, Andrew Shaw and Max Pacioretty. In 2020, the Canadiens sat in 12th place in the Eastern Conference with a 31–31–9 record when the league shut down due to the COVID-19 pandemic. When the season resumed in August 2020, Montreal was one the last of 12 Eastern Conference teams invited to partake in a bubbled postseason tournament in Toronto. Seeded 12th, the Canadiens took on the Pittsburgh Penguins in a best-of-five series during the Eastern Conference's Qualifying Round where they defeated the Penguins in four games. Jeff Petry's overtime goal set the tone for the series in Game 1, while Price stopped 22 shots in a shutout effort in the clincher to give the Canadiens a 3–1 series win. The team then battled the top-seeded Philadelphia Flyers in the best-of-seven first round, but lost in six games.

For the 2020–21 NHL season, the Canadiens were paired with the other six Canada-based squads in the North Division, a temporary set-up while the league operated its season amidst the health crisis. In the midst of the season, Julien was fired on February 24, 2021, and was replaced by assistant coach Dominique Ducharme. Montreal took the last of four playoff spots in the North, facing their top-seeded rivals from Toronto in the first round. It was the first playoff matchup between the Canadiens and Maple Leafs since 1979. Toronto jumped out to a 3–1 series lead, but the Canadiens responded with three consecutive victories, the first two coming in overtime. Montreal swept the third-seeded Winnipeg Jets in four games, earning the last victory on an overtime goal by Tyler Toffoli. In the following round, Montreal defeated the Vegas Golden Knights with a game six overtime goal by Artturi Lehkonen, advancing to its first Stanley Cup Final appearance since 1993. The Canadiens also became the first Canadian team to advance to the finals since 2011. The run would end however with the Canadiens losing in the Finals to the Tampa Bay Lightning in five games.

On July 23, 2021, Bergevin announced that the Canadiens were "proud to select" Logan Mailloux with the 31st pick of the 2021 NHL entry draft. Mailloux had been convicted of sexual misconduct in a Swedish court for distributing a sexually-explicit image of an 18-year-old woman to his teammates without her consent. Further, Mailloux had previously announced that he was withdrawing from the draft, on the grounds that he lacked the "maturity and character" required to "earn the privilege" of being drafted. Canadian Prime Minister Justin Trudeau, a lifelong Canadiens fan, announced that he was "deeply disappointed" by Bergevin's decision to select Mailloux, and stated that the selection demonstrated a lack of judgment on the part of the Canadiens. Isabelle Charest, Quebec's Minister for the Status of Women, expressed that she was also surprised and disappointed by the pick.

In 2021–22, the Canadiens were unable to replicate their success from the prior season, ultimately finishing last in the league for the first time since the 1939–40 NHL season and the first time in the NHL's expansion era, in one of the worst seasons in the team's history. In the process they set team records for most regulation losses (49), most goals against (319), fewest wins (22), and fewest points (55), while its .335 point percentage was the team's third-worst ever, after only 1925–26 (.319) and 1939–40 (.260). After the team started the season 6–15–2, owner Molson fired Bergevin, amateur scouting chief Trevor Timmins, and communications head Paul Wilson, hiring former New York Rangers general manager Jeff Gorton to serve as executive vice president of hockey operations, tasked with hiring a new general manager for the team. Gorton subsequently hired Kent Hughes for the position. Gorton and Hughes announced plans to modernize team operations.

As a result of the team's last-place finish in the 2021–22 season, the Canadiens won the draft lottery to select first overall in the NHL entry draft for the first time in 42 years.

== Retired numbers ==
| No. | Player | Date retired |
|---|---|---|
| 1 | Jacques Plante | October 7, 1995 |
| 2 | Doug Harvey | October 26, 1985 |
| 3 | Emile Bouchard | December 4, 2009 |
| 4 | Jean Beliveau | October 9, 1971 |
| 5 | Bernie Geoffrion | March 11, 2006 |
| 5 | Guy Lapointe | November 8, 2014 |
| 7 | Howie Morenz | November 2, 1937 |
| 9 | Maurice Richard | October 6, 1960 |
| 10 | Guy Lafleur | February 16, 1985 |
| 12 | Dickie Moore | November 12, 2005 |
| 12 | Yvan Cournoyer | November 12, 2005 |
| 16 | Henri Richard | December 10, 1975 |
| 16 | Elmer Lach | December 4, 2009 |
| 18 | Serge Savard | November 18, 2006 |
| 19 | Larry Robinson | November 19, 2007 |
| 23 | Bob Gainey | February 23, 2008 |
| 29 | Ken Dryden | January 29, 2007 |
| 33 | Patrick Roy | November 22, 2008 |

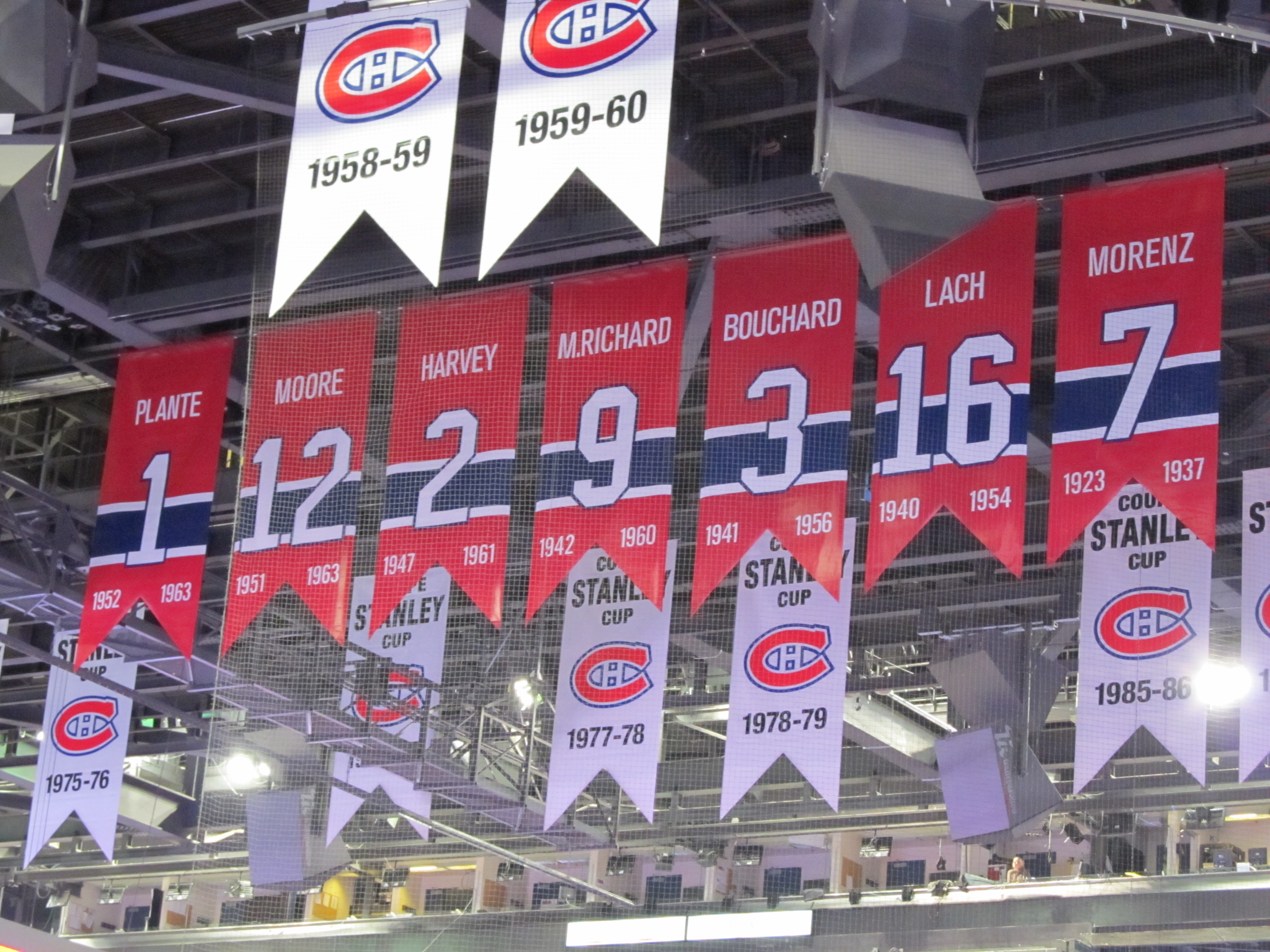
Some of the Canadiens' retired numbers and Stanley Cup championship banners atop the Bell Centre.

The Canadiens have retired 15 numbers, honouring 18 players. Howie Morenz's number 7 was the first jersey to be retired, shortly after his death in 1937. Maurice Richard's number 9 followed in 1960; his 544 career goals are a franchise record. Henri Richard, brother of Maurice, was honoured in 1975 with the retirement of his number 16, after 21 seasons and 11 Stanley Cups with the Canadiens. Henri holds the franchise games-played record with 1256.

Jean Beliveau's number 4 was retired in 1971 after he left the game as the all-time leading scorer in Stanley Cup playoff history. Beliveau was offered, but declined, the position of Governor General of Canada in 1994; he is the only hockey player known to have been asked to serve in this capacity. Guy Lafleur's number 10 followed in February 1985 after his first retirement. Lafleur was a six-time All-Star with the Canadiens, and won three scoring titles and two most valuable player awards. Also in 1985, Doug Harvey's number 2 was raised to the rafters. The defenceman won six Norris Trophies as the NHL's top defenceman in seven years between 1955 and 1961. Jacques Plante's number 1 was retired on October 17, 1995. Plante revolutionized the way goaltenders played the game, and he leads the Canadiens with 314 career wins.

Leading up to their centennial year, the Canadiens retired the jerseys of several players. They began with three former greats during the 2005–06 season. Montreal first retired the number 12 in honour of both Dickie Moore and Yvan Cournoyer. Moore was a member of the Canadiens' dynasty of 1956–1960, while Cournoyer won ten titles between 1965 and 1979. Bernie Geoffrion was the third player honoured by the Canadiens. Nicknamed "Boom Boom", Geoffrion was considered the innovator of the slapshot. He died on March 11, 2006, the same day his number 5 was retired.

Serge Savard's number 18 was retired on November 18, 2006. Savard also served as the team's general manager for ten years. His defensive partner Larry Robinson's number 19 was retired one year later, as was Bob Gainey's number 23. Gainey was considered one of the game's elite defensive forwards, winning four Selke Trophies and five Stanley Cups before serving as coach and general manager of the team. Patrick Roy's number 33 was retired on November 22, 2008. Roy's jersey retirement was a return "back to the Canadiens family" for the Hall of Fame goaltender, who had not maintained a relationship with the organization after his trade demand in 1995. Emile Bouchard's number 3, and Elmer Lach's number 16 were retired on December 4, 2009, as part of the team's centennial celebration. (Lach had played as 16 before Richard did.) They retired Guy Lapointe's number 5 during the 2014–15 season.

=== Builders Row ===
The Canadiens created "Builders Row" in 2006 to honour the off-ice members of the club who helped lead the team to success. Seven people were initially inducted: team founder Ambrose O'Brien; former owners Leo Dandurand, Joseph Cattarinich, Louis A. Letourneau and Hartland Molson; former team president Donat Raymond; and special advisor William Northey. In 2008, the team added its three legendary coaches to the Row: Dick Irvin Sr., Toe Blake and Scotty Bowman. The three served a combined 36 years behind the Canadiens' bench from 1940 to 1979.

== Hockey Hall of Famers ==
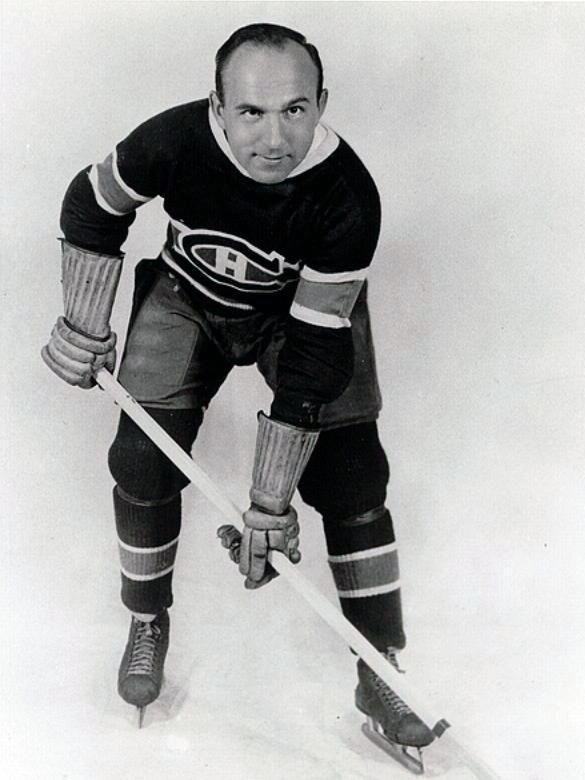
Howie Morenz was a member of the first class of Hall of Fame inductees in 1945.

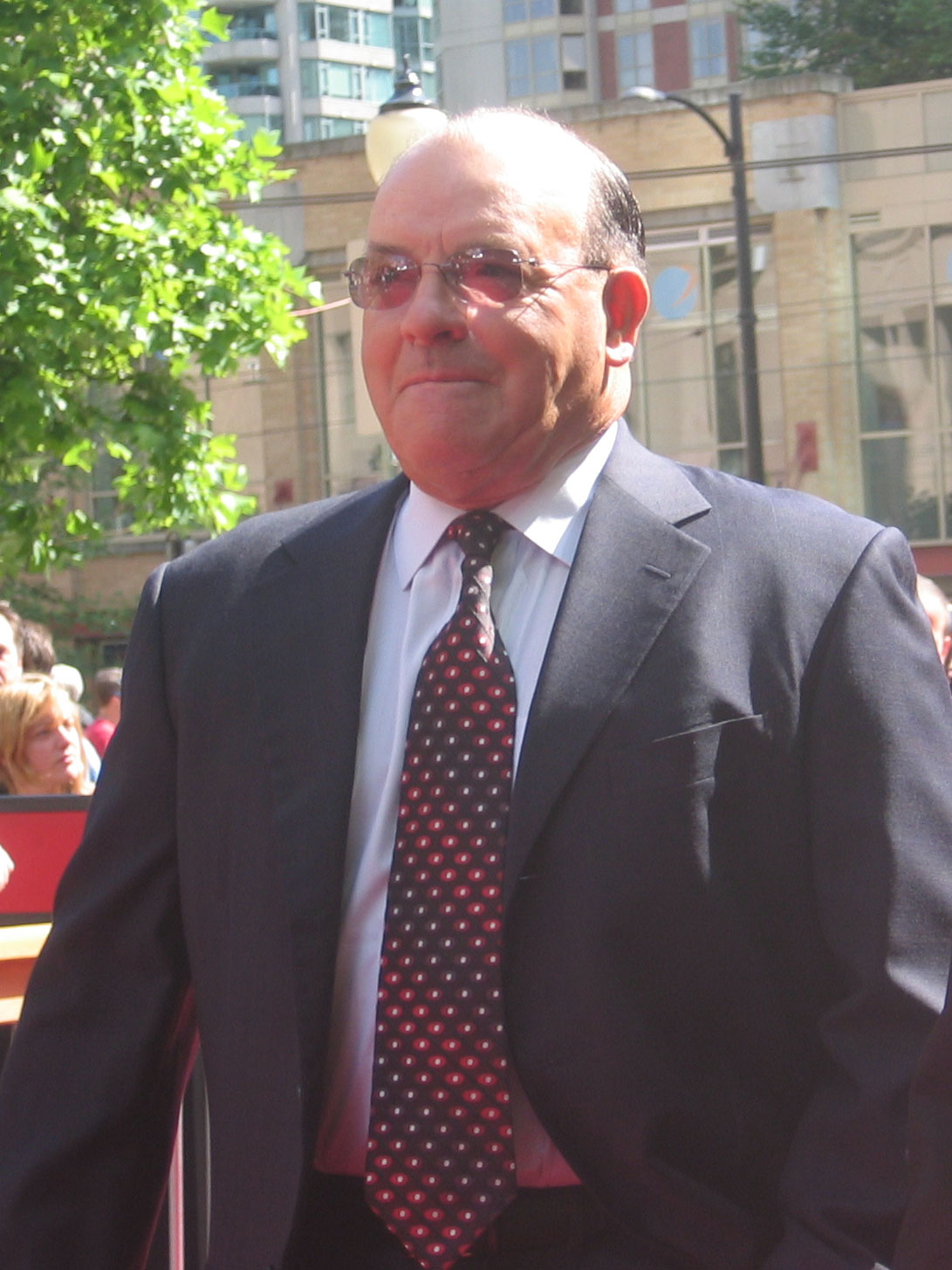
Scotty Bowman coached the Habs to five Stanley Cups in the 1970s.

The Hockey Hall of Fame was created in 1945 with nine initial player inductees, including two Canadiens: Howie Morenz and Georges Vezina. Morenz was considered hockey's first superstar, and in 1950 was voted the top hockey player of the half-century. Vezina perfected the "stand up" style of goaltending in an era when goaltenders were not allowed to drop to their knees to cover the puck, and became the standard by which future goaltenders judged themselves.

Maurice Richard, inducted in 1961, and Jean Beliveau, inducted in 1972, are two of ten players for whom the selection committee has waived the otherwise-mandatory three-year waiting period before being eligible for induction. Defenceman Doug Harvey was unanimously elected in 1973, one year after being denied entry due to his drinking habits. Angered by the snub, Harvey refused his induction, stating that he planned to go fishing instead of attending the induction ceremony. Guy Lafleur was one of three players in NHL history (along with Gordie Howe and Mario Lemieux) to return to playing after being elected. Lafleur, who had first retired in 1984 after growing frustrated with the Canadiens' defence-focused system, returned to the league days after his 1988 election, playing for the New York Rangers and Quebec Nordiques before finally retiring in 1991.

As of 2009, over 50 former Canadiens players have been elected to the Hall of Fame.

Players
| Player | Position | Inducted | Player | Position | Inducted | Player | Position | Inducted |
| Howie Morenz | C | 1945 | Marty Barry | C | 1965 | Ken Dryden | G | 1983 |
| Georges Vezina | G | 1945 | Toe Blake | LW | 1966 | Jacques Lemaire | C | 1984 |
| Aurel Joliat | LW | 1947 | Emile Bouchard | D | 1966 | Bert Olmstead | RW | 1985 |
| Newsy Lalonde | C | 1950 | Elmer Lach | C | 1966 | Serge Savard | D | 1986 |
| Joe Malone | C | 1950 | Ken Reardon | D | 1966 | Jacques Laperriere | D | 1987 |
| Sprague Cleghorn | D | 1958 | Roy Worters | G | 1969 | Tony Esposito | G | 1988 |
| Herb Gardiner | LW | 1958 | Tom Johnson | D | 1970 | Guy Lafleur | RW | 1988 |
| Sylvio Mantha | D | 1960 | Jean Beliveau | C | 1972 | Bud O'Connor | RW | 1988 |
| Joe Hall | D | 1961 | Bernie Geoffrion | RW | 1972 | Bob Gainey | LW | 1992 |
| George Hainsworth | G | 1961 | Doug Harvey | D | 1973 | Guy Lapointe | D | 1993 |
| Maurice Richard | RW | 1961 | Tommy Smith | C | 1973 | Steve Shutt | LW | 1993 |
| Reg Noble | F | 1962 | Dickie Moore | LW | 1974 | Larry Robinson | D | 1995 |
| Harry Cameron | D | 1963 | Gordie Drillon | RW | 1975 | Denis Savard | C | 2000 |
| Jimmy Gardner | F | 1963 | Jacques Plante | G | 1978 | Rod Langway | D | 2002 |
| Jack Laviolette | D | 1963 | Henri Richard | C | 1979 | Dick Duff | LW | 2006 |
| Didier Pitre | D | 1963 | Gump Worsley | G | 1980 | Patrick Roy | G | 2006 |
| Bill Durnan | G | 1964 | Frank Mahovlich | LW | 1981 | Doug Gilmour | C | 2011 |
| Babe Siebert | LW | 1964 | Yvan Cournoyer | RW | 1982 | Chris Chelios | D | 2013 |
| Rogie Vachon | G | 2016 | Mark Recchi | RW | 2017 | Guy Carbonneau | C | 2019 |
| Pierre Turgeon | C | 2023 | Shea Weber | D | 2024 | | | |
Builders
| Builder | | Inducted | Builder | | Inducted | Builder | | Inducted |
| William Northey | | 1947 | Leo Dandurand | | 1963 | Sam Pollock | | 1978 |
| Donat Raymond | | 1958 | Tommy Gorman | | 1963 | Scotty Bowman | | 1991 |
| Frank J. Selke | | 1960 | Hartland Molson | | 1973 | Pat Burns | | 2014 |
| Ambrose O'Brien | | 1962 | Joseph Cattarinich | | 1977 | | | |

Source: Hockey Hall of Fame

== See also ==
- List of Montreal Canadiens seasons
- History of the National Hockey League
- List of Stanley Cup champions

== Bibliography ==
- Diamond, Dan (1991), The Official National Hockey League 75th Anniversary Commemorative Book, McClelland & Stewart, ISBN 0-7710-6727-5
- Diamond, Dan; Zweig, Eric (2003), Hockey's Glory Days: The 1950s and '60s, Andrews McMeel Publishing, ISBN 0-7407-3829-1
- Hockey Hall of Fame (2003). Honoured Members: Hockey Hall of Fame. Bolton, Ontario: Fenn Publishing. ISBN 1-55168-239-7.
- Holzman, Morey; Nieforth, Joseph (2002), Deceptions and Doublecross: How the NHL Conquered Hockey, Dundurn Press, ISBN 1-55002-413-2
- Hynes, Jim (2016), Miracle Moments in Montreal Canadiens History: The Turning Points, The Memorable Games, The Incredible Records, Skyhorse Publishing, ISBN 978-1-61321-983-6 (Numberless book pages consulted online via Google Books)
- Jenish, D'Arcy (2009), The Montreal Canadiens: 100 Years of Glory, Anchor Canada, ISBN 978-0-385-66325-0
- Kay, Jason, ed. (2009), "A Century of Montreal Canadiens", The Hockey News, ISSN 0018-3016
- McFarlane, Brian (1990), 100 Years of Hockey, Summerhill Press, ISBN 0-929091-26-4
- McFarlane, Brian (1996), The Habs, Stoddart Publishing, ISBN 0-7737-2981-X
- McFarlane, Brian (2004), Best of the Original Six, Fenn Publishing Company, ISBN 1-55168-306-7
- McKinley, Michael (2006), Hockey: A People's History, McClelland & Stewart, ISBN 0-7710-5769-5
- McKinley, Michael (2012), Hockey Night in Canada: 60 Seasons, Penguin Canada, ISBN 978-0-14-318672-4
- O'Brien, Andy (1971), Les Canadiens, McGraw-Hill Ryerson, ISBN 0-07-077510-9
- Pincus, Arthur (2006), The Official Illustrated NHL History, Reader's Digest, ISBN 1-57243-445-7
- Sandor, Steven (2005), The Battle of Alberta: A Century of Hockey's Greatest Rivalry, Heritage House, ISBN 1-894974-01-8
- Willes, Ed (2004), The Rebel League: The Short and Unruly Life of the World Hockey Association, McClelland & Stewart, ISBN 0-7710-8947-3
