= Georges Vézina =

Canadian ice hockey player (1887–1926)

- Hockey Hall of Fame, 1945
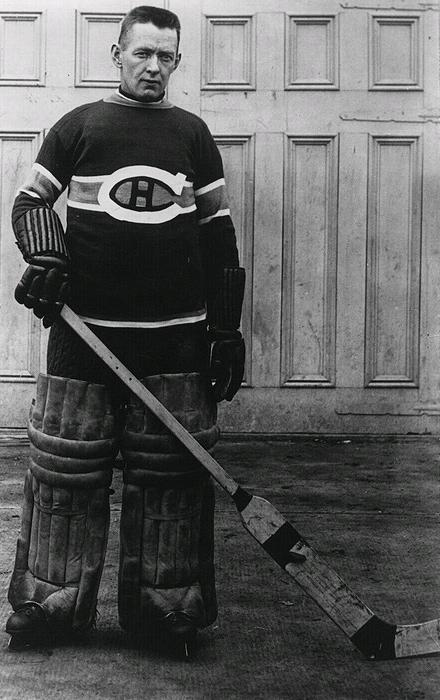
- Born: January 21, 1887 Chicoutimi, Quebec, Canada
- Died: March 27, 1926 (aged 39) Chicoutimi, Quebec, Canada
- Height: 5 ft 6 in (168 cm)
- Weight: 185 lb (84 kg; 13 st 3 lb)
- Position: Goaltender
- Caught: Left
- Played for: Montreal Canadiens
- Playing career: 1910–1925

Joseph Georges Gonzague Vézina (/ˈvɛzɪnə/; French: [ʒɔʁʒ vezina]; January 21, 1887 – March 27, 1926) was a Canadian professional ice hockey player. A goaltender, he played seven seasons in the National Hockey Association (NHA) and nine in the National Hockey League (NHL), all with the Montreal Canadiens. After being signed by the Canadiens in 1910, Vézina played in 327 consecutive regular season games and a further 39 playoff games, before leaving early during a game in 1925 due to illness. Vézina was diagnosed with tuberculosis, and died on March 27, 1926.

The only goaltender to play for the Canadiens between 1910 and 1925, Vézina helped the team win the Stanley Cup in 1916 and 1924, while reaching the Stanley Cup Final three more times. Nicknamed the "Chicoutimi Cucumber" for his calm composure while in goal, Vézina allowed the fewest goals in the league seven times in his career: four times in the NHA and three times in the NHL. In 1918, Vézina became the first NHL goaltender to both record a shutout and earn an assist on a goal. At the start of the 1926–27 NHL season, the Canadiens donated the Vezina Trophy to the NHL as an award to the goaltender who allowed the fewest goals during the season. Since 1981, the award has been given to the most outstanding goaltender as determined by a vote of NHL general managers. In Vézina's hometown of Chicoutimi, the sports arena is named the Centre Georges-Vézina in his honour. When the Hockey Hall of Fame opened in 1945, Vézina was one of the original nine inductees, and in 2017 the NHL included him on their list of the 100 greatest players in league history.

== Personal life ==
Georges, the fifth of eight children, was born on January 21, 1887, in Chicoutimi, Quebec, to Georges-Henri Vézina, a local baker and his wife Clara Belley. Georges attended school at the Petit Séminaire de Chicoutimi from 1898 until the age of fourteen, when he left the school to help at his father's bakery. He played hockey from a young age, participating in informal street hockey matches with others his own age. Vézina partook in these matches in his shoes, and used skates for the first time at age 16 when he joined the local team in Chicoutimi. As Chicoutimi was in a remote area of Quebec, more than 200 kilometres from Quebec City, the hockey club was not in any organised league. Rather the club, known as the Saguenéens ("People from the Saguenay", the region where Chicoutimi is located), toured the province, playing exhibition games against a variety of clubs.

Vézina married Marie-Adélaïde-Stella Morin on June 3, 1908, in Chicoutimi. After Vézina's death, it was reported that he had fathered 22 children. This rumour was started when the Canadiens' manager, Léo Dandurand, told reporters that Vézina "speaks no English and has twenty-two children, including three sets of triplets, and they were all born in the space of nine years." In actuality the Vézinas only had two children and Georges spoke broken English. In 1912 they had their first child, a son named Jean-Jules. A second son was born the night of the Montreal Canadiens' first Stanley Cup win in 1916. To honour the event, Georges named the child Marcel Stanley. When not playing hockey, Vézina operated a tannery in Chicoutimi, living a quiet life.

== Playing career ==
=== NHA ===
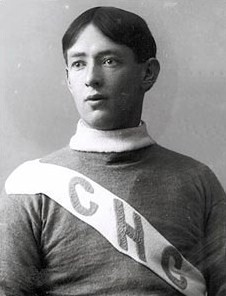
Vézina while a member of the Chicoutimi Hockey Club

On February 17, 1910, the Chicoutimi Hockey Club played an exhibition match against the Montreal Canadiens. Though playing an inferior team the Canadiens failed to score a goal, losing the game. This prompted Joseph Cattarinich, goaltender for the Canadiens, to convince his team to offer a tryout to Georges Vézina, who was Chicoutimi's goaltender. Vézina initially refused the offer, staying in Chicoutimi until the Canadiens returned in December of that year. This time they convinced Georges, along with his brother Pierre, to come to Montreal. The two Vézina brothers arrived on December 22, 1910. While Pierre failed to make the team, Georges impressed the Canadiens, especially with the use of his stick to block shots. Vézina was signed to a contract for C$800 per season, and made his professional debut December 31, 1910, against the Ottawa Senators. He would play all 16 games for the Canadiens in the 1910–11 season, finishing with a record of eight wins and eight losses, while allowing the fewest goals in the league.

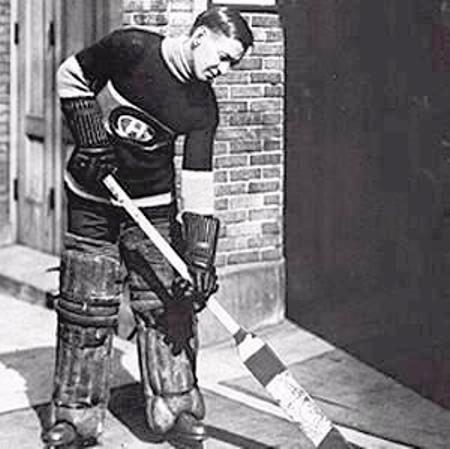
Georges Vézina with the Canadiens early in his career

The following season Vézina again led the league in goals against, as well as winning eight games, along with 10 losses. Vézina recorded his first career shutout during the 1912–13 season, defeating Ottawa 6–0 on January 18, 1913, for one of his nine wins in the season. The Canadiens finished first in the NHA for the first time in 1913–14, in a tie with the Toronto Blueshirts. Once again, Vézina led the league with the fewest goals against, while posting 13 victories and seven losses. Under the NHA rules, the first place team would play in the Stanley Cup Final, but due to the tie for first, the Canadiens had to play a two-game, total-goals series against Toronto. Vézina shut out the Blueshirts in the first game, a 2–0 win for Montreal, but let in six goals in the second game, allowing the Blueshirts to play for the Stanley Cup, which they won.

After losing 14 games and finishing last in the NHA in 1914–15, Vézina and the Canadiens won 16 games during the 1915–16 season, placing the team first in the league. As league leaders, the Canadiens earned the right to play in the 1916 Stanley Cup Final, where they faced off against the Portland Rosebuds, champions of the rival Pacific Coast Hockey Association. The Canadiens defeated the Rosebuds three games to two in the best-of-five-games series, winning the Stanley Cup for the first time in team history. Vézina's second son was born the night of the fifth game, which coupled with a bonus of $238 each member of the Canadiens received for the championship, led to him considering the series as the pinnacle of his career. The following season Vézina again led the NHA with the fewest goals against, the fourth time in seven years he did so, helping the Canadiens to again reach the Stanley Cup Final, where they lost to the Seattle Metropolitans.

=== NHL ===
The NHA gave way to the National Hockey League (NHL) in November 1917, with Vézina and the Canadiens joining the new league. On February 18, 1918, he became the first goaltender in NHL history to record a shutout, by blanking the Torontos 9–0. He finished the season with 12 wins, allowing the fewest goals against. Vézina also set a record, which was shared with Clint Benedict of the Ottawa Senators, for the fewest shutouts needed to lead the league, with one.

During the 1918–19 Vézina became the first goaltender to be credited with an assist: during a December 28, 1918 game against Toronto, Vézina made a save and gave the puck to Newsy Lalonde, who immediately scored. Vézina won 10 games during the season and helped the Canadiens defeat the Ottawa Senators in the NHL playoffs for the right to play for the Stanley Cup against the PCHA champion, the Seattle Metropolitans. Held in Seattle, the two teams were tied in the best-of-five series when it was cancelled due to the Spanish flu epidemic, the first time the Stanley Cup was not awarded. In the 10 playoff games prior to the cancellation, Vézina had won six games, lost three and tied one, with one shutout. Vézina recorded nearly identical records the next two seasons, with 13 wins, 11 losses and a goals against average above four in both 1919–20 and 1920–21. He won 12 games the following season, as the Canadiens again failed to qualify for the Stanley Cup.

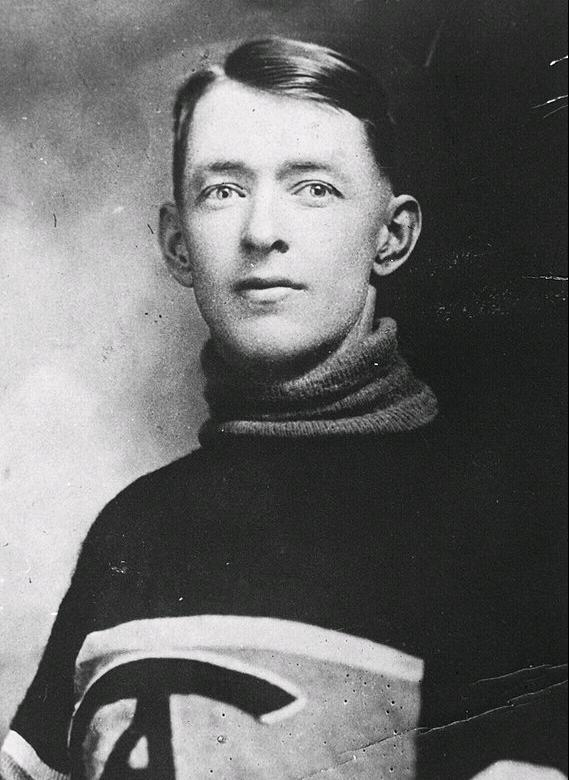
Georges Vézina c. 1919–21. He led the Canadiens to their first two Stanley Cup championships.

After winning 13 games in 1922–23, Vézina led the Canadiens into the NHL playoffs, where they lost the two-game, total-goal series to the Senators, who would win the Stanley Cup. The following season saw Vézina return to leading the league in fewest goals against. His average of 1.97 goals per game was the first time a goaltender had averaged fewer than two goals against per game. With another 13-win season in 1923–24, the Canadiens reached the NHL playoffs, where they again faced the Ottawa Senators. This time the Canadiens won the series, then defeated the Vancouver Maroons of the PCHA before reaching the Stanley Cup Final for the first time in five years. Playing the Calgary Tigers of the Western Canada Hockey League, Vézina and the Canadiens won the best-of-three series two games to none, as Vézina recorded a shutout in the second game. The championship was the Canadiens' first as a member of the NHL and second title as a club. After a 17-win season in 1924–25 where Vézina recorded a goals-against average of 1.81 to again lead the league, the Canadiens reached the Stanley Cup Final. The Canadiens only qualified after the Hamilton Tigers, the regular season champions, were suspended for refusing to play in the playoffs unless they were paid more. Facing the Victoria Cougars, the Canadiens lost the series three games to one.

Returning to Montreal for training camp for the 1925–26 season, Vézina was noticeably ill, though it was diagnosed as a severe cold which led to a persistent fever. By December 28, 1925, his fever had reached 102 °F but he insisted on playing against the Pittsburgh Pirates. Contemporary accounts show that he was remarkable, as if his illness was not fazing him at all, but once in the locker room, his headache had worsened, so he lay down on the rubbing table. Whether he took himself out of the game or he was forced out is unclear, but former U.S. Olympic team goaltender Alphonse Lacroix, who had been signed before the season, was tasked with replacing him for the remaining periods. Contrary to popular myths, he neither collapsed nor vomited blood. Pittsburgh defeated Montreal 1 to 0, with Roy Worters being credited with a shutout.

The day after the game, Vézina was diagnosed with tuberculosis and advised to return home. He made a last trip into the Canadiens' dressing room on December 3 to formally retire. Dandurand would later describe Vézina as sitting in his corner of the dressing room with "tears rolling down his cheeks. He was looking at his old pads and skates that Eddie Dufour [the Canadiens trainer] had arranged in Georges' corner. Then, he asked one little favour—the sweater he had worn in the last world series." It was by then that he had lost 35 pounds. Vézina, who had been plagued by monetary issues due to bad business investments in his final weeks, returned to his hometown of Chicoutimi with his wife Marie, where he would be admitted to the l'Hôtel-Dieu hospital; he died there in the early hours on March 27, 1926. Though he played only one period for the Canadiens during the entire season, the team honoured his entire $6,000 salary, a testament to how important Vézina had been to the team. The Canadiens finished in last place in 1925–26.

== Legacy ==
"Vézina was a pale, narrow-featured fellow, almost frail-looking, yet remarkably good with his stick. He'd pick off more shots with it than he did with his glove. He stood upright in the net and scarcely ever left his feet; he simply played all his shots in a standing position. He always wore a toque—a small, knitted hat with no brim in Montreal colours – bleu, blanc et rouge. I also remember him as the coolest man I ever saw, absolutely imperturbable."

— Frank Boucher, player and coach for the New York Rangers

One of the dominant goaltenders in the NHA and early NHL, Vézina led the Canadiens to five Stanley Cup Final appearances, where they won the title twice. Seven times in his career, Vézina had the lowest goals-against average in the league he played, and he had the second-best average another five times. From when he joined the Canadiens in 1910, until being forced to retire in 1925, Vézina never missed a game nor allowed a substitute, playing in 328 consecutive regular season games and an additional 39 playoff games. For the first several years of his career goaltenders could not leave their feet to make a save, and while this rule was changed in 1918 Vézina continued to play in this conservative style throughout his career. Even so, Vézina is regarded as one of the greatest goaltenders in the early days of hockey; the Montreal Standard referred to him as the "greatest goaltender of the last two decades" in their obituary.

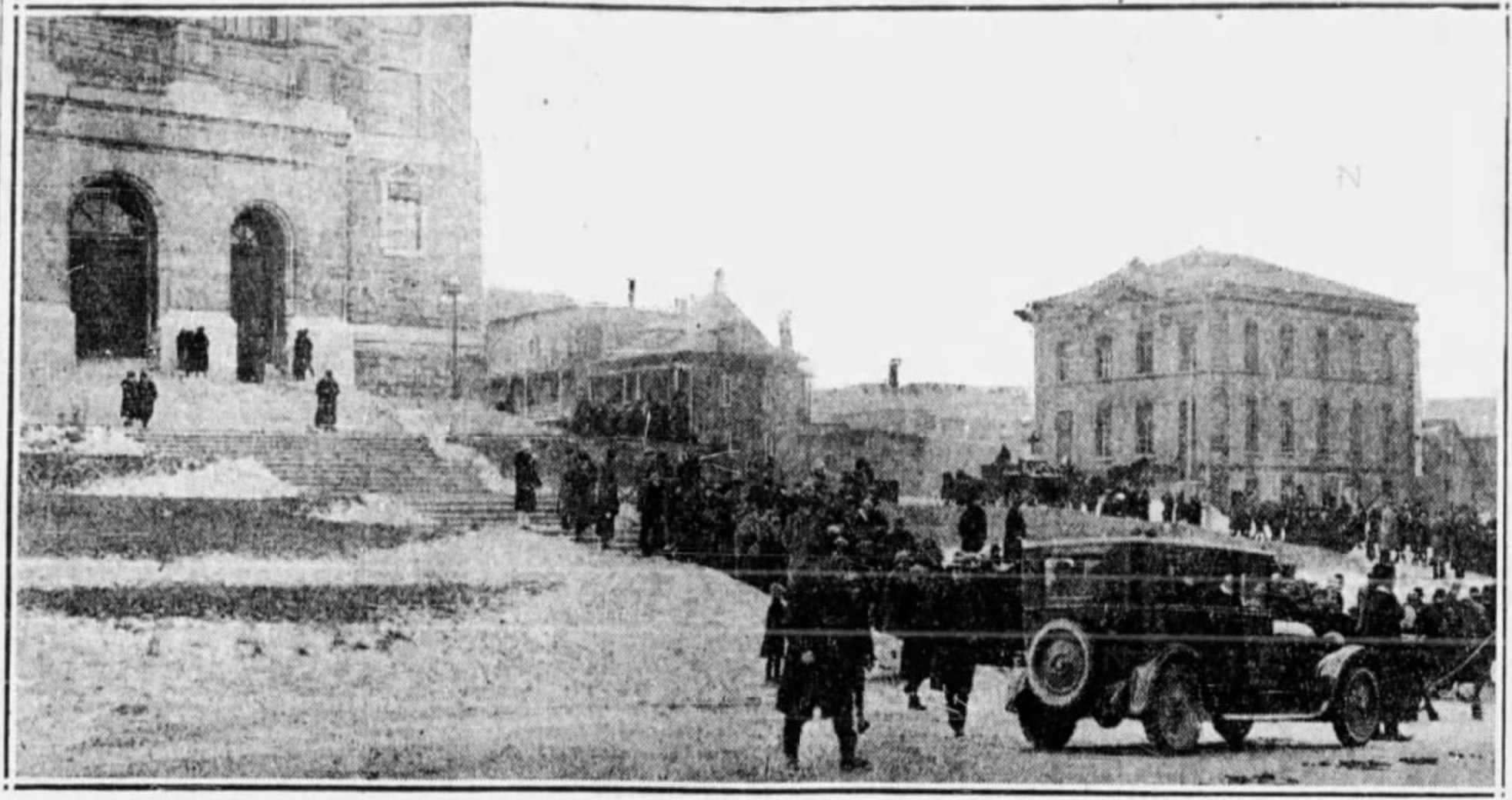
Vézina's funeral procession at the Saint-François-Xavier Cathedral in Chicoutimi in 1926.

Well liked in Montreal, Vézina was often seen as the best player on the ice for the Canadiens, and was respected by his teammates, who considered him the spiritual leader of the team. Referred to as "le Concombre de Chicoutimi" (the "Chicoutimi Cucumber") for his cool demeanour on the ice, he was also known as "l'Habitant silencieux" (the "silent Habitant", Habitant being a nickname for the Canadiens), a reference to his reserved personality. He often sat in a corner of the team's dressing room alone, smoking a pipe and reading the newspaper. When news of Vézina's death was announced, newspapers across Quebec paid tribute to the goalie with articles about his life and career. Hundreds of Catholic masses were held in honour of the devout Vézina, and more than 1,500 people filled the Chicoutimi cathedral for his funeral. He was buried in le Cimetière Saint-Francois Xavier in Chicoutimi.

A lasting legacy of Vézina was the trophy named after him. At the start of the 1926–27 season, Léo Dandurand, Leo Letourneau and Joseph Cattarinich, owners of the Montreal Canadiens, donated the Vezina Trophy to the NHL in honour of Vézina. The first trophy named after an NHL player, it was to be awarded to the goaltender of the team who allowed the fewest goals during the regular season. The inaugural winner of the trophy was Vézina's successor in goal for the Canadiens, George Hainsworth. He went on to win the trophy the next two seasons as well. In 1981, the NHL changed the format of awarding the trophy, instead giving it to the goaltender deemed best in the league based on a poll of NHL general managers. The Hockey Hall of Fame was established in 1945 and among the first nine inductees was Vézina. In 1998 Vézina was ranked number 75 on The Hockey News' list of the 100 Greatest Hockey Players. In honour of the first professional athlete to come from Chicoutimi, the city renamed their hockey arena the Centre Georges-Vézina in 1965. When the NHL announced its 100 greatest players in conjunction with the league's centennial 2017, Vézina was included on the list.

== Career statistics ==
=== Regular season and playoffs ===
			Regular season								Playoffs
Season	Team	League	GP	W	L	T	Min	GA	SO	GAA	GP	W	L	T	Min	GA	SO	GAA
1909–10	Chicoutimi Saguenéens	MCHL	—	—	—	—	—	—	—	—	—	—	—	—	—	—	—	—
1910–11	Montreal Canadiens	NHA	16	8	8	0	980	62	0	3.80	—	—	—	—	—	—	—	—
1911–12	Montreal Canadiens	NHA	18	8	10	0	1109	66	0	3.57	—	—	—	—	—	—	—	—
1912–13	Montreal Canadiens	NHA	20	9	11	0	1217	81	1	3.99	—	—	—	—	—	—	—	—
1913–14	Montreal Canadiens	NHA	20	13	7	0	1222	64	1	3.14	2	1	1	0	120	6	1	3.00
1914–15	Montreal Canadiens	NHA	20	6	14	0	1257	81	0	3.86	—	—	—	—	—	—	—	—
1915–16	Montreal Canadiens	NHA	24	16	7	1	1482	76	0	3.08	5	3	2	0	300	13	0	2.60
1916–17	Montreal Canadiens	NHA	20	10	10	0	1217	80	0	3.94	6	2	4	0	360	29	0	4.83
1917–18	Montreal Canadiens	NHL	21	12	9	0	1282	84	1	3.93	2	1	1	0	120	10	0	5.00
1918–19	Montreal Canadiens	NHL	18	10	8	0	1117	78	1	4.19	10	6	3	1	636	37	1	3.49
1919–20	Montreal Canadiens	NHL	24	13	11	0	1456	113	0	4.66	—	—	—	—	—	—	—	—
1920–21	Montreal Canadiens	NHL	24	13	11	0	1441	99	1	4.12	—	—	—	—	—	—	—	—
1921–22	Montreal Canadiens	NHL	24	12	11	1	1469	94	0	3.84	—	—	—	—	—	—	—	—
1922–23	Montreal Canadiens	NHL	24	13	9	2	1488	61	2	2.46	2	1	1	0	120	3	0	1.50
1923–24	Montreal Canadiens	NHL	24	13	11	0	1459	48	3	1.97	6	6	0	0	360	6	2	1.00
1924–25	Montreal Canadiens	NHL	30	17	11	2	1860	56	5	1.81	6	3	3	0	360	18	1	3.00
1925–26	Montreal Canadiens	NHL	1	0	0	0	20	0	0	0.00	—	—	—	—	—	—	—	—
NHA totals			138	70	67	1	8484	510	2	3.61	13	6	7	0	780	48	1	3.69
NHL totals			190	103	81	5	11592	633	13	3.28	26	17	8	1	1596	74	4	2.78

- Source: NHL.com

== See also ==
- History of the Montreal Canadiens
- List of ice hockey players who died during their playing career
