= Barney Holden =

Canadian ice hockey player (1881–1948)

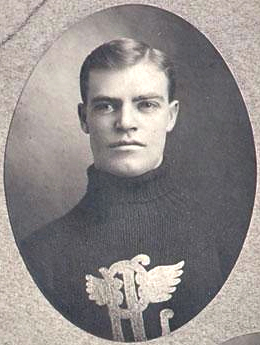
- Holden with the Portage Lakes HC
- Born: March 21, 1881 Winnipeg, Manitoba, Canada
- Died: October 27, 1948 (aged 67) Burnaby, British Columbia, Canada
- Height: 6 ft 0 in (183 cm)
- Weight: 201 lb (91 kg; 14 st 5 lb)
- Position: Defence
- Shot: Right
- Played for: Portage Lakes Hockey Club; Winnipeg Strathconas; Winnipeg Maple Leafs; Montreal Shamrocks; Quebec Bulldogs; Saskatoon Wholesalers
- Playing career: 1904–1912

Bernard "Barney" Holden (March 21, 1881 – October 27, 1948) was a Canadian professional ice hockey defenceman who played 146 games in various professional and amateur leagues, including the National Hockey Association and International Professional Hockey League. Amongst the teams he played with were the Montreal Shamrocks and Quebec Bulldogs.

He was born in Winnipeg, Manitoba.

== Career ==
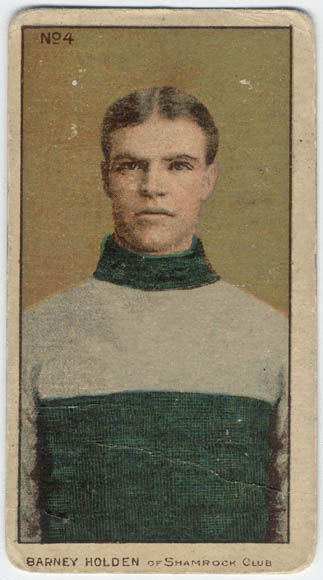
Holden with the Montreal Shamrocks

Barney Holden started out his amateur ice hockey career in his hometown of Winnipeg, playing for the CPR and Shamrocks teams in the local amateur leagues between 1901 and 1903.

In 1904, he became one of the first professional ice hockey players in history, playing with the Portage Lakes Hockey Club in Houghton, Michigan, in the IPHL. He scored the first goal in the first game of the first professional hockey league game on December 9, 1904, in the Pittsburgh Duquesne Garden. Holden won two IPHL championships with the Portage Lakes Hockey Club, in 1905–06 and 1906–07. The 1905–06 team included four future Hockey Hall of Fame members in Riley Hern, Joe Hall, Bruce Stuart and Cyclone Taylor.

In 1907, Holden moved back to Winnipeg to play for the Maple Leafs aggregation, and in March 1908 the team challenged the Montreal Wanderers for the Stanley Cup, losing 8–20 (5–11, 3–9) over two games on March 10 and 12.

For the 1909–1910 season, he moved to Montreal to play for the Montreal Shamrocks in the CHA and the NHA.

During the 1910–11 season, Holden was a member of the Quebec Bulldogs in the NHA, and in 1911–12 he moved to Saskatoon to play for the Wholesalers in the Saskatchewan Professional Hockey League.

== Playing style ==
Holden was a big-sized player for his era, standing at 6 feet and weighing 200 pounds, and while he did not have a reputation as one of the dirtiest players of his era, he could still handle himself physically with a punishing playing style. While Holden was a member of the Winnipeg Maple Leafs, the team played in an infamous qualifying game against the Winnipeg Hockey Club on December 19, 1907, where the Winnipeg Hockey Club players walked off the ice in protest of the Maple Leafs rough-house antics. Holden himself described the contest as the roughest game he was ever in, and his two teammates Harry Smith and Joe Hall were later expelled from the league for their rough-house antics in the game.

== Personal life ==
After his playing career, Holden settled in Vancouver, British Columbia, where he worked for the Rat Portage Lumber Company.

He died in Burnaby, British Columbia and is buried at Mountain View Cemetery in Vancouver.

== Statistics ==
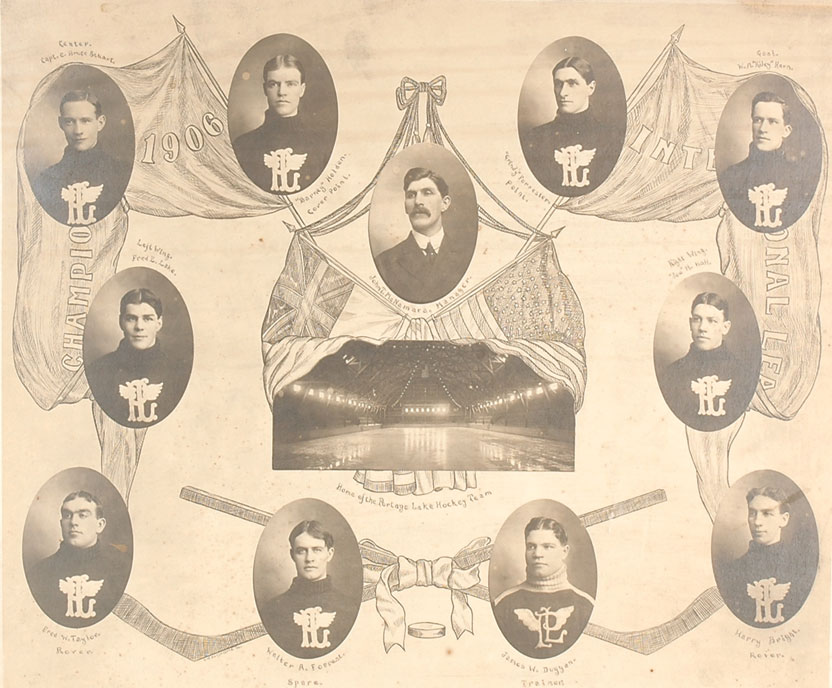
Holden, second from left in the top row, with the 1905–06 Portage Lakes Hockey Club.

| | | | Regular season | | | | | Playoffs |
| Season | Team | League | GP | G | A | Pts | PIM | GP | G | A | Pts | PIM |
|---|---|---|---|---|---|---|---|---|---|---|---|---|
| 1904–05 | Portage Lakes Hockey Club | IPHL | 24 | 9 | 0 | 9 | 47 | – | – | – | – | – |
| 1905–06 | Portage Lakes Hockey Club | IPHL | 20 | 9 | 0 | 9 | 31 | – | – | – | – | – |
| 1906–07 | Portage Lakes Hockey Club | IPHL | 20 | 4 | 3 | 7 | 35 | – | – | – | – | – |
| | Winnipeg Strathconas | MHL | 1 | 1 | 0 | 1 | – | – | – | – | – | – |
| 1907–08 | Winnipeg Maple Leafs | MHL | 15 | 4 | 0 | 4 | – | – | – | – | – | – |
| | | Stanley Cup | – | – | – | – | – | 2 | 0 | 0 | 0 | 2 |
| | | Exh. | 3 | 0 | – | 0 | – | – | – | – | – | – |
| 1908–09 | Winnipeg Maple Leafs | MHL | 9 | 3 | 4 | 7 | 9 | 2 | 1 | 0 | 1 | 0 |
| 1909–10 | Montreal Shamrocks | CHA | 3 | 1 | 0 | 1 | – | – | – | – | – | – |
| 1910 | Montreal Shamrocks | NHA | 12 | 5 | 0 | 5 | 23 | – | – | – | – | – |
| 1910–11 | Quebec Bulldogs | NHA | 16 | 4 | 0 | 4 | 40 | – | – | – | – | – |
| 1911–12 | Saskatoon Wholesalers | SPHL | 7 | 6 | 0 | 6 | – | – | – | – | – | – |
| | | Stanley Cup | – | – | – | – | – | 1 | 0 | 0 | 0 | 12 |
| IPHL totals | | | 64 | 22 | 3 | 25 | 113 | – | – | – | – | – |
| NHA totals | | | 28 | 9 | 0 | 9 | 63 | – | – | – | – | – |
| Stanley Cup totals | | | – | – | – | – | – | 3 | 0 | 0 | 0 | 14 |
