= Lorne Campbell (ice hockey) =

Canadian ice hockey player

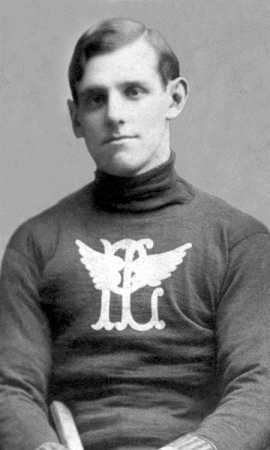
- Lorne Campbell with the Portage Lakes Hockey Club.
- Born: October 8, 1879 Montreal, Quebec, Canada
- Died: May 6, 1957 (aged 77) Coraopolis, Pennsylvania, United States
- Position: Centre
- Shot: Left
- Played for: Montreal Young Crystals; Montreal Hockey Club; Pittsburgh Bankers; Pittsburgh Professionals; Portage Lakes Hockey Club; Calumet Miners; Winnipeg Maple Leafs; Winnipeg Strathconas; Pittsburgh Athletic Club; Cobalt Silver Kings
- Playing career: 1900–1909

Lorne Douglas Campbell (October 8, 1879 – May 6, 1957) was a Canadian professional ice hockey player from Montreal who played over 140 games in various professional leagues, including the Western Pennsylvania Hockey League (WPHL) and International Professional Hockey League (IPHL).

== Playing career ==
Lorne Campbell, a centre forward position wise, first played senior hockey for the Montreal Hockey Club in his hometown of Montreal. He played for the organization's second team before joining the main squad for the 1900–01 season. He then turned professional in the Western Pennsylvania Hockey League (WPHL) with the Pittsburgh Bankers in the 1901–02 season. He played three seasons with the Bankers before joining the Pittsburgh Pros team in the IPHL, which was a merged team of the best WPHL players.

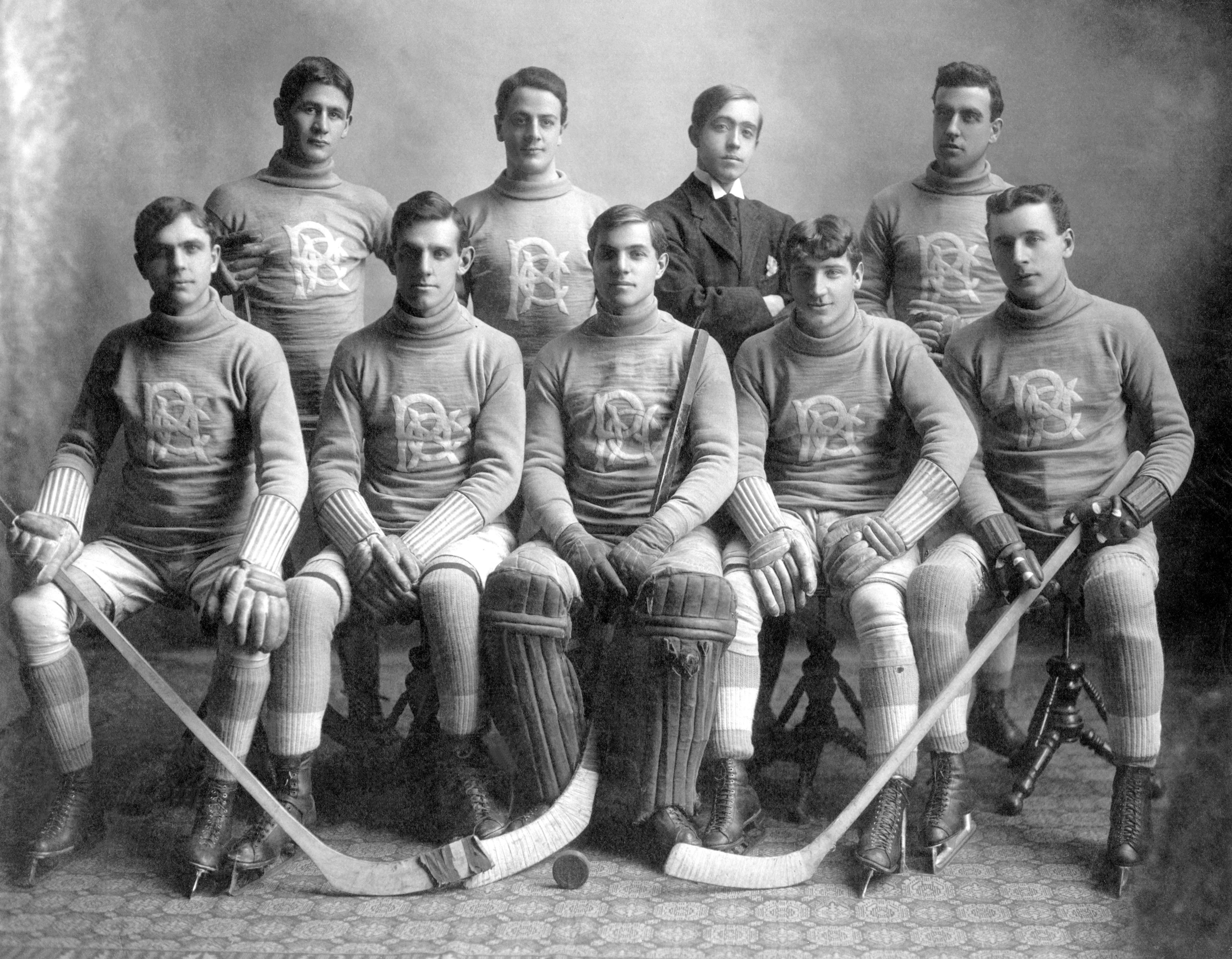
Campbell, sitting second from left, with the 1906–07 Pittsburgh Pros

Campbell played three seasons in the IPHL, also spending short stints with the Portage Lakes Hockey Club and the Calumet Miners. Campbell was one of the most prominent goal scorers in the IPHL's short history, ending up with both most goals and most games played at the conclusion of the league in 1907.

For the 1907–08 season, Campbell returned to Canada to play for the Winnipeg Maple Leafs of the Manitoba Professional Hockey League (MPHL). That season he played for Winnipeg in its unsuccessful Stanley Cup challenge. He played one season with the Pittsburgh Athletic Club of the WPHL, and also one game with the Winnipeg Strathconas of the MPHL, before finishing his career with one season in the National Hockey Association (NHA) with Cobalt in 1910. In 1915–16, Campbell played on the Pittsburgh Winter Garden hockey team, an amateur team based in Pittsburgh.

== Playing style ==
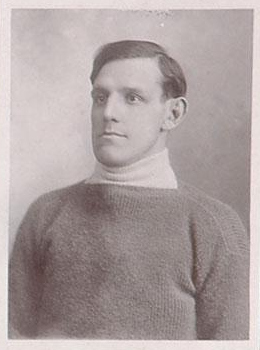
Campbell with the Winnipeg Maple Leafs

The Toronto Star, prior to the 1908 Stanley Cup challenge with the Winnipeg Maple Leafs against the Montreal Wanderers, described Campbell as a "fine skater and stick-handle[r]" and a "glutton for punishment", and noted that his strong point was the manner in which he rushed the puck right in on the nets. The newspaper claimed that he seldom shot from long distance but instead was a wonder in getting through the opponent defence.

An example of Campbell taking serious punishment from opposing defence occurred in a December 1905 game between the Pittsburgh Pros and Michigan Soo Indians, in the IPHL, where Michigan Soo player Eddie Howell knocked him down in the second half of the contest with an elbow check and then clubbed him over the head with his stick. Blood was streaming down from an ugly gash below Campbell's right eye, and after the game it was believed he was suffering from a case of concussion of the brain.

An article in the Pittsburgh Press from March 9, 1907, chronicling Campbell's career in hockey up until then, claimed that while he was not considered as big of a "star" as deserting Pittsburgh players Hod Stuart and Billy Baird, he was considered a more reliable and uniformly good player by the newspaper, and it also noted that he could always be depended on to bring his game, which could not be said of either Stuart or Baird.

=== Career statistics ===
Season	Team	League	Regular season					Playoffs				
Season	Team	League	GP	G	A	Pts	PIM	GP	G	A	Pts	PIM
1899–1900	Montreal-2	CAHL-I	1	0	0	0	–	2	1	0	1	–
1900–1901	Montreal-2	CAHL-I	1	2	0	2	–	–	–	–	–	–
1900–1901	Montreal AAA	CAHL	7	10	0	10	–	–	–	–	–	–
1901–02	Pittsburgh Bankers	WPHL	13	6	6	12	19	–	–	–	–	–
1901–02	Pittsburgh Bankers	X-Games	5	6	3	9	6	–	–	–	–	–
1902–03	Pittsburgh Bankers	WPHL	14	14	8	22	22	4	4	1	5	4
1903–04	Pittsburgh Bankers	WPHL	15	21	8	29	25	2	5	2	7	0
1904–05	Pittsburgh Professionals	IPHL	24	29	0	29	9	–	–	–	–	–
	Portage Lakes HC	IPHL	4	6	0	6	0	–	–	–	–	–
1905–06	Pittsburgh Professionals	IPHL	24	35	0	35	28	–	–	–	–	–
	Calumet Miners	IPHL	1	3	0	3	1	–	–	–	–	–
1906–07	Pittsburgh Professionals	IPHL	24	35	25	60	40	–	–	–	–	–
1907–08	Winnipeg Maple Leafs	MPHL	15	29	0	29	–	–	–	–	–	–
		Stanley Cup	–	–	–	–	–	2	0	0	0	25
		Exh.	3	2	–	2	–	–	–	–	–	–
1908–09	Winnipeg Strathconas	MPHL	1	0	0	0	0	–	–	–	–	–
1908–09	Pittsburgh Athletic Club	WPHL	14	11	0	11	–	–	–	–	–	–
1910	Cobalt Silver Kings	NHA	2	4	0	4	8	–	–	–	–	–
WPHL totals			56	52	22	74	76	6	9	3	12	4
IPHL totals			77	108	25	133	78	–	–	–	–	–

Source: Total Hockey, eliteprospects.com and sihrhockey.org

=== Awards & records ===
- 1903, 1904 – WPHL First All-Star team
- 1906 – IPHL Second All-Star team
- 1907 – IPHL First All-Star team

Source: Total Hockey
