= Hod Stuart =

Canadian ice hockey player (1879–1907)

- Hockey Hall of Fame, 1945
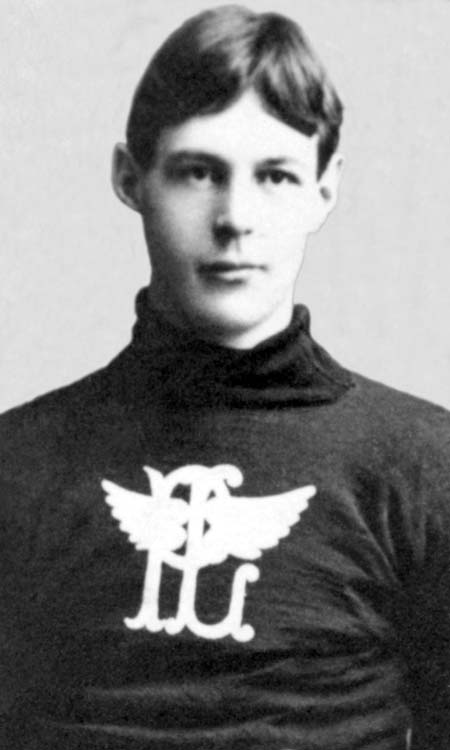
- Born: February 20, 1879 Ottawa, Ontario, Canada
- Died: June 23, 1907 (aged 28) Bay of Quinte, Ontario, Canada
- Height: 6 ft 2 in (188 cm)
- Weight: 190 lb (86 kg; 13 st 8 lb)
- Position: Defence/Cover-point
- Played for: Montreal Wanderers; Pittsburgh Professionals; Calumet Miners; Portage Lakes Hockey Club; Pittsburgh Bankers; Quebec Bulldogs; Ottawa Hockey Club
- Playing career: 1899–1907

William Hodgson "Hod" Stuart (February 20, 1879 – June 23, 1907) was a Canadian professional ice hockey player. A cover-point (now known as a defenceman), he played nine seasons for several teams in different leagues from 1899 to 1907. He also played briefly for the Ottawa Rough Riders team in Canadian football. With his brother Bruce, Stuart played in the first professional ice hockey league, the American-based International Professional Hockey League (IPHL), where he was regarded as one of the best players in the league.

Frustrated with the violence associated with the IPHL, he left the league late in 1906 and returned to Canada, where in 1907 he helped the Montreal Wanderers win the Stanley Cup, the championship trophy for hockey. Two months later, he died in a diving accident. To raise money for his widow and children, the Eastern Canada Amateur Hockey Association hosted an all-star game, the first of its kind to be played in any sport. An estimated 3,800 spectators attended the Hod Stuart Memorial Game on January 2, 1908, described by the Montreal Herald as "unique in the history of hockey in Montreal, if not in the whole of Canada".

In an era when defencemen were expected to stay behind during the play, Stuart became known for his ability to score goals while playing a defensive role, and for his ability to remain calm during matches that often turned violent. He also became known for his work to reduce that violence and to increase the salaries of hockey players. His efforts were acknowledged when the Hockey Hall of Fame was created in 1945 and he became one of the first nine players to be inducted. He was joined there by his brother Bruce in 1961.

== Personal life ==
Stuart was born in Ottawa, Ontario, the eldest son of William Stuart and Rachel Hodgson. He had two brothers, Alex and Bruce, and two sisters, Jessie and Lottio. Stuart was involved in sports from an early age. His father had been a good lacrosse player and a good curler and was at one point skip of the Ottawa Curling Club, and both Hod and Bruce played hockey from a young age, often for the same teams. Stuart also played rugby and football, and played for the local professional football team, the Ottawa Rough Riders.

Outside of hockey Stuart worked as a bricklayer, and later in his life he also worked with his father in construction. He was said to have been a quiet person, and unlike other athletes of his era was not one to talk about his exploits, except with close friends. Loughlin, his wife, came from Quebec; around 1903 they were married and had two children together.

== Playing career ==
Stuart first joined a senior hockey team when he spent the winter of 1895–1896 with the Rat Portage Thistles, a team in northwestern Ontario. Along with his brother Bruce, Stuart joined the Ottawa Hockey Club of the Canadian Amateur Hockey League (CAHL) for the 1899 season. He played the 1900 season for Ottawa, captaining the team. Through his father's business contacts, Stuart got a job in Quebec and moved there in 1900; upon arriving there he joined the Quebec Bulldogs, also of the CAHL. He scored seven goals in fifteen games with the team over the next two seasons.

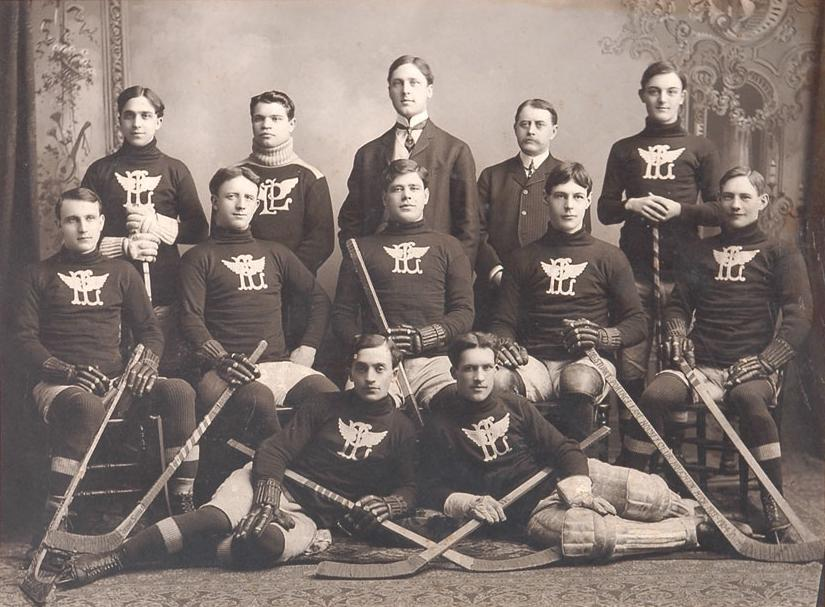
The Portage Lakes Hockey Club in 1904. Stuart is in the middle row, second from right.

In 1902, the Pittsburgh Bankers of the Western Pennsylvania Hockey League signed Stuart to a professional contract; this was disputed between the Bankers and the Pittsburgh Victorias, who also claimed him. Eventually the Bankers won the dispute and kept Stuart; the following year they would also sign Bruce. Stuart was offered a salary of US$15–20 per week, plus steady income from a day job in Pittsburgh. Stuart scored seven goals and had eight assists and was named the best cover-point in the league in 1903.

After one season in Pittsburgh, Stuart moved to the Portage Lakes Hockey Club, a team in northern Michigan, for the 1903–1904 season and played in fourteen exhibition games, finishing fourth on the team with thirteen goals scored. With the formation of the International Professional Hockey League, Stuart left Portage Lake for the Calumet Miners, where he accepted the positions of coach and manager, in addition to playing cover-point, for $1,800. He scored eighteen goals for Calumet in 1904–1905, helped the team with the league championship and was named to the end of season all-star team as the best cover-point in the league.

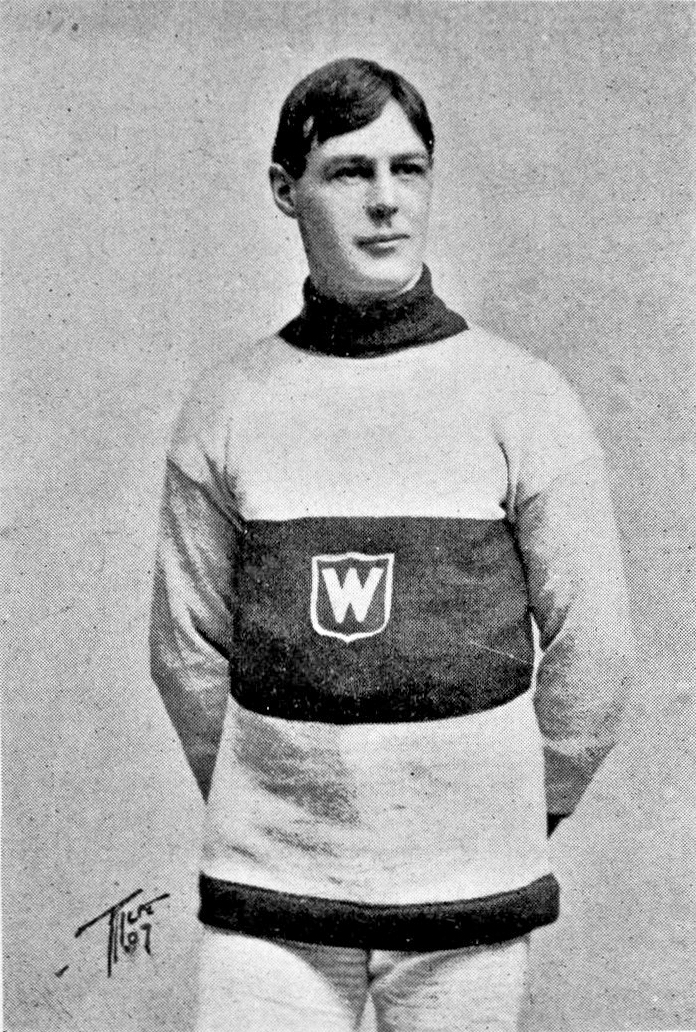
Stuart with the Montreal Wanderers

On December 11, 1905, before the start of the 1905–06 season, Stuart was suspended from the league after the western teams complained that he had won too many championships and was too rough for the league. He was reinstated by the league on December 30, and joined the Pittsburgh Professionals. After Pittsburgh finished their season, Stuart joined Calumet for one game so they could try to win the league championship, which they lost to the Portage Lakes Hockey Club. Once again he was named best cover-point in the IPHL as he scored eleven goals. A big man with a fluid skating stride, he was considered the finest defenceman of his era for his outstanding play on both offence and defence.

As the IPHL convinced players to move to the United States and get paid to play, hockey teams in Canada were forced to match the salaries in order to keep their players. Stuart, who was unhappy playing in Pittsburgh because of the violence involved in games, heard from Dickie Boon that the Montreal Wanderers, defending Stanley Cup winners, of the Eastern Canada Amateur Hockey Association (ECAHA) were willing to make Stuart the highest paid player in hockey if he were to join the team. On December 13, 1906, Stuart had a letter published in the Montreal Star that detailed his problems with the IPHL. Stuart's chief concern was the officiating; he said they "don't know how to run hockey over here, the rink people appoint the most dumb and incompetent referees that could be found." In December 1906 Pittsburgh refused to play a game against Michigan Soo, claiming they did not like the choice of referee. While a common problem in the IPHL, Pittsburgh's management believed Stuart was behind the action, and released him from the team. No longer bound to any team, Stuart joined the Wanderers; his first game with the team was watched by 6,069 fans, one of the largest audiences to see a hockey game in Canada to that point. He took part in the Wanderers' Stanley Cup challenge against the New Glasgow Cubs, a team from Nova Scotia, on December 27 and 29, 1906, and along with teammates Riley Hern, Frank Glass, Moose Johnson and Jack Marshall, became the first professional hockey players to compete for the Stanley Cup.

"They could not offer me money enough here to go through what I went through last year in this league. Everybody had a slur at me and I could not lift my stick off the ice. That is a fact. I never took my stick off the ice, except in shooting, all winter, and never checked a man with the stick."

— Excerpt from letter written by Stuart to the Montreal Star on December 13, 1906 detailing his issues with the IPHL.

Stuart did not escape violence in the ECAHA. On January 12, 1907, the Wanderers faced the Ottawa Senators, a game the Wanderers ultimately won 4–2. Charles Spittal of Ottawa was described as "attempting to split Cecil Blachford's skull", Alf Smith hit Stuart "across the temple with his stick, laying him out like a corpse", and Harry Smith cracked his stick across Ernie "Moose" Johnson's face, breaking Johnson's nose. Stuart was commended for his actions during the game; it was said that he neither flinched nor retaliated, even after bearing most of the hits. At a league meeting on January 18, the Montreal Victorias proposed suspending Spittal and Alf Smith for the season in response to their actions, but this was voted down and the president of the league, Fred McRobie, resigned. The next time the Senators visited Montreal for a game, the police arrested Spittal, Alf and Harry Smith, leading to $20 fines for Spittal and Alf, and an acquittal for Harry. Even with the persistent violence, Stuart helped the Wanderers to an undefeated season; they then accepted a challenge from the Kenora Thistles for the Stanley Cup. The Thistles won the series, held in January, but lost a rematch between the teams in March, giving the Cup back to the Wanderers. Stuart participated in both challenges, and though did not score a goal in any of the four games, he was said to have played the best game of his career in the first game of the series, even with a broken finger. Regarded as the most important player on the Wanderers, Stuart was said to know how to play every position on the ice, and passed his knowledge of the game onto his teammates.

== Death ==
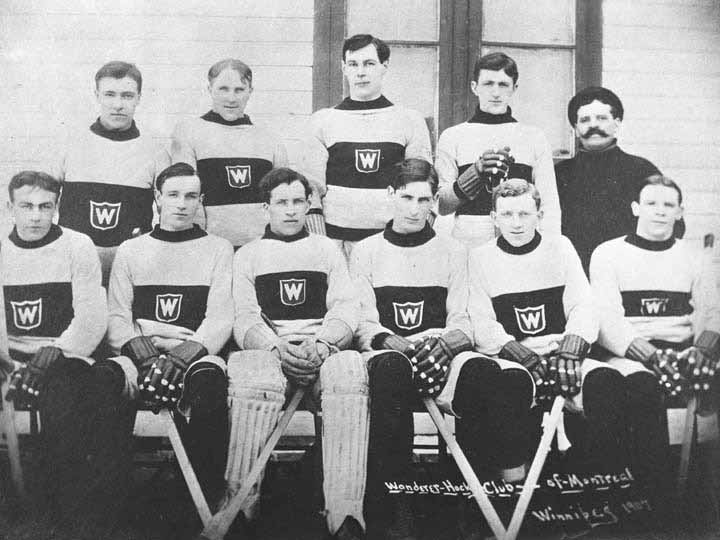
The Montreal Wanderers during the Stanley Cup challenge in 1907, in which the team would defeat the Kenora Thistles. Stuart is in the back row, third from left.

Tired of the constant violence, Stuart quit hockey after the Stanley Cup championship in 1907 and joined his father in construction. As part of this job, Stuart was sent to Belleville, Ontario, to oversee the building of the Belleville Drill Shed, one of his father's contracts. While in Belleville, he continued to receive offers to join a new hockey team. He was asked if he wanted to manage the Belleville team; a similar offer came from Peterborough, Ontario, while a town outside Toronto was said to have offered a railroad president's salary if Stuart would join them. On the afternoon of June 23, 1907, Stuart went to the Bay of Quinte, near Belleville, to swim with some friends. Stuart swam to the nearby lighthouse, about half a kilometre away from his group, climbed onto a platform and dove into the shallow water. He dived head first onto jagged rocks, gashing his head and breaking his neck. He was killed instantly. His body was brought back to Ottawa, where a service was held at his family's home before he was buried at Beechwood Cemetery.

=== All-star game ===
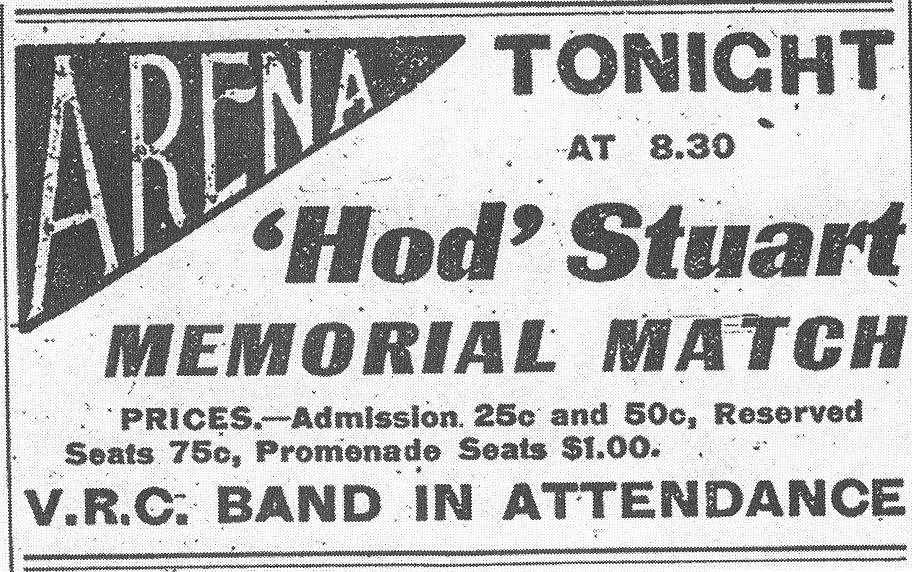
Newspaper advertisement for the memorial all-star game held to benefit Stuart's family, January 2, 1908

To raise money for Stuart's widow and two children, the ECAHA decided to host an all-star game, the first of its kind to be played in any sport. An estimated 3,800 spectators attended the Hod Stuart Memorial Game on January 2, 1908, with tickets selling out days in advance. Described by the Montreal Herald as "unique in the history of hockey in Montreal, if not in the whole of Canada," the event featured the Montreal Wanderers, Stuart's former team, playing against a squad of top players from the other teams in the ECAHA.

The Westmount Arena agreed to host the event for no charge, and all proceeds from the game went to Stuart's family, totaling over $2,100. Fans were asked to mail in choices of who should play on the all-star team, with the contest winners given two tickets to the game. The Wanderers, an established team, played better than the All-Stars, who had to learn to play together, and led 7–1 after the first half of the game; though the All-Stars played better in the second half, the Wanderers won by a score of 10–7.

=== Roster ===
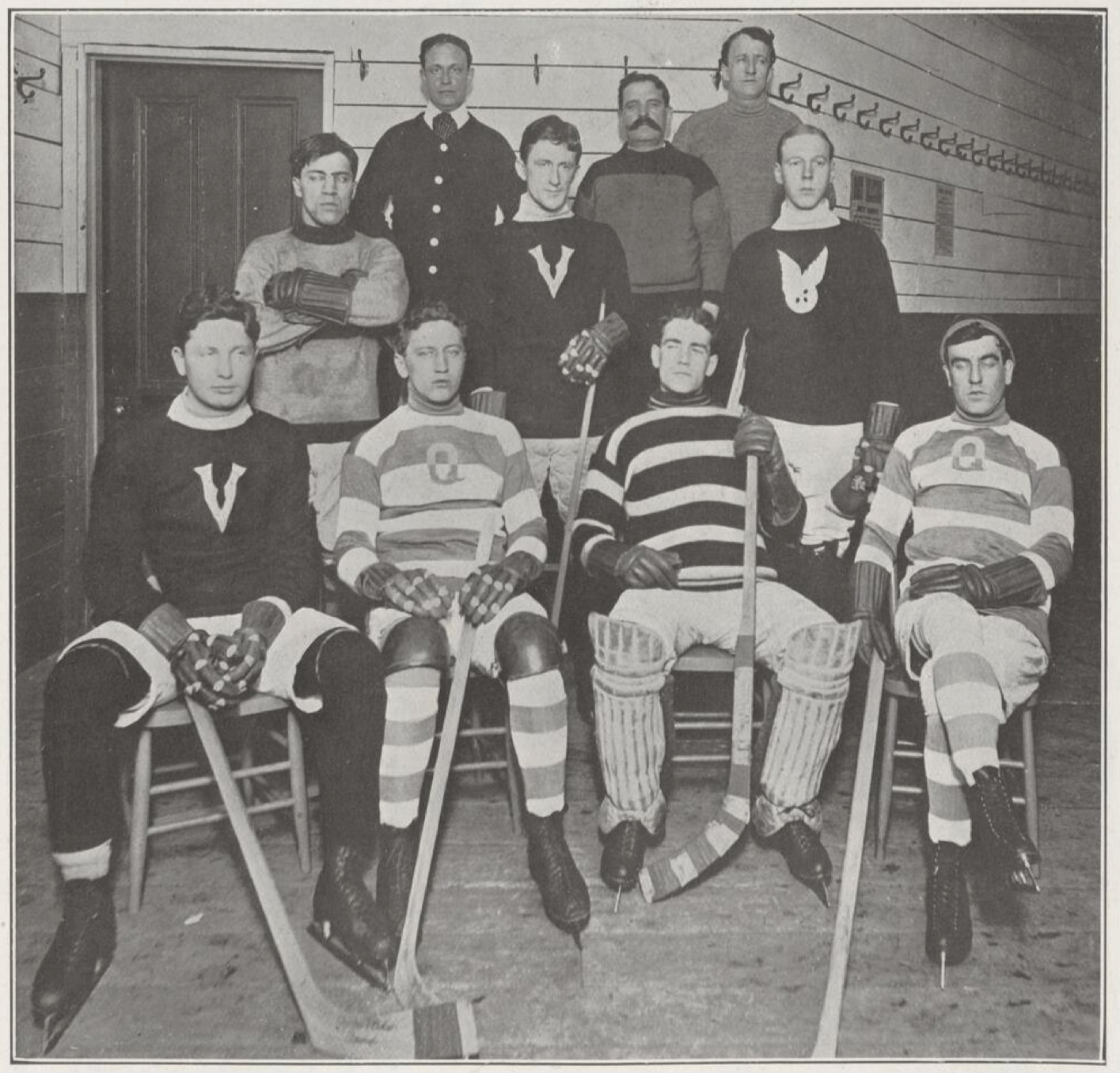
ECAHA All-Stars

Wanderers (10)	Position	All-Stars (7)
Riley Hern	Goaltender	Percy LeSueur (Ottawa)
Art Ross	Point	Rod Kennedy (Victorias)
Walter Smaill	Cover-point	Frank Patrick (Victorias)
Frank Glass	Rover	Joe Power (Quebec)
Ernie Russell	Centre	Grover Sargent (Montreal)
Cecil Blachford	Right Wing	Ed Hogan (Quebec)
Ernie Johnson	Left Wing	Jack Marshall (Shamrocks)

=== Legacy and playing style ===
In the immediate aftermath of his death on June 23, 1907, and surrounding his funeral in Ottawa on June 24, many of Stuart's close colleagues in the tight-knit hockey community would pay tribute to the late sportsman. Representatives from the Ottawa Hockey Club, Ottawa Rowing Club, Ottawa Football Club, St. Patrick's Football Club, Ottawa Victorias and Montreal Wanderers were all present at the funeral services alongside family, friends and several city aldermen, all expressing regret for the passing of one of the city's most distinguished athletes. James Strachan, president of the Montreal Wanderers, called him "a splendid hockey player, and one of the finest fellows in the game," and his brother Billy Strachan, a teammate of Stuart on the 1906–07 Montreal Wanderers, said that "the little I did play in his company gave me a very high opinion of him as a player and as a man."

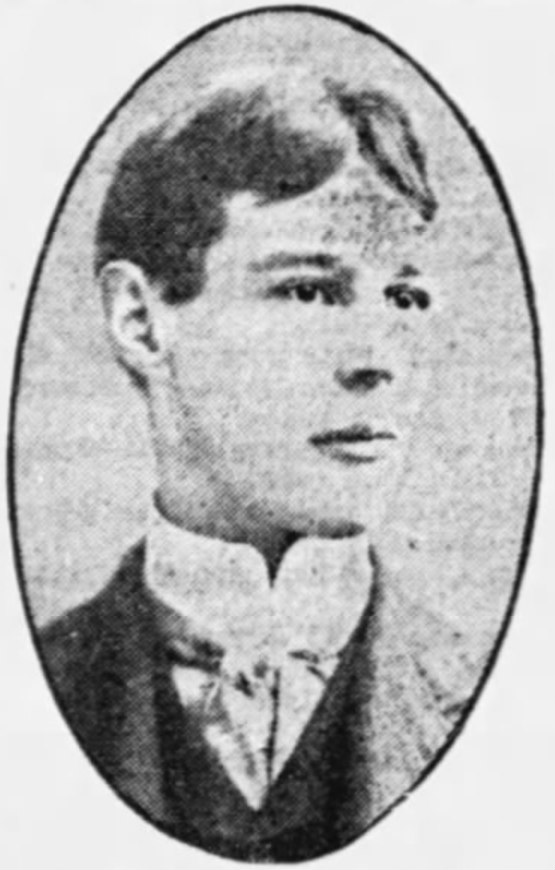
Hod Stuart

"As far as the position of cover point is concerned, I don't think anyone has ever shown the same qualities in this position as the late Hod Stuart. In comparing the famous hockey players who have won renown, both past and present, at cover point, I feel firmly convinced the late lamented Hod stood head and shoulders above the entire list. Those that I have not played with or against in the past decade, I have seen in action, and out of the number I would not choose one whom I think equals the big fellow, who used to glide along with unerring purpose."

— Lorne Campbell on Hod Stuart.

Around the time of his death Hod Stuart was often in the conversation not only as one of the best cover-points in the game, but also one of the best players overall. Montreal native forward Lorne Campbell, who had been a teammate of Stuart on both the Pittsburgh Bankers (WPHL) and the Pittsburgh Professionals (IPHL), claimed in a 1908 interview with the Winnipeg Tribune that Stuart was the best cover-point the game had ever seen up to that point in time, and that he had also helped revolutionize the game of the puck rushing defenceman.

Lorne Campbell would also remark that despite Stuart looking slow on the ice to some spectators, this was only due to his peculiar skating stroke that would give away a false impression, and that for a player of his big size Stuart was "the speediest that ever drew on a pair of skates to play hockey." Campbell also complimented Stuart on his stickhandling and his long reach, and claimed him to have been "one of the best generals in the game."

"He was not of the old class of cover-points, who considered their part of the play merely to check their man or secure the puck and shoot it to the other end of the rink. This was not Hod's style by any means, as his strongest playing was to get the rubber and take it down to the opponents' nets, and generally he succeeded as he was the most difficult man on the ice to stop."

— Lorne Campbell on Hod Stuart.

Lorne Campbell further claimed that while Stuart had been involved in many violent hockey games as a player, he was not himself a dirty player, "but more sinned against than sinning." Campbell claimed that Stuart "was able to take care of himself on the ice, and those stories about him going into a game with the only thought of laying some player out were pure fiction." According to Campbell Stuart took so many stick whacks across his hands, particularly between the thumb and the first fingers, that he had to devise a special hockey glove so padded with protection that a crack on that part of the hand had no effect on him.

== Career statistics ==
=== Regular season and playoffs ===
			Regular season					Playoffs
Season	Team	League	GP	G	A	Pts	PIM	GP	G	A	Pts	PIM
1898–99	Ottawa Hockey Club	CAHL	3	1	0	1	—	—	—	—	—	—
1899–1900	Ottawa Hockey Club	CAHL	7	5	0	5	—	—	—	—	—	—
1900–01	Quebec Bulldogs	CAHL	7	2	0	2	—	—	—	—	—	—
1901–02	Quebec Bulldogs	CAHL	8	5	0	5	—	—	—	—	—	—
1902–03	Pittsburgh Bankers	WPHL	13	7	8	15	29	4	1	2	3	2
1903–04	Portage Lakes Hockey Club	Exhib	14	13	0	13	23	9	4	0	4	12
1904–05	Calumet Miners	IPHL	22	18	0	18	19	—	—	—	—	—
1905–06	Pittsburgh Professionals	IPHL	20	11	0	11	50	—	—	—	—	—
1905–06	Calumet Miners	IPHL	1	0	0	0	0	—	—	—	—	—
1906–07	Pittsburgh Professionals	IPHL	4	1	3	4	19	—	—	—	—	—
1906–07	Montreal Wanderers	ECAHA	8	3	0	3	21	—	—	—	—	—
1906–07	Montreal Wanderers	St-Cup	—	—	—	—	—	4	0	0	0	8
CAHL totals			25	13	0	13	—	—	—	—	—	—
WPHL totals			13	7	8	15	29	4	1	2	3	2
IPHL totals			47	30	3	33	88	—	—	—	—	—
ECAHA totals			8	3	0	3	21	—	—	—	—	—

Playing stats from Total Hockey

== Awards ==
=== WPHL ===
Award	Year(s)
First All-Star Team	1903

=== IPHL ===
Award	Year(s)
First All-Star Team	1905, 1906

Awards from Total Hockey

== See also ==
- List of ice hockey players who died during their playing career

== Bibliography ==
- "Bruce Stuart, Former Hockey Great, Dies", Ottawa Citizen, Ottawa, Ontario, October 30, 1961
- Coleman, Charles (1966), Trail of the Stanley Cup, Vol I., Toronto, Ontario: Kendall/Hunt, ISBN 0-8403-2941-5
- Diamond, Dan, ed. (2003), Total Hockey: The Official Encyclopedia of the National Hockey League, Second Edition, New York City, New York: Total Sports Publishing, ISBN 1-894963-16-4
- "After the Puck", The Globe, Toronto, Ontario, December 25, 1899
- Feige, Timothy (2011), Hockey's Greatest Tragedies: The Broken Heroes of the Fastest Game on Earth, London, United Kingdom: Arcturus Publishing, ISBN 978-1-84837-742-4
- Fitsell, J.W (1987), Hockey's Captains, Colonels & Kings, Erin, Ontario: The Boston Mills Press, ISBN 0-919-783-68-6
- Goyens, Chrys; Orr, Frank (2000), Blades on Ice: A century of professional hockey, Markham, Ontario: Team Power Enterprises, ISBN 0-9686220-0-3
- Hod Stuart Page, Hockey Hall of Fame
- "Hod Stuart Killed", The Gazette, Montreal, Quebec, July 24, 1907
- "Laid at Rest: Tributes of Sorrow at Funeral of the Late Hod Stuart", Ottawa Citizen, Ottawa, Ontario, June 25, 1907
- McKinley, Michael (2009), Hockey: A People's History, Toronto, Ontario: McClelland & Stewart, ISBN 978-0-771057-71-7
- McKinley, Michael (2000), Putting a Roof on Winter: Hockey's Rise from Sport to Spectacle, Vancouver, British Columbia: Greystone Books, ISBN 1-55054-798-4
- "Icy Inklings", Pittsburgh Press, December 19, 1902
- "Icy Inklings", Pittsburgh Press, December 30, 1905
- "Icy Inklings", Pittsburgh Press, February 10, 1906
- "Last Big Game at the Garden", Pittsburgh Press, March 3, 1906
- Podnieks, Andrew (2003), Honoured Members, Bolton, Ontario: Fenn Publishing, ISBN 1-55168-239-7
- Podnieks, Andrew (2000), The NHL All-Star Game: Fifty Years of the Great Tradition, Toronto, Ontario: HarperCollins, ISBN 0-00-200058-X
- "Rival Hockey Teams Meet for Second Time", Pittsburgh Press, December 19, 1902
- "Scores the Officials", Pittsburgh Press, December 18, 1906
- Sproule, William J. (2019), Houghton: The Birthplace of Professional Hockey, Calumet, Michigan: Copper Island Printing, ISBN 978-1-7330823-0-3
- Vigneault, Michel (2000), Hod Stuart Page, Dictionary of Canadian Biography
- "Wanderers Win", The Gazette, Montreal, Quebec, March 25, 1907
- Weir, Glenn; Chapman, Jeff; Weir, Travis (1999), Ultimate Hockey, Toronto, Ontario: Stoddart Publishing, ISBN 0-7737-6057-1
- "Western Hockey Clubs After Ottawa's Famous Defence Man", Ottawa Citizen, June 20, 1907
- Whitehead, Eric (1980), The Patricks: Hockey's Royal Family, New York City, New York: Doubleday, ISBN 0-385-15662-6

Preceded by Harvey Pulford	Ottawa Senators captain (Original Era); 1899–1900	Succeeded by Harvey Pulford
