= Grindy Forrester =

Canadian ice hockey player

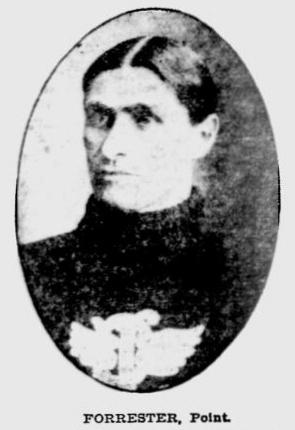
- Grindy Forrester with the Portage Lakes Hockey Club.
- Born: July 11, 1877; Barrie, Ontario, Canada
- Died: November 8, 1932 (aged 55); Miles City, Montana, USA
- Height: 5 ft 10 in (178 cm)
- Weight: 190 lb (86 kg; 13 st 8 lb)
- Position: Cover Point
- Played for: Barrie Hockey Club; Thessalon HC; Portages Lakes HC; Pittsburgh Athletic Club; Winnipeg Maple Leafs; Montreal Shamrocks
- Playing career: 1897–1909

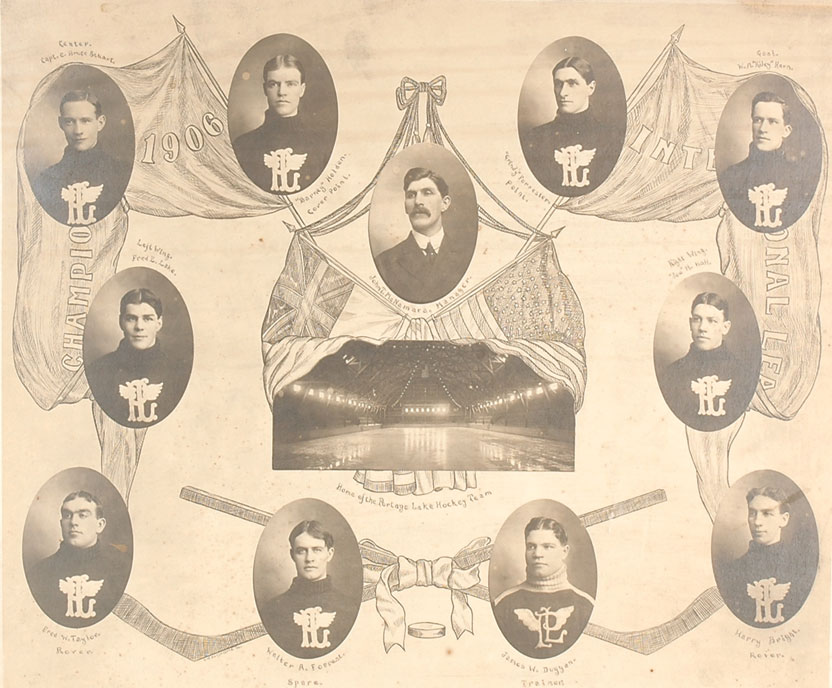
Forrester, second from right in the top row, with the Portage Lakes Hockey Club in the 1905–06 season.

Joseph Andrew "Grindy" Forrester (July 11, 1877 – November 8, 1932) was a Canadian professional ice hockey player from Barrie, Ontario. He played with the Montreal Shamrocks of the Canadian Hockey Association and the National Hockey Association in 1909–1910. He also played with the Portage Lakes Hockey Club in the IPHL, the Winnipeg Maple Leafs in the MPHL and the Pittsburgh Athletic Club in the WPHL.

Between 1897 and 1902, Forrester played amateur hockey in Waterloo, Ontario.

== Playing style ==
According to former ice hockey player and coach Jack Adams, Grindy Forrester had one of the hardest shots during his era. When Forrester was about to take the step from amateur to professional hockey prior to the 1905–06 season, leaving Thessalon in Ontario for the Canadian-American IPHL circuit, a newspaper account in the Toronto Star noted him as being a "natural-born hockey player", claiming that "his great wrist-shooting made him the terror of all goal-keepers in the O.H.A.". The paper also pointed out that he was "big, fast, and shifty, and well able to take care of himself."

== Statistics ==
			Regular season					Playoffs
Season	Team	League	GP	G	A	Pts	PIM	GP	G	A	Pts	PIM
1903–04	Barrie Hockey Club	OHA	4	4	0	4	3	–	–	–	–	–
1904–05	Thessalon HC	OHA-I	–	–	–	–	–	–	–	–	–	–
1905–06	Portage Lakes Hockey Club	IPHL	20	4	0	4	16	–	–	–	–	–
1906–07	Portage Lakes Hockey Club	IPHL	22	15	3	18	14	–	–	–	–	–
1907–08	Pittsburgh Athletic Club	WPHL	4	1	0	1	–	–	–	–	–	–
1907–08	Winnipeg Maple Leafs	MPHL	11	2	1	3	9	–	–	–	–	–
1908	Winnipeg Maple Leafs	Stanley Cup	–	–	–	–	–	2	0	0	0	3
1908–09	Winnipeg Maple Leafs	MPHL	8	7	4	11	6	–	–	–	–	–
1909–10	Montreal Shamrocks	CHA	1	1	0	1	0	–	–	–	–	–
1910	Montreal Shamrocks	NHA	8	0	0	0	0	–	–	–	–	–
IPHL totals			42	19	3	22	30	–	–	–	–	–
WPHL totals			19	9	5	14	15	–	–	–	–	–

Statistics per Society for International Hockey Research at sihrhockey.org
