= Bruce Stuart =

Canadian ice hockey player (1881–1961)

- Hockey Hall of Fame, 1961
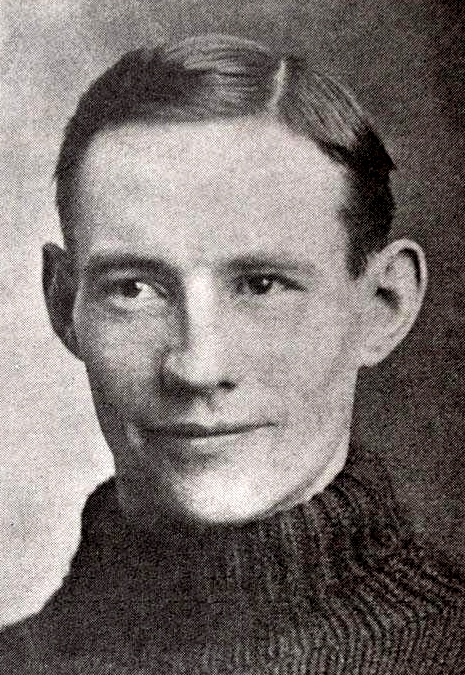
- Bruce Stuart with the Portage Lakes Hockey Club in the 1905–06 season.
- Born: November 30, 1881 Ottawa, Ontario, Canada
- Died: October 28, 1961 (aged 79) Ottawa, Ontario, Canada
- Height: 6 ft 0 in (183 cm)
- Weight: 180 lb (82 kg; 12 st 12 lb)
- Position: Centre / Rover
- Shot: Left
- Played for: Quebec Bulldogs; Ottawa Senators; Montreal Wanderers; Portage Lakes Hockey Club; Pittsburgh Victorias
- Playing career: 1898–1911

Charles Bruce Stuart (November 30, 1881 – October 28, 1961) was a Canadian amateur and professional ice hockey forward who played for the Quebec Bulldogs, Ottawa Senators, Montreal Wanderers, Portage Lakes Hockey Club, Pittsburgh Victorias and Pittsburgh Professionals from 1899 to 1911. Stuart is considered to be an early version of a power forward, a forward who combines size and physical play with scoring ability, in hockey history. Stuart won the Stanley Cup with both the Ottawa Senators and the Montreal Wanderers.

== Personal life ==
Stuart was born in Ottawa on November 30, 1881, one of five children to Captain William Stuart and Rachel Hodgson Stuart. He had two brothers: Allan Gilbert and William Hodgson (Hod) and two sisters: Jessie Maud and Lottie May. His father had been a lacrosse player of note with the Ottawa Capitals, as well as a curler, and his older brother Hod was also a well-known athlete.

== Playing career ==
Bruce and his older brother Hod played for Ottawa Hockey Club (Senators) in the Canadian Amateur Hockey League (CAHL) in 1899, in their home city of Ottawa. In 1900, they moved to Quebec City for business. They started playing hockey again in 1901, joining the Quebec Bulldogs in the CAHL. He then played professionally with the Pittsburgh Victorias in the Western Pennsylvania Hockey League (WPHL) in 1902–03 and in Houghton, with the Portage Lakes Hockey Club, in the old International Professional Hockey League (IPHL) between 1904 and 1907. With Portage Lakes Hockey Club he won two league titles in 1905–06 & 1906–07 as a teammate of Cyclone Taylor.

Stuart joined the Montreal Wanderers for the 1907–08 season in time to win the Stanley Cup in 1908, and then captained the Ottawa Senators in 1909 to the Stanley Cup.

Bruce Stuart's brother Hod, a defenseman who was considered one of the better hockey players in Canada at the time, died in a diving accident in the Bay of Quinte near Belleville, Ontario, on June 23, 1907, at an age of 28. At the time of the accident, the two brothers had not seen each other for over a year, as they had been playing in different cities.

In 1910, when the National Hockey Association (NHA) imposed a salary cap, cutting player's salaries in half, Stuart attempted to form a rival league. The rival league failed to organize, as the Montreal Arena was refused to the players. Stuart returned to captain the Senators to the 1911 Stanley Cup.

== Playing style ==
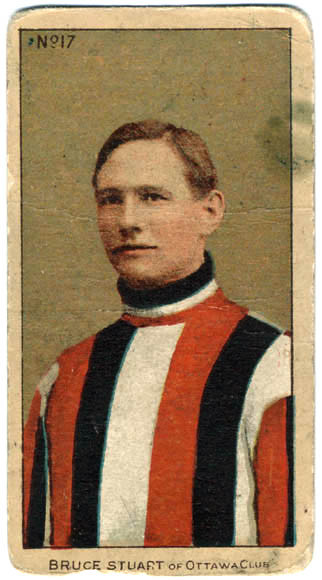
Stuart on a hockey card with the Ottawa Senators.

Bruce Stuart, a centre forward position wise, was a tall player for his era measuring around 6 feet in height, and weighing around 180 pounds. When Stuart replaced Ernie Russell at the centre forward position on the Montreal Wanderers in March 1908, the Ottawa Citizen recognized that while he "is not as tricky a scorer as Russell" he was thought "to be a better man carrying the disc through a defense", and the newspaper also recognized that he still had good shot. He also played occasionally at other forward positions, including rover and left wing.

Stuart employed a physical playing style along with his size, which earned him a fair share of injuries throughout his hockey career. During the 1910 NHA season Stuart suffered a broken left collarbone in game against the Renfrew Creamery Kings on February 12, after a scuffle with Hay Millar and a subsequent collision with Frank Patrick. The injury held him out for the remainder of the 1910 season and significantly weakened the Senators in their quest on defending the Stanley Cup against the Montreal Wanderers. Stuart had also, on different occasions during his hockey career, both of his knees dislocated, three ribs broken, his nose smashed twice, a bone in his right foot splintered, several teeth knocked out and his right hand fractured.

"They seemed satisfied with my work, and Manager [William] Jennings asked me to play with the team again next year. It's too far off to discuss the matter definitely now. Yet, I would like to have played for my home town last winter, but circumstances deemed otherwise. I joined [the] Wanderers, and every game in which I took part, whether against Ottawa, Shamrock[s] or any other team, I always played hard to win."

— Stuart on his time with the Montreal Wanderers in 1907–08. Montreal Star, April 2, 1908.

In the local Ottawa newspapers Stuart was often praised for his leadership qualities. During the 1910 season, when he captained the Ottawa Senators in the NHA, the Ottawa Journal claimed him "unanimously conceded to be the greatest hockey general that ever wore skates" and that he had "complete control over his men from the minute the game starts". The newspaper also noted him to be a clutch scorer and claimed that he had "scored more goals, at critical moments, when his team was behind, than any other forward in the game". Even when Stuart represented the Montreal Wanderers, a rivaling club to his hometown Ottawa Senators, in 1907–08, Stuart still claimed he always played hard to win, despite his expressed preference of representing Ottawa that winter.

== Post career ==
Stuart retired from playing after the 1910–11 season. He managed the Bruce Stuart and Co. shoe store he owned in Ottawa until 1952 along with some coaching. The shoe store, located at 275 Bank Street in Ottawa, outside of shoes and boots also sold skates.

After his player career Stuart took to golf and curling for recreation. As a golf player he was a member of the Ottawa Hunt and Golf Club. As a curling player he was active with the Ottawa Curling Club, and he donated a trophy to the club for competition.

Despite his age, he attended his induction into the Hockey Hall of Fame in Toronto in 1961. He died not long after, survived by his wife Irene Stuart (née MacDonald). He was interred at Beechwood Cemetery.

== Statistics ==
Exh. = Exhibition games

			Regular season					Playoffs
Season	Team	League	GP	G	A	Pts	PIM	GP	G	A	Pts	PIM
1899	Ottawa Hockey Club	CAHL	1	1	0	1	–	–	–	–	–	–
1900	Ottawa Hockey Club	CAHL	5	11	0	11	–	–	–	–	–	–
1901	Quebec Bulldogs	CAHL	6	5	0	5	–	–	–	–	–	–
1902	Ottawa Hockey Club	CAHL	8	9	0	9	–	–	–	–	–	–
1902–03	Pittsburgh Victorias	WPHL	10	16	6	22	20	–	–	–	–	–
1903–04	Portage Lakes Hockey Club	Exh.	14	44	0	44	6	9	28	0	28	13
1904–05	Portage Lakes Hockey Club	IPHL	22	33	0	33	59	–	–	–	–	–
1905–06	Portage Lakes Hockey Club	IPHL	20	15	0	15	22	–	–	–	–	–
1906–07	Portage Lakes Hockey Club	IPHL	23	20	9	29	81	–	–	–	–	–
1907–08	Montreal Wanderers	ECAHA	3	3	0	3	18	–	–	–	–	–
	Montreal Wanderers	Stanley Cup						3	8	0	8	18
1909	Ottawa Senators	ECHA	11	22	0	22	30	–	–	–	–	–
1909–10	Ottawa Senators	CHA	2	4	0	4	0	–	–	–	–	–
1910	Ottawa Senators	NHA	7	14	0	14	17	–	–	–	–	–
	Ottawa Senators	Stanley Cup						4	10	0	10	6
1910–11	Ottawa Senators	NHA	3	0	0	0	0	–	–	–	–	–
CAHL totalt			20	26	0	26	–	–	–	–	–	–
IPHL totalt			65	68	9	77	162	–	–	–	–	–
ECAHA + ECHA totals			14	25	0	25	48	–	–	–	–	–
NHA totals			10	14	0	14	17	–	–	–	–	–
Stanley Cup totals								7	18	0	18	24

== Achievements ==
- IPHL champion – 1905–06 & 1906–07 (Portage Lakes Hockey Club)
- Stanley Cup – 1908 (Montreal Wanderers); 1909, 1910 & 1911 (Ottawa Senators)

Preceded by Harvey Pulford	Ottawa Senators captain (Original Era); 1908–11	Succeeded by Marty Walsh
