= Hamby Shore =

Canadian ice hockey player

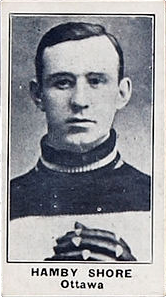
- Born: February 12, 1886; Ottawa, Ontario, Canada
- Died: October 13, 1918 (aged 32); Ottawa, Ontario, Canada
- Height: 6 ft 0 in (183 cm)
- Weight: 175 lb (79 kg; 12 st 7 lb)
- Position: Defence/Left wing
- Shot: Left
- Played for: Ottawa Senators; Winnipeg Maple Leafs; Winnipeg Strathconas
- Playing career: 1904–1918

Samuel Hamilton Shore (February 12, 1886 – October 13, 1918) was a Canadian professional ice hockey player who played several seasons for the Ottawa Senators between 1909 and 1918, notably during the "Silver Seven" era when the club was champion from 1903 until 1906. Shore died as a result of the influenza epidemic of 1918.

== Playing career ==
Hamby Shore joined the Ottawa Hockey Club in the Federal Amateur Hockey League as a teenager in 1904, when the club was already Stanley Cup champion. After one season, he played out west with Winnipeg Seniors, before returning to Ottawa in 1906–07, playing in the Eastern Canada Amateur Hockey Association. He returned to Winnipeg to play professionally, with the Winnipeg Maple Leafs and Winnipeg Strathconas. He played in the Maple Leafs' unsuccessful 1908 Stanley Cup challenge against the Montreal Wanderers.

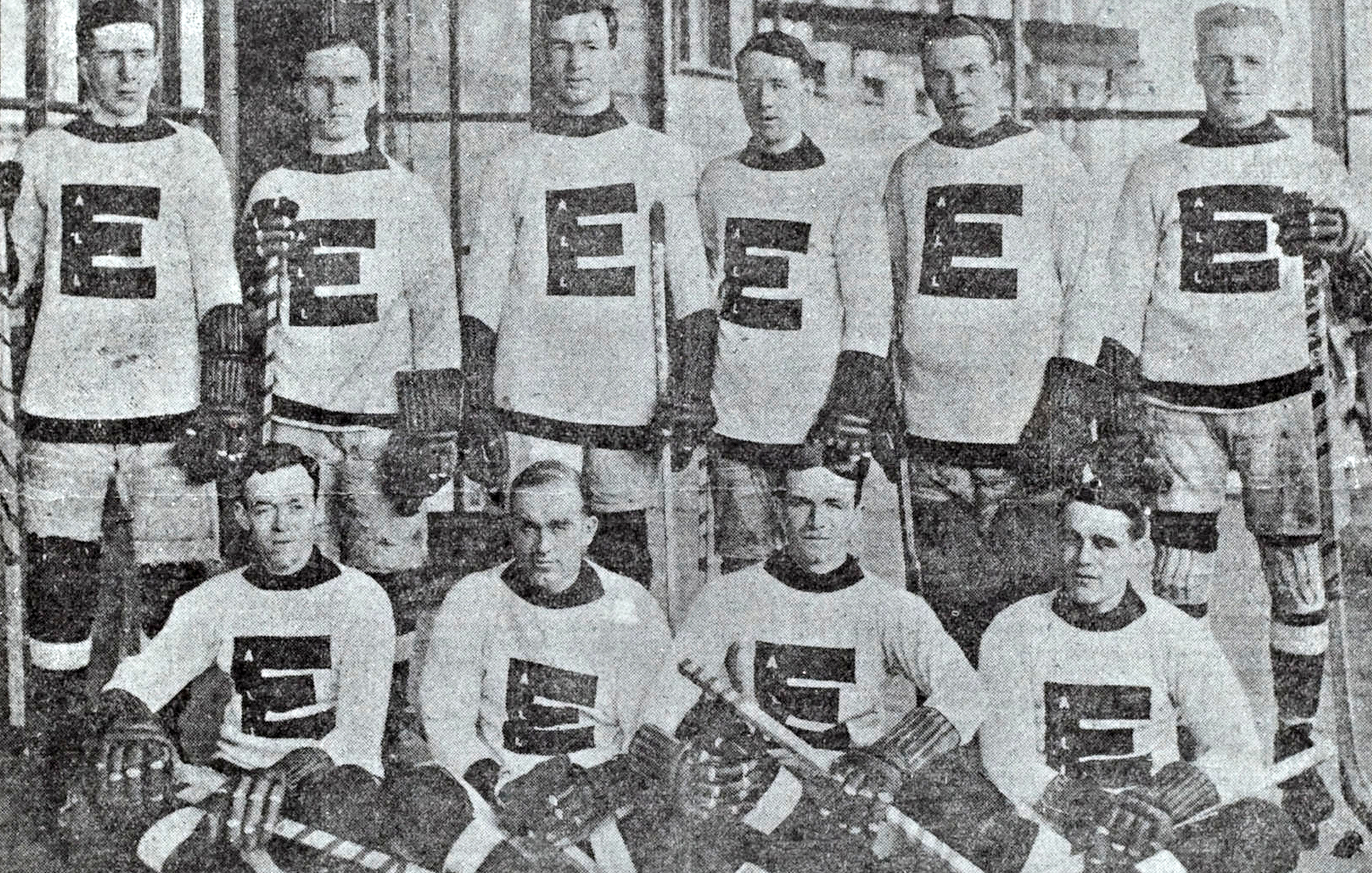
Shore, second from left in the top row, with the NHA All-Stars 1912.

Shore did not play during the following season, in 1908–09, due to illness.

Shore returned to Ottawa, now a professional club, in the 1909–10 season, playing in both the short-lived Canadian Hockey Association and in the National Hockey Association, and appeared on another Stanley Cup winner with the Senators. He was a member of a third Stanley Cup winner, in 1911. He would remain in the Ottawa organization for seven more years, until October 1918, when he died of the Spanish flu epidemic.

On the opening night of the NHL, Shore and teammate Jack Darragh had the first contract dispute in the league's history. They were late for the Senators’ game, which they would end up losing 7–4 to the Montreal Canadiens.

A multi-sport athlete, outside of ice hockey Shore was also a bowler of note, figuring on several of the championship teams in the Civil Service League. He also played baseball in the Civil Service series, and also played rugby football in his hometown of Ottawa. Shore was also involved in horse racing and had purchased a racing mare, Vivian S., entering her in races on both the Canadian and American racing circuits.

Shore also coached several amateur ice hockey teams in Ottawa, and he was a close friend of Ottawa Senators president Llewelyn Bate.

== Playing style ==
Playing at different positions throughout one's career was not an uncommon theme during Hamby Shore's era, and while starting as a forward he later switched to playing as a defenceman, most notably the cover point position, the more offensive position on defence. When Shore first came up with the Ottawa Hockey Club, he held down the left wing position, but he was moved down to cover point after Fred "Cyclone" Taylor had left Ottawa in 1909 for Renfrew. Other contemporary players who did similar jumps from forward to defence, throughout their careers, included Jack Marshall, Joe Hall, Ernie "Moose" Johnson, Fred Lake and Eddie Gerard. Shore was known as a very strong skater with good speed, which helped him in many corkscrew rushes up the ice.

== Personal life ==
Shore was the son of Mr. and Mrs. Samuel Shore. He married Ruby Legendre. When Ruby became ill with the flu in October 1918, Shore also fell ill. Shore died of pneumonia after a week's illness in Rideau Street Hospital. Shore was a civil servant with the federal Department of the Interior at the time of his death.

== Career statistics ==
=== Regular season and playoffs ===
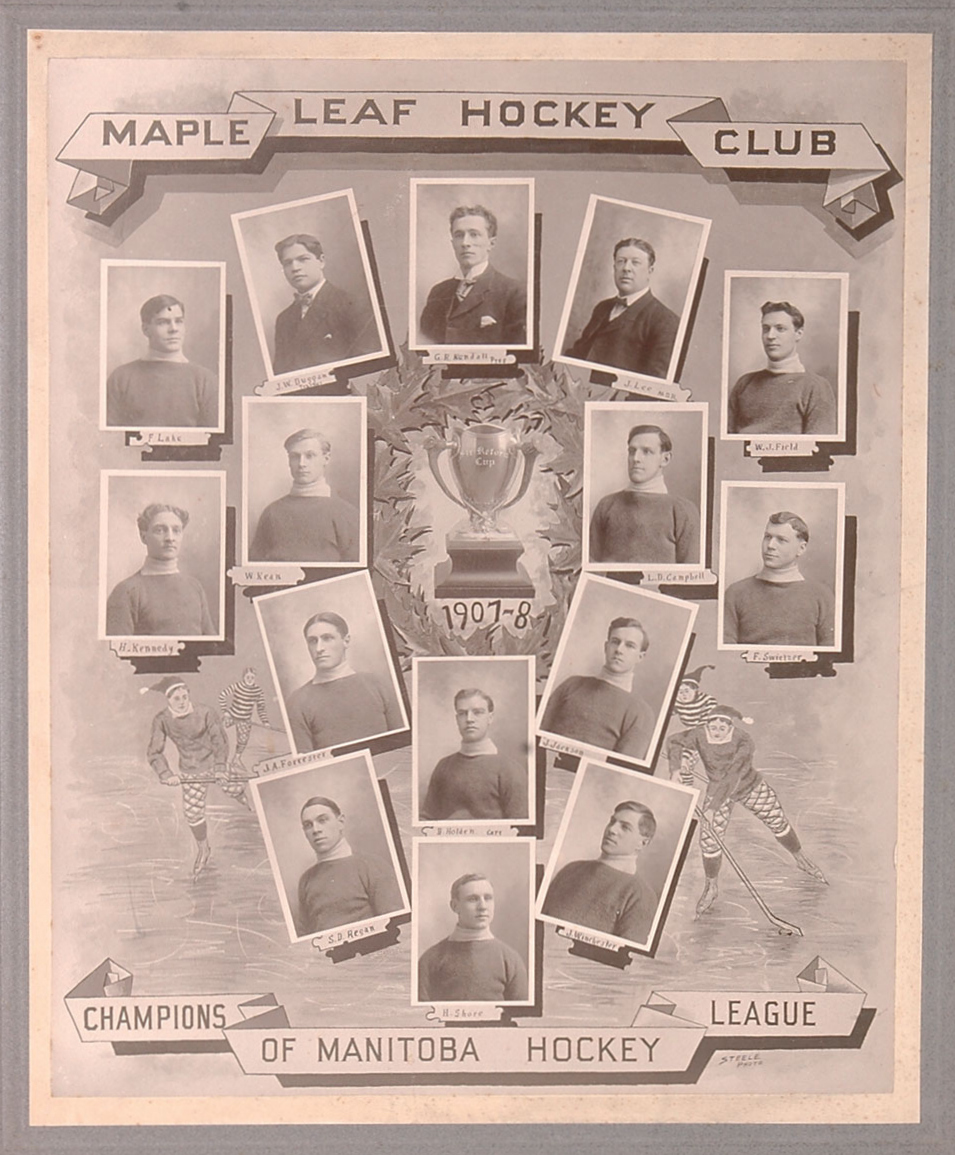
Shore, at the bottom, with the 1907–08 Winnipeg Maple Leafs.

| | | | Regular season | | | | | Playoffs |
| Season | Team | League | GP | G | A | Pts | PIM | GP | G | A | Pts | PIM |
|---|---|---|---|---|---|---|---|---|---|---|---|---|
| 1904–05 | Ottawa Senators | FAHL | 6 | 3 | 0 | 3 | — | 1 | 2 | 0 | 2 | — |
| 1905–06 | Winnipeg Seniors | MHA | — | — | — | — | — | — | — | — | — | — |
| 1906–07 | Pembroke Lumber Kings | UOVHL | 1 | 0 | 0 | 0 | 0 | — | — | — | — | — |
| 1906–07 | Ottawa Senators | ECAHA | 10 | 15 | 0 | 15 | — | — | — | — | — | — |
| 1907–08 | Winnipeg Strathconas | MPHL | 14 | 23 | 0 | 23 | — | — | — | — | — | — |
| 1907–08 | Winnipeg Maple Leafs | MPHL | 1 | 4 | 0 | 4 | — | — | — | — | — | — |
| 1907–08 | Winnipeg Maple Leafs | St-Cup | — | — | — | — | — | 2 | 2 | 0 | 2 | – |
| 1909–10 | Ottawa Senators | CHA | 2 | 2 | 0 | 2 | — | — | — | — | — | — |
| 1909–10 | Ottawa Senators | NHA | 12 | 6 | 0 | 6 | 44 | — | — | — | — | — |
| 1909–10 | Ottawa Senators | St-Cup | — | — | — | — | — | 4 | 3 | 0 | 3 | 6 |
| 1910–11 | Ottawa Senators | NHA | 16 | 7 | 0 | 7 | 53 | — | — | — | — | — |
| 1910–11 | Ottawa Senators | St-Cup | — | — | — | — | — | 2 | 0 | 0 | 0 | 6 |
| 1911–12 | Ottawa Senators | NHA | 18 | 8 | 0 | 8 | 35 | — | — | — | — | — |
| 1912–13 | Ottawa Senators | NHA | 19 | 15 | 0 | 15 | 66 | — | — | — | — | — |
| 1913–14 | Ottawa Senators | NHA | 13 | 6 | 3 | 9 | 46 | — | — | — | — | — |
| 1914–15 | Ottawa Senators | NHA | 20 | 5 | 1 | 6 | 53 | 5 | 0 | 0 | 0 | 0 |
| 1915–16 | Ottawa Senators | NHA | 19 | 2 | 1 | 3 | 83 | — | — | — | — | — |
| 1916–17 | Ottawa Senators | NHA | 19 | 11 | 6 | 17 | 88 | 2 | 0 | 0 | 0 | 6 |
| 1917–18 | Ottawa Senators | NHL | 18 | 3 | 8 | 11 | 51 | — | — | — | — | — |
| NHA totals | | | 136 | 60 | 11 | 71 | 468 | 7 | 0 | 0 | 0 | 6 |
| NHL totals | | | 18 | 3 | 8 | 11 | 51 | — | — | — | — | — |

== Achievements ==
- Stanley Cup Champion, 1905, 1910, 1911 with Ottawa
- ECAHA all-star, 1906–07
- Member of NHA all-stars touring British Columbia against PCHA teams in 1912.

== See also ==
- List of ice hockey players who died during their playing career
