= Fred Lake (ice hockey) =

Canadian ice hockey player

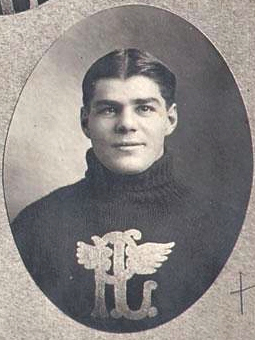
- Lake with the Portage Lakes HC.
- Born: March 12, 1883 Moosomin, Northwest Territories, Canada
- Died: November 29, 1937 (aged 54) Aylmer, Quebec, Canada
- Height: 5 ft 7 in (170 cm)
- Weight: 175 lb (79 kg; 12 st 7 lb)
- Position: Defence/Left wing
- Shot: Right
- Played for: Ottawa Senators; Toronto Ontarios; Winnipeg Maple Leafs; Michigan Soo Indians; Portage Lakes Hockey Club; Pittsburgh Athletic Club; Pittsburgh Keystones
- Playing career: 1902–1915

Frederick Edgar Lake (March 12, 1883 – November 29, 1937) was a Canadian professional ice hockey player. He was one of the first professional players and he played 181 games in various professional and amateur leagues, including the National Hockey Association, Eastern Canada Amateur Hockey Association, and International Professional Hockey League. Amongst the teams he played with were the Ottawa Senators and Toronto Ontarios. He won two Stanley Cups in 1909 and 1911 with Ottawa.

== Playing career ==
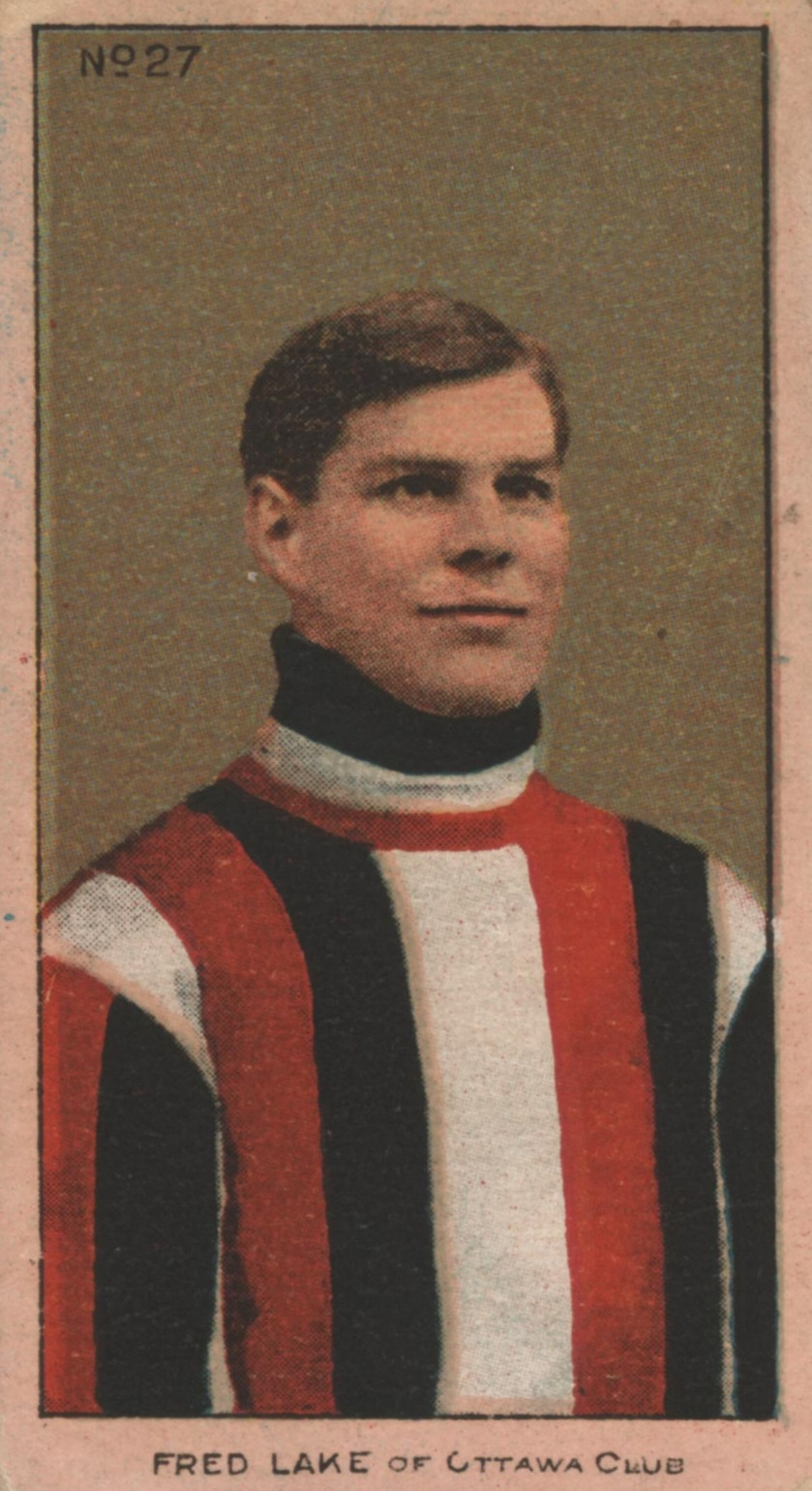
Lake with Ottawa HC on a 1911 Imperial Tobacco hockey card.

Born in Moosomin, Saskatchewan (then in the Northwest Territories), Fred Lake first played senior-level hockey for the Moosomin Hockey Club in 1900–01. In 1902, he turned professional with the Pittsburgh Keystones of the Western Pennsylvania Hockey League (WPHL). In 1903, he played for the Portage Lakes Hockey Club (of Houghton, Michigan) that claimed the "US Professional Championship". For 1903–04, he would sign up for the new International Professional Hockey League (IPHL) first playing for the Michigan Soo Indians in Sault Ste. Marie, Michigan before moving back to Portage Lakes, where he would play for three seasons until 1907.

Lake moved back to Canada in 1907, playing first for the Winnipeg Strathconas then the Winnipeg Maple Leafs. As a member of the Maple Leafs he would play in an unsuccessful Stanley Cup challenge against the Montreal Wanderers in 1908.

For the 1908–09 season, Lake signed with the Pittsburgh Athletic Club of the WPHL. However, after three games he was released because of his rough play. He was signed by the Ottawa Hockey Club of the Eastern Canada Amateur Hockey Association (ECHA) and helped Ottawa win the Stanley Cup. In the early years of his hockey career Lake had been a left winger, but with Ottawa he was converted into a defenceman. He would remain a player with Ottawa for four seasons, winning another Stanley Cup championship in 1911, before being traded to the Toronto Ontarios in 1913, where he played for one season. For his final season, he returned via a trade to Ottawa. He only played two games for the Senators that season and retired after the season.

== Death ==
Fred Lake was found dead in his car in an unoccupied shed at the rear end of a vacant house near Connaught Park Racetrack in Aylmer, Quebec near Ottawa on November 30, 1937, with the exhaust pipe of the automobile connected to the inside of the vehicle. Cause of death was deemed asphyxiation by carbon monoxide gas. He had been involved in a motor accident two years prior and had been in ill health ever since the accident. He was 54 years old.

== Statistics ==
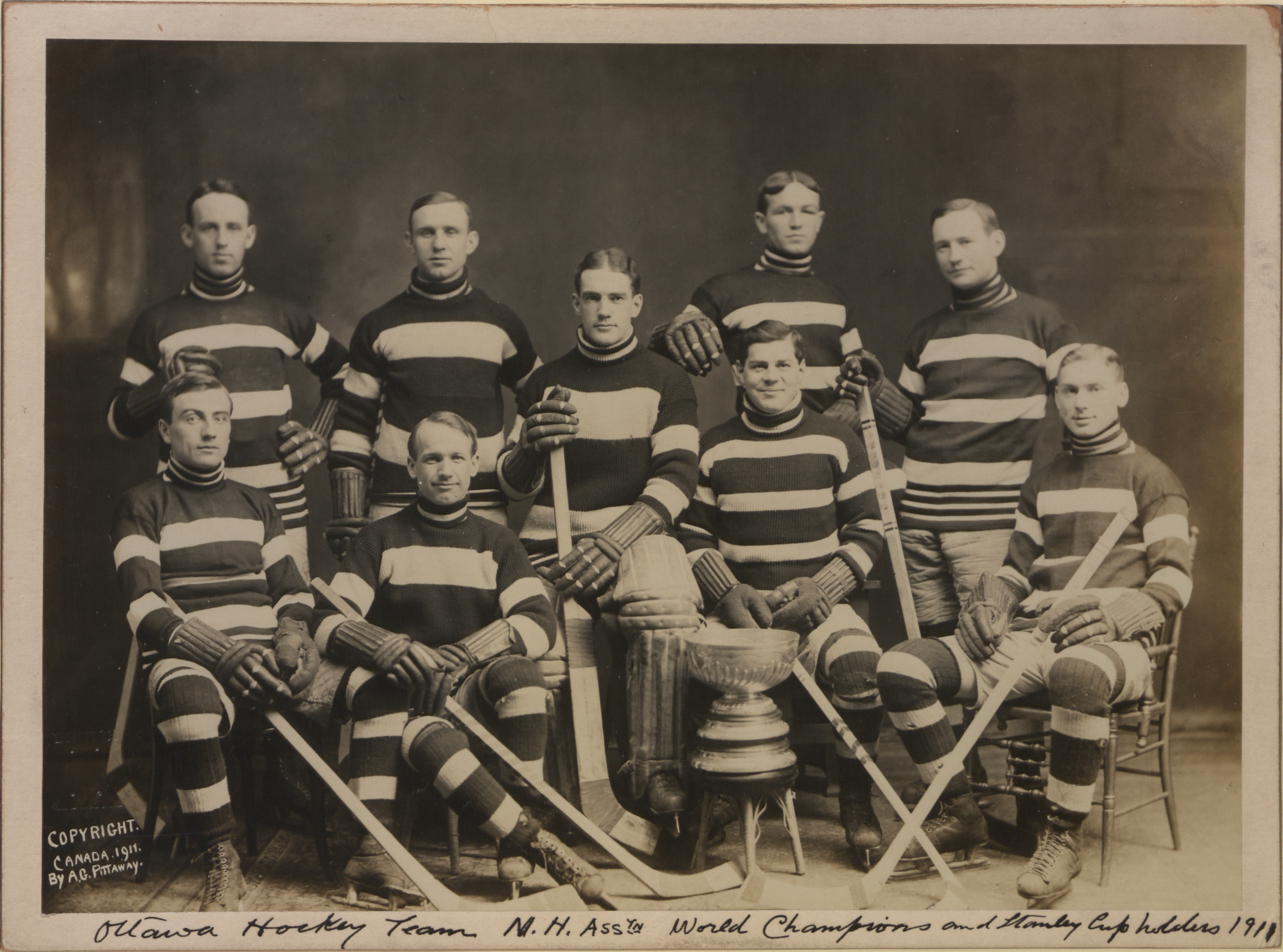
Fred Lake, sitting behind the Stanley Cup, with the Ottawa Senators in 1911.

Exh. = Exhibition games

| | | | Regular season | | | | | Playoffs |
| Season | Team | League | GP | G | A | Pts | PIM | GP | G | A | Pts | PIM |
|---|---|---|---|---|---|---|---|---|---|---|---|---|
| 1902–03 | Pittsburgh Keystones | WPHL | 5 | 1 | 1 | 2 | 4 | – | – | – | – | – |
| | Portage Lakes Hockey Club | Exh. | 2 | 8 | 0 | 8 | – | – | – | – | – | – |
| 1903–04 | Michigan Soo Indians | Exh. | 20 | 27 | 0 | 27 | – | – | – | – | – | – |
| 1904–05 | Portage Lakes Hockey Club | IPHL | 24 | 14 | 0 | 14 | 16 | – | – | – | – | – |
| 1905–06 | Portage Lakes Hockey Club | IPHL | 20 | 25 | 0 | 25 | 13 | – | – | – | – | – |
| 1906–07 | Portage Lakes Hockey Club | IPHL | 23 | 27 | 6 | 33 | 40 | – | – | – | – | – |
| 1907–08 | Winnipeg Strathconas | MPHL | 14 | 23 | 0 | 23 | – | – | – | – | – | – |
| | Winnipeg Maple Leafs | MPHL | 1 | 0 | 0 | 0 | 0 | – | – | – | – | – |
| | Winnipeg Maple Leafs | Stanley Cup | – | – | – | – | – | 2 | 2 | 0 | 2 | 5 |
| 1908–09 | Pittsburgh Athletic Club | WPHL | 3 | 3 | 0 | 3 | – | – | – | – | – | – |
| 1908–09 | Ottawa Senators | ECHA | 12 | 6 | 0 | 6 | 33 | — | — | — | — | — |
| | Ottawa Senators | Stanley Cup | – | – | – | – | – | 2 | 0 | 0 | 0 | 5 |
| 1909–10 | Ottawa Senators | CHA | 2 | 3 | 0 | 3 | 4 | – | – | – | – | – |
| 1910 | | NHA | 11 | 6 | 0 | 6 | 18 | – | – | – | – | – |
| | | Stanley Cup | – | – | – | – | – | 4 | 2 | 0 | 2 | 0 |
| 1910–11 | Ottawa Senators | NHA | 16 | 5 | 0 | 5 | 12 | – | – | – | – | – |
| | | Stanley Cup | – | – | – | – | – | 2 | 1 | 0 | 1 | 0 |
| 1911–12 | Ottawa Senators | NHA | 18 | 7 | 0 | 7 | 0 | — | — | — | – | – |
| 1912–13 | Ottawa Senators | NHA | 13 | 4 | 0 | 4 | 13 | — | — | — | – | – |
| 1913–14 | Toronto Ontarios | NHA | 20 | 4 | 4 | 8 | 23 | — | — | — | – | – |
| 1914–15 | Ottawa Senators | NHA | 2 | 0 | 0 | 0 | 0 | — | — | — | – | – |
| IPHL totals | | | 67 | 66 | 6 | 72 | 69 | – | – | – | – | – |
| NHA totals | | | 80 | 26 | 4 | 30 | 66 | – | – | – | – | – |
| Stanley Cup totals | | | – | – | – | – | – | 10 | 5 | 0 | 5 | 10 |

== Transactions ==
- Released by Pittsburgh Athletic Club (WPHL) for rough play, November 25, 1908
- Signed as a free agent by Ottawa (ECHA), December 1, 1909
- Traded to Toronto Ontarios (NHA) by Ottawa (NHA) for cash, December 4, 1913
- Traded to Ottawa (NHA) by Toronto Ontarios (NHA) for Percy LeSueur and $300, December 14, 1914
