= George Cochran =

George Cochran or Cochrane may refer to:

- George Cochran (baseball) (1889–1960), Major League Baseball player
- George M. Cochran (1912–2011), Virginia State Supreme Court Justice
- George Cochrane (ice hockey) (1881–1952), ice hockey player
- George Cochrane (footballer) (1877–1914), Australian rules football player
- George Cochrane (politician) (1762–?), Scottish soldier and politician
- George Cochran (footballer) (1870–1929), Scottish football pioneer in Spain

== See also ==
- George Cochrane Hazelton (1832–1922), U.S. representative from Wisconsin
- John George Cochrane (1781–1852), Scottish bibliographer
