= Pittsburgh Professionals =

- City: Pittsburgh, Pennsylvania, U.S.
- League: International Professional Hockey League
- Founded: 1904
- Operated: 1904–1907
- Home arena: Duquesne Garden
- Colors: Various

The Pittsburgh Professional Hockey Club, also referred to as the Pittsburgh Professionals and Pittsburgh Pros, were a professional ice hockey team that participated in the International Professional Hockey League (IPHL) from 1904 until 1907. The team's home arena was Duquesne Garden. It was the first inter-city professional hockey team in Pittsburgh, Pennsylvania. The Pros' line-ups included several important early professional hockey players, the most notable being Hod Stuart, who was considered, in certain hockey circles, to be the "greatest hockey player in the world."

== History ==
=== Origins ===
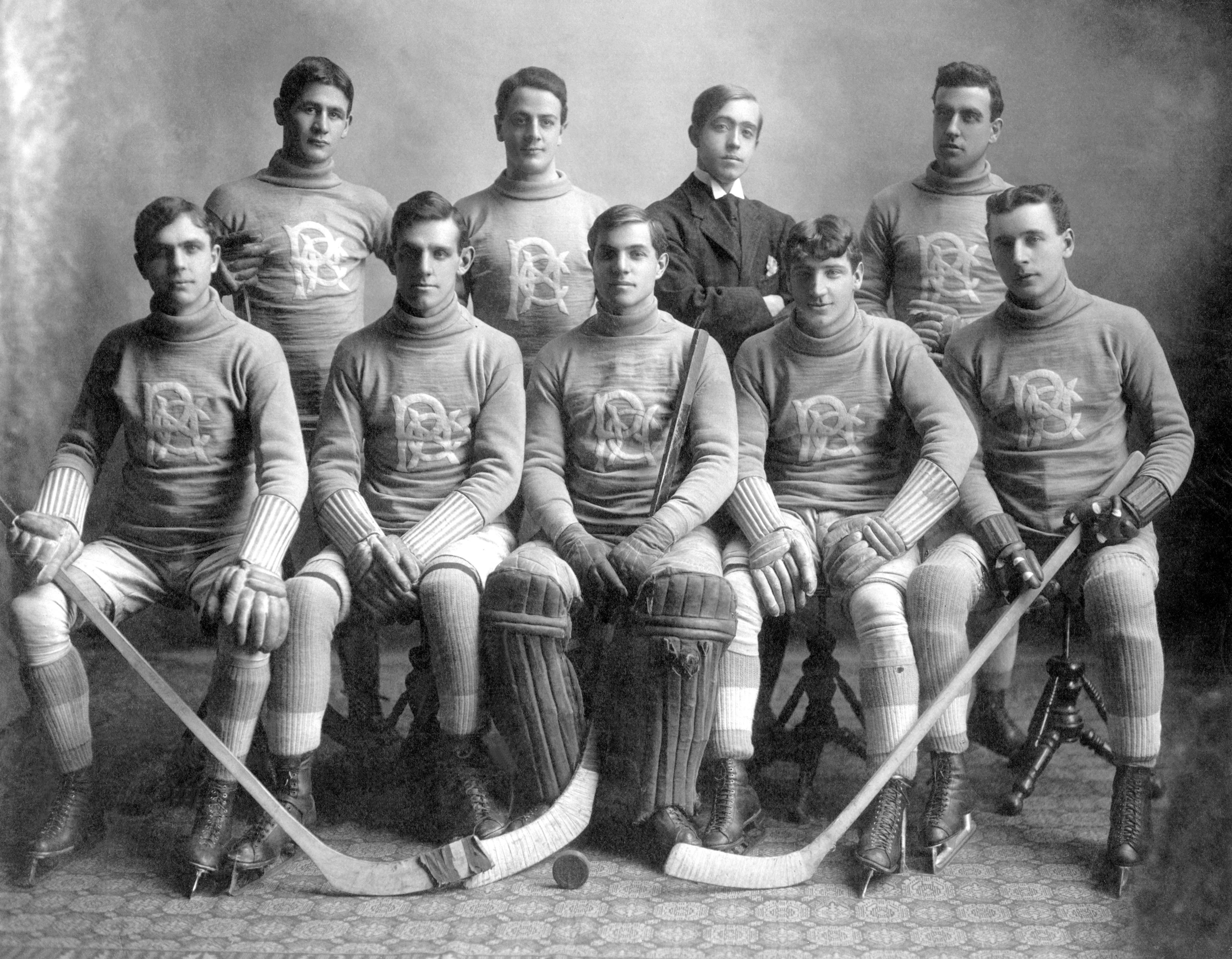
The Pittsburgh Professionals in 1906–07

The club was made up of players from the various teams of the Western Pennsylvania Hockey League (WPHL), which dissolved after the 1904 season. During the 1902–03 WPHL season, the league champion Pittsburgh Bankers competed against the Portage Lakes Hockey Club, which was based in Houghton, Michigan, for the "Pro Championship of the United States". A four-game series was arranged with Portage Lakes and the Bankers, with Portage Lakes winning the four game series 2–1 with a game tied, despite being outscored bt the Bankers, 11–6. In the fall of 1903, James R. Dee of Houghton started discussions with WPHL representatives in Pittsburgh to initiate discussion on the formation of a national hockey association. The next season, Portage Lakes continued to play professional exhibition games, but raided Pittsburgh's teams for top players like Riley Hern and Bruce Stuart. After the 1903–04 WPHL season, the Pittsburgh Victorias were defeated by Portage Lakes in a battle for the "American Championship".

A meeting was held on November 5, 1904 which included prominent business leaders from Pittsburgh, Sault Ste. Marie, Ontario and Northern Michigan. A number of cities were considered for this new professional league, however the league accepted teams from Houghton (Portage Lakes), Pittsburgh (Pros), Sault Ste. Marie, Ontario (Canadian Soo), Sault Ste. Marie, Michigan (Michigan Soo Indians) and Calumet & Laurium, Michigan (Calumet Miners). Also at this meeting, the representatives of the Canadian Soo suggested a revenue sharing plan that would divide gate receipts in a 60–40 home-visitor split. This revenue sharing plan would make the long journey to Pittsburgh possible, considering the Pros played at the high capacity (5,000 seats) Duquesne Garden. Although Pittsburgh much larger in size, to the other IPHL markets. However, like the other league markets, its population featured a large percentage of working-class citizens. While civic boosters helped drive the interest in the games in Michigan and Canada, Pittsburgh used its large population base and established hockey tradition to fill its arena. Pittsburgh's local supporters adopted nickname, "Coal Heavers," for their team.

== Season-by-season ==
The Pros did not fare well in its first season, posting only an 8–15–1 record for fourth place in the league. The Pros' inaugural season was also distracted by the actions and June 7, 1905 death of Pros' player William "Peg" Duval, due to alcoholism. Duval had been suspended in December 1904 without pay by the Pros for not being in condition to play although he returned to the team in time to score the winning goal in a game against Calumet on January 7, 1905. He was permanently released by the team in February 1905 for being unable to stay in condition to play. A Pittsburg Press newspaper report at that time said that "'Peggy' when in condition can hold his end up with any of them, but the wine when it is red seems to have a fascination for him, hence his downfall."

However the following season, the team acquired Hod Stuart, who was considered the best player of his era, in certain hockey circles. On December 11, 1905, before the start of the 1905–06 season, Stuart, who previously played in Pittsburgh (for the Bankers of the WPHL in 1903), was suspended from the league after the western teams complained that he had won too many championships and was too rough for the league. He was reinstated by the league on December 30, and joined the Pittsburgh Professionals. During the 1905–06 season the Professionals were one of three teams vying with Portage Lakes and Michigan Soo Indians for first place. However the Pros would finish the season in third place.

Stuart started the next season with Pittsburgh, but later left the team following a dispute. However the Pittsburgh line-up still included the recent addition of several notable players such as; Tommy Smith and Horace Gaul of the Ottawa Hockey Club and Jimmy Gardner of the Montreal Wanderers. These players joined Pros alumni; goalie Jack Winchester and Lorne Campbell in the line-up. Campbell and Smith finished ahead of future Hall-Of-Famers; Didier Pitre, Newsy Lalonde and Bruce Stuart in scoring. However Pittsburgh's play only earned the team another third-place finish in the standings.

The team's uniform colors were reported in successive seasons as gold (or yellow or orange) and black, maroon and white, and blue and white.

Year	GP	W	L	T	GF	GA	Pts	Ave	Finish
1904–05	24	8	15	1	82	144	17	.354	4th Place
1905–06	24	15	9	0	121	84	30	.625	3rd Place
1906–07	25	12	12	1	94	82	25	.500	3rd Place

== Demise ==
The team and the IPHL existed until after the 1906–07 season. The revenue-sharing program that granted the visiting team forty percent of the gate receipts, however proved to lead to the demise of the team and the league. The revenues would prove inadequate to maintain player salaries, particularly with the advent of other professional leagues, leading to the IPHL's collapse. However, the league's demise led to the rebirth of the WPHL, which was now a fully professional league.

== Prominent players ==
The following members of the Pittsburgh Professionals later became members of the Hockey Hall of Fame:

- Jimmy Gardner (1963)
- Tommy Smith (1973)
- Bruce Stuart (1961)
- Hod Stuart (1945)
