= Jim Mallen =

Canadian ice hockey player

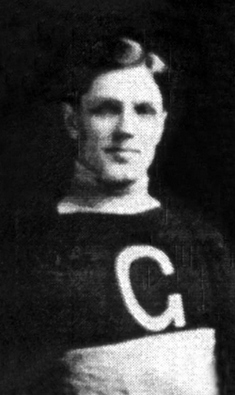
- Mallen with the Galt Professionals.
- Born: May 25, 1881 Morrisburg, Ontario
- Died: December 17, 1954 (aged 73) Morrisburg, Ontario
- Height: 1.65 m (5 ft 5 in)
- Weight: 75 kg (165 lb; 11 st 11 lb)
- Position: Center; Rover
- Played for: Sydney Socials; Sydney AAA; Sydney Nationals; Calumet Miners; Pittsburgh Lyceum; Toronto Professionals; Pittsburgh Bankers; Galt Professionals; Trenton; Belleville; Halifax Socials; Moncton Victorias; Sydney Millionaires; Halifax Crescents
- Playing career: 1901–1914

James Irwin "Jim, Kid" Mallen (May 25, 1881 – December 17, 1954) was a Canadian professional ice hockey player who was active with several clubs from 1901 to 1914. Amongst the teams Mallen played for were the Calumet Miners, Pittsburgh Lyceum, Pittsburgh Bankers, Toronto Professionals and Galt Professionals.

When with the Galt Professionals Mallen twice was on a team that challenged for the Stanley Cup, in January 1910 and in March 1911, but the Galt team lost both times to the Ottawa Senators.

Jim Mallen was a small player in stature even for his era but stocky built at 5'5" and approximately 165 pounds. He played primarily at the center and rover positions. His younger brother Ken Mallen also played professional ice hockey and was on the 1915 Vancouver Millionaires team that won the Stanley Cup.

== Statistics ==
			Regular season					Playoffs
Season	Team	League	GP	G	A	Pts	PIM	GP	G	A	Pts	PIM
1901–02	Sydney Socials	CBSHL	5	12	3	15	–	–	–	–	–	–
1902–03	Sydney Socials	CBSHL	8	20	4	24	–	1	1	0	1	0
1903–04	Sydney AAA	CBSHL	8	8	1	9	–	–	–	–	–	–
1904–05	Sydney Nationals	CBSHL	8	9	4	13	6	–	–	–	–	–
1905–06	Calumet Miners	IPHL	4	3	0	3	0	–	–	–	–	–
1906–07	Calumet Miners	IPHL	1	0	0	0	0	–	–	–	–	–
1907–08	Pittsburgh Lyceum	WPHL	16	24	0	24	–	–	–	–	–	–
1908–09	Toronto Professionals	OPHL	3	6	0	6	3	–	–	–	–	–
	Pittsburgh Bankers	WPHL	8	5	0	5	–	–	–	–	–	–
	Pittsburgh Lyceum	WPHL	8	4	0	4	–	–	–	–	–	–
1909–10	Galt Professionals	OPHL	7	10	0	10	3	–	–	–	–	–
		Stanley Cup	–	–	–	–	–	2	0	0	0	3
1910–11	Trenton	EOPHL	4	8	0	8	–	–	–	–	–	–
	Belleville	EOPHL	2	4	0	4	–	–	–	–	–	–
	Galt Professionals	OPHL	12	3	0	3	–	–	–	–	–	–
	Galt Professionals	Stanley Cup	–	–	–	–	–	1	0	0	0	0
1911–12	Halifax Socials	MaPHL	10	15	0	15	–	–	–	–	–	–
1912–13	Moncton Victorias	MaPHL	8	5	0	5	14	–	–	–	–	–
1913–14	Sydney Millionaires	MaPHL	2	1	0	1	0	2	0	0	0	0
	Halifax Crescents		7	1	0	1	3	–	–	–	–	–
WPHL totals			32	33	0	33	–	–	–	–	–	–
OPHL totals			22	19	0	19	6	–	–	–	–	–
MaPHL totals			27	22	0	22	17	2	0	0	0	0

Statistics from SIHR at sihrhockey.org
