= George Cochrane (ice hockey) =

Canadian ice hockey player

Goldie Cochrane
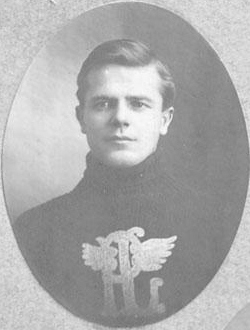
- Cochrane with the Portage Lakes HC.
- Born: September 27, 1881 Berlin, Ontario, Canada
- Died: April 15, 1952 (aged 70) Exeter, Ontario, Canada
- Height: 5 ft 7 in (170 cm)
- Weight: 150 lb (68 kg; 10 st 10 lb)
- Position: Rover
- Played for: Berlin Hockey Club; Portage Lakes Hockey Club; Berlin Dutchmen; Galt Professionals; All-Montreal Hockey Club; Waterloo Colts; Belleville
- Playing career: 1899–1911

John "Goldie" Cochrane (September 27, 1881 – April 15, 1952) was a Canadian professional ice hockey player.

== Biography ==
Born in Berlin (today known as Kitchener), Ontario, in 1881, Cochrane began playing hockey as a boy in Berlin in the 1890s. Beginning in 1900, he played for the amateur senior teams in Berlin and Galt. For the 1906–07 season, he moved to Houghton, Michigan, where he played for Houghton-Portage Lakes in the International Professional Hockey League. Cochrane, playing as a rover, participated in 17 games and scored 12 goals for Portage Lakes, helping the team win the league championship that year.

Cochrane joined the Canadian Expeditionary Force in 1914 and was sent overseas to fight in World War I. He returned to Canada in 1918 after being wounded. His playing career over, Cochrane relocated to Exeter, Ontario, and coached teams in the Ontario Hockey Association for several years. He died in 1952, at age 70.
