= Joe Hall (ice hockey) =

Canadian ice hockey player (1881–1919)

- Hockey Hall of Fame, 1961
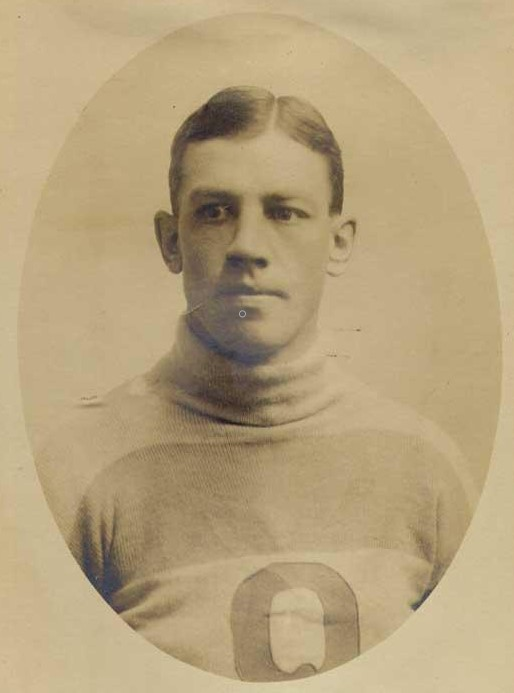
- Hall with the Quebec Bulldogs in 1912
- Born: May 3, 1881 Milwich, Staffordshire, England
- Died: April 5, 1919 (aged 37) Seattle, Washington, U.S.
- Height: 5 ft 10 in (178 cm)
- Weight: 175 lb (79 kg; 12 st 7 lb)
- Position: Defence / Right wing
- Shot: Right
- Played for: Montreal Canadiens; Quebec Bulldogs; Montreal Shamrocks; Montreal Wanderers; Winnipeg Maple Leafs; Montreal Hockey Club; Kenora Thistles; Brandon Wheat City
- Playing career: 1902–1919

Joseph Henry "Bad Joe" Hall (May 3, 1881 – April 5, 1919) was a Canadian professional ice hockey player. Known for his aggressive playing style, Hall played senior and professional hockey from 1902 to 1919, when he died as a result of the Spanish flu pandemic. He won the Stanley Cup twice with the Quebec Bulldogs and once with the Kenora Thistles, and became hospitalized while participating in the 1919 Stanley Cup Final, which were cancelled on April 1, six hours before the deciding game and four days before he died.

== Career ==
Hall was born in Milwich in Staffordshire, England. He moved with his family to Canada in 1884, initially going to Winnipeg, Manitoba before settling in Brandon, Manitoba. Details of Hall's life before 1902 are otherwise scarce.

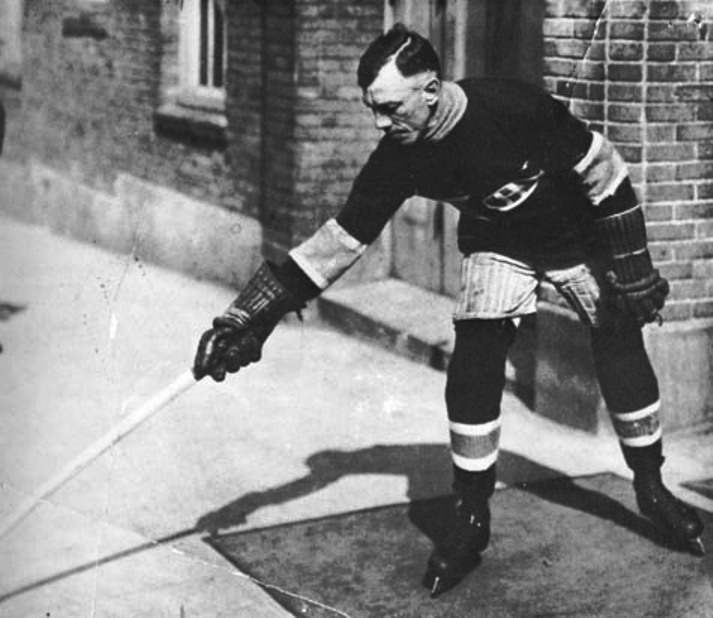
Hall with the Montreal Canadiens in 1917.

Nicknamed "Bad Joe" for his aggressiveness on the ice, he played in the Manitoba Hockey Association (MHA) with the Brandon Wheat City Hockey Club, Winnipeg Rowing Club and Kenora Thistles between 1902 and 1907, and in the first fully professional league, the International Professional Hockey League (IHL), where he was a teammate of Cyclone Taylor on the Portage Lakes Hockey Club during the 1905–06 season. Between 1907 and 1909 he played for the Montreal Shamrocks, Montreal Hockey Club and Montreal Wanderers in the Eastern Canada Amateur Hockey Association (ECAHA), after having been expelled from the MHA in December 1907 for rough play.

Between 1910 and 1917 Hall played in the National Hockey Association (NHA) as a member of the Quebec Bulldogs. On the Bulldogs he formed a successful defence pairing with Harry Mummery. He played for the Montreal Canadiens in their first two seasons in the National Hockey League from 1917 to 1919, after having been claimed from Quebec in the Dispersal Draft in November 1917.

Hall won the Stanley Cup with the Kenora Thistles in 1907, as a spare player, for which he received a loving cup which is on display in the Hockey Hall of Fame. He won the Stanley Cup with the Quebec Bulldogs in consecutive years in 1912 and 1913. He also challenged for the Stanley Cup in 1904 with the Winnipeg Rowing Club, losing over three games to the Ottawa Hockey Club.

=== 1919 Stanley Cup Final ===
In 1919, Hall was part of the Montreal Canadiens team that made it to the 1919 Stanley Cup Final. The Finals were interrupted, with the two clubs having won two games each, and were cancelled on April 1, six hours before the deciding game, due to an outbreak of Spanish flu. The flu was contracted by several players on both the Canadiens and their opponents, the Seattle Metropolitans. Hall eventually succumbed to pneumonia, related to his influenza, in a hospital in Seattle, Washington, just four days after the series was abandoned.

Hall was inducted into the Hockey Hall of Fame in 1961.

== Playing style ==
Hall, a right-handed shot, started out his hockey career as a forward, playing predominantly as a right winger. During the 1905–06 season with the Portage Lakes Hockey Club he scored 33 goals in 20 games in the International Hockey League from the right wing position. During the second half of his career he played as a defenceman. A Brooklyn Daily Eagle article from December 20, 1931 by Harold C. Burr, interviewing former player Lester Patrick, described Hall as a "fast hard-riding forward in the old days of seven-man hockey" and as a "scoring defense man, too, and a hard blocker." The article described further how Hall was "built like a tomcat, with long arms and legs."

"The 'Pegs were going down the ice and Hall had just jumped into the game when he and Tobin came together. Tobin was knocked down and as Hall circled past him he swung his stick around with the result that it crashed into Tobin's head with a sickening sound and the 'Peg player was stretched on the ice, afterwards being carried off."

— Winnipeg Tribune describing Hall's attack on Charlie Tobin on December 19, 1907

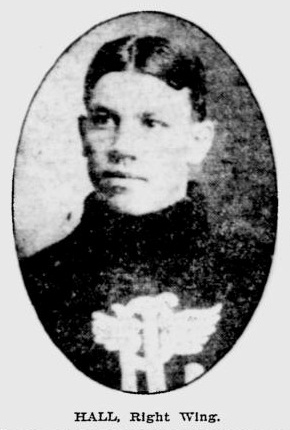
Hall in 1905–06 with the Portage Lakes Hockey Club, assigned as a right winger.

Hall had a reputation as one of the roughest and dirtiest players of his era, which earned him the moniker "Bad Joe", and he was involved in several instances of violence where he was reprimanded for attacking either opposing players or officials. On December 19, 1907, at the onset of the 1907–08 season, while playing for the Winnipeg Maple Leafs in a qualifying test game against the Winnipeg Hockey Club, Hall was involved in a contest which was dubbed a "disgraceful exhibition" by the Winnipeg Tribune, and the newspaper singled out Hall as the chief offender regarding violent displays. The game ended when the Winnipeg Hockey Club refused to continue playing, thus defaulting the game. The most blatant act of violence happened when he knocked down Charlie Tobin with his stick. Hall was subsequently expelled from the MHA along with Maple Leafs teammate Harry Smith.

During the inaugural NHA season in 1910, while playing for the Montreal Shamrocks in a game against the Cobalt Silver Kings, Hall attacked referee (and former Montreal Wanderers player) Rod Kennedy which prompted the NHA to expel him from the league, although he was later reinstated. Three years later, during the 1912–13 NHA season, he was again involved in a violent situation with an official as he kicked referee Tom Melville on the shins and later swung his stick against him.

"His philosophy was a little hard to understand, but it seemed he respected anyone who kept coming in his side, and didn't start avoiding him."

— Cy Denneny on Joe Hall

During the inaugural NHL season in 1917–18, while a member of the Montreal Canadiens, Hall was involved in a violent tussle with Alf Skinner, forward of the Toronto Arenas, during a game on January 28, 1918. Both players were arrested for assault and appeared in a Toronto court together on January 29 where both were released after being handed a suspended sentence.

Cy Denneny, a longtime left winger with the Ottawa Senators who played directly against (right defenceman) Hall in the NHA and NHL, claimed in an interview with Bill Westwick of the Ottawa Journal in December 1945 that Hall, despite his reputation as a dirty player, "was a friendly fellow also", off the ice. Denneny claimed that Hall had told him that he did not like opposing players who tried to avoid him by shifting sides, but that he had never been dirty towards Denneny because he came in on Hall's side minding his own business.

== Career statistics ==
=== Regular season and playoffs ===
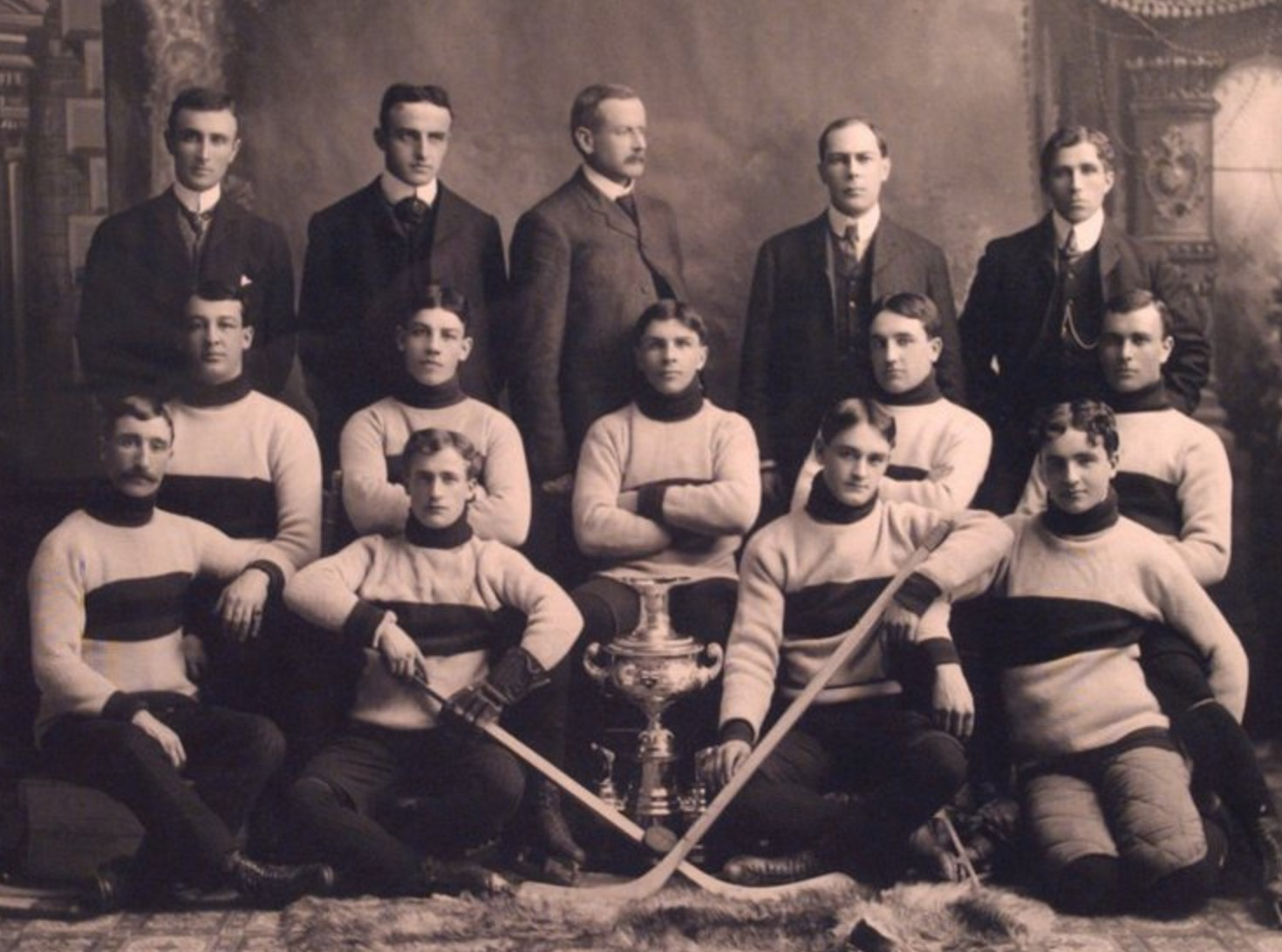
Hall (middle row, second from left) with the 1904 Winnipeg Rowing Club

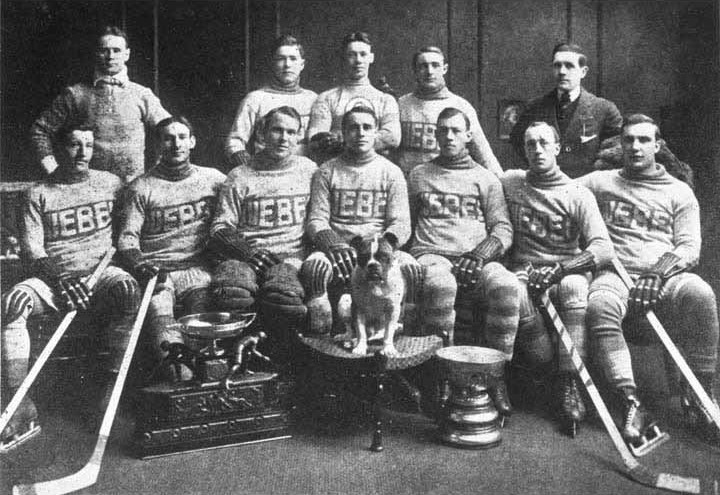
Hall (front row, third from right) with the 1913 Quebec Bulldogs

			Regular season					Playoffs
Season	Team	League	GP	G	A	Pts	PIM	GP	G	A	Pts	PIM
1901–02	Brandon HC	MNWHA	10	11	0	11	8	—	—	—	—	—
1902–03	Brandon HC	MNWHA	6	9	0	9	—	—	—	—	—	—
1903–04	Winnipeg Rowing Club	MHA	6	6	0	6	—	—	—	—	—	—
1903–04	Winnipeg Rowing Club	St-Cup	—	—	—	—	—	3	1	0	1	—
1904–05	Brandon HC	MPHL	8	11	0	11	—	—	—	—	—	—
1905–06	Portage Lakes HC	IHL	20	33	0	33	98	—	—	—	—	—
1906–07	Brandon HC	MPHL	10	15	1	16	32	2	5	0	5	5
1906–07	Kenora Thistles	St-Cup	—	—	—	—	—	—	—	—	—	—
1907–08	Winnipeg Maple Leafs	Exhib	3	4	—	4	—	—	—	—	—	—
1907–08	Montreal HC	ECAHA	4	5	0	5	11	—	—	—	—	—
1907–08	Montreal Shamrocks	ECAHA	4	4	0	4	6	—	—	—	—	—
1908–09	Edmonton HC	APHL	1	8	0	8	6	—	—	—	—	—
1908–09	Montreal Wanderers	ECHA	5	10	0	10	18	—	—	—	—	—
1908–09	Winnipeg Maple Leafs	MPHL	2	2	1	3	0	2	2	1	3	9
1909–10	Montreal Shamrocks	NHA	10	8	0	8	47	—	—	—	—	—
1909–10	Montreal Shamrocks	CHA	1	7	0	7	6	—	—	—	—	—
1910–11	Quebec Bulldogs	NHA	10	0	0	0	20	—	—	—	—	—
1911–12	Quebec Bulldogs	NHA	18	15	0	15	30	—	—	—	—	—
1911–12	Quebec Bulldogs	St-Cup	—	—	—	—	—	2	2	0	2	2
1912–13	Quebec Bulldogs	NHA	17	8	0	8	78	—	—	—	—	—
1912–13	Quebec Bulldogs	St-Cup	—	—	—	—	—	2	3	0	3	0
1913–14	Quebec Bulldogs	NHA	19	13	4	17	61	—	—	—	—	—
1914–15	Quebec Bulldogs	NHA	20	3	2	5	52	—	—	—	—	—
1915–16	Quebec Bulldogs	NHA	23	1	2	3	89	—	—	—	—	—
1916–17	Quebec Bulldogs	NHA	19	6	5	11	95	—	—	—	—	—
1917–18	Montreal Canadiens	NHL	21	8	7	15	100	2	0	1	1	12
1918–19	Montreal Canadiens	NHL	17	7	1	8	89	5	0	0	0	26
1918–19	Montreal Canadiens	St-Cup	—	—	—	—	—	5	0	0	0	6
NHA totals			137	52	17	69	489	—	—	—	—	—
NHL totals			38	15	8	23	189	7	0	1	1	38
St-Cup totals			—	—	—	—	—	12	6	0	6	—

== Awards and achievements ==
- International Professional Hockey League First Team All-Star (1906)
- Stanley Cup Championships (1907 with Kenora, 1912 and 1913 with Quebec)
- Inducted into the Hockey Hall of Fame in 1961
- Honoured Member of the Manitoba Hockey Hall of Fame

== See also ==
- List of ice hockey players who died during their playing careers
- List of National Hockey League players born in the United Kingdom

== Bibliography ==
- Feige, Timothy (2011), Hockey's Greatest Tragedies: The Broken Heroes of the Fastest Game on Earth, London, United Kingdom: Arcturus Publishing, ISBN 978-1-84837-742-4
