= Jack Winchester (ice hockey) =

Canadian ice hockey player

- Jack Winchester during the 1906–07 season with the Pittsburgh Pros
- Born: May 12, 1879 Toronto, Ontario, Canada
- Died: May 7, 1911 (aged 31) Edmonton, Alberta, Canada
- Height: 5 ft 8 in (173 cm)
- Weight: 155 lb (70 kg; 11 st 1 lb)
- Position: Goaltender
- Played for: Pittsburgh Professionals; Montreal Shamrocks; Winnipeg Maple Leafs; Edmonton Professionals
- Playing career: 1904–1911

John Alexander (Jack) "Winny" Winchester (May 21, 1879 – May 7, 1911) was a professional ice hockey player who played 93 games in various professional and amateur leagues, including the National Hockey Association (NHA) and International Professional Hockey League (IPHL). Among the teams he played with were the Montreal Shamrocks, Winnipeg Maple Leafs and the Pittsburgh Professionals. A goaltender with the Pittsburgh Pros from 1904–1907, he posted a record of 34-29 with the team.

== Family ==
John Alexander was the fourth child of Mary Butler and John Winchester, a Toronto lawyer and later judge.

In January 1910 he married Edna Studebaker in Edmonton, Alberta. Days later, the couple travelled with the Edmonton team on their trip east for the Stanley Cup tournament.

== Death ==
He died in Edmonton on May 7, 1911, at the age of 31, having fallen ill with acute diabetes two days earlier. He was interred at Edmonton Municipal Cemetery on May 10, 1911.
