= Winnipeg Maple Leafs =

- City: Winnipeg, Manitoba
- League: Manitoba Professional Hockey League
- Operated: 1907–1909
- Head coach: Jack Lee, 1907–08
- Captain: Barney Holden, 1907–08

Championships
- Regular season titles: MPHL 1907–08

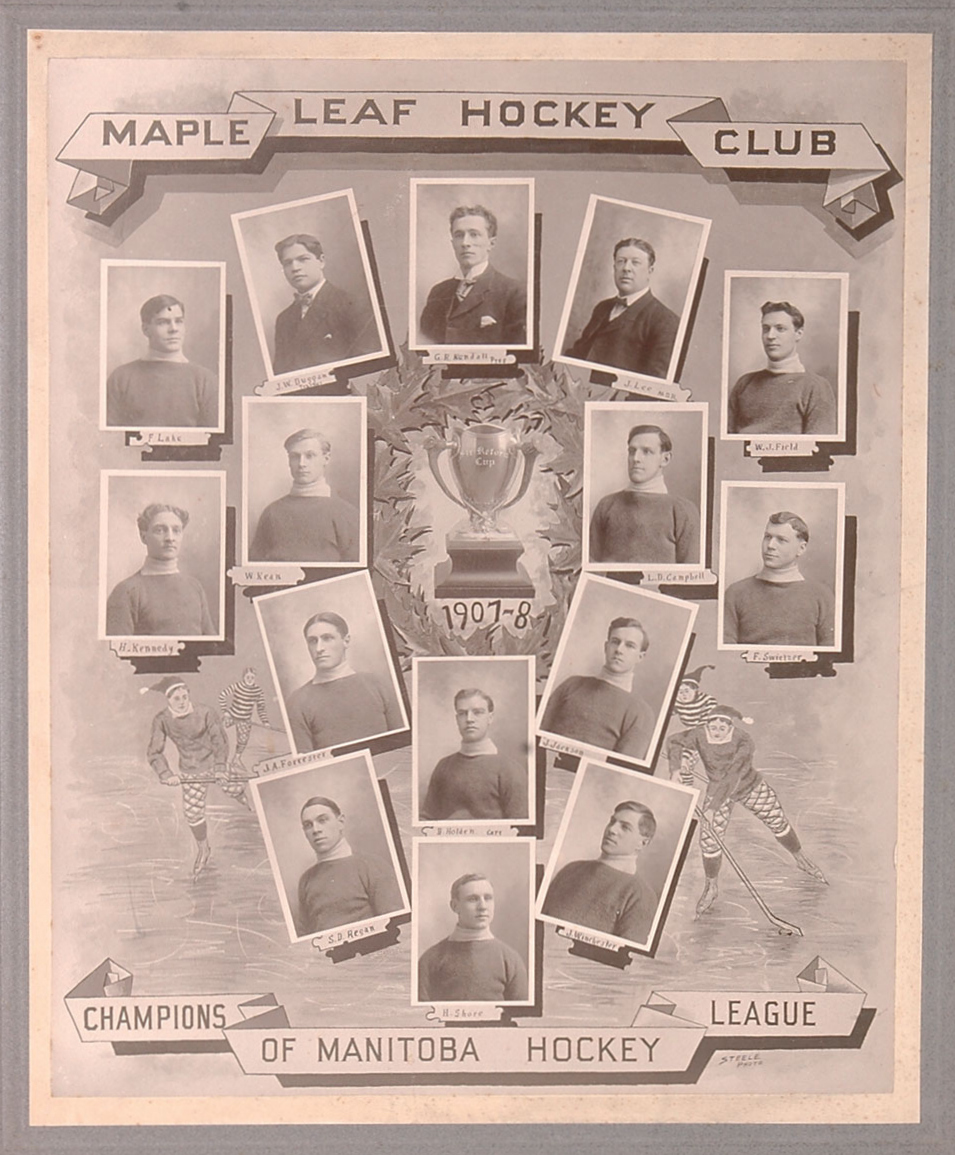
Winnipeg Maple Leafs in the 1907–08 season. Top row, left to right: Fred Lake, James W. Duggan, G. R. Kendall, Jack Lee, W. J. Field. Second row from the top, left to right: Harry Kennedy, William Kean, Lorne Campbell, Frank Swietzer. Third row from the top, left to right: J. A. "Grindy" Forrester, Barney Holden, J. Jackson. Bottom row, left to right: Stephen Darcy Regan, Hamby Shore, Jack Winchester.

The Winnipeg Maple Leafs, or Maple Leaf Hockey Club, were a professional men's ice hockey team in Winnipeg, Manitoba. Winnipeg Maple Leafs played in the Manitoba Professional Hockey League from 1907 to 1909.

In March 1908, as 1907–08 MPHL champions, the team challenged for the Stanley Cup but lost over two games to the Montreal Wanderers, 5-11 and 3–9. The 1908 Winnipeg Maple Leafs team included such players as Barney Holden, Jack Winchester, Lorne Campbell, Hamby Shore and Fred Lake.

Tommy Dunderdale, member of the Hockey Hall of Fame, played three games for the team and scored one goal in the 1907–08 season. Joe Hall, also a member of the Hockey Hall of Fame, played two games for the club in the 1908–09 season and scored two goals.
