= Canadian Hockey Association (1909–10) =

Canadian professional ice hockey association

The Canadian Hockey Association (CHA) was an early men's professional ice hockey league. It was founded in November, 1909, as the result of a dispute within the Eastern Canada Hockey Association. The CHA survived only a few weeks of play in January 1910 before two teams jumped to the new National Hockey Association (NHA), itself a seven-week-old league, causing dissolution of the CHA.

The CHA held the Stanley Cup for its entire eight week existence, as the reigning champion Ottawa Hockey Club was a founding member.

== History ==
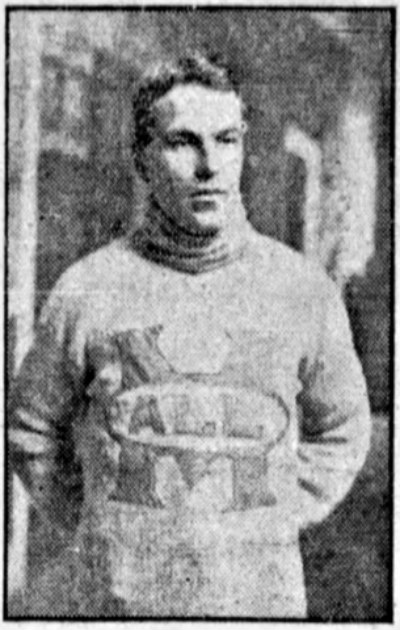
Paddy Moran of the All-Montreal team.

At the regular annual meeting of the Eastern Canada Hockey Association, held at the Windsor Hotel in Montreal on November 25, 1909, three teams from the ECHA (Ottawa, Quebec, and the Montreal Shamrocks) resigned and formed the new Canadian Hockey Association. The new league then took applications from other teams including their former partner the Montreal Wanderers of the ECHA. The three teams had decided to form the new league after the Wanderers were sold to new owners that wanted to move the club to the smaller Jubilee Arena from their former home, the Montreal Arena. The other clubs, most specifically Ottawa, then the Stanley Cup champions, wanted to only play at the Montreal Arena. The CHA then opened their association to applications from other hockey clubs, rejecting applications from Wanderers which did not commit to the Arena, while accepting two other teams: the All-Montreal, organized by former Wanderers captain Art Ross, and the francophone Montreal Le National.

Play started on December 30. After a few games it was clear that fan interest was not there as only 800 fans were recorded for the game between the Nationals and the Shamrocks. After the January 8 game between All-Montreal and Ottawa, which was attended by only 1500 fans, Art Ross made plans to suspend the All-Montreal team and, along with Paddy Moran, join the Haileybury team of the NHA. League secretary Emmett Quinn notified the Ottawa team that the situation was hopeless. The Shamrocks announced that they would abandon the league. The CHA owners decided to proceed with an amalgamation with the NHA, entitling the league the "Canadian-National Hockey League".

A meeting with the NHA on January 15, 1910, was planned to consider amalgamation with the CHA, but amalgamation was not discussed. Instead the NHA admitted Ottawa, Quebec, and the Shamrocks. The Le National were offered the franchise of Les Canadiens, but declined, partly due to the Canadiens' lease with the Jubilee Arena. No invitation was offered to All-Montreal and Quebec. The CHA ceased operations.

During its brief season, the Ottawa Hockey Club won a Stanley Cup challenge against Galt HC, champions of the Ontario Professional Hockey League (OPHL). For this, and a challenge during the NHA season, the Senators are considered co-champions of the Stanley Cup in 1910.

== Final standing ==
Team	GP	W	L	T	GF	GA
Ottawa Hockey Club	3	3	0	0	44	12
Quebec Bulldogs	3	2	1	0	20	22
All-Montreal HC	4	2	2	0	20	24
Montreal Shamrocks	4	2	2	0	32	33
Montreal Le National	4	0	4	0	25	50

== Season summary ==
Month	Day	Visitor	Score	Home	Score
Dec.	30	All-Montreal	7	Le National	2
Jan.	1	Quebec	7	Shamrocks	6
Jan.	4	Shamrocks	6	All-Montreal	3
Jan.	8	All-Montreal	5	Quebec	1
Jan.	8	Ottawa	14	Le National	4
Jan.	11	Le National	8	Shamrocks	17
Jan.	13	Ottawa	15	All-Montreal	5
Jan.	15	Le National	11	Quebec	12
Jan.	15†	Shamrocks	3	Ottawa	15

† This game, a scheduled CHA game, was counted in the NHA schedule.

== Games scheduled but not played ==
Month	Day	Visitor	vs	Home
January	18	Quebec	vs	Le National
January	20	All-Montreal	vs	Shamrocks
January	22	Quebec	vs	All-Montreal
January	22	Le National	vs	Ottawa
January	24	Ottawa	vs	Quebec
January	25	Shamrocks	vs	Le National
January	27	Ottawa	vs	Shamrocks
January	29	All-Montreal	vs	Ottawa
January	29	Shamrocks	vs	Quebec
February	1	Le National	vs	All-Montreal
February	2	Quebec	vs	Ottawa
February	5	Ottawa	vs	Le National
February	5	All-Montreal	vs	Quebec
February	8	Le National	vs	Shamrocks
February	10	Ottawa	vs	All-Montreal
February	12	Shamrocks	vs	Ottawa
February	12	Le National	vs	Quebec
February	15	All-Montreal	vs	Le National
February	17	Quebec	vs	Shamrocks
February	19	Ottawa	vs	Quebec
February	19	Shamrocks	vs	All-Montreal
February	22	Quebec	vs	Le National
February	24	Ottawa	vs	Shamrocks
February	26	All-Montreal	vs	Ottawa
February	26	Shamrocks	vs	Quebec
March	1	Le National	vs	Ottawa
March	1	Quebec	vs	All-Montreal
March	3	Shamrocks	vs	Le National
March	5	All-Montreal	vs	Shamrocks
March	5	Quebec	vs	Ottawa
March	8	Le National	vs	All-Montreal

== Stanley Cup Challenges ==
During the CHA season, Ottawa as Cup champion played one challenge in addition to their regular schedule:

=== Ottawa vs. Galt ===
Ottawa played a two-game total goals series against Galt HC, champions of the Ontario Professional Hockey League and prevailed with 12–3 and 3–1 victories. Marty Walsh led Ottawa with 6 goals. Jim Mallen, older brother of Ottawa's Ken Mallen played for Galt.

Date	Winning Team	Score	Losing Team	Location
January 5, 1910	Ottawa Hockey Club	12–3	Galt	The Arena
January 7, 1910	Ottawa Hockey Club	3–1	Galt	The Arena
Ottawa wins total goals series 15 goals to 4

January 5
Galt	3	at	Ottawa	12
Hugh Lehman		G	Percy LeSueur
Pete Charlton		P	Fred Lake	1
Ras Murphy		CP	Ken Mallen
Charles Manson	2	RO	Bruce Stuart, Capt.	2
Jim Mallen		C	Marty Walsh	6
Art Dusome		LW	Hamilton Hamby Shore	2
Fred Doherty	1	RW	Bruce Ridpath	1
Referee - Russell Bowie

January 7
Galt	1	at	Ottawa	3
Hugh Lehman		G	Percy LeSueur
Pete Charlton	1	P	Fred Lake	1
Ras Murphy		CP	Hamilton Hamby Shore
George Cochrane		RO	Bruce Stuart, Capt.	1
Jim Mallen		C	Marty Walsh
Art Dusome		LW	Dave Kerr
Fred Doherty		RW	Bruce Ridpath	1
Referee - Lester Patrick & Charles Spittal

== Stanley Cup engraving ==
The 1910 Stanley Cup was presented by the trophy's trustee William Foran.

The following Ottawa Hockey Club players and staff were members of the Stanley Cup winning team.

1910 Ottawa Hockey Club Senators

=== Players ===
Centres

- Bruce Stuart(rover)(rover-Captain)
- Walter Smaill(rover)
- Marty Walsh (center)

Wingers

- Albert "Dubbie" Kerr (left wing)
- Bruce Ridpath (right wing)
- Gordon "Doc" Roberts (left wing)

Defencemen

- Fred Lake (point)
- Ken Mallen (point/cover point)
- Hamilton Hamby Shore (cover point-left wing)

Goaltenders

- Percy LeSueur

=== Coaching and administrative staff ===
- Thomas D'arcy McGee (President)†, Llewellyn Bates (Vice President)†
- Pete Green (Coach)†, Patrick Basketville (Treasurer)†
- Martin Rosenthal (Secretary)†, Mac McGilton (Trainer)†
- Charles Sparks†, Charles Bryson†, Dave Mulligan† (Directors)
- Percy Butler†, Charles Irvin† (Directors)

†known non-playing members of the 1910 Ottawa Hockey Club. No team picture of Ottawa in 1910 has been found.

=== Stanley Cup engraving ===
Ottawa engraved "Ottawa 1910" and "OTTAWA vs GALT/OTTAWA vs EDMONTON".

== See also ==
- Hockey Canada
- List of Stanley Cup champions
- List of pre-NHL seasons
- List of ice hockey leagues

Preceded by Ottawa Hockey Club; 1909	Ottawa Hockey Club; Stanley Cup Champions; January 1910	Succeeded by Montreal Wanderers; March 1910
Preceded by 1909 ECHA season	pre-NHL seasons 1910	Succeeded by 1910 NHA season
