= Galt Professionals =

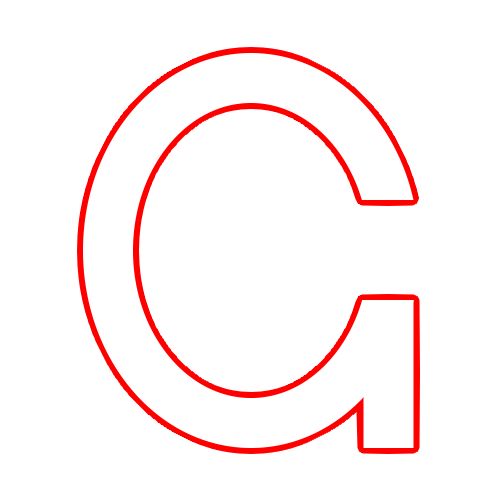
- City: Galt; Ontario; Canada
- League: OPHL
- Founded: 1909
- Operated: 1909-1911
- Home arena: Queens Square Arena
- Colours: Red, white
- Head coach: Art Serviss (1910)

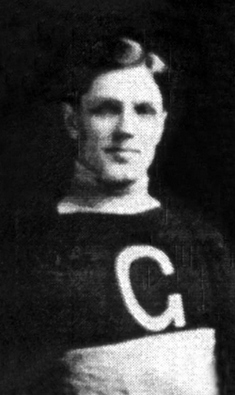
Jim Mallen with the Galt Professionals in 1911.

The Galt Professionals were a professional ice hockey team from Galt, Ontario in Canada. The team played for three seasons in the Ontario Professional Hockey League, from 1909 to 1911.

Galt Professional won the OPHL league title twice, in 1909 and 1911, and challenged for the Stanley Cup in January 1910 and in March 1911. Both times Galt lost to the Ottawa Senators.

== Notable players ==
Notable players who played for the Galt Professionals were goaltender Hugh Lehman and center Tommy Smith, who both are inducted in the Hockey Hall of Fame.
