= Portage Lakes Hockey Club =

- City: Houghton, Michigan
- League: Independent (1900–1904); International Professional Hockey League (1904–1907); United States Amateur Hockey Association (1920–1922)
- Founded: 1900–01
- Home arena: Amphidrome on Portage Lake
- Colors: Green, White

Championships
- Regular season titles: 2 (1905–06, 1906–07)

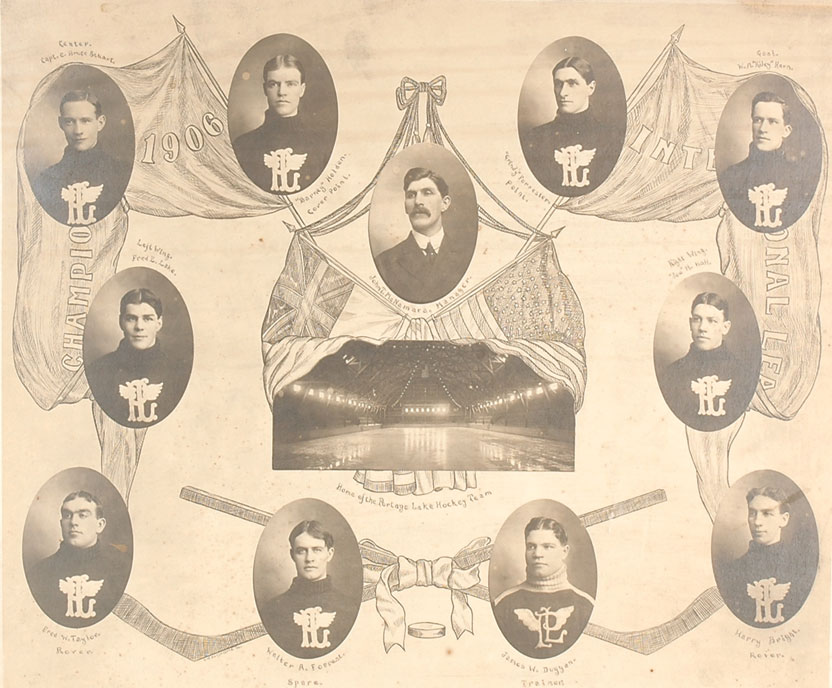
Team picture, 1905-06. Clockwise from top left: Bruce Stuart (captain), Barney Holden, John T. McNamara (manager), Grindy Forrester, W.M. Riley Hern (goaltender), Joe H. Hall, Harry Bright, James W. Duggan (trainer), Walter A. Forrest, Fred W. "Cyclone" Taylor, Fred E. Lake.

The Portage Lakes Hockey Club was one of the first professional ice hockey clubs. Based in Houghton, Michigan, the club played at the Amphidrome from 1904 until 1907, and later appeared in amateur circuits as well. While members of the International Professional Hockey League, the team won the league championship twice. A second coming of the team is playing in the Great Lakes Hockey League.

The club was founded in 1900–01 around Berlin, Ontario native defenceman and future Hockey Hall of Fame inductee Dr. Jack Gibson, who had arrived in Houghton to practice dentistry.

From 1920–1922 the team played two seasons in the western Group 3 of the United States Amateur Hockey Association.

== Players ==
Among the players on the team were:

- Jack Gibson
- George Cochrane
- Joe Hall
- Riley Hern
- Barney Holden
- Fred Lake
- Bruce Stuart
- Cyclone Taylor

== See also ==
- International Professional Hockey League
