= 1904–05 IPHL season =

Hockey season

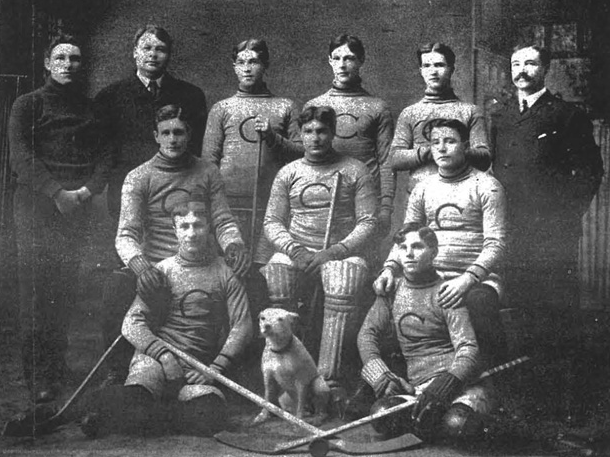
Calumet-Laurium Miners, league champions

The 1904–05 IPHL season was played by teams of the International Professional Hockey League. It marked the first season in the league’s history. It’s also the only season the Calumet-Laurium Miners won the league title.

== Final standing ==
Note GP = Games Played, W = Wins, L = Losses, T = Ties, GF = Goals For, GA = Goals Against, Pts = Points

Team	GP	W	L	T	GF	GA	Pts
Calumet-Laurium Miners	24	18	5	1	131	75	37
Houghton-Portage Lakes	24	15	7	2	98	81	32
Michigan Soo Indians	24	10	13	1	81	79	21
Pittsburgh Pros	24	8	15	1	82	144	17
Canadian Soo	24	6	17	2	97	140	13

Preceded by 1903–04 (WPHL)	IPHL seasons 1904–05	Succeeded by 1905–06
