= 1906–07 IPHL season =

Ice hockey league season

The 1906–07 IPHL season was played by teams of the International Professional Hockey League.

== Final standing ==
Note GP = Games Played, W = Wins, L = Losses, T = Ties, GF = Goals For, GA = Goals Against, Pts = Points

Team	GP	W	L	T	GF	GA	Pts
Houghton-Portage Lakes	24	16	8	0	102	102	32
Canadian Soo	24	13	11	0	124	123	26
Pittsburgh Pros	24	12	12	1	94	82	25
Michigan Soo Indians	24	11	13	0	103	88	22
Calumet Wanderers	24	8	26	1	96	124	17

Preceded by 1905–06	IPHL seasons 1906–07	Succeeded by 1908 (WPHL)
