= 1905–06 IPHL season =

Ice hockey league season

The 1905–06 IPHL season was played by teams of the International Professional Hockey League.

== Final standing ==
Note GP = Games Played, W = Wins, L = Losses, T = Ties, GF = Goals For, GA = Goals Against, Pts = Points

Team	GP	W	L	T	GF	GA	Pts
Houghton-Portage Lakes	24	19	5	0	104	71	38
Michigan Soo Indians	24	18	6	0	126	57	36
Pittsburgh Pros	24	15	9	0	123	83	30
Calumet Miners	24	7	17	0	48	107	14
Canadian Soo	24	1	23	0	55	137	2

== Results ==
Month	Day	Visitor	Score	Home	Score
Dec.	11	Canadian Soo	0	Calumet	6
Dec.	12	Canadian Soo	1	Calumet	2
Dec.	12	Michigan Soo	2	Pittsburgh	3
Dec.	14	Canadian Soo	6	Portage Lakes	13
Dec.	14	Michigan Soo	2	Pittsburgh	4
Dec.	16	Michigan Soo	6	Pittsburgh	2
Dec.	20	Portage Lakes	4	Calumet	0
Dec.	22	Michigan Soo	8	Canadian Soo	3
Dec.	23	Portage Lakes	6	Calumet	3
Dec.	26	Canadian Soo	5	Michigan Soo	16
Jan.	1	Pittsburgh	10	Canadian Soo	5
Jan.	2	Pittsburgh	13	Canadian Soo	6
Jan.	4	Calumet	0	Michigan Soo	8
Jan.	4	Pittsburgh	3	Portage Lakes	5
Jan.	5	Calumet	1	Michigan Soo	9
Jan.	5	Pittsburgh	6	Portage Lakes	2
Jan.	8	Calumet	1	Canadian Soo	4
Jan.	8	Pittsburgh	2	Portage Lakes	3
Jan.	11	Canadian Soo	4	Pittsburgh	11
Jan.	12	Michigan Soo	3	Portage Lakes	4
Jan.	13	Canadian Soo	3	Pittsburgh	6
Jan.	13	Michigan Soo	6	Portage Lakes	2
Jan.	16	Michigan Soo	1	Calumet	0
Jan.	16	Canadian Soo	3	Pittsburgh	9
Jan.	22	Portage Lakes	6	Canadian Soo	4
Jan.	23	Pittsburgh	2	Calumet	7
Jan.	24	Portage Lakes	1	Michigan Soo	6
Jan.	24	Calumet	2	Pittsburgh	3
Jan.	25	Portage Lakes	4	Michigan Soo	2
Jan.	26	Pittsburgh	7	Calumet	0
Jan.	29	Pittsburgh	1	Michigan Soo	4
Jan.	31	Pittsburgh	2	Michigan Soo	5
Feb.	2	Pittsburgh	1	Michigan Soo	5
Feb.	3	Pittsburgh	12	Canadian Soo (†)	4
Feb.	6	Portage Lakes	8	Calumet	2
Feb.	6	Michigan Soo	9	Canadian Soo	3
Feb.	8	Michigan Soo	15	Canadian Soo (††)	4
Feb.	8	Portage Lakes	10	Calumet	5
Feb.	13	Calumet	4	Pittsburgh	5
Feb.	13	Portage Lakes	3	Michigan Soo	6
Feb.	15	Calumet	2	Pittsburgh	4
Feb.	17	Calumet	0	Pittsburgh	7
Feb.	21	Michigan Soo	2	Portage Lakes	7
Feb.	26	Calumet	3	Michigan Soo	6
Feb.	27	Michigan Soo	1	Calumet	3
Feb.	27	Portage Lakes	3	Pittsburgh	4
Mar.	1	Portage Lakes	4	Pittsburgh	2
Mar.	4	Portage Lakes	2	Pittsburgh	3
Mar.	5	Calumet	1	Michigan Soo	4
Mar.	8	Portage Lakes	7	Calumet	1
Mar.	11	Portage Lakes	10	Calumet	5

(†) Make up game from December when there was no ice to play on

(††) Canadian Soo folded operations following this game. Remaining games not played were registered as wins for opposing teams. Calumet (3), Michigan Soo (2), Portage Lakes (4), Pittsburgh (0)

Preceded by 1904–05	IPHL seasons 1905–06	Succeeded by 1906–07
