= Herb Clarke (ice hockey) =

Canadian ice hockey player

Herb Clark
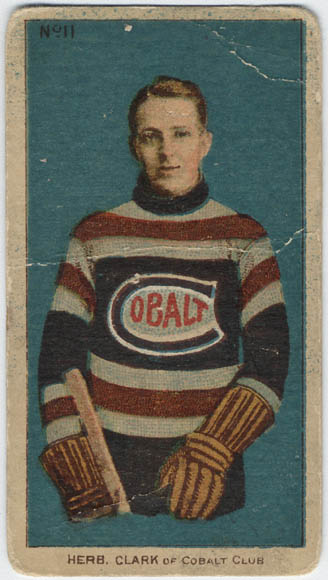
- A trading card featuring Herb Clarke
- Born: September 22, 1887 Kingston, Ontario, Canada
- Died: June 25, 1938 (aged 50) Boston, Massachusetts, U.S.
- Height: 5 ft 11 in (180 cm)
- Weight: 175 lb (79 kg; 12 st 7 lb)
- Position: Center
- Shot: Left
- Played for: Cobalt Silver Kings
- Playing career: 1902–1910

Herbert Secord Clarke (September 22, 1887 – June 25, 1938) was a Canadian professional ice hockey player who played in various professional and amateur leagues, including the National Hockey Association (NHA). Amongst the teams he played with were the Cobalt Silver Kings.

== Career ==
Before turning professional in the TPHL and NHA with the Cobalt Silver Kings Clarke played with the University of Toronto team in the CIAU.

During the 1908–09 season, while with Cobalt, he led the TPHL in scoring alongside Haileybury's Harry Smith with 27 goals. He would finish tied for fifth in scoring during the 1910 NHA season, but retired after the season at an age of 22 despite being pursued by both the Ottawa Senators and Renfrew Creamery Kings for the 1910–11 season.

== Family ==
Herb Clarke was the son of Kingston, Ontario psychiatrist Dr. Charles Kirk Clarke. He died in Boston on June 25, 1938 and was buried in Albany, New York.

== Statistics ==
=== Regular season and playoffs ===
			Regular season					Playoffs
Season	Team	League	GP	G	A	Pts	PIM	GP	G	A	Pts	PIM
1910	Cobalt Silver Kings	NHA	12	20	–	20	27	–	–	–	–	–
