= 1909–10 Montreal Canadiens season =

NHA team season (inaugural season)

1909–10 Montreal Canadiens
- League: 7th NHA
- 1909–10 record: 2–10–0
- Home record: 2–4–0
- Road record: 0–6–0
- Goals for: 59
- Goals against: 100

Team information
- General manager: Jack Laviolette
- Coach: Joseph Cattarinich and Jack Laviolette
- Captain: Newsy Lalonde
- Arena: Jubilee Rink

Team leaders
- Goals: Newsy Lalonde (38)
- Goals against average: Joseph Cattarinich (7.7)

The 1909–10 Montreal Canadiens season was the team's inaugural season and also the first season of the National Hockey Association (NHA). The 1910 Montreal Canadiens operated as 'Les Canadiens' and were owned by Ambrose O'Brien of Renfrew, Ontario, as one of four franchises he owned in the NHA. After the season, the franchise was suspended and a NHA franchise was sold to George Kennedy. All of the players of 'Les Canadiens' went to Kennedy's organization.

== Founding ==
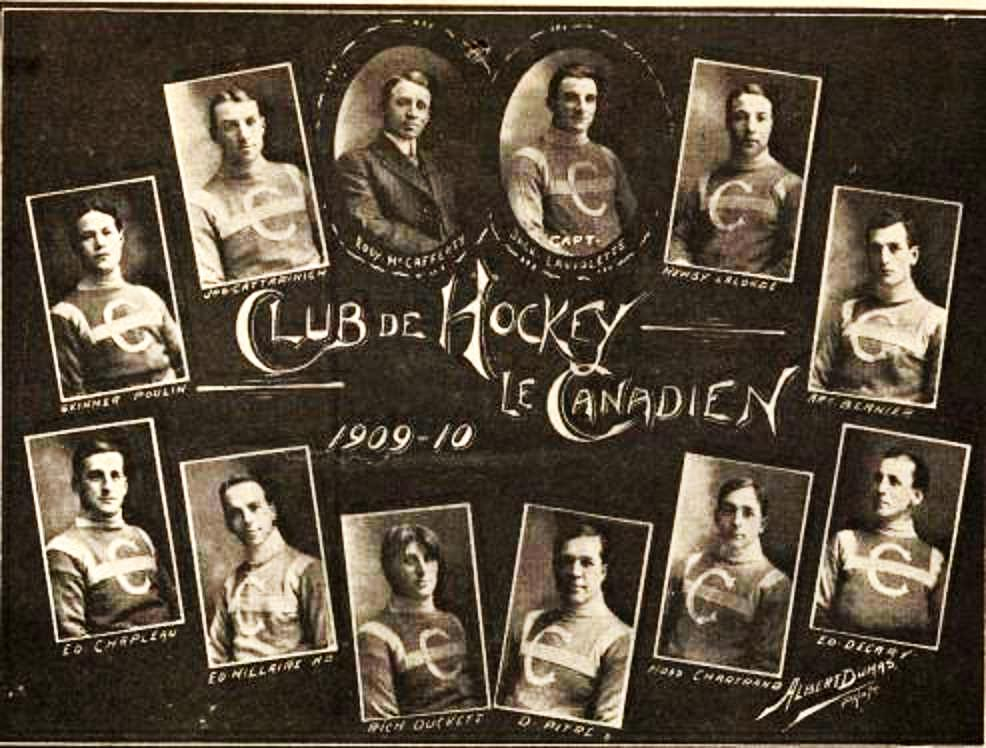
The first team picture

After the Canadian Hockey Association (CHA) turned down Ambrose O'Brien's Renfrew Creamery Kings application for membership on November 25, 1909, O'Brien, along with Jimmy Gardner of the (also rejected) Montreal Wanderers organized the new National Hockey Association. The Wanderers desired a competitor team based in Montreal and Gardner suggested a team of francophone players to O'Brien to play on the rivalry between francophones and anglophones in Montreal. Gardner suggested that it be named 'Les Canadiens.'

The new team was founded at the new NHA's meeting on December 4, 1909. O'Brien put up $5000 security for the new franchise on the "condition that it would be transferred to Montreal French sportsmen as soon as practicable." Jack Laviolette was hired to organize the new team, its official name Le Club de Hockey Le Canadien.

Laviolette was given free rein by the NHA owners to sign all francophone players. The others would not sign any until the Canadien team was set. His first signing was his old friend Didier "Cannonball" Pitre. Pitre was working in Sault Ste. Marie, Ontario, when he received a telegram from Laviolette outlining the team and to come to Montreal. At the train in North Bay, Ontario, Pitre was met by an official of the CHA's Montreal Le National, who signed him on the spot for $1100, however Pitre had thought he was signing a contract with Laviolette. When Pitre arrived in Ottawa, Laviolette was there to meet him. Laviolette explained that it was the other French-Canadian team that Laviolette was managing. Pitre signed with Laviolette for a guaranteed $1700. Before the first game, legal action was initiated by the Nationals and an injunction was only lifted on the day of the first Canadien game. Laviolette's other signings went much more easily. Newsy Lalonde signed on December 14 and he reported the next day to complete the roster.

When the CHA folded in January 1910, the franchise was offered by O'Brien to Le National but they declined to purchase the franchise. The Nationals turned down the offer, not willing to take on the contract to play in the Jubilee Rink, the cost of the player contracts of $6200 and debts of $1400. Le National, an established organization of some 14 years, instead folded their team.

== Regular season ==
The team had a record of 2–10–0 to finish last in the league. The team's first game was a win against Cobalt at home 7–6 in overtime, on January 5, 1910. The result was nullified when the NHA absorbed the CHA teams and created a new schedule. Cobalt later defeated Les Canadiens at Montreal 6–4. The team's first official win took place on February 7, 1910, against the Haileybury Hockey Club. The team did not win a game away from its home rink.

=== Final standings ===
National Hockey Association
	GP	W	L	T	GF	GA
Montreal Wanderers	12	11	1	0	91	41
Ottawa Hockey Club	12	9	3	0	89	66
Renfrew Creamery Kings	12	8	3	1	96	54
Cobalt Silver Kings	12	4	8	0	79	104
Haileybury Hockey Club	12	4	8	0	77	83
Montreal Shamrocks	12	3	8	1	52	95
Les Canadiens	12	2	10	0	59	100

Note: W = Wins, L = Losses, T = Ties, GF= Goals For, GA = Goals Against

== Schedule and results ==
Month	Day	Visitor	Score	Home	Score
Jan.	5	Cobalt	6	Canadiens	7 (5'35" over.)†
Jan.	19	Canadiens	4	Renfrew	9
Jan.	22	Canadiens	4	Ottawa	6
Jan.	26	Ottawa	8	Canadiens	4
Feb.	2	Canadiens	3	Shamrocks	8
Feb.	7	Haileybury	5	Canadiens	9
Feb.	12	Wanderers	9	Canadiens	4
Feb.	15	Renfrew	8	Canadiens	6
Feb.	24	Canadiens	7	Cobalt	11
Feb.	26	Canadiens	3	Haileybury	15
Mar.	5	Cobalt	6	Canadiens	4
Mar.	9	Canadiens	6	Wanderers	11
Mar.	11	Shamrocks	4	Canadiens	5 (12' over.)

† Games played before January 15, which were played before the CHA teams joined were not counted against the final standings.

== Playoffs ==
The team did not qualify for playoffs.

== See also ==
- 1910 NHA season
- History of the Montreal Canadiens
