= Skene Ronan =

Canadian ice hockey player

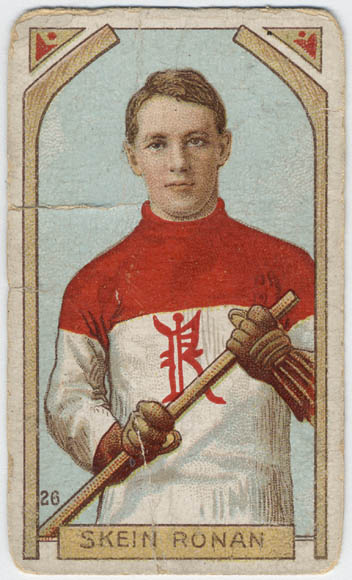
- A cigarette pack hockey card showing Ronan in the Renfrew uniform.
- Born: February 9, 1889 Ottawa, Ontario, Canada
- Died: June 25, 1937 (aged 48)
- Height: 5 ft 6 in (168 cm)
- Weight: 150 lb (68 kg; 10 st 10 lb)
- Position: Defence/Centre
- Shot: Left
- Played for: Ottawa Senators (NHA/NHL); Montreal Canadiens (NHA); Toronto Shamrocks (NHA); Renfrew Creamery Kings (NHA); Haileybury (TPHL/NHA); Toronto Professionals (OPHL); Pittsburgh Bankers (WPHL)
- Playing career: 1908–1919

Erskine Rockcliffe Ronan (February 9, 1889 – June 25, 1937) was a Canadian professional ice hockey player who played 10 professional seasons from 1908 to 1919. Ronan played the majority of his professional career in the National Hockey Association (NHA) and played one season in its successor league, the National Hockey League (NHL) in 1918–19 as a member of the Ottawa Senators. He won the Stanley Cup in 1916 with the Montreal Canadiens. He was born in Ottawa, Ontario.

== Playing career ==
Ronan made his professional debut as a defenceman with the Pittsburgh Bankers of the Western Pennsylvania Hockey League (WPHL) in 1908–09, then would break his contract to leave to play with the Toronto Professionals, finishing with a few games for the Haileybury team in the Temiskaming Professional Hockey League (TPHL). He would stay with Haileybury in 1910 in the inaugural season of the NHA. In 1911, Ronan remained in the NHA after Haileybury returned to the TPHL, as a member of the Renfrew Creamery Kings in their final season in the NHA.

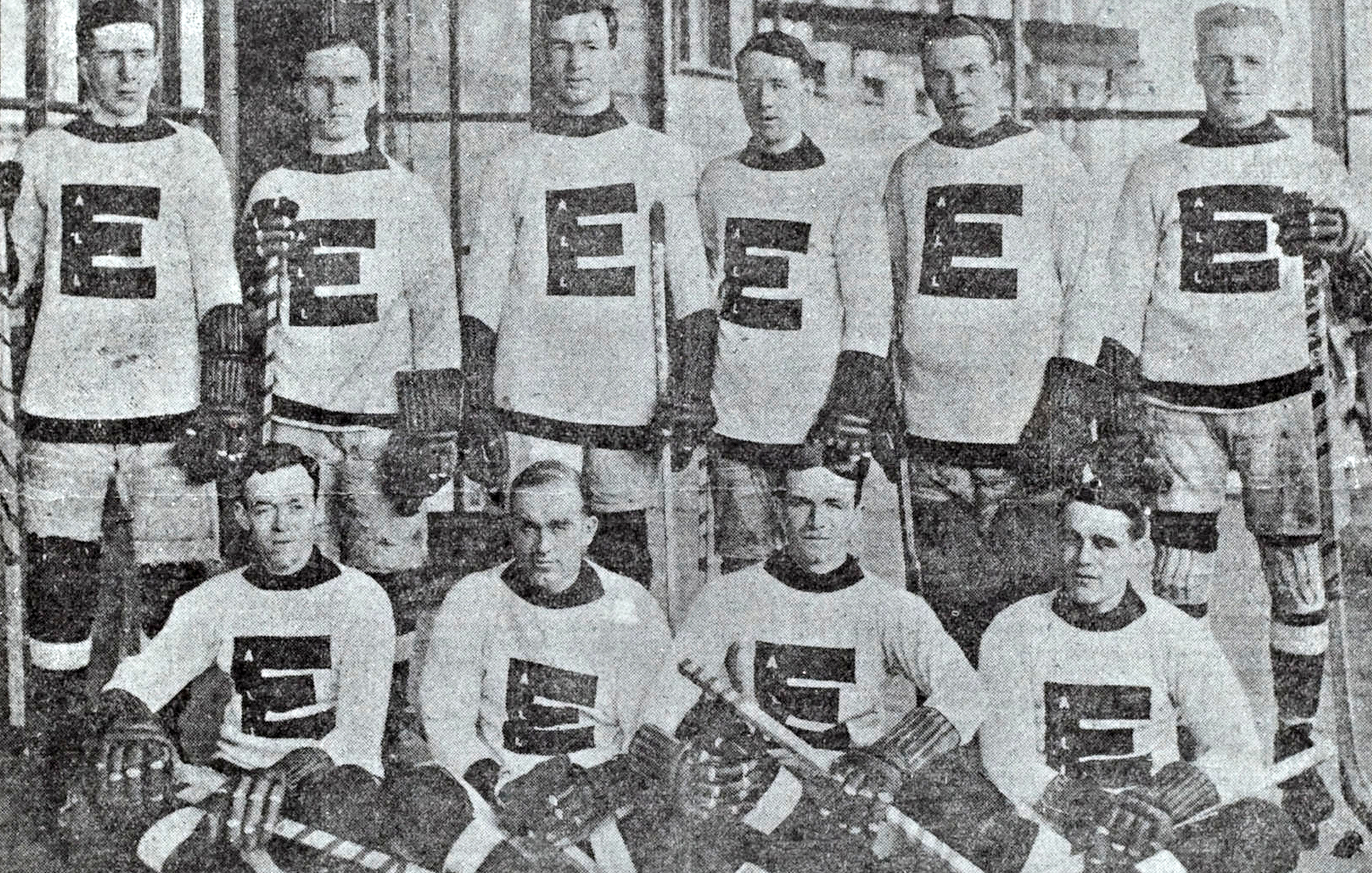
Ronan, third from right in the top row, with the NHA Eastern All-Stars in April 1912.

For the 1911–12 season, Renfrew dropped out of the league and its players were dispersed to the remaining clubs in the league by drawing lots. Ottawa picked Ronan after the Wanderers had picked Cyclone Taylor, and tried to trade Ronan to the Wanderers for Taylor without success. Ottawa's regular centre Marty Walsh was not playing well and Ottawa tried Ronan out at centre. Ronan blossomed at centre, scoring eight goals in one game and five in another, ending up with 35 goals in 18 games.

While a member of the Senators during the 1911–12 and 1912–13 seasons Ronan was also a member of the NHA Eastern All-Stars, managed and coached by Art Ross, who played a series of exhibition games against an All-Star aggregation from the Pacific Coast Hockey Association, scoring a total of 8 goals in 9 games over two years.

Ronan would play two more seasons with Ottawa before being sold to the Toronto Shamrocks before the 1914–15 season but did not duplicate his goal totals.

Ronan played a season and a half with the Shamrocks and the rivaling Toronto club Toronto Blueshirts before being dealt to the Montreal Canadiens, playing on their 1916 Stanley Cup-winning squad, scoring a goal in the deciding game five 2–1 win over the Portland Rosebuds. While with the Canadiens Ronan assaulted former Blueshirts teammate Alf Skinner in a game between the two clubs on January 22, 1916, which had him arrested by police and taken to the Agnes Street station in Toronto, although he was later released on $200 bail. The incident went to trial and Ronan was acquitted of the charge on January 31 before Judge Winchester in Toronto, with Canadiens manager George Kennedy acting as a witness for the defense.

After the 1915–16 season, Ronan signed up with the military where he served until 1918, while being affiliated with the Ottawa Munitions of the Ottawa City Senior Hockey League. He returned to professional hockey and was re-acquired by Ottawa in a trade with the Canadiens in exchange for Harry Hyland. However, he had lost his offensive skills and was released after eleven games without scoring any goals.

== Career statistics ==
=== Regular season and playoffs ===
			Regular season					Playoffs
Season	Team	League	GP	G	A	Pts	PIM	GP	G	A	Pts	PIM
1906–07	Pembroke Lumber Kings	UOVHL	1	1	0	1	0	—	—	—	—	—
1907–08	Ottawa Primrose	OCHL	8	15	0	15	–	—	—	—	—	—
1908–09	Pittsburgh Bankers	WPHL	8	5	0	5	–	—	—	—	—	—
1908–09	Toronto Professionals	OPHL	7	4	0	4	4	—	—	—	—	—
1908–09	Haileybury Hockey Club	TPHL	5	6	0	6	7	2	1	0	1	6
1909–10	Haileybury Comets	NHA	11	3	0	3	21	—	—	—	—	—
1910–11	Renfrew Creamery Kings	NHA	5	3	0	3	9	—	—	—	—	—
1911–12	Ottawa Senators	NHA	18	35	0	35	5	—	—	—	—	—
1912–13	Ottawa Senators	NHA	20	18	0	18	39	—	—	—	—	—
1913–14	Ottawa Senators	NHA	19	18	5	23	65	—	—	—	—	—
1914–15	Toronto Shamrocks	NHA	18	21	4	25	55	—	—	—	—	—
1915–16	Toronto Blueshirts	NHA	9	0	3	3	8	—	—	—	—	—
1915–16	Montreal Canadiens	NHA	8	6	4	10	14	—	—	—	—	—
1915–16	Montreal Canadiens	St-Cup	—	—	—	—	—	2	1	0	1	0
1916–17	Ottawa Munitions	OCHL	—	—	—	—	—	—	—	—	—	—
1917–18	Ottawa Munitions	OCHL	—	—	—	—	—	—	—	—	—	—
1918–19	Ottawa Senators	NHL	11	0	0	0	6	—	—	—	—	—
NHA totals			108	104	16	120	216	—	—	—	—	—
NHL totals			11	0	0	0	6	—	—	—	—	—

== Awards and achievements ==
- 1916 – Stanley Cup champion
