= Barney Gillerain =

Canadian ice hockey player

- Born: May 27, 1887; Brockville, Ontario, Canada
- Died: August 25, 1954 (aged 67)
- Position: Right wing
- Played for: Renfrew Creamery Kings
- Playing career: 1910–1911

Arthur Charles "Barney" Gillerain (May 27, 1887 – August 25, 1954) was a Canadian professional ice hockey player. He played with the Renfrew Creamery Kings of the National Hockey Association.
