= Charles Kirk Clarke =

Canadian psychiatrist (1857–1924)

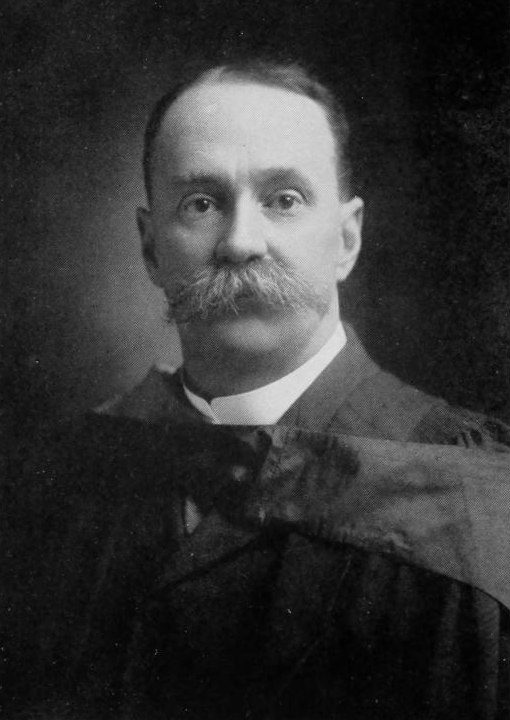
- Photo from 1914 Torontonensis yearbook

Dean of the University of Toronto Faculty of Medicine
- In office 1908 – 1920
- Preceded by: Richard Andrews Reeve
- Succeeded by: Alexander Primrose

Personal details
- Born: Charles Kirk Clarke; 16 February 1857 Elora, Canada West
- Died: 20 January 1924 (aged 66) Toronto, Ontario, Canada
- Occupation: Psychiatrist

Charles Kirk Clarke (16 February 1857 – 20 January 1924) was a psychiatrist who was influential in Canadian politics.

== Early life ==
Clarke was born on 16 February 1857 in Elora, Canada West, son of prominent Ontario parliamentarian Charles Clarke.

== Career ==
Clarke graduated from University of Toronto in 1879 and went on to found the Canadian National Committee for Mental Hygiene (now the Canadian Mental Health Association) in 1914 with Clarence Hincks.

As Dean of the Faculty of Medicine at University of Toronto from 1908 to 1920, he oversaw creation of the Department of Psychiatry, and development of the medical school.

Clarke first practised psychiatry at the 999 Queen Street institution in Toronto, Ontario. In 1880, then took a post at the Hamilton, Ontario asylum.

Clarke was a student and brother-in-law of Joseph Workman, Superintendent of the Toronto Asylum. Clarke was an early proponents of eugenics, emphasizing the importance of restrictive laws that would limit the immigration and marriage of the "mentally defective." To them, such laws seemed necessary to stem the explosive growth of state and provincial mental asylums where foreign-born patients made up more than 50 percent of the hospital population. Further, the growth of hereditarian views in science supported eugenic proposals; psychiatry's desire for greater respectability in the medical profession made eugenic "science" attractive. By 1905, Clarke had abandoned the movement, and many of the other leading psychiatrists would follow suit by the end of World War I, when it was clear that eugenic measures were not having the desired effects.

Clarke joined his other brother-in-law, William Metcalfe at the Rockwood Asylum for the Criminally Insane, the psychiatric hospital in Kingston in 1881 and began a series of reforms in the care of the insane. One of these was freeing patients from confinement. On 13 August 1885, a paranoid patient attacked them both and killed Metcalfe. Clarke survived and succeeded his brother-in-law as Medical superintendent of facility. Clarke carried on in Kingston until 1905 when he succeeded Daniel Clark as superintendent of the Toronto Asylum. In 1911 he resigned from government service and was appointed superintendent of the Toronto General Hospital.

== Family ==
Clarke was married to Margaret DeVeber (from 1880 until her death in 1902) with whom he had four sons and two daughters. Three of his sons were active as ice hockey players on professional or amateur levels in Canada and the United States. Charles Marshall Clarke (1881–1940) played with the Kingston Frontenacs and Queen's University in Kingston, Ontario, and with the New York Athletic Club and New York Wanderers in the AAHL, Harold Metcalfe Clarke (1885–1924) played with the Kingston Frontenacs, University of Toronto, and with the New York Athletic Club, and Herbert Secord Clarke (1887–1938) played with the Kingston Frontenacs, University of Toronto, and with the Cobalt Silver Kings of the National Hockey Association.

From 1904 until his death in 1924 Clarke was married to Theresa Gallagher.

== End of life ==
Clarke became ill in the autumn of 1923 and died in Toronto early the next year. A headline in the Toronto Sunday World of 23 March 1924 read "Canada owes immeasurable debt to Dr. C.K. Clarke who helped to lift the shadow of misery and hopelessness from insane asylums". The Clarke Institute of Psychiatry in Toronto, Ontario, Canada was named in his honour.
