= Billy Baird =

Canadian ice hockey player (1884–1968)

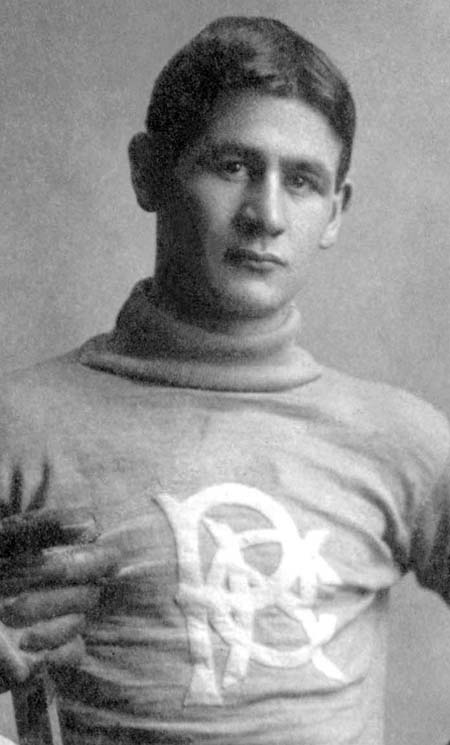
- Baird with the Pittsburgh Professionals in the 1906–07 season.
- Born: March 18, 1884 Ottawa, Ontario, Canada
- Died: December 4, 1968 (aged 84) Ottawa, Ontario, Canada
- Position: Defence
- Played for: Pittsburgh Athletic Club; Pittsburgh Professionals; Ottawa Senators; Portage Plains Cities; Winnipeg Strathconas; Haileybury Comets; Waterloo Colts; Galt Professionals
- Playing career: 1903–1911

William John Baird (March 18, 1884 – December 4, 1968) was a Canadian professional ice hockey player in the early 1900s. He was one of the first professionals in the sport of ice hockey. Born in Ottawa, Ontario, he played for the Ottawa Senators, Haileybury Comets, Pittsburgh Pros, Waterloo Colts and Galt.

== Playing career ==
At the age of 19, Baird first left Ottawa to pursue his hockey career in Pittsburgh, Pennsylvania with the Pittsburgh Athletic Club of the Western Pennsylvania Hockey League (WPHL) in 1903–04. In 1904–05, he joined the Pittsburgh Professionals of the International Hockey League (IHL) for which he played on and off for the next three seasons.

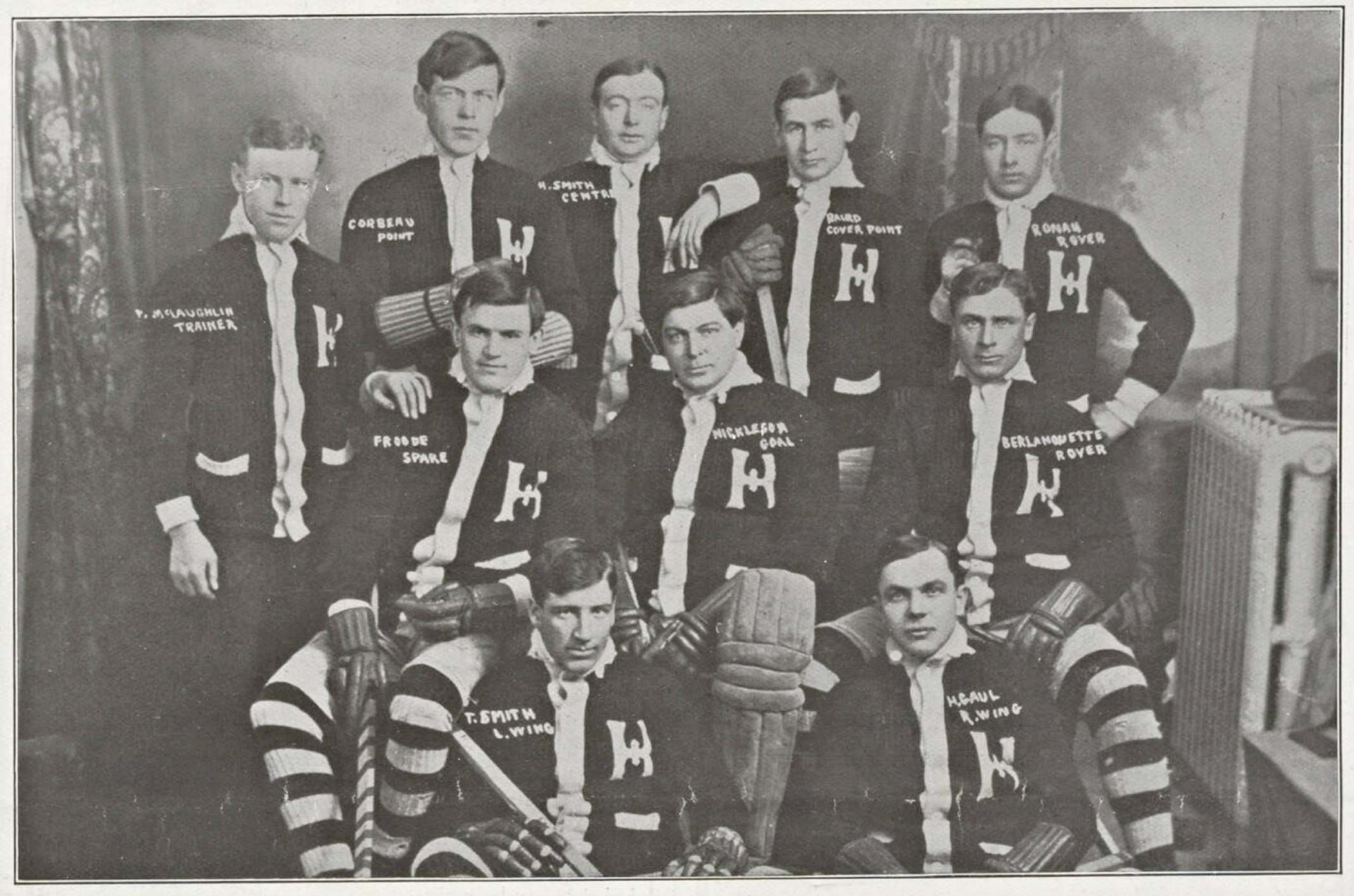
Baird, standing second from right, with Haileybury in 1908–09

Baird played in several cities over the next three seasons, including stops with Portage la Prairie, Manitoba and his hometown with the Ottawa Senators in 1906–07. While with Portage la Prairie he was suspended for professionalism alongside fellow Ottawa player Alwyne "Allan" Kent. In 1907–08, he played the season with the Winnipeg Strathconas of the Manitoba Professional Hockey League (MPHL).

In 1908–09, Baird returned east, playing in Ottawa with the Ottawa Aberdeens and with Haileybury Hockey Club of the Temiscaming Professional Hockey League (TPHL). He played his final two seasons in the Ontario Professional Hockey League, with Waterloo and Galt. While with Galt, he played in their 1911 Stanley Cup challenge against the Senators. He died at an Ottawa hospital on December 4, 1968, and is buried at Pinecrest Cemetery.
