= Charles Spittal =

Canadian athlete and soldier (1874–1931)

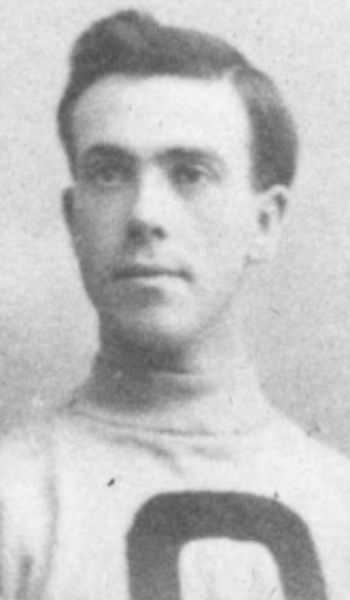
- Spittal with the Ottawa HC in the 1900–01 season.
- Born: November 17, 1874 Ottawa, Ontario, Canada
- Died: January 29, 1931 (aged 56) Montreal, Quebec, Canada
- Height: 5 ft 11 in (180 cm)
- Weight: 147 lb (67 kg; 10 st 7 lb)
- Position: Defence
- Played for: Ottawa Hockey Club; Pittsburgh Victorias; Pittsburgh Professionals; Canadian Soo; Renfrew Creamery Kings
- Playing career: 1896–1908

Charles Douglas "Baldy" Spittal (November 17, 1874–January 29, 1931) was a Canadian athlete and soldier. He was notable as an amateur and professional ice hockey player, and as a competitive marksman with a rifle. He was a member of the 1903 Ottawa Silver Seven Stanley Cup champions. He was one of the first players to play professionally, in Pittsburgh and Sault Ste. Marie, Ontario.

== Personal information ==
Spittal was born in Ottawa, the son of Alexander Spittal and Margaret Moodie. He was educated in Ottawa public schools and the Collegiate Institute. As a youth, he was a competitive cyclist, lacrosse player and ice hockey player. He also was an accomplished marksman with a rifle, competing regularly in competitions from his youth until his death. Spittal later joined the Canadian Army, and briefly served with The 87th Battalion (Canadian Grenadier Guards) CEF including joining as a member of the 87th Battalion Canadian Grenadier Guards Hockey team that was coached by Art Ross, rising to the title of Lieutenant-Colonel. He served during World War I as an officer with the CASC but also was part of the 87th Battalions's advance party under Brigadier General F.S. Meighen in the UK and Europe. He married Helen Taylor and they had a son Taylor Spittal. He died at his home in Montreal and he was interred at Beechwood Cemetery in Ottawa. He was survived by his wife and son, a brother George Spittal of Ottawa, and two sisters Mrs. F. W. C. Cumming of Ottawa and Mrs. T. F. Moneypenny of Toronto.

== Playing career ==
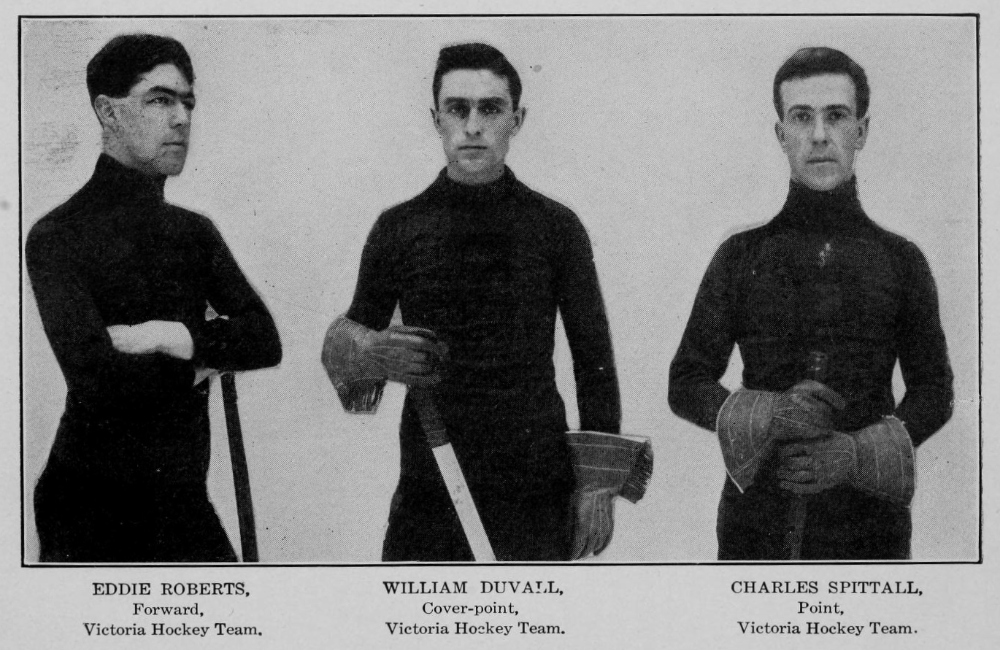
Spittal, at right, with the Pittsburgh Victorias.

Spittal started his senior hockey career with the Ottawa Hockey Club in 1897. He played two full seasons with the club, but was demoted to a spare position in the 1899 season. He played an average of one game per season with Ottawa, playing with other teams, such as Ottawa's second team in the intermediate division. Spittal played one game with Ottawa in the 1903 season but played the majority of the season with the professional Pittsburgh Victorias of the Western Pennsylvania Hockey League (WPHL), which was made up of other Ottawa ice hockey players. He did not play in the Stanley Cup playoff with the Montreal Victorias or the challenge by the Rat Portage Thistles.

In 1903–04 Spittal returned to the Victorias and played in the first "U.S. Professional Championship". He played the next two seasons as a professional in the first fully professional ice hockey league, the International Professional Hockey League, with the Pittsburgh Professionals and the Canadian Soo.

In 1906, Spittal returned to Ottawa, playing two games with the team in the 1906–07 season, as well as Pembroke of the Upper Ottawa Valley Hockey League (UOVHL). In 1908 Spittal played with the Renfrew team of the UOVHL to end his ice hockey playing days.

Spittal was twice arrested for on-ice behaviour. In January 1907, in a game between the Ottawa Hockey Club and the Montreal Wanderers in Montreal, Spittal clubbed down Wanderers Cecil Blachford with a vicious blow the head. His teammates Alf and Harry Smith also clubbed down Hod Stuart and Moose Johnson respectively, and when the Ottawa team returned to Montreal two weeks later all three Ottawa players were arrested by police. Harry Smith was acquitted while Spittal and Alf Smith were each fined $20. In January 1908, Spittal was again placed into custody for knocking out Pembroke player Oren Frood with a blow to the head, while playing for Renfrew of the Upper Ottawa Valley Hockey League.

== Bibliography ==
- Chi-Kit Wong, John (2009). Coast to Coast: Hockey in Canada to the Second World War. University of Toronto Press. ISBN 978-0802095329.
