= Tremaine Kennedy =

Canadian ice hockey player

- Born: January 3, 1888; Moncton, New Brunswick, Canada
- Died: April 13, 1934 (aged 46); Montford Bridge, England, UK
- Height: 5 ft 7 in (170 cm)
- Weight: 150 lb (68 kg; 10 st 10 lb)
- Position: Right wing
- Shot: Right
- Played for: Cobalt Silver Kings
- Playing career: 1910–1911

Tremaine Edward Kennedy (January 3, 1888 – April 13, 1934) was a Canadian professional ice hockey player from Moncton, New Brunswick. He played with the Cobalt Silver Kings of the National Hockey Association, during the league's inaugural season in 1910.
