= Oren Frood =

Canadian ice hockey player

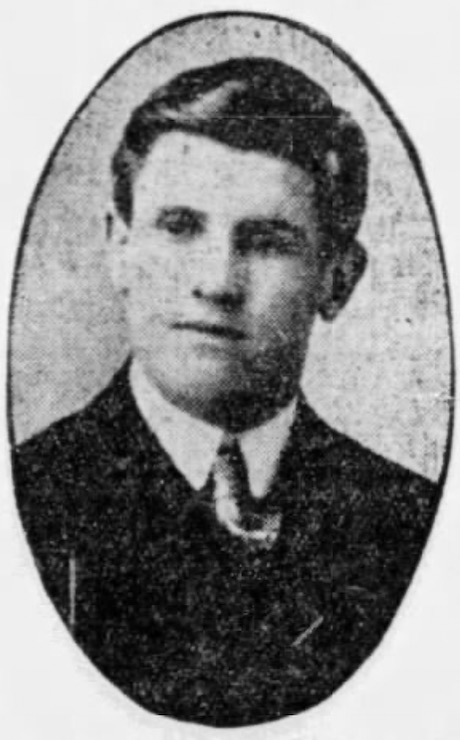
- Born: February 10, 1889 Renfrew, Ontario, Canada
- Died: January 14, 1943 (aged 53)
- Height: 5 ft 9 in (175 cm)
- Weight: 175 lb (79 kg; 12 st 7 lb)
- Position: Left wing
- Shot: Left
- Played for: Renfrew HC; Pembroke HC; Fredericton Capitals; Haileybury Hockey Club; Berlin Dutchmen; Medicine Hat Scoundrels
- Playing career: 1905–1916

Oren Claude Frood (February 10, 1889 – January 14, 1943) was a Canadian professional ice hockey left winger. Frood played as a professional for the Haileybury Hockey Club in the TPHL and the Berlin Dutchmen in the OPHL.

== Playing career ==
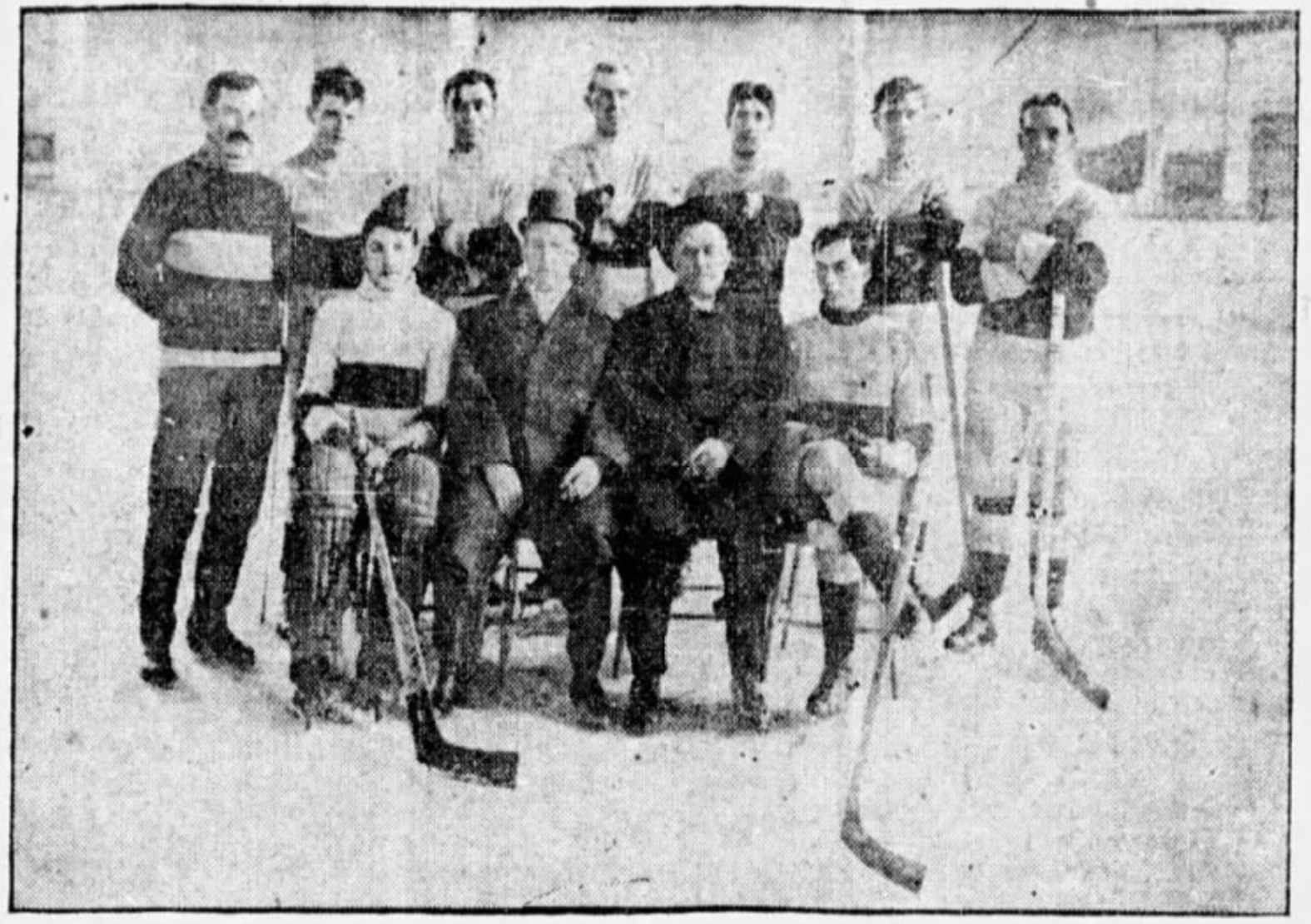
Frood, standing second from left, with the 1909–10 Berlin Dutchmen

Oren Frood began his hockey career with the Pembroke Hockey Club of the Upper Ottawa Valley Hockey League where he played from 1905 to 1908. In 1909, he played with the Haileybury Hockey Club in the Timiskaming Professional Hockey League.

In 1907–08, Frood caused a serious disruption in the New Brunswick Senior Hockey League, having played with the Fredericton Capitals under the assumed identity of "Claude Oren", and winning the league championship. However, the Moncton Victorias protested Frood at the end of the season, and after detectives had been put on the case, and after officials from the Moncton Victorias had travelled to Pembroke to interview and secure an affidavit from Frood that he was indeed Frood and not "Oren", he was deemed a professional and the Fredericton players suspended.

For the 1910 season Frood joined the Berlin Dutchmen of the Ontario Professional Hockey League. Berlin Dutchmen won the league championship in 1910 and in March 1910 the club challenged the Montreal Wanderers, champions of the NHA, for the Stanley Cup. Frood scored a goal in the game but the Montreal club won 7 to 3.

From 1913 to 1916 Frood played with the Medicine Hat Scoundrels of the SAHA. In 1916 he enlisted with the Canadian Army and served in the First World War.

== Bibliography ==
- Slater, Kevin (2010). Trolley League: The Complete History of the Ontario Professional Hockey League 1908-1911.
