= Les Canadiens =

Ice hockey

- Sport: Ice hockey
- Founded: December 1909
- Folded: 1911
- League: National Hockey Association
- Location: Montreal, Quebec, Canada
- Owner: Ambrose O'Brien
- Manager: Jack Laviolette

Les Canadiens was the original name of the Montreal Canadiens professional ice hockey team in the National Hockey Association (NHA), as used in the 1910 season. This was the founding season of the Canadiens hockey club, which now is a franchise member of the National Hockey League (NHL).

== History ==
On the idea of Jimmy Gardner of the Montreal Wanderers, Ambrose O'Brien set up the 'Les Canadiens' club as a francophone team created to attract fans away from the Montreal Le National of the rival Canadian Hockey Association and provide a local rivalry for the Wanderers. To manage the club, Gardner arranged for O'Brien to hire francophone Jack Laviolette who would manage and captain the club in its first season.

=== Transfer to Kennedy ===
Ambrose O'Brien, who owned three other NHA clubs intended from the start that the club would be transferred to "French sportsmen" as soon as possible to operate. The franchise was offered to the Montreal Le National upon the NHA taking in the Ottawa and Shamrocks teams, but Le National declined. One reason offered is that Le National was committed to the Montreal Arena, and Les Canadiens were signed up for the Jubilee Arena.

After the 1910 NHA season, Georges Kennedy of Club Athletique Canadien threatened legal action against the NHA over the use of the 'Canadiens' name. According to Coleman's book, O'Brien granted Kennedy the NHA franchise and assets of the Haileybury Hockey Club for $7,500 and suspended the 'Les Canadiens' franchise. The reason for the transaction being structured this way is not explained. A possible reason is that a Montreal franchise could be worth more in a potential future sale, while Haileybury was exiting the NHA anyway.

According to Andy O'Brien's book, Ambrose O'Brien himself is quoted as saying he sold the Canadiens to Kennedy "too soon", commenting on a 1967 sale of the Canadiens for millions of dollars. Another version of the events, as stated in Holzman's book is that Kennedy received the franchise for free, but had to pay $7,500 for Newsy Lalonde. In Young's biography of Ambrose O'Brien, it is stated that the Canadiens name and players were transferred to Kennedy.

In any event, in the 1910–11 season manager Laviolette and the players of the 'Les Canadiens' team (and none of the Haileybury players) signed up with Kennedy. The Haileybury Hockey Club resumed play in the Temiscaming League.

=== O'Brien's exit ===
According to Coleman (1966), in 1911 O'Brien sold the suspended NHA franchise to Toronto interests who formed the Toronto Blueshirts club, starting play in the NHA in 1912. At the same time, he sold his Cobalt franchise to Quebec interests. In 1912, O'Brien left the hockey business completely, with the sale of the Renfrew Creamery Kings.

== See also ==
- Montreal Canadiens
- National Hockey Association
- 1909–10 Montreal Canadiens season
