= Harry Smith (ice hockey, born 1883) =

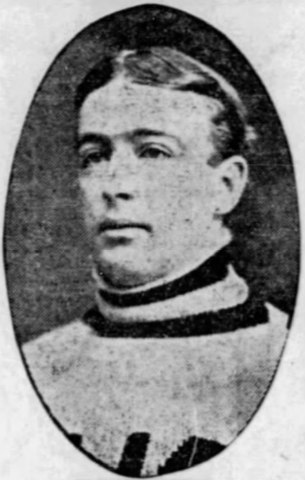
- Harry Smith around 1907.
- Born: December 29, 1883 Ottawa, Ontario, Canada
- Died: May 6, 1953 (aged 69) Ottawa, Ontario, Canada
- Height: 5 ft 5 in (165 cm)
- Weight: 165 lb (75 kg; 11 st 11 lb)
- Position: Centre
- Shot: Left
- Played for: Halifax Crescents; Ottawa Senators; Toronto Tecumsehs; Waterloo Colts; Cobalt Silver Kings; Haileybury Comets; Montreal Wanderers; Toronto Pros; Pittsburgh Bankers; Winnipeg Maple Leafs
- Playing career: 1905–1914

Henry James Smith (December 29, 1883 – May 6, 1953) was a Canadian professional ice hockey player who played 98 games in various professional and amateur leagues, including the National Hockey Association and Eastern Canada Amateur Hockey Association. Among the teams he played with were the Cobalt Silver Kings, Toronto Tecumsehs, Ottawa Senators, and Montreal Wanderers. He was a member of the famous "Ottawa Silver Seven" from 1905 to 1907. His brothers Alf and Tommy also played ice hockey.

== Playing career ==
Harry Smith first played senior-level hockey with the Ottawa Aberdeens of the CAHL-Intermediate league in 1901. He played for Arnprior of the Upper Ottawa Valley Hockey League before joining Smiths Falls of the Southern Ontario Hockey Association. He played two seasons with Smiths Falls before returning home to play in Ottawa with the Ottawa Senators, already the Stanley Cup champion. He played two seasons with the Silver Seven with his brother Alf who was playing-coach. In the 1905–06 season, Alf, Harry and brother Tommy all played for the Silver Seven, occasionally playing together on one line.

Smith was known as a rough player. In 1907 Smith and teammates Alf Smith and Charles Spittal were charged with assault after beating Montreal Wanderers players Hod Stuart, Ernie "Moose" Johnson and Cecil Blachford with their sticks. Harry Smith was acquitted while Spittal and Alf Smith were each fined $20. When Smith played in an exhibition game with the Winnipeg Maple Leafs against the Winnipeg Hockey Club on December 19, 1907, the Winnipeg Hockey Club players refused to carry on the contest after it had degenerated into a number of violent displays, the last of which involved blows between Harry Smith and Winnipeg Hockey Club defenseman Percy Browne. He was subsequently expelled from the MHA along with Maple Leafs teammate Joe Hall.

Smith was also known to have one of the better shots in the game during his era, which helped him score many goals.

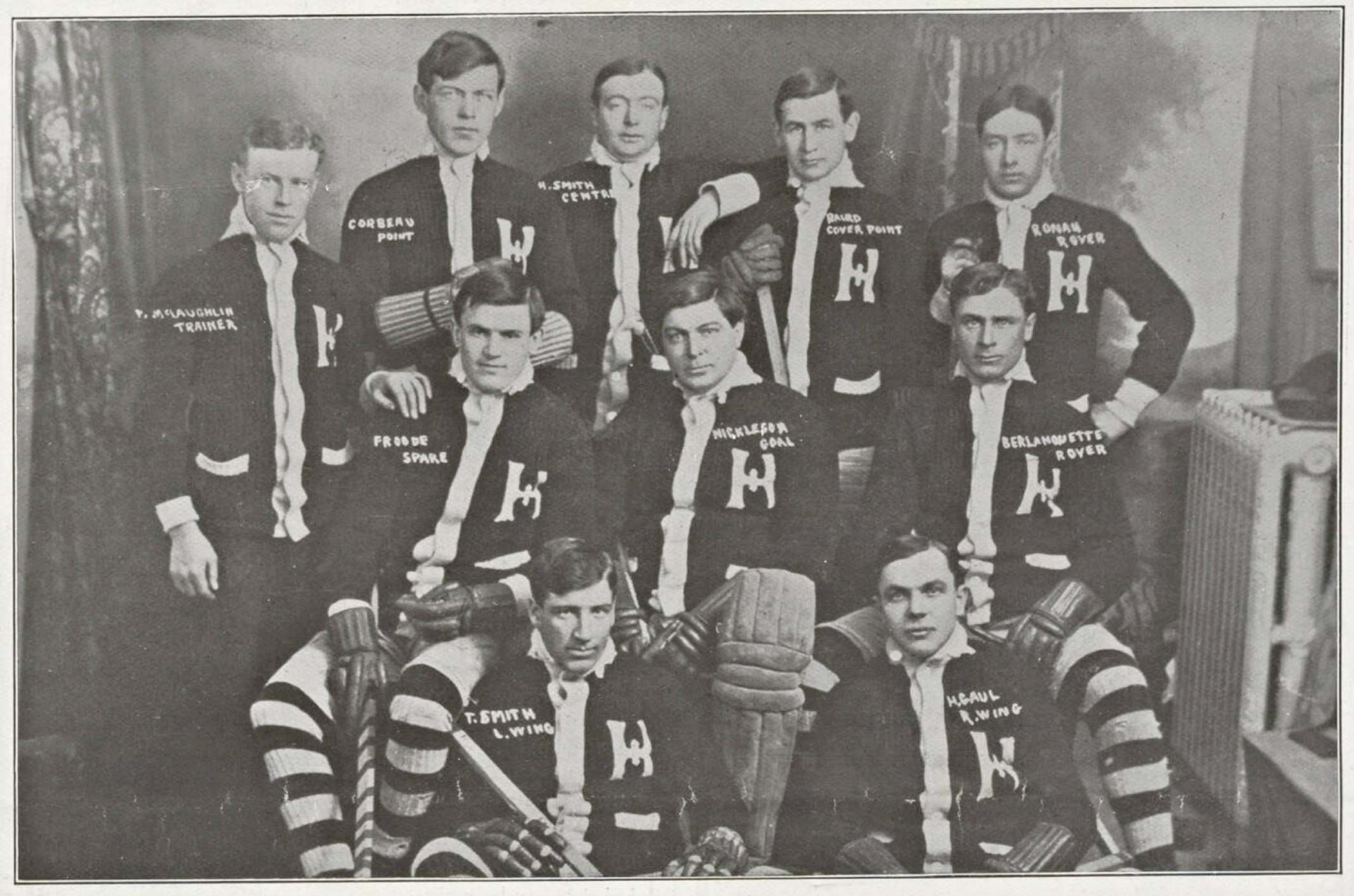
Smith (center back row) with Haileybury HC in 1908–09. Younger brother Tommy is seated bottom left.

He became a professional player in 1907–08 with the Pittsburgh Bankers of the Western Pennsylvania Hockey League (WPHL). On February 15, 1908, he was involved in a riot with spectators in a game against the Pittsburgh Athletic Club at the Duquesne Garden where he went into the stands swinging his stick after he had been hit on the ice by a chair thrown by a spectator. In 1908–09 he was a 'for hire' player playing for the Bankers, Toronto Pros (OPHL), Haileybury Comets (TPHL) and Montreal Wanderers (ECHA), where he was member of the Wanderers 1909 Stanley Cup challenge championship squad, although the team did not hold the Cup at the end of the season.

In December 1909, prior to the 1909–10 season, Smith was badly scalded on one if his legs by the bursting of a valve in a steam engine while working for his father Henry in Fort William. He was laid up in hospital for several days, and it was first thought that he would not be able to play any hockey during the season, but he did play later on for both the Cobalt Silver Kings and the Haileybury Comets in the National Hockey Association.

He moved on to the Waterloo Colts of the OPHL in 1911, the Schreiber Colts in 1912, before returning to the NHA with the Toronto Tecumsehs. He returned to Ottawa in 1913–14, playing two games with the Ottawa Hockey Club (now known as the Senators) before ending his career with the Halifax Crescents of the Maritime Professional Hockey League (MPHL).

He died at Ottawa in 1953.

== Statistics ==
			Regular season					Playoffs
Season	Team	League	GP	G	A	Pts	PIM	GP	G	A	Pts	PIM
1902–03	Ottawa Aberdeens	CAHL-I	–	–	–	–	–	2	2	0	2	–
1903–04	Arnprior HC	UOVHL	6	23	0	23	–	–	–	–	–	–
1904–05	Cornwall HC	FAHL	1	0	0	0	–	–	–	–	–	–
	Smiths Falls HC	OHA	3	8	0	8	12	2	5	0	5	7
	Smiths Falls HC	Prov. Playoffs	–	–	–	–	–	4	5	0	5	25
1905–06	Ottawa Senators	ECAHA	8	31	1	32	29	–	–	–	–	–
		Stanley Cup	–	–	–	–	–	5	15	0	15	21
1906–07	Ottawa Senators	ECAHA	9	22	3	25	56	–	–	–	–	–
		Exh.	1	4	–	4	–	–	–	–	–	–
1907–08	Winnipeg Maple Leafs	Exh.	3	6	–	6	–	–	–	–	–	–
1907–08	Pittsburgh Bankers	WPHL	16	44	–	44	–	–	–	–	–	–
		World Pro	–	–	–	–	–	3	4	–	4	–
1908–09	Pittsburgh Bankers	WPHL	7	14	0	14	–	–	–	–	–	–
	Montreal Canadian Rubber	MMfHL	1	1	0	1	8	–	–	–	–	–
	Haileybury Hockey Club	TPHL	8	27	0	27	12	2	2	0	2	15
	Toronto Professionals	OPHL	2	0	0	0	0	–	–	–	–	–
	Montreal Wanderers	ECHA	4	9	2	11	29	–	–	–	–	–
	Montreal Wanderers	Stanley Cup	–	–	–	–	–	2	5	0	5	3
1910	Cobalt Silver Kings	NHA	10	28	0	28	26	–	–	–	–	–
	Haileybury Hockey Club	NHA	3	4	0	4	0	–	–	–	–	–
1910–11	Waterloo Colts	OPHL	13	20	0	20	–	–	–	–	–	–
	Cobalt Silver Kings	TPHL	1	1	0	1	0	–	–	–	–	–
1911–12	Schreiber Colts	NOHL	13	32	0	32	30	–	–	–	–	–
1912–13	Toronto Tecumsehs	NHA	15	14	2	16	40	–	–	–	–	–
1913–14	Ottawa Senators	NHA	3	1	0	1	7	–	–	–	–	–
ECAHA/ECHA totals			21	62	6	68	114	–	–	–	–	–
WPHL totals			23	58	0	58	–	–	–	–	–	–
NHA totals			31	47	2	49	73	–	–	–	–	–
Stanley Cup totals			–	–	–	–	–	7	20	0	20	24

Statistics per Society for International Hockey Research at sihrhockey.org

== See also ==
- 1905–06 FAHL season
