= Bruce Ridpath =

Canadian ice hockey player and general manager

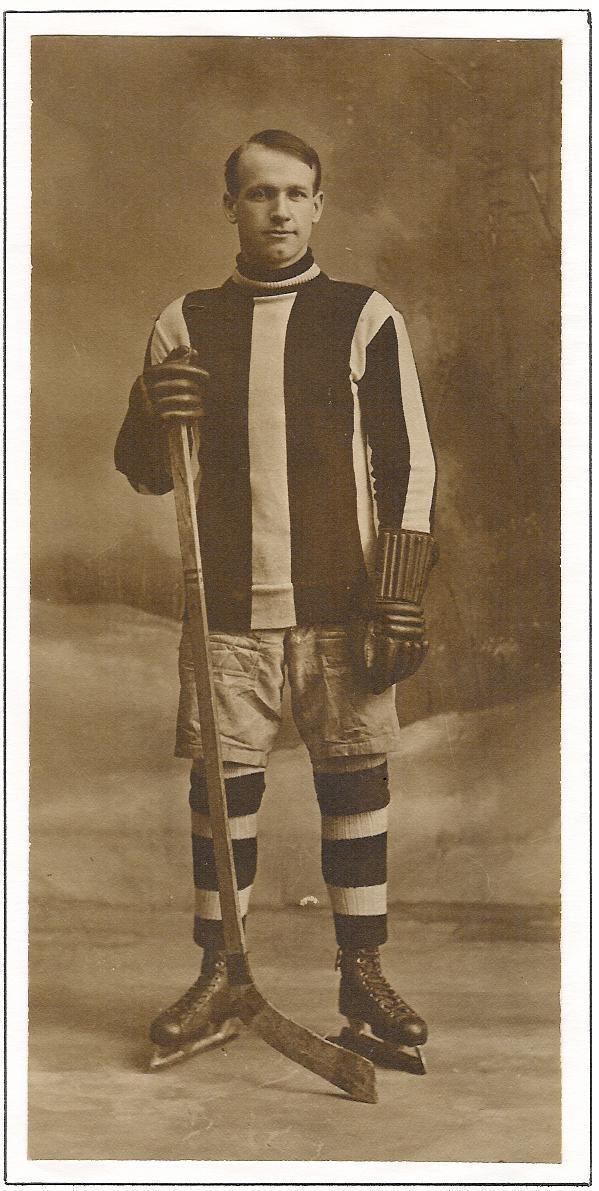
- Born: January 2, 1884 Lakefield, Ontario, Canada
- Died: June 4, 1925 (aged 41) Toronto, Ontario, Canada
- Height: 5 ft 8 in (173 cm)
- Weight: 160 lb (73 kg; 11 st 6 lb)
- Position: Winger
- Shot: Right
- Played for: Ottawa Senators; Toronto Professionals; Toronto Marlboros
- Playing career: 1906–1911

David Bruce Ridpath (January 2, 1884 – June 4, 1925) was a Canadian professional ice hockey player and general manager. He was a member of the 1911 Stanley Cup champion Ottawa Senators before an automobile accident ended his playing career.

Ridpath, born in Lakefield, Ontario, as well as playing ice hockey, also was a member of the Toronto Canoe Club and became known as a canoe racer and stunt paddler, performing in shows in Great Britain, Germany and Spain. Ridpath never married and died in 1925 at the age of 41 at St. Michael's Hospital in Toronto. He suffered a stroke on May 18 and never regained consciousness.

== Playing career ==
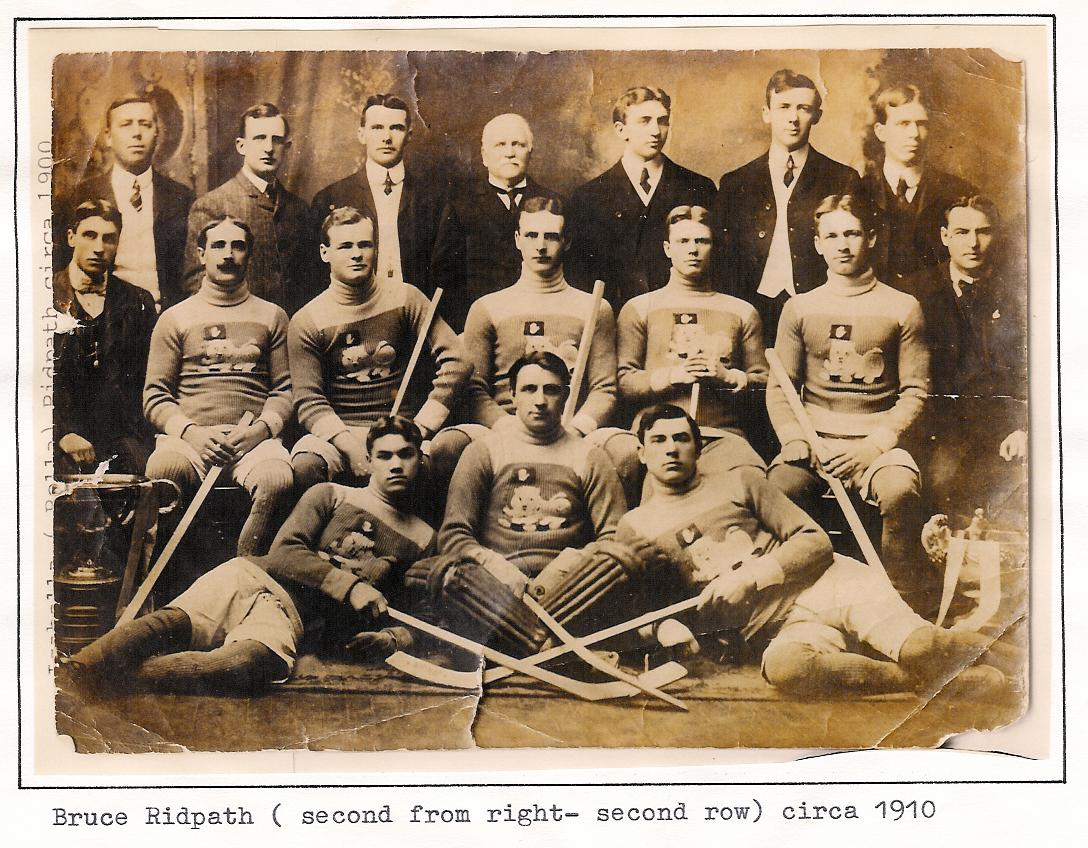
Bruce Ridpath, at the right in the middle row, with the Toronto Marlboros c. 1905.

Bruce Ridpath played junior hockey in 1904 with the Westerns (representing Parkdale, Toronto) in the Ontario Hockey Association (OHA). As a senior, he joined the Toronto Marlboros of the OHA in 1905. In the season of 1905–06, Ridpath secretly played for money in the Temiskaming League. His appearance in the league was found out, and he was banned from the OHA in November 1906. He subsequently helped to found the Toronto Pros team and was their initial captain. He played in eight games, scoring 17 goals in the Pros' exhibition schedule during the 1906–07 season. He played three seasons for the Torontos, helping the team to win the 1908 OPHL league title and scored a goal in a 6-4 loss to the Montreal Wanderers in a one-game Stanley Cup challenge. On January 30, 1909, he scored seven goals in one game as Toronto defeated Brantford Indians 15-10. Later that season, he played for Cobalt in the Temiskaming League that would form the foundation of the new National Hockey Association (NHA) later that year.

Ridpath signed with the Ottawa Senators in 1909–10, playing in the NHA. He played on a forward line with Gordon Roberts and Marty Walsh and rover Bruce Stuart and later with the line of Walsh, Dubbie Kerr and Jack Darragh. In 1910–11, his most productive season, he scored 23 goals in 16 games and help Ottawa win the NHA final and the Stanley Cup.

Ridpath suffered a fractured skull when he was hit by a car on Yonge Street in Toronto on November 2, 1911, and missed the entire 1911–12 season. The new Toronto Blueshirts wanted him to play for them, and Ottawa demanded $500 for his rights, but he never fully recovered from his injuries, which were initially life-threatening, ending his playing career. Benefits were held in Ottawa and Toronto for Ridpath, who was a popular player.

"A most peculiar thing about it is that not only do I not remember anything about the accident, but I have lost all recollection of the events for three weeks preceding it. I feel fine and if I can play next season I will, but if I find that I cannot play as well as I want to, I will drop out. I have been engaged to manage the Toronto team in the National Hockey [A]ssociation next season. The games will be played in the new Mutual rink on artificial ice."

— Bruce Ridpath in July 1912, talking to the Calgary Herald about his accident and future prospects.

Ridpath was appointed the first manager of the Blueshirts and assembled the Toronto Blueshirts for their first season of play in the NHA. He resigned as manager in October 1913. He was considering playing for the team, but his sight was not good enough to play. His hearing had also been impaired as a result of the accident.

== Statistics ==
			Regular season					Playoffs
Season	Team	League	GP	G	A	Pts	PIM	GP	G	A	Pts	PIM
1908	Toronto Pros	OPHL	12	8	0	8	42	–	–	–	–	–
		Stanley Cup	–	–	–	–	–	1	1	0	1	0
1909	Toronto Pros	OPHL	11	21	0	21	11	–	–	–	–	–
	Cobalt Silver Kings	TPHL	2	6	0	6	4	2	3	0	3	3
1909–10	Ottawa Senators	CHA	2	3	0	3	0	–	–	–	–	–
1910	Ottawa Senators	NHA	12	16	2	18	32	–	–	–	–	–
		Stanley Cup	–	–	–	–	–	4	6	0	6	–
1910–11	Ottawa Senators	NHA	16	23	0	23	51	–	–	–	–	–
		Stanley Cup	–	–	–	–	–	2	4	0	4	–
NHA totals			28	39	2	41	83	–	–	–	–	–
Stanley Cup totals			–	–	–	–	–	7	11	0	11	–

Statistics from sihrhockey.org

== See also ==
- 1911–12 NHA season
