= 1910–11 NHA season =

Ice hockey season

- League: National Hockey Association
- Sport: Ice hockey
- Duration: December 31, 1910 – March 10, 1911
- Games: 16
- Teams: 5

Regular season
- Top scorer: Marty Walsh (35)

O'Brien Cup
- Champions: Ottawa Hockey Club
- Runners-up: Montreal Canadiens

NHA seasons
- ← 1910 1911–12 →

The 1910–11 NHA season was the second season of the now defunct National Hockey Association. The Ottawa Hockey Club won the league championship. Ottawa took over the Stanley Cup from the Montreal Wanderers and defended it against teams from Galt, Ontario, and Port Arthur, Ontario.

== League business ==
The annual meeting was held November 12, 1910, electing the following executive:

- Emmett Quinn (president and secretary)

Directors:

- Eddie McCafferty, Wanderers
- John Ambrose O'Brien, Renfrew
- W. P. Humphrey, Shamrocks
- George Kennedy, Canadiens
- Joe Power, Quebec

The Shamrocks resigned from the league and were not replaced. The Club Athletique-Canadien and the Quebec Hockey Club were granted franchises. Haileybury and Cobalt left the league. Club-Athletique-Canadien had made a claim on the Canadiens name and threatened a lawsuit if they were not granted a franchise. There are three written descriptions of this transaction. Coleman(1966) writes that George Kennedy, president of the CAC bought the Haileybury franchise. In Andy O'Brien's book, Ambrose O'Brien is quoted as saying that he sold the Canadiens to Kennedy. In Holzman's book, the franchise was given to Kennedy, but Kennedy had to pay O'Brien for the rights to Newsy Lalonde. In The Globe of March 7, 1911, it is claimed that Lalonde's sale was the first ever sale of a player.

The NHA decided to impose a $5,000 per team salary cap.

A second meeting, on November 26, 1910, updated the Board of Directors to:

- D'Arcy McGee, Ottawa
- James A. Barnett, Renfrew
- Adolphe Lecours, Canadiens
- Joe Power, Quebec
- Eddie McCafferty, Wanderers

The salary cap, while opposed by the players was upheld at the meeting.

Source: Coleman, p. 201–203.

=== Salary cap ===
The salary cap of $5,000 per club caused a situation where Bruce Stuart of Ottawa threatened a mass defection to a new league. However, the players found that the Arena Company, owners of the Montreal Arena would not rent to the players. There was no other suitable arena in Montreal available for a new league and the players had no choice but to abandon the effort. Some players took a large cut in salary: Marty Walsh, Fred Lake and Dubbie Kerr were paid $600 each where they had been paid $1,200 each in 1910. The dispute caused the cancellation of a pre-season exhibition series in New York for the Ottawas and Wanderers.

=== Rule changes ===
Games were changed from two periods of 30 minutes, to three periods of twenty minutes, with ten-minute rest periods. The Spalding hockey puck was adopted as the standard puck.

== Regular season ==
=== Final standing ===
Note GP = Games Played, W = Wins, L = Losses, T = Ties, GF = Goals For, GA = Goals Against

Team	GP	W	L	T	GF	GA
Ottawa Hockey Club	16	13	3	0	122	69
Montreal Canadiens	16	8	8	0	66	62
Renfrew Creamery Kings	16	8	8	0	91	101
Montreal Wanderers	16	7	9	0	73	88
Quebec Hockey Club	16	4	12	0	65	97

=== Results ===
Month	Day	Visitor	Score	Home	Score
Dec.	31	Ottawa HC	5	Canadiens	3
Jan.	2	Renfrew	2	Quebec HC	3
Jan.	4†	Wanderers	4	Renfrew	2
Jan.	7	Canadiens	4	Quebec HC	1
Jan.	7	Wanderers	5	Ottawa HC	10
Jan.	10	Quebec HC	4	Wanderers	5 (OT)
Jan.	10	Ottawa HC	5	Renfrew	4
Jan.	14	Renfrew	1	Canadiens	4
Jan.	14	Quebec HC	5	Ottawa HC	13
Jan.	16	Quebec HC	5	Renfrew	10
Jan.	18	Canadiens	4	Wanderers	5
Jan.	21	Canadiens	4	Ottawa HC	5 (OT)
Jan.	21	Wanderers	5	Quebec HC	3
Jan.	24	Renfrew	5	Ottawa HC	19
Jan.	24	Quebec HC	5	Canadiens	9
Jan.	27	Canadiens	6	Renfrew	5
Jan.	28	Ottawa HC	8	Wanderers	2
Feb.	1	Renfrew	8	Quebec HC	7
Feb.	1	Wanderers	6	Canadiens	3
Feb.	3	Wanderers	5	Renfrew	8
Feb.	4	Ottawa HC	6	Quebec HC	4
Feb.	7	Canadiens	9	Wanderers	2
Feb.	11	Quebec HC	2	Canadiens	3
Feb.	11	Wanderers	4	Ottawa HC	9
Feb.	15‡	Wanderers	4	Renfrew	5
Feb.	15	Canadiens	4	Quebec HC	7
Feb.	18	Renfrew	4	Wanderers	6
Feb.	18	Ottawa HC	7	Quebec HC	2
Feb.	21	Renfrew	2	Canadiens	4
Feb.	22	Wanderers	3	Quebec HC	1
Feb.	24	Ottawa HC	7	Renfrew	8
Feb.	25	Quebec HC	3	Wanderers	2
Feb.	27	Quebec HC	11	Renfrew	10
Feb.	28	Wanderers	2	Canadiens	3
Feb.	28	Quebec HC	2	Ottawa HC	6
Mar.	2	Ottawa HC	7	Wanderers	11
Mar.	2	Canadiens	3	Renfrew	5
Mar.	4	Renfrew	7	Ottawa HC	6
Mar.	7	Wanderers	6	Renfrew	7
Mar.	8	Ottawa HC	4	Canadiens	3
Mar.	10	Canadiens	0	Ottawa HC	5

† Protested by Renfrew.

‡ Replay of protested game. Played at Ottawa

== Player statistics ==
=== Scoring leaders ===
Note: GP = Games played, G = Goals scored, PIM = Penalties in minutes

Name	Club	GP	G	PIM
Marty Walsh	Ottawa HC	16	35	51
Dubbie Kerr	Ottawa HC	16	33	45
Don Smith	Renfrew	16	26	49
Bruce Ridpath	Ottawa HC	16	23	51
Odie Cleghorn	Renfrew	16	20	66
Newsy Lalonde	Canadiens	16	19	63
Didier Pitre	Canadiens	16	19	22
Ernie Russell	Wanderers	11	18	26
Jack Darragh	Ottawa HC	16	18	36
Frank Glass	Wanderers	16	17	31

=== Goaltending averages ===
Note: GP = Games played, GA = Goals against, SO = Shutouts, GAA = Goals against average

Name	Club	GP	GA	SO	GAA
Georges Vezina	Canadiens	16	62	0	3.9
Percy LeSueur	Ottawa HC	16	69	1	4.3
Riley Hern	Wanderers	16	88	0	5.5
Paddy Moran	Quebec HC	16	97	0	6.1
Bert Lindsay	Renfrew	16	101	0	6.3

== Stanley Cup challenges ==
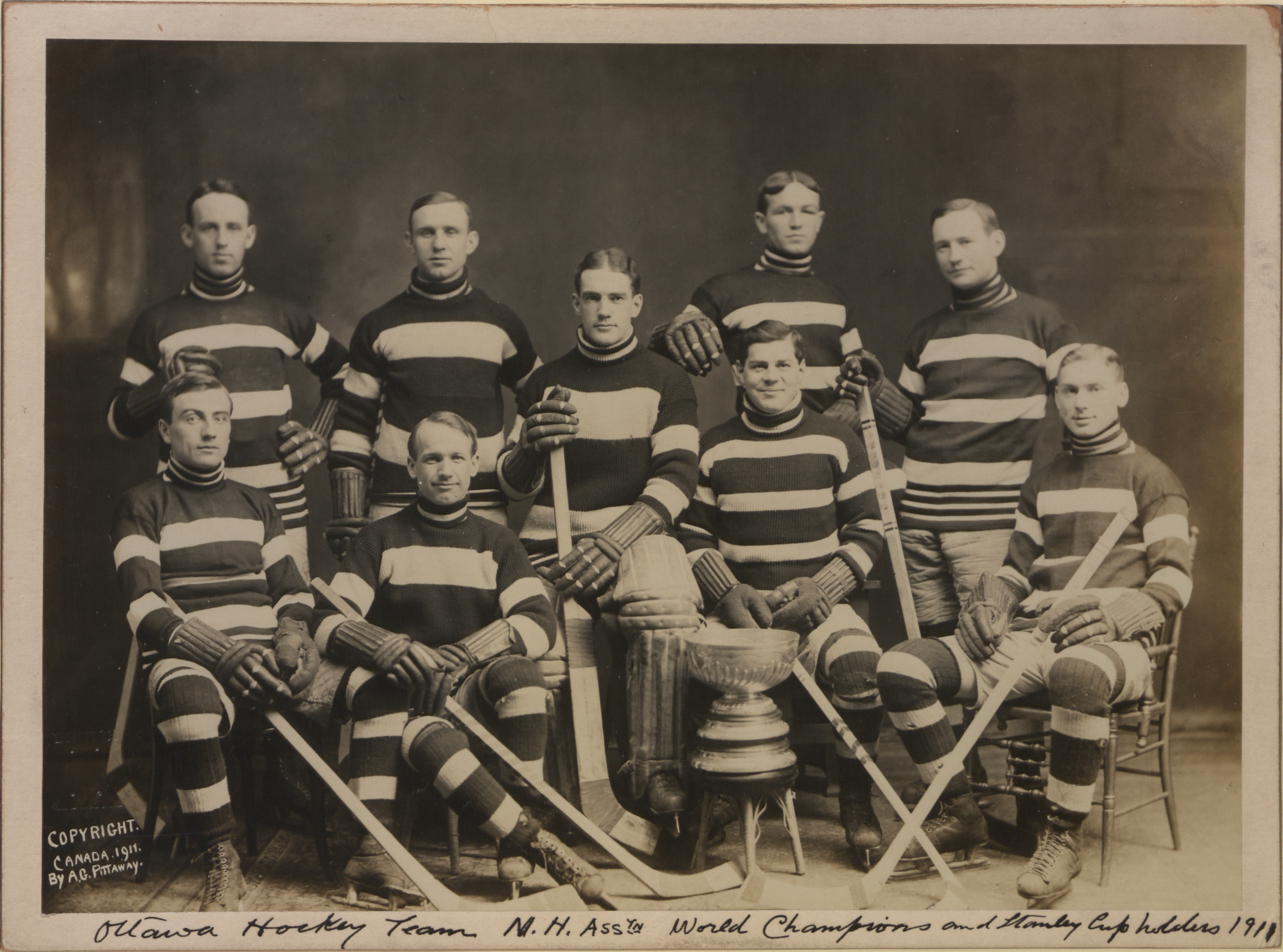
The Ottawa team, 1911 Stanley Cup winners

Ottawa played two challenges after the season at The Arena in Ottawa.

=== Galt vs. Ottawa ===
March 13, 1911
Galt	4		Ottawa	7
Billy Hague		G	Percy LeSueur	
Billy Baird		P	Fred Lake	1
Rastus Murphy		CP	Hamilton Hamby Shore	
Tommy Smith Capt.	1	RO	Jack Darragh	
Jim Mallen		C	Marty Walsh	3
Louis Berlinguette	2	RW	Bruce Ridpath	2
Fred Doherty	1	LW	Albert Kerr	1

=== Port Arthur vs. Ottawa ===
Marty Walsh was a "one-man wrecking crew", scoring ten goals against Port Arthur.

March 16, 1911
Port Arthur	4		Ottawa	13
Herman Zeigler		G	Percy LeSueur	
Paddy McDonough		P	Fred Lake	
Eddie Carpenter	1	CP	Hamilton Hamby Shore	
Jack Walker	1	RO	Jack Darragh	
Mickey O'Leary		C	Marty Walsh	10
Willard McGregor	1	RW	Bruce Ridpath	2
Wes Wellington	1	LW	Albert Kerr	1

== Post-season exhibition series ==
After the season a series was arranged between Renfrew and Montreal Wanderers and Ottawa to play in New York. Renfrew and Montreal played first, with the winner to play-off against Ottawa. After the Wanderers defeated Renfrew 18–5 (13–4, 4–1), Ottawa won a $2,500 prize for the two-game series winning 12–7 ( 7–2, 5–8 ).

Ottawa and Montreal then played a two-game series in Boston on March 22 and March 25, 1911 (the first game being the first professional hockey game in Boston). Ottawa won a $2,500 purse by a total score of 13–11 (5–7, 8–4). Ottawa had picked up Cyclone Taylor from Renfrew to play in the Boston exhibition games.

Date	Winning Team	Score	Losing Team	Location
March 17, 1911	Montreal Wanderers	14–4	Renfrew	St. Nicholas Rink, New York
March 18, 1911	Montreal Wanderers	4–1	Renfrew	St. Nicholas Rink, New York
March 20, 1911	Ottawa	7–2	Montreal Wanderers	St. Nicholas Rink, New York
March 21, 1911	Montreal Wanderers	8–5	Ottawa	St. Nicholas Rink, New York
March 22, 1911	Montreal Wanderers	7–5	Ottawa	Boston Arena, Massachusetts
March 25, 1911	Ottawa	8–4	Montreal Wanderers	Boston Arena, Massachusetts

Sources

- "WANDERERS AGAIN DOWN THE RENFREWS; Montreal Skaters Capture the Second Game of Canadian Hockey at Rink". New York Times. March 19, 1911. p. S2.
- "OTTAWA HOCKEY CLUB DOWNS WANDERERS; Stanley Cup Winners Show High Class Team Work and Skating at Local Rink". New York Times. March 21, 1911. p. 12.
- "OTTAWA TEAM WINS $2,500 HOCKEY PURSE; Wanderers of Montreal Beaten in Final Game of Four Nights' Carnival". New York Times. March 22, 1911. p. 12.

== Stanley Cup engraving ==
The 1911 Stanley Cup was presented by the trophy's trustee William Foran. The Ottawa Hockey Club never did engrave their names on the Cup for their championship season.

1910–11 Ottawa Hockey Club
Players
Forwards
Jack Darragh(rover)
Bruce Stuart(rover-Captain)
Marty Walsh (center)
Bruce Ridpath (right wing)
Albert "Dubbie" Kerr (left wing)
Horace Gaul † (center)
Defencemen
Alex Currie (cover point-point)
Hanilton Hamby Shore (cover point)
Fred Lake (point)
Goaltender
Percy LeSueur

† Missing from the team picture. These are the known non-playing members of the 1911 Ottawa Hockey Club. The only team picture found of the Ottawa Hockey Club in 1911 includes 9 of the 10 players and no non-playing members.

non-players =

- Thomas D'Arcy McGee† (President), Llewellyn Bates† (Vice President)
- Pete Green† (Coach), Patrick Baskerville† (Treasurer)
- Martin Rosenthal† (Secretary), Mac McGilton† (Trainer)
- George Bryson†, Fred Carling†, Charles Irvin† (Directors)
- Dave Mulligan†, Charles Sparks† (Directors)

engraving-notes =

- Ottawa put their names on the cup in 1909 and 1910, but did not in 1911. It was not until the trophy was redesigned in 1948 that the words "1911 Ottawa Senators" were put onto its then-new collar.

== See also ==
- National Hockey Association
- List of pre-NHL seasons
- List of Stanley Cup champions
- 1910 in sports
- 1911 in sports

Preceded by Montreal Wanderers; March 1910	Ottawa Hockey Club; Stanley Cup Champions; 1911	Succeeded by Quebec Bulldogs; 1912
Preceded by 1910 NHA season	NHA seasons 1910–11	Succeeded by 1911–12 NHA season
