= Timiskaming Professional Hockey League =

Professional ice hockey league in Ontario, Canada

- Sport: Ice hockey
- Founded: 1906
- First season: 1906
- Folded: 1911
- No. of teams: 4
- Country: Canada
- Last champion: Cobalt Silver Kings

The Timiskaming Professional Hockey League (TPHL) was a minor professional ice hockey league based in the area of Lake Timiskaming, Canada. Founded in 1906, the league is notable for providing teams and Ambrose O'Brien, a founder of the National Hockey Association and the founding owner of the Montreal Canadiens.

== History ==
The league was founded in the early 1900s in the mining towns of Northern Ontario, Canada. Owned by wealthy mine owners, the league paid its players, one of the few leagues to do so at the time. The games between teams served as the basis for high-stakes gambling between the owners, players and the public. 'Ringers' from the southern ice hockey leagues would be paid to join the teams for a single game, hoping to garner large gambling profits for the team owners.

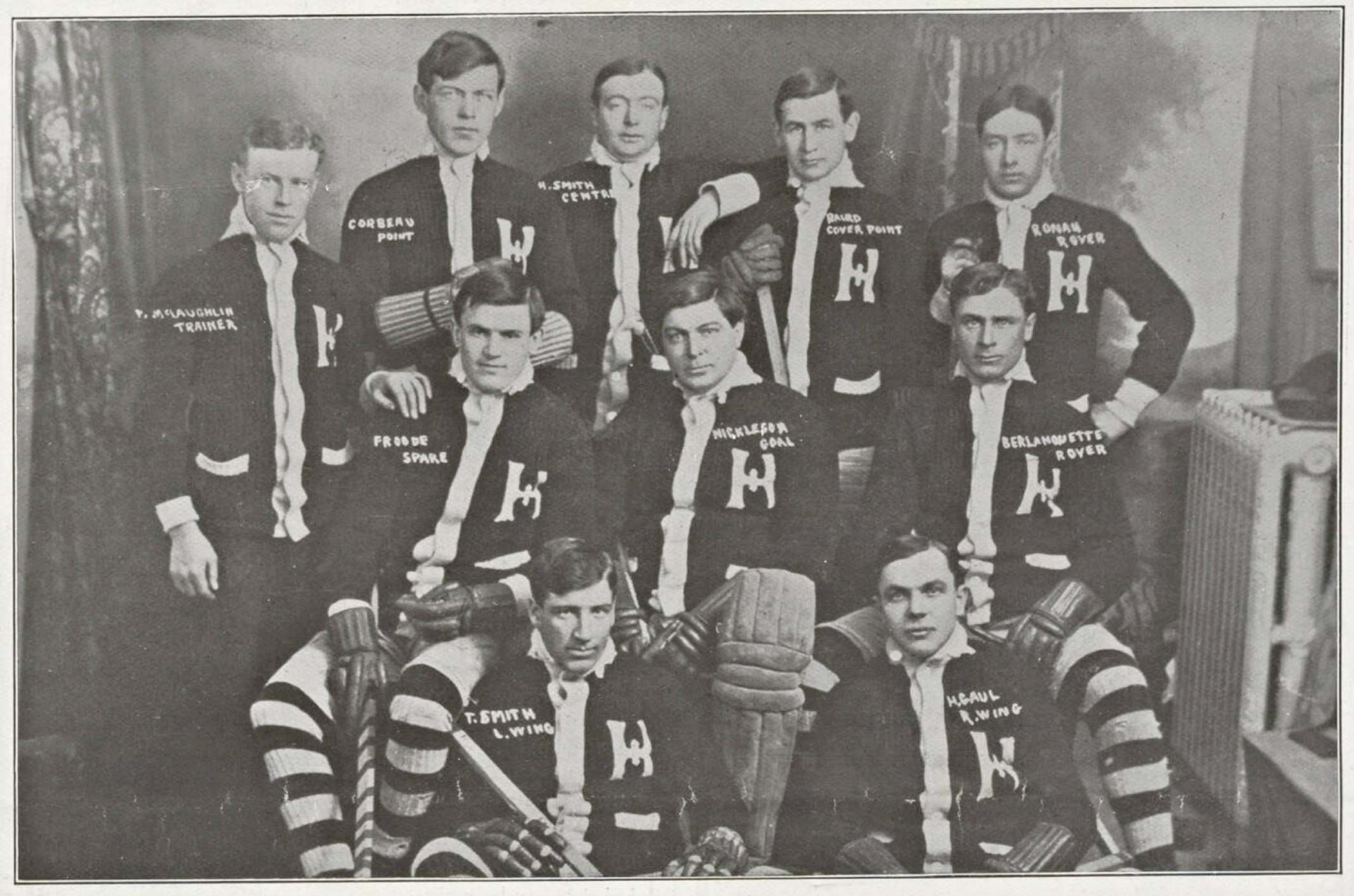
Haileybury HC, 1908–09 season.

In a 1909 game between Haileybury and Cobalt at Cobalt, over $10,000 was in the pot in bets. Haileybury won 6–5 in overtime, with five of the six goals scored by Harry Smith who had been lured from the Montreal Wanderers of the Eastern Canada Hockey Association.

The use of 'ringers' had one negative effect on the league. The league challenged for the Stanley Cup twice in 1909 and was rejected twice by the Stanley Cup trustees because of the 'ineligible' players on Cobalt, the 1909 champion. The trustees implemented a rule that players had to be a member of the team at the start of season, set at January 2.

Just before the 1910 season, the league dissolved so that two of its teams, Cobalt and Haileybury would help to form the National Hockey Association. The owner of the two teams Ambrose O'Brien, along with his family's money financed four teams in the NHA, including the Renfrew Millionaires and the Montreal Canadiens, then known as 'Les Canadiens'. In 1910, after their NHA franchises were dealt away, the TPHL resumed play and Cobalt and Haileybury returned to the league for the 1910–11 season before ending operations.

== Teams ==
- Cobalt Silver Kings – 1906–1911
- Haileybury Comets – 1906–1911
- New Liskeard, Ontario – 1906–07
- Latchford, Ontario – 1906–07
- North Bay, Ontario – 1910–11

== Notable players ==
These may have been 'ringers' imported for single games:

- Ed Decarie – Cobalt 1906–07
- Newsy Lalonde – Cobalt 1906–07, Haileybury 1907–08
- Bert Lindsay – Latchford 1906–07
- Hugh Lehman – Cobalt 1906–07
- Didier Pitre – Cobalt 1906–07
- Bruce Ridpath – Cobalt 1906–07, 1908–09
- Bobby Rowe – Latchford 1906–07, Haileybury 1908–09
- Art Ross – Cobalt 1908–09
- Harry Smith – Haileybury 1908–09
- Tommy Smith – Haileybury 1908–09

== See also ==
- Ambrose O'Brien
