= Ed Decarie =

Canadian ice hockey player

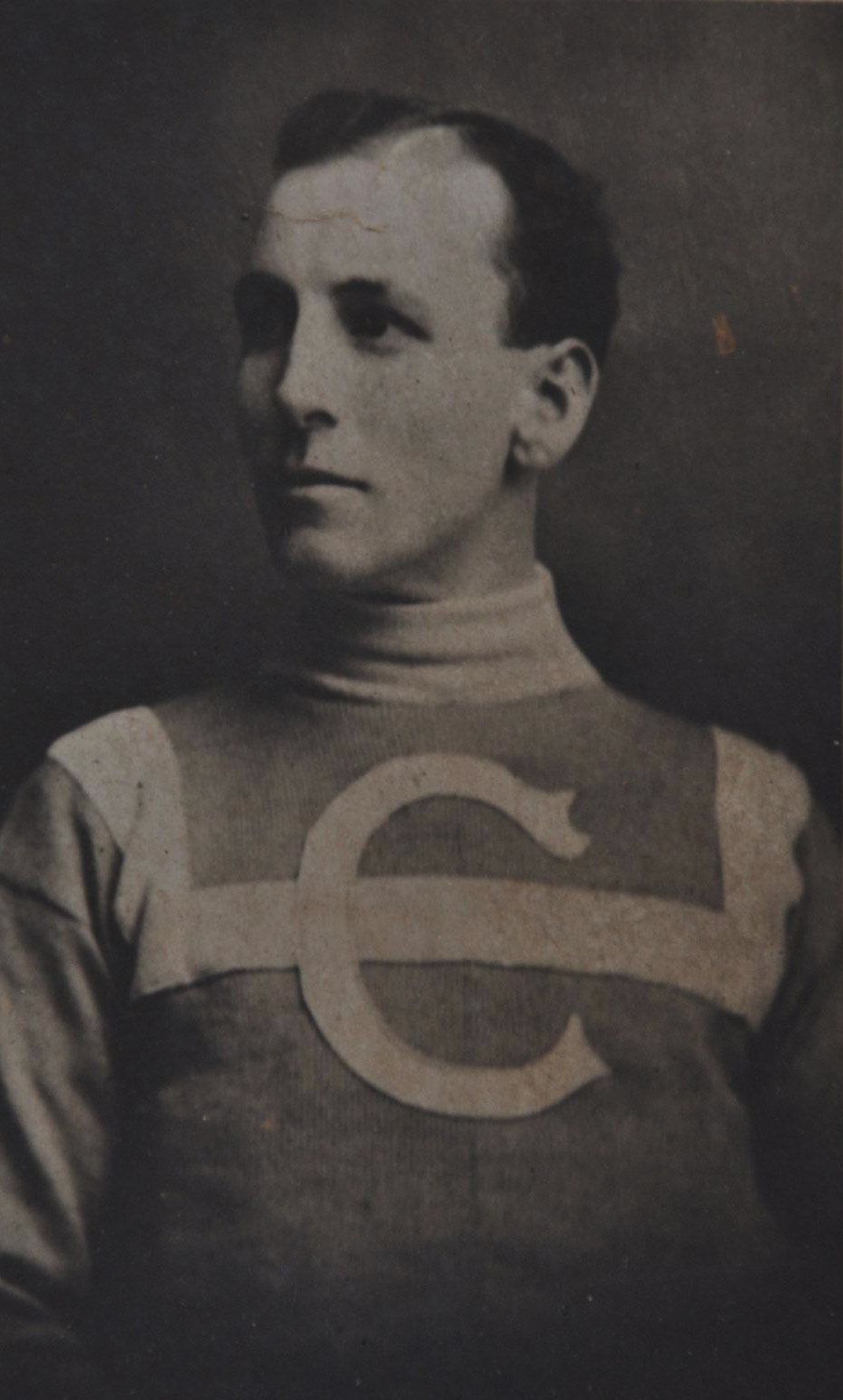
- Born: August 8, 1883; Hawkesbury, Ontario, Canada
- Died: February 1, 1942 (aged 58); Hull, Quebec, Canada
- Height: 5 ft 10 in (178 cm)
- Weight: 185 lb (84 kg; 13 st 3 lb)
- Position: Centre
- Shot: Left
- Played for: Canadian Soo; Calumet Miners; Pittsburgh Athletic Club; Montreal Canadiens; Brantford Indians
- Playing career: 1902–1911

Edmond Julien Decarie (August 8, 1883 – February 1, 1942) was a Canadian professional ice hockey player from Hawkesbury, Ontario. He played with the Montreal Canadiens of the National Hockey Association during the 1910 season.

He also played with the Canadian Soo and Calumet Miners of the International Professional Hockey League (IPHL), with the Pittsburgh Athletic Club of the Western Pennsylvania Hockey League (WPHL), and with the Brantford Indians of the Ontario Professional Hockey League (OPHL).
