= Haileybury Comets =

Haileybury Hockey Club
- Founded: 1906
- History: 1906–1909 (TPHL); 1909–1910 (NHA); 1910–1911 (TPHL); 1911–1915 (TSL)
- Home arena: Cobalt-Haileybury Curling Club Curling Rink
- City: Haileybury, Ontario
- Team colours: Maroon, white
- Head coach: Weldy Young

The Haileybury Hockey Club (also known as the Haileybury Comets or Haileybury Miners) were an ice hockey based in Haileybury, Ontario, which existed from 1906 to 1915. The team is notable for being a founding member of the National Hockey Association (NHA), the predecessor to the National Hockey League (NHL). Established to capitalize on the then-current mining boom in northern Ontario, it became clear that the town was too small to support major professional ice hockey, and the team left the NHA after its inaugural season.

== History ==
The Haileybury club was founded in 1906 as one of the teams of the Timiskaming Professional Hockey League (TPHL), a collection of teams sponsored by local mine owners. The club was owned by the O'Brien family, based in Renfrew, Ontario which owned silver mines, railways and railway construction companies. The TPHL existed as entertainment for the miners in the remote towns of northern Ontario, the teams playthings for the owners to bet extravagantly on.

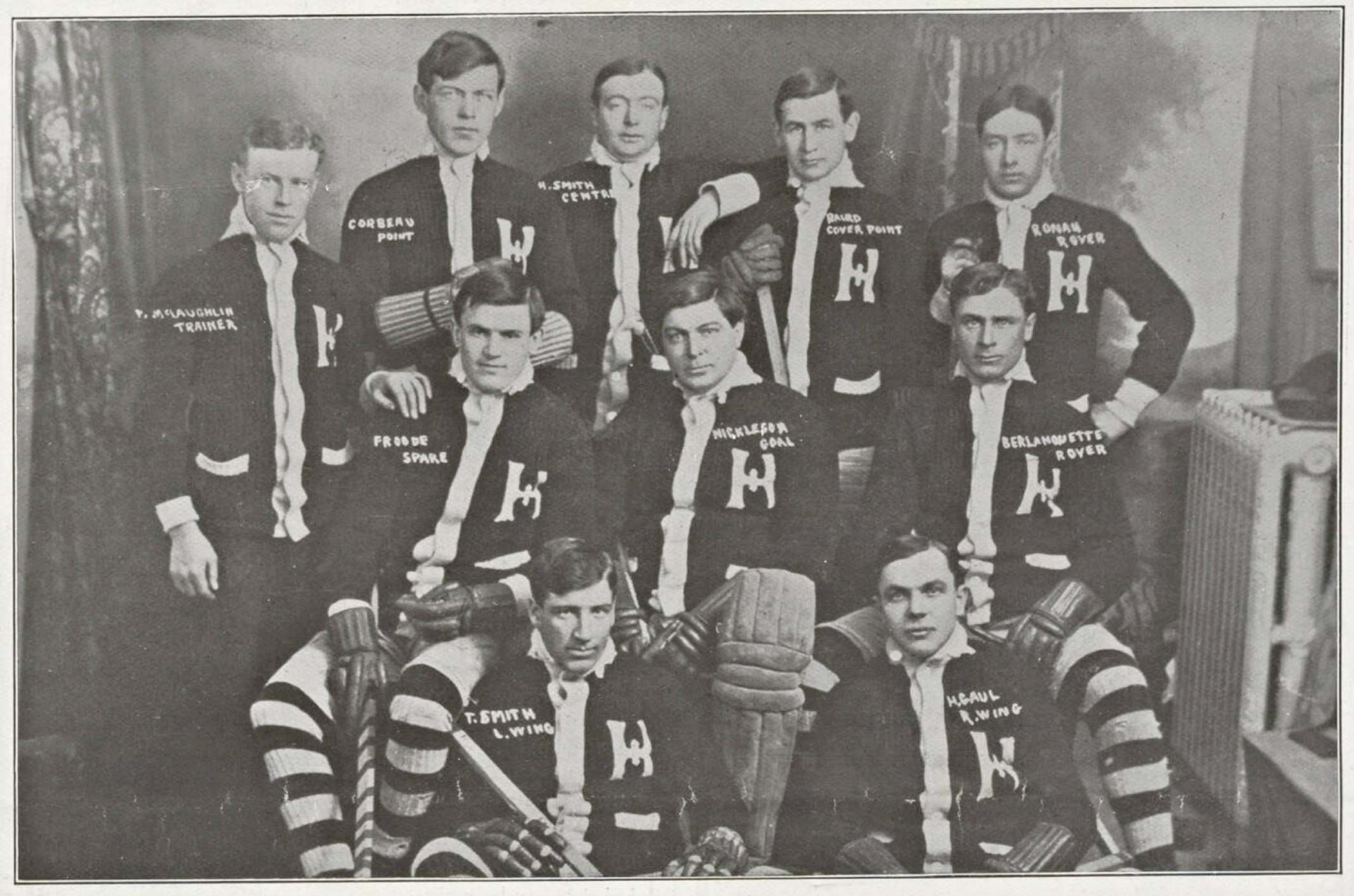
Haileybury HC, 1908–09 season.

In 1909, Haileybury earned notoriety in ice hockey circles, luring professional players such as Con Corbeau, Skene Ronan and Harry Smith away from teams in the Ontario Professional Hockey League (OPHL) and the Eastern Canadian Amateur Hockey Association (ECHA). At the time, mine owners made large wagers on the play of the teams in the league and O'Brien could afford to entice players to break contracts and join Haileybury.

When the Federal League Renfrew Creamery Kings team failed to join the new Canadian Hockey Association (CHA) in November 1909, Ambrose O'Brien organized the National Hockey Association and included Haileybury and his other TPHL team the Cobalt Silver Kings in the league, along with the Montreal Wanderers, Les Canadiens and Renfrew, which he had to buy so as to enter the team in the NHA.

In 1910, Haileybury's one season in the NHA, their record was four wins and eight losses, scoring 77 goals for and 83 goals against. Notable players included Alex Currie, Art Ross, Paddy Moran and Skene Ronan. Haileybury's leading scorer was Horace Gaul with 22 goals, good for seventh in the NHA that season.

After the 1910 season, the club's owner, Renfrew mining tycoon Ambrose O'Brien withdrew Haileybury from the NHA. The TPHL was resurrected and Haileybury resumed play in the TPHL for the 1910–11 season, the final season of the TPHL, afterwards continuing in the Timiskaming Senior League until 1915.

The Haileybury NHA franchise itself was transferred to Montreal wrestler and sports promoter George Kennedy, owner of the "Club Athlétique Canadien", who took over the Montreal Canadiens ice hockey club. Kennedy claimed rights to the "Canadiens" name and threatened to sue O'Brien over the use of the name by O'Brien's 'Les Canadiens' club. In an unusual settlement, Kennedy took over the Haileybury franchise rather than the Canadiens franchise and O'Brien kept the Montreal franchise. The Les Canadiens players and name were transferred to Kennedy.
