= Ambrose O'Brien =

Canadian industrialist and sports team owner

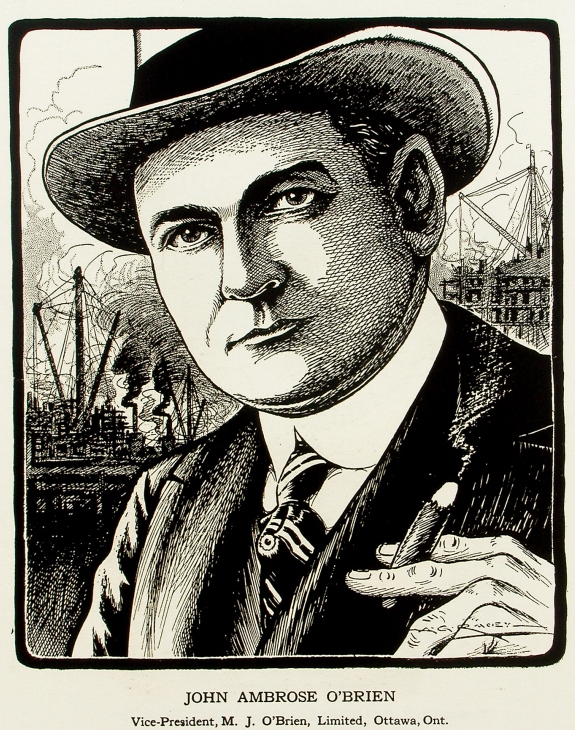
- O'Brien in a 1922 illustration
- Born: John Ambrose O'Brien; May 27, 1885; Renfrew, Ontario, Canada
- Died: April 24, 1968 (aged 82)
- Occupations: Industrialist; Ice hockey magnate
- Awards: Hockey Hall of Fame (1962)

John Ambrose O'Brien (May 27, 1885 – April 24, 1968) was a Canadian industrialist and sports team owner. He was a founder of the National Hockey Association (NHA), owner of the Renfrew Millionaires and the founding owner of the Montreal Canadiens professional ice hockey team.

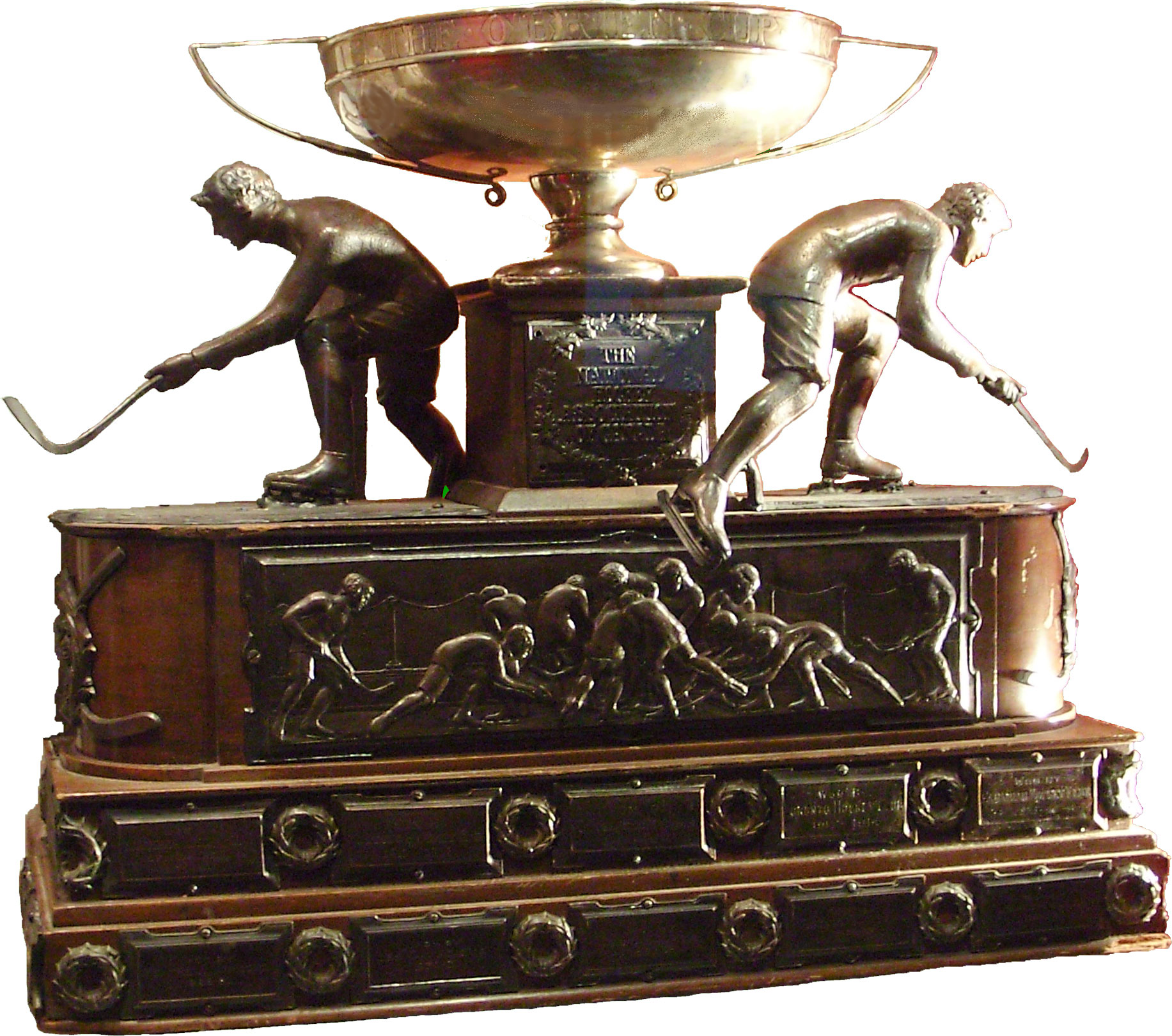
NHA O'Brien Cup, awarded 1910 - 1950.

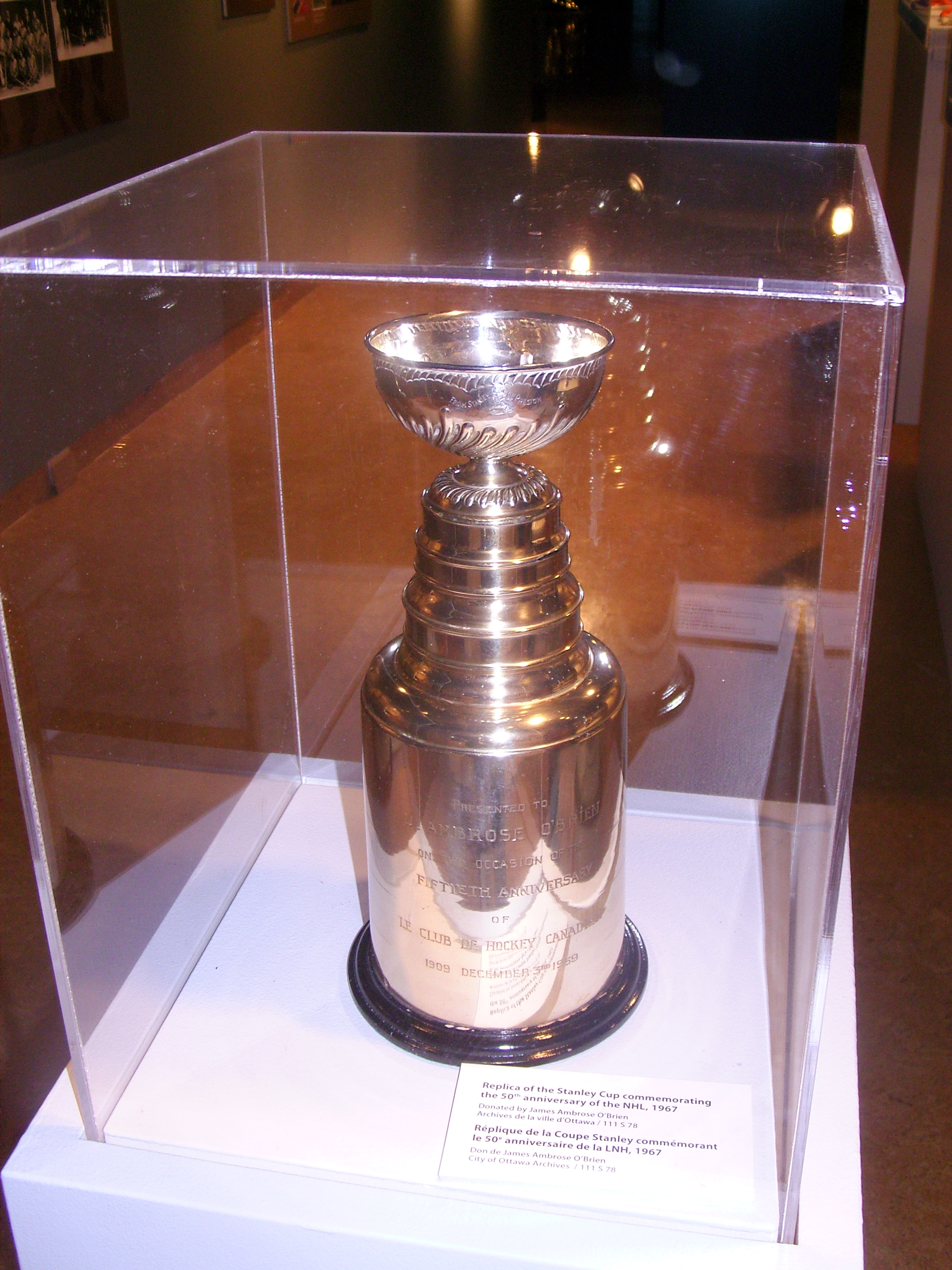
O'Brien received this Stanley Cup replica in 1967 from the Montreal Canadiens

== Biography ==
O'Brien was born in Renfrew, Ontario, the son of Michael John O'Brien, a Canadian businessman, and later one of the owners of mines in Cobalt, Ontario during the Cobalt silver rush.

O'Brien played varsity ice hockey at the University of Toronto. He moved to the Cobalt area and founded two ice hockey clubs, in Cobalt, Ontario and Haileybury, Ontario, funded by his father. In 1909, he founded the National Hockey Association and Les Canadiens, later Montreal Canadiens, and bought the Renfrew Creamery Kings. In the 1909–10 NHA season, the Creamery Kings received the nickname "Millionaires" as O'Brien signed up several stars of the time to extravagant contracts, including Fred "Cyclone" Taylor and brothers Frank Patrick and Lester "the Silver Fox" Patrick, and acquired Edouard "Newsy" Lalonde in an attempt to win the Stanley Cup for Renfrew. The attempt was unsuccessful and he folded the team after two seasons.

While in Montreal for business in November 1909, O'Brien was asked by the then owners of the Creamery Kings to apply to join the Canadian Hockey Association. He made the application but was turned down. Outside the hotel room where the CHA meetings were occurring he met Jimmy Gardner, manager of the Montreal Wanderers. Together, they developed the idea of starting their own league with O'Brien's Cobalt and Haileybury teams, the Wanderers and a new team "Les Canadiens" for Montreal to capture francophone Montrealers' interest as a rival for the Wanderers. As a result, the Montreal Canadiens were born. O'Brien only owned the team for one season. After the season, he was sued by George W. Kendall (Kennedy) owner of the Club athlétique Canadien, claiming the legal rights to the Canadiens name. A settlement was reached and on November 12, 1910 Kendall acquired the team for $7,500.

Operation of the NHA teams was expensive and the NHA was forced to implement salary caps and maximum salaries. The O'Briens reduced their involvement. Whereas in 1910, four O'Brien-backed teams played in the NHA, only one, the Millionaires, played in 1910–11, O'Brien having sold the other three NHA franchises. Before the 1911–12 season the Millionaires were also no more, its players dispersed to the other NHA teams. O'Brien was never a team owner again. O'Brien was inducted as a builder into the Hockey Hall of Fame in 1962. He died on April 24, 1968.

In December 2006, as the founder of the Montreal Canadiens, John Ambrose O'Brien was an inaugural inductee in the team's newly created 'Builders Row' in the Bell Centre.

== See also ==
- National Hockey Association
- Renfrew Millionaires
