= Renfrew Creamery Kings =

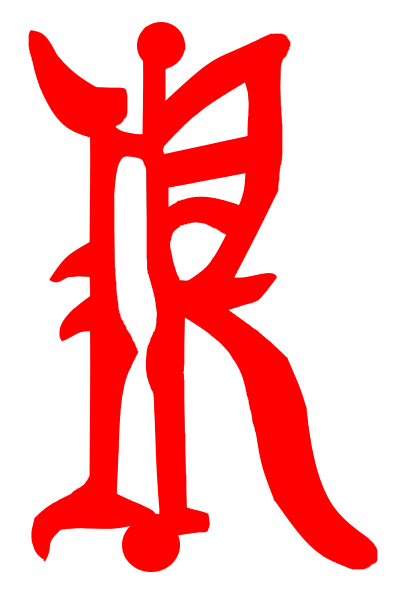
- City: Renfrew, Ontario
- League: National Hockey Association
- Founded: 1909
- Folded: 1911
- Home arena: Renfrew Hockey Arena
- Colours: Red and white
- Head coach: Alf Smith

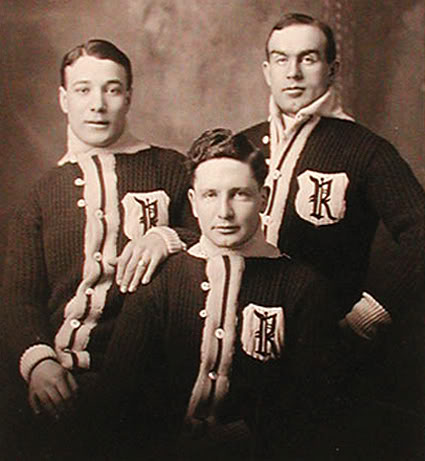
Newsy Lalonde, Frank Patrick, and Cyclone Taylor.

The Renfrew Hockey Club, also known as the Creamery Kings and the Millionaires, was a founding franchise in 1909 of the National Hockey Association, the precursor to the National Hockey League. The team was based in the founder Ambrose O'Brien's hometown of Renfrew, Ontario.

== History ==
The team's founder, Ambrose O'Brien had played varsity hockey at the University of Toronto, then continued his interest as a team founder and owner, financed by his father's amassed great wealth during the Cobalt silver rush –mining magnate Senator M. J. O'Brien.

In 1909, when O'Brien sought to join the new Canadian Hockey Association with his existing Renfrew team in the semi-pro Federal Hockey League, the application was rejected. With fellow rejectee Montreal Wanderers, O'Brien founded the NHA, along with franchises in Cobalt, Haileybury and Montreal.

With O'Brien Silver Mine money backing the Creamery Kings, named after the creamery the town was best known for, Renfrew iced a powerful team during its first season, with players Frank Patrick and Lester Patrick commanding salaries of $3,000 each, and Cyclone Taylor receiving a record-setting $5,250 for a two-month season.

In consequence, the team became widely nicknamed the "Millionaires" for the over-the-top salaries. O'Brien also secured the services of Newsy Lalonde midseason from the Canadiens franchise, and Lalonde would wind up the season as NHA's first scoring champion. Coached by Ottawa Senators legend and future Hall of Famer, Alf Smith, Renfrew finished in third place in the 1910 season with an 8-3-1 record. The team had been held as a favourite to win the Stanley Cup at the onset of the season, and at the end of the season Ottawa Senators player Bruce Stuart claimed lack of confidence played a role in the missed opportunity:

"Renfrew should have won the cup this winter. Why they had positively the greatest collection of players that I have ever seen together. Why did they lose? Simply because the team lacked confidence in itself and because it was not-properly handled until Alf Smith took charge. Those men didn't know the extent of their hockey abilities. They became discouraged too easily and again did not appear to take things with sufficient seriousness."

— Bruce Stuart on why Renfrew failed to win the Stanley Cup in 1910. Ottawa Citizen, Apr. 1, 1910.

Its second and final season, Renfrew lost Lalonde to the Montreal Canadiens, and finished with a less than stellar 8-8 record, with Don Smith and Odie Cleghorn being the leading scorers. Renfrew's final major professional game was a 7-6 victory on March 7, 1911, against the Wanderers.

Thereafter, with it being apparent that the small towns such as Renfrew, Cobalt and Haileybury could not support major senior hockey, O'Brien folded the franchise for good.

== Renfrew Arena ==
The team's first arena was their only home and lasted until a fire in the late 1920s destroyed it. A second arena called simply Renfrew Arena or Old Barn was completed in 1929.

== Hall of Famers ==
- Newsy Lalonde C
- Lester Patrick D
- Frank Patrick D
- Didier Pitre F/D
- Alf Smith RW
- Cyclone Taylor F
- Sprague Cleghorn D

== See also ==
- Renfrew Timberwolves
- Cobalt Silver Kings
- Haileybury Comets
