= National Hockey Association =

Canadian ice hockey league from 1909 to 1917

- Sport: Ice hockey
- Founded: December 2, 1909 (116 years ago)
- Founder: Ambrose O'Brien
- First season: 1910
- Folded: December 11, 1918 (107 years ago)
- No. of teams: 11
- Country: Canada
- Last champion: Montreal Canadiens (1916–17)
- Most titles: Montreal Canadiens (2), Ottawa Senators (2), Quebec Bulldogs (2)

The National Hockey Association (NHA), initially the National Hockey Association of Canada Limited, was a professional ice hockey organization with teams in Ontario and Quebec, Canada. It is the direct predecessor of today's National Hockey League (NHL), and many of the business processes of the NHL today are based on the NHA. Founded in 1909 by Ambrose O'Brien, the NHA introduced six-man hockey by removing the rover position in 1911. During its lifetime, the league coped with competition for players with the rival Pacific Coast Hockey Association (PCHA), the enlistment of players for World War I and disagreements between owners. The disagreements between owners came to a head in 1917, when the NHA suspended operations in order to get rid of an unwanted owner, Eddie Livingstone.

The remaining NHA team owners started the NHL in parallel as a temporary measure, to continue play while negotiations went on with Livingstone and other lawsuits were pending. A year later, after no progress was reached with Livingstone, the other NHA owners decided to permanently suspend the NHA. The NHA's rules, constitution and trophies were reused in the NHL.

The Montreal Canadiens are the last NHA team still in the NHL.

== History ==
=== Founding ===
In November 1909, the Eastern Canada Hockey Association (ECHA), holder of the Stanley Cup and ostensibly the pre-eminent ice hockey league, was in the midst of a dispute. The Montreal Wanderers of the ECHA had been bought by P. J. Doran, owner of the Jubilee Rink in Montreal, and he intended to move the team's games there. The Jubilee was smaller than the Wanderers' current rink, the Montreal Arena, which meant visiting teams would earn less on their trips to play the Wanderers. On November 25, 1909, the other teams in the league disbanded the ECHA and formed the new Canadian Hockey Association (CHA), which excluded the Wanderers.

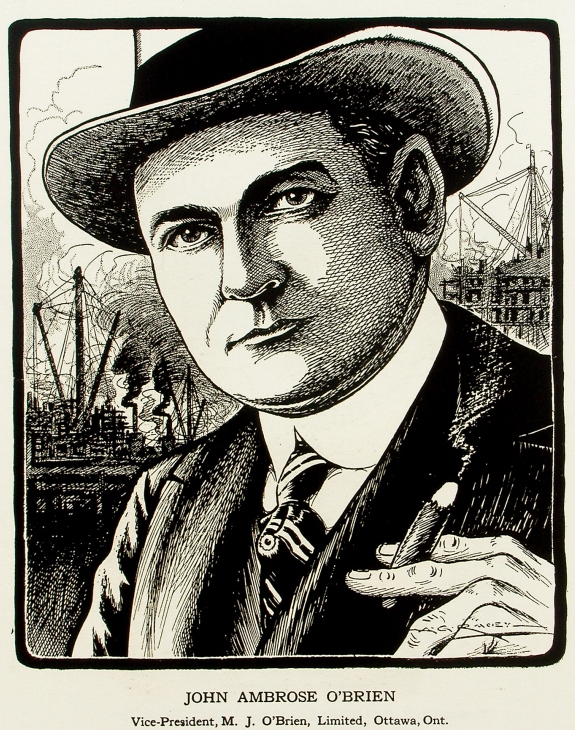
Ambrose O'Brien.

At the same time, Ambrose O'Brien of Renfrew, Ontario– scion of a prosperous silver mine owner and founder of the Renfrew Creamery Kings ice hockey team –was seeking admission to the ECHA so as to be able to contest the Stanley Cup. The team had applied to the Stanley Cup trustees as champions of the Federal League, but had been rejected. At the November 25 CHA founding meeting, held at the Windsor Hotel in Montreal, O'Brien applied to join the CHA but the application was rejected. Sitting in the lobby of the hotel after the CHA meeting, O'Brien met Jimmy Gardner of the Wanderers, whose team had also been rejected by the CHA. Together, they decided to form their own league, the National Hockey Association (NHA). With Cobalt and Haileybury, two other teams controlled by O' Brien, the NHA was founded on December 2, 1909 at a private meeting at 300 St. James Street in Montreal, and adopted the constitution of the ECHA.

At the same time, to build a rivalry and capture francophone interest in Montreal, O'Brien and Gardner conceived of creating a team consisting of francophone players, to be managed by francophones. 'Les Canadiens', known today as the Montreal Canadiens, was admitted on December 4, 1909 to be managed by Jack Laviolette, but owned by O'Brien, on the understanding ownership was to be transferred to francophone sportsmen as soon as practicable. In all, O'Brien and his father, Michael John O'Brien, were financing four teams in the league: the Renfrew Creamery Kings (which became known as the Renfrew Millionaires), Cobalt, Haileybury, and Les Canadiens. The Cobalt and Haileybury clubs were from the Timiskaming Professional Hockey League (TPHL) and Renfrew from the Federal Hockey League. Along with the Wanderers, the league had five teams.

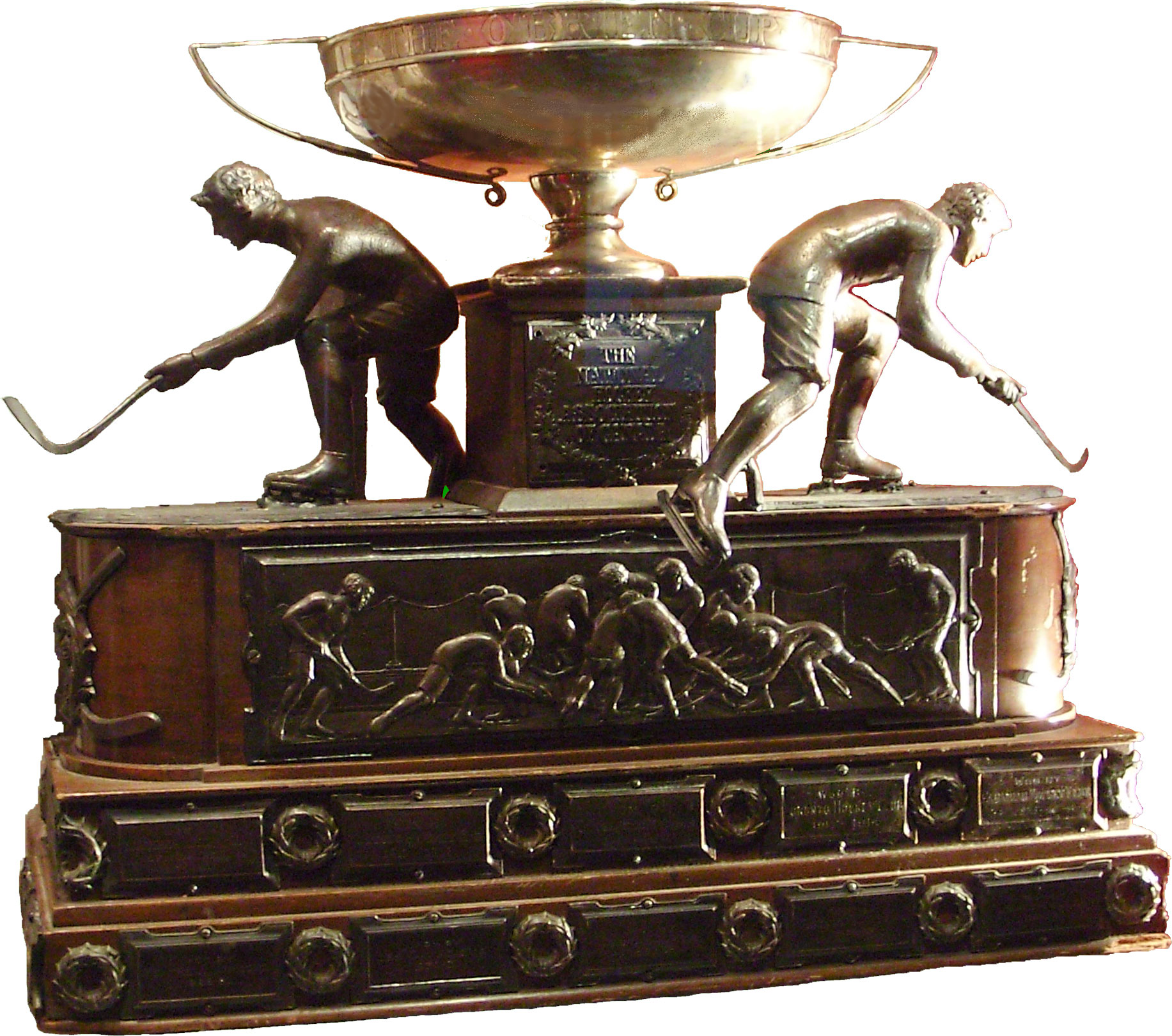
O'Brien Cup, the championship trophy of the NHA. The NHL would continue using it after 1917.

The O'Briens were determined to win the Stanley Cup and a bidding war for players immediately started. Frank and Lester Patrick were each signed by the Renfrew Millionaires for $3,000 apiece, the highest salaries recorded to that time. Renfrew also signed star player Cyclone Taylor of the champion Ottawa Senators team, reputedly at $5,000 per season.

Attendance at the CHA games was poor and a meeting of the NHA was held on January 15, 1910 to discuss a possible merger of the two leagues. Instead, the NHA admitted Ottawa and the Montreal Shamrocks to the NHA and the CHA folded. The owners of the Montreal Le National were offered the ownership of the Canadiens but turned it down. The Quebec Bulldogs and the other teams of the CHA were not even considered for membership. Games played prior to January 15 were thrown out, and the season began again, now with seven teams.

Despite the efforts of O'Brien, who added Newsy Lalonde from the Canadiens to Renfrew, the first championship went to the Wanderers, taking over the Stanley Cup and successfully defending it against Edmonton. It would be the Wanderers' only championship in the NHA.

=== 1910–1914: Consolidation ===
In November 1910, the league principals of Mike Quinn, Dickie Boon and Eddie McCafferty developed a new constitution differing from the ECHA constitution to put it on a more business-like basis. The league developed a standard player contract, a salary limit of CA$5,000 (equivalent to $142,577 in 2025) per team, the requirement to "waive" players past other clubs before they were released from the league, and a 'reserve clause' whereby teams could name ten players in a "draft" that could not join other clubs. The meetings of the association were private and only the president of the league could communicate about the meetings to the press. These rules would later be followed in the successor National Hockey League. These new principles were based on the rules of American baseball, likely due to the influence of McCafferty, who was the secretary of the Montreal Royals baseball team. The new constitution even dropped 'of Canada' from the name of the corporation "to permit of taking into affiliation hockey bodies that may be formed in the United States as well as in Canada, with a view to making it eventually the central organization in the game." The new constitution was published in the Montreal Gazette in November 1910.

The 1910 off-season led to changes in membership in the league, as Cobalt, Haileybury and Shamrocks dropped out. Les Canadiens would be taken over by George Kennedy and Quebec would join the league for the 1910–11 season. Lalonde was returned to the Canadiens. The two dormant O'Brien franchises were to be held for two Toronto teams to join the league in the future, to play in the new Arena Gardens planned for Toronto. The Wanderers incorporated, with Sam Lichtenhein taking a majority position.

The 1910–1911 season saw the start of labour unrest in the league, as the league imposed its $5,000 salary cap. The season almost foundered because of widespread dissatisfaction amongst the players at the salaries on offer, and players' unions were rumoured to be on the verge of creation at several points. The players at first intended to form their own league, but the arenas were under the NHA control and surrendered for that season. The clubs' bottom lines improved, Ottawa estimated to make six to eight thousand in profits, while the Canadiens made three to four thousand; the Wanderers two to three thousand; and Quebec at nine hundred. Only Renfrew lost money. The new constitution also affected the format of play. For the first time, the hour of play would be divided into three 20-minute periods, with five minutes of rest between the periods. Ottawa won the championship and held the Stanley Cup against Galt and Port Arthur.

In the 1911 off-season, O'Brien exited the hockey business and Renfrew exited the league. The Ottawa Hockey Club became the second club to incorporate. The NHA itself incorporated, forming a Canadian federal corporation capitalized at CA$50,000 (equivalent to $1,488,991 in 2025) divided into five hundred shares of $100 each. The purpose of incorporation was "to encourage, develop and improve the National Canadian winter game of hockey and athletic sports and pastimes."

For the 1911–12 season, the league dropped the rover position, changing the game to six-man hockey, although other leagues would hold on to seven-man play into the 1920s. Attempts would be made to reintroduce seven-man hockey in subsequent years but were unsuccessful. While the league delayed its schedule to try to accommodate the Toronto teams, who were waiting for the Arena Gardens' completion, in the end the league played with only four teams. In that same off-season, the Patrick brothers built two arenas in Vancouver and Victoria and formed the Pacific Coast Hockey Association (PCHA). The PCHA exploited the low pay of the NHA teams to raid the teams for players. Quebec won the league championship, winning its first Stanley Cup, defending it successfully against Moncton. Despite the raids by the PCHA, the NHA allowed a player-organized team of all-stars to play an exhibition series out west against the PCHA after the season. Some of the NHA players, notably Cyclone Taylor, would be enticed to join the PCHA in the following season.

In 1912–13, the two new Toronto teams joined the league, the Torontos, later dubbed the 'Blueshirts', and the Tecumsehs and the league expanded to six teams. Although the PCHA had raided Quebec for three players of its championship squad, they were replaced by top players from the Ontario and Maritime leagues, and Quebec repeated as champions. This year, the Quebec team travelled west to play the PCHA champion Victoria Aristocrats, in the first series between the two leagues' champion teams.

In the 1913 off-season, the NHA and the PCHA signed an agreement to end their bidding war for players. The agreement stipulated territorial rights, splitting Canada east and west of Port Arthur, Ontario. The four-year agreement meant each league would respect each other's reserve clauses, conduct an intraleague draft for players, have a commissioner resolve disputes, and agreed to an annual series between the two leagues for the Stanley Cup. The NHA now introduced the 'option clause' into player's contracts, holding that the team now had an exclusive option to re-sign a player after their contract expired.

The 1913–14 season, the last before World War I, saw a tie between the Torontos and the Canadiens for first place, and the league's first play-off was held. Toronto won the two-game series to win the championship and the first Stanley Cup win by any Toronto team. After the play-off, PCHA champion Victoria came east to play Toronto in a best-of-five series. The series was 'unofficial' as it was not approved by the Stanley Cup trustees, but any controversy was moot as Toronto won the series in three-straight games.

Starting in the 1914–1915 season, the Stanley Cup was awarded exclusively to the winner of a playoff between the NHA and the PCHA regular season winners. The league championship was decided by a two-game total goal playoff between the Wanderers and the Senators. Ottawa won the championship, and the right to defend the Cup against Vancouver in a three-game series in which Vancouver won in dominating fashion. The notion of a league champion being awarded the Cup to defend ceased with that season, as the Portland Rosebuds were the PCHA champions in 1915–1916 but were not automatically accorded the Cup. Instead, they played the Montreal Canadiens for the trophy (and became the first American team to do so), which the Canadiens won in a five-game series.

=== 1915–1917: World War I and the end of the NHA ===
The start of World War I meant that players started enlisting for the military to fight overseas. By 1915, World War I and PCHA raiding left the NHA without enough quality players. At first, the NHA and PCHA made peace with an agreement limiting PCHA signings of NHA players to those on teams designated by a 'draft'. However the peace did not last and disputes within the NHA and with the PCHA led to the end of the NHA. Two factions developed, Toronto and Quebec City, and the Montreal teams and Ottawa.

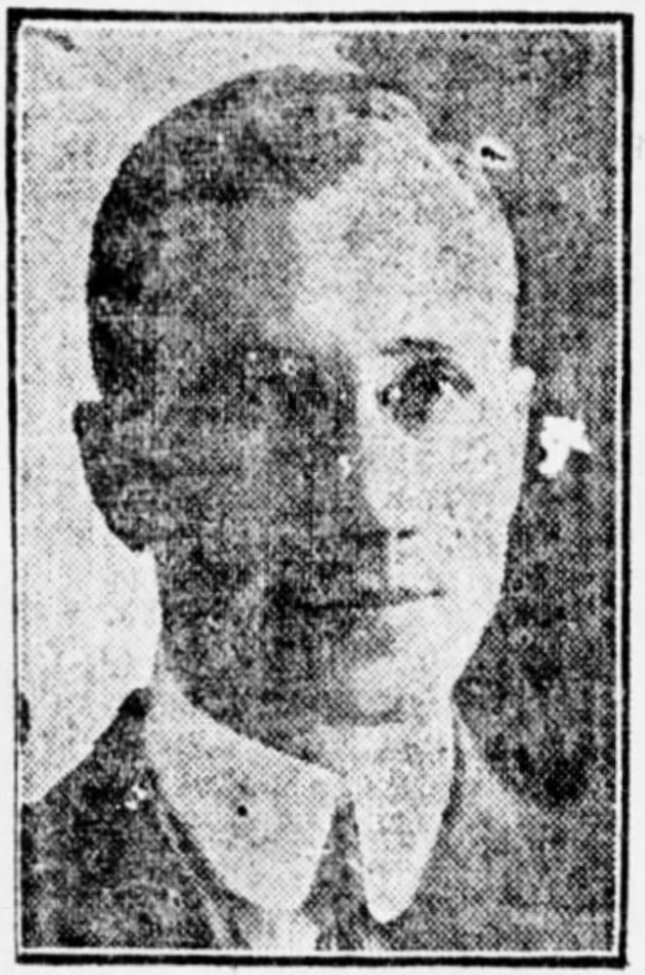
Eddie Livingstone, owner of the Toronto Shamrocks and Toronto Blueshirts.

Prior to the 1915–16 season, Toronto Shamrocks team owner Eddie Livingstone made two moves that infuriated the NHA and the PCHA. At that time Quebec was to be one of the designated NHA teams which the PCHA would draft players from. Livingstone arranged a trade with Quebec to hide some players from the draft, infuriating the PCHA. He bought the Toronto Blueshirts without league permission for its players, and ended up with no players for the Shamrocks team as the PCHA in retaliation raided the Blueshirts for players. The league ordered Livingstone to sell his Shamrocks franchise, but he was unable to do so as he had only enough players for one team. The 1915–16 season was played with only five teams, a situation whereby one team each week would not play, a situation limiting team owner revenues and infuriating the other owners. Instead of two games in Toronto to cover travel expenses from the other cities, there was only one per trip.

In 1916, the league stripped Livingstone of the Shamrocks franchise and fielded a second team in Toronto for the 1916–17 season. The team was composed of hockey players who had enlisted for wartime duty. The team, known as the 228th Battalion or Northern Fusiliers—formed in North Bay, Ontario—played wearing khaki military uniforms and was the league's most popular and highest scoring club until the regiment was ordered overseas in February 1917 and the team was forced to withdraw. A scandal ensued when several stars were subsequently discharged and alleged they had been promised commissions solely to play hockey for the military team. The Battalion dropping out left the league at five teams again. Instead of continuing with five teams, the league suspended the Blueshirts also and dispersed its players to the other clubs and continued with four teams. Livingstone threatened to sue the league over the suspension, infuriating the other owners. The league next made a demand that Livingstone sell the Toronto franchise between April and June 1917. Instead of selling, Livingstone followed through with his threat to sue the NHA.

By this time, the owners of the Canadiens, Wanderers, Senators and Bulldogs wanted nothing more to do with Livingstone. However, they discovered the NHA constitution did not allow them to simply expel him from the league. Instead, on November 22, 1917, the other four owners voted to suspend the NHA's operations. Two weeks later, the four clubs founded the National Hockey League so that they could continue the business of pro hockey without Livingstone. Every owner except Livingstone was granted a franchise in the NHL and the NHA contracts transferred. The NHL also continued to use the same rules and season format as the NHA, with the NHL champion now moving on to face the PCHA champion in the Stanley Cup Finals. Wanderers owner Sam Lichtenhein was quoted as saying, "We didn't throw Livingstone out; he's still got his franchise in the old National Hockey Association. He has his team, and we wish him well. The only problem is he's playing in a one-team league."

The Bulldogs, however, announced they didn't have enough financing to ice a team for the NHL's first season. Wanting to balance the schedule, and feeling it unthinkable not to have a team from Canada's second-largest city, the NHL granted a temporary franchise to the Toronto Arena Company, which leased the Blueshirts' players from Livingstone pending resolution of the dispute. This temporary franchise would evolve into today's Toronto Maple Leafs.

The NHA's organization did not dissolve immediately. The owners had launched a lawsuit against the Battalion to attempt to make the Canadian Army pay $3000 for leaving the league and this had yet to be heard in court. The NHL could operate in the meantime, without Livingstone.

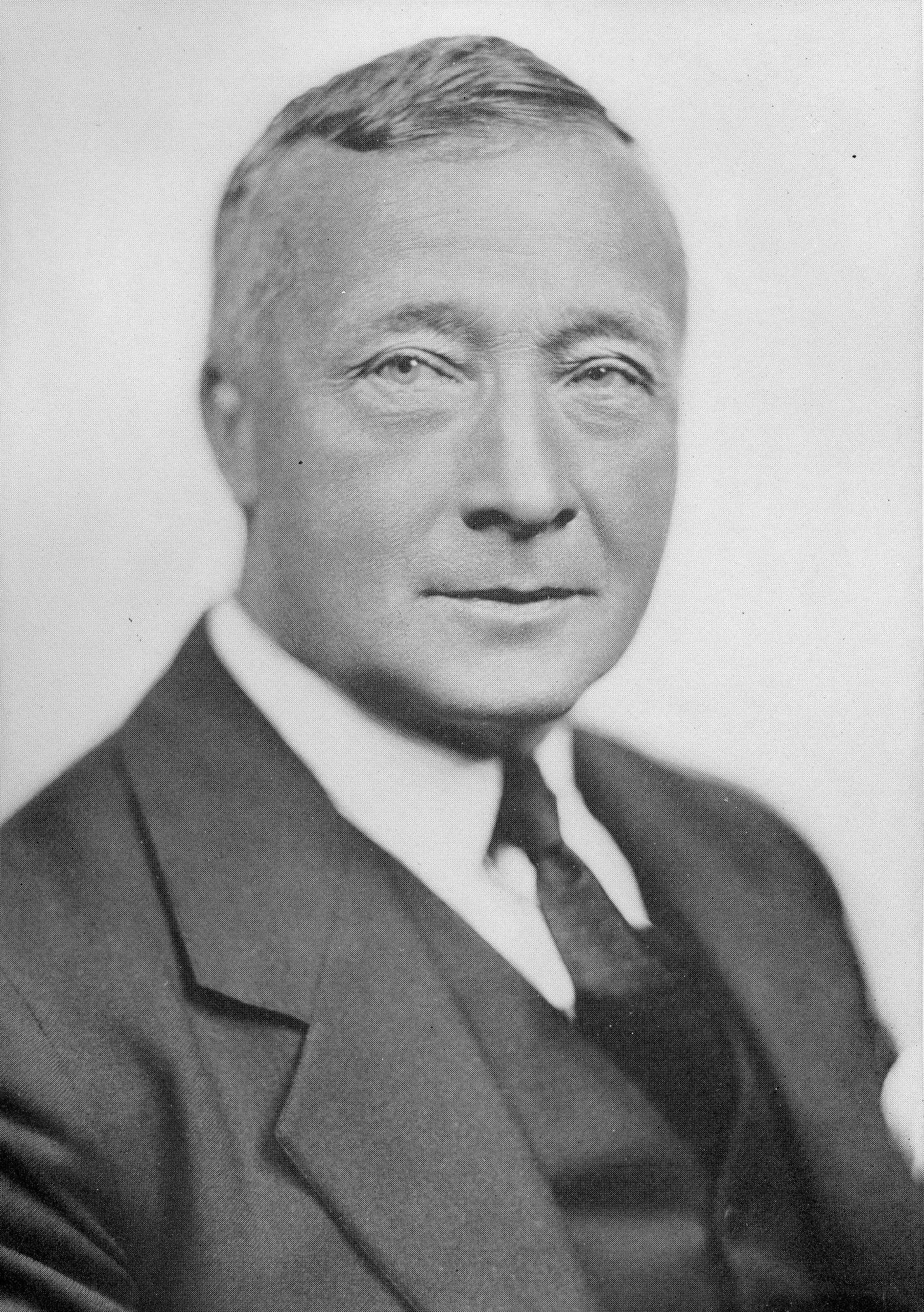
Frank Calder served as secretary-treasurer of the NHA, from 1914 until 1917. He also served as the last acting president of the league, following Frank Robinson's resignation in 1917.

The NHA's officials met nearly a year later, on September 20, 1918, when a vote was taken to permanently suspend operations over Livingstone's objections. That fall, Livingstone, along with Percy Quinn, attempted to launch a rival "Canadian Hockey Association" (CHA) unsuccessfully. Blocked, Livingstone and Quinn called a final meeting of the NHA owners on December 11, 1918. The NHL owners, against the wishes of Frank Calder, attended the meeting. Calder considered that an NHA meeting could not proceed with shareholders not having paid legal fees owed the league books held in court for lawsuits. Livingstone's plan was to use the fact that the Canadiens had a minority shareholder, contrary to NHA voting rules, to disallow the Canadiens vote and cause the vote to swing their way and lead to the resumption of the NHA. At first, Lichtenhein refused to recognize Quinn's purchase of the Quebec NHL franchise, but agreed to if Quinn would pay the costs of the meeting itself, which he refused. The meeting ended when the NHL owners offered to pay legal fees owed to the NHA so as to proceed, according to Calder's terms, but Livingstone and Quinn refused. The NHL owners then left the meeting. Separately, the Montreal and Ottawa NHA owners met and paid the fees owing to the league and Calder fined the Torontos, Ontarios and Quebec a further $200. Calder now publicly promised to file a court order to "wind up" the NHA organization. When the NHL decided to continue with play, Livingstone and Quinn threatened injunctions to stop the NHL from operating. However, the threats were not followed through on and the NHL season began on schedule. The NHA organization itself was not formally dissolved for several years afterwards and Frank Calder held the presidency in both organizations.

== Legacy ==
The NHA was innovative for its time. The league put forth several innovations, among them the division of each game into three periods, the abolition of the rover position, the institution of match penalties, and allowing line changes on the fly. On the business side, the NHA introduced the standard contract, reserve clauses, waiver draft and the first salary cap.

While the originator of jersey numbers in ice hockey is disputed, the NHA is commonly cited as the first to use them, requiring players wear numbered armbands beginning with the 1911–12 season.

The championship trophy of the NHA was the O'Brien Cup, made of solid silver, donated by the O'Brien family. It survived as the championship trophy of the NHL until the Western Hockey League, the successor to the PCHA, folded after the 1925–26 hockey season. This left the NHL as the only professional league that competed for the Stanley Cup. Thus starting in the 1926–27 season, the Stanley Cup became the championship trophy of the NHL. The O'Brien Cup was then awarded annually as an NHL trophy until being retired in 1950.

Three current NHL teams, the Canadiens, Maple Leafs and Senators have roots in the NHA. While the Canadiens acknowledge their NHA history and records, the Maple Leafs do not claim the Blueshirts' history as their own, which would include an additional Stanley Cup championship. The original Ottawa Senators, the oldest of the three, continued in the NHL after the NHA's disbandment, but ceased operations in 1935. Ottawa returned to the league in 1992 having been granted a new franchise to operate as the current Ottawa Senators. The current club honors the Ottawa club history dating back to the 1880s, with banners at the Canadian Tire Centre.

== Teams ==
=== Season by season record ===
Season	Teams	Champion
1910	Cobalt Silver Kings, Haileybury Comets, Montreal Canadiens, Montreal Shamrocks, Montreal Wanderers, Ottawa Senators†, Renfrew Creamery Kings	Montreal Wanderers†
1910–11	Montreal Canadiens, Montreal Wanderers, Ottawa Senators, Quebec Bulldogs, Renfrew Creamery Kings	Ottawa Senators†
1911–12	Montreal Canadiens, Montreal Wanderers, Ottawa Senators, Quebec Bulldogs	Quebec Bulldogs†
1912–13	Montreal Canadiens, Montreal Wanderers, Ottawa Senators, Quebec Bulldogs, Toronto Blueshirts, Toronto Tecumsehs	Quebec Bulldogs†
1913–14	Montreal Canadiens, Montreal Wanderers, Ottawa Senators, Quebec Bulldogs, Toronto Blueshirts, Toronto Ontarios	Toronto† (won playoff over Canadiens)
1914–15	Montreal Canadiens, Montreal Wanderers, Ottawa Senators, Quebec Bulldogs, Toronto Blueshirts, Toronto Shamrocks	Ottawa Senators (won playoff over Wanderers)
1915–16	Montreal Canadiens, Montreal Wanderers, Ottawa Senators, Quebec Bulldogs, Toronto Blueshirts	Montreal Canadiens†
1916–17	Montreal Canadiens, Montreal Wanderers, Ottawa Senators, Quebec Bulldogs, Toronto Blueshirts*, Toronto 228th Battalion*	Montreal Canadiens (won the playoffs over Ottawa)

- † Stanley Cup Champions. In 1910, both the Wanderers and Senators are considered champions.
- *228th Battalion was from North Bay, Ontario, training at Camp Borden and in Toronto at the time. It dropped out after the first half of the season. Toronto was suspended by the league after the first half.

=== Team history ===
Team	Years	Origin
Cobalt Silver Kings	1909–10	from Timiskaming Professional Hockey League (TPHL), returned to TPHL in 1910.
Haileybury Comets	1909–10	from TPHL, returned to TPHL in 1910.
Les Canadiens/Montreal Canadiens	1909–1917	new, originally held by O'Brien; taken over by George Kennedy after 1910 season.
Montreal Shamrocks	1910	from ECHA, joined January 1910, folded after one season.
Montreal Wanderers	1909–1917	from ECHA, joined December 1909
Ottawa Senators	1910–1917	from ECHA, joined January 1910
Quebec Bulldogs	1910–1917	from ECHA, joined December 1910
Renfrew Creamery Kings	1909–1911	from Federal League, joined December 1909, folded in 1911.
Toronto Blueshirts	1912–1917	new, franchise bought from O'Brien.
Toronto Tecumsehs renamed Toronto Ontarios, 1913–1914 renamed Toronto Shamrocks, 1915	1912–1916	new, franchise bought from O'Brien. Bankrupt in 1913 and sold. Sold again in 1914. Merged into Toronto Blueshirts in 1916.
Toronto 228th Battalion	1916–17	new, took the place of Tecumsehs/Ontarios/Shamrocks for the 1916–17 season, composed of professional hockey players in the military; based in North Bay, Ontario

== NHA presidents ==
Image	Holder	Start	End
	Mike Doheny	1909	1910
	Emmett Quinn	1910	1914
	T. Y. Foster	1914	1914
	Emmett Quinn	1914	1916
	Frank Robinson	1916	1917

Frank Robinson submitted his resignation letter during an NHA's meeting on October 20, 1917. However, his resignation was not considered and he was voted as NHA president for another term. In Robinson's absence, the secretary-treasurer of the league, Frank Calder, chaired NHA meetings and served as the acting president of the NHA.

== See also ==
- 1918–19 NHL season
- List of ice hockey leagues
- List of pre-NHL seasons
- List of Stanley Cup champions
