= Arthur Throop =

Canadian ice hockey player

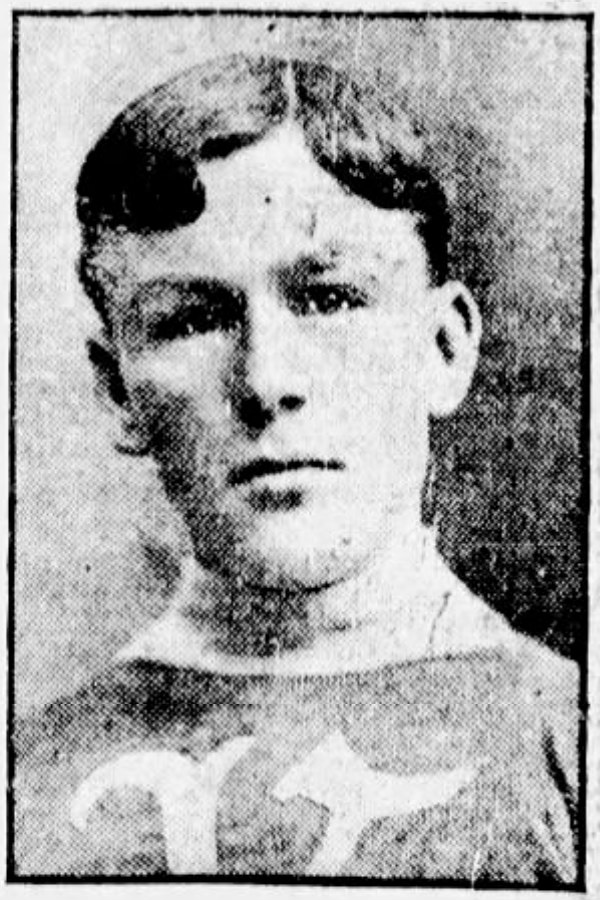
- Throop with the Ottawa Victorias.
- Born: August 19, 1884 Ottawa, Ontario, Canada
- Died: June 24, 1973 (aged 88) Haileybury, Ontario, Canada
- Height: 5 ft 6 in (168 cm)
- Weight: 130 lb (59 kg; 9 st 4 lb)
- Position: Left wing
- Shot: Left
- Played for: Ottawa Victorias; Pittsburgh Lyceum; Pittsburgh Bankers; Brantford Indians; Toronto Tecumsehs; Haileybury Comets; New Westminster Royals; Portland Rosebuds
- Playing career: 1902–1915

Arthur Leonard "Art" Throop (August 19, 1884 – June 24, 1973) was a Canadian professional ice hockey player. He played for the New Westminster Royals (1913–14) and Portland Rosebuds (1914–15) of the Pacific Coast Hockey Association. He also previously played for the Ottawa Victorias, and during his time with the club he was involved in a 1907 FAHL game which saw the death of Bud McCourt. He suffered a blow to the head from an opposing player's stick during a brawl that ensued that game.

Throop also spent time in the National Hockey Association with the Toronto Tecumsehs and Haileybury Comets.

Throop died in 1973 at a Haileybury hospital.

He was the last surviving former player of the Haileybury Comets and the Toronto Tecumsehs.

== Statistics ==
			Regular season					Playoffs
Season	Team	League	GP	G	A	Pts	PIM	GP	G	A	Pts	PIM
1905–06	Ottawa Victorias	FAHL	8	6	0	6	10	–	–	–	–	–
1906–07	Ottawa Victorias	FAHL	7	4	0	4	–	–	–	–	–	–
1907–08	Pittsburgh Lyceum	WPHL	17	7	0	7	–	–	–	–	–	–
1907–08	Pittsburgh Bankers	World Pro. Series	–	–	–	–	–	1	0	0	0	–
1908–09	Pittsburgh Lyceum	WPHL	8	3	0	3	–	–	–	–	–	–
1908–09	Brantford Indians	OPHL	15	17	0	17	52	–	–	–	–	–
1910	Haileybury Comets	NHA	12	9	0	9	43	–	–	–	–	–
1912–13	Toronto Tecumsehs	NHA	20	11	0	11	48	–	–	–	–	–
1913–14	New Westminster Royals	PCHA	10	5	3	8	18	–	–	–	–	–
1914–15	Portland Rosebuds	PCHA	18	16	8	24	43	–	–	–	–	–
NHA totals			32	20	0	20	91	–	–	–	–	–
PCHA totals			28	21	11	32	61	–	–	–	–	–
