= Don Smith (ice hockey, born 1887) =

Canadian ice hockey player

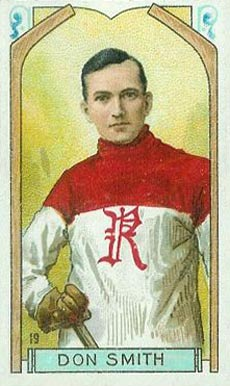
- Don Smith with the Renfrew Creamery Kings
- Born: June 3, 1887 Cornwall, Ontario, Canada
- Died: May 13, 1959 (aged 71)
- Height: 5 ft 7 in (170 cm)
- Weight: 160 lb (73 kg; 11 st 6 lb)
- Position: Left wing
- Shot: Left
- Played for: Montreal Shamrocks; Renfrew Creamery Kings; Montreal Canadiens; Montreal Wanderers
- Playing career: 1904–1920

Donald John Smith (June 3, 1887 – May 13, 1959) was a Canadian professional ice hockey player. Smith was one of the earliest professional ice hockey players, playing professionally in the first decade of the 1900s. Smith played in the National Hockey League and its predecessor National Hockey Association for the Montreal Canadiens, Montreal Shamrocks, Montreal Wanderers and Renfrew Creamery Kings.

He was an older brother of ice hockey and lacrosse player Guy Smith.

== Playing career ==
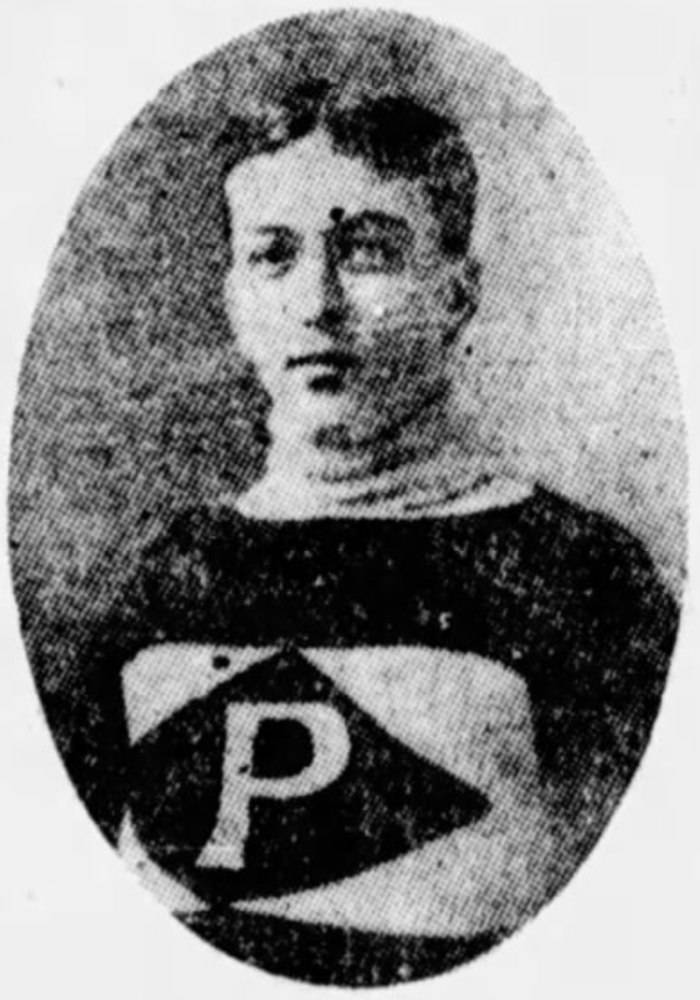
Smith with Portage la Prairie.

Smith played senior amateur hockey for his hometown Cornwall, Ontario club in the Federal Amateur Hockey League from 1904 until 1907. During a March 6, 1907 FAHL game between Cornwall H/C and the Ottawa Victorias Smith's forward teammate Owen McCourt was struck in the head by one or several opponent sticks and died the following morning of his injuries.

Smith became a professional with Portage la Prairie, Manitoba of the Manitoba Professional Hockey League (MPHL) in 1907–08. He returned to Ontario the following season, playing for St. Catharines, Ontario and Toronto in the Ontario Professional Hockey League (OPHL). In 1909–10, he joined the Montreal Shamrocks of the National Hockey Association (NHA). He played in 1910–11 for the Renfrew Creamery Kings before joining the Victoria Aristocrats of the Pacific Coast Hockey Association (PCHA) for a season. He returned the following season (1912–13) to the Montreal Canadiens and played for the Canadiens until 1915 when he was sold to the Montreal Wanderers.

Smith left the league after the 1915–16 NHA season to serve in World War I. Upon his return, in 1919–20, Smith re-joined the Montreal Canadiens, now in the National Hockey League (NHL), for one last year of professional ice hockey. He refereed and coached in ice hockey in later years.

== Career statistics ==
=== Regular season and playoffs ===
			Regular season					Playoffs
Season	Team	League	GP	G	A	Pts	PIM	GP	G	A	Pts	PIM
1904–05	Cornwall Hockey Club	FAHL	7	4	0	4	—	—	—	—	—	—
1905–06	Cornwall Hockey Club	FAHL	5	2	0	2	—	—	—	—	—	—
1906–07	Cornwall Hockey Club	FAHL	9	16	0	16	—	—	—	—	—	—
1907–08	Portage la Prairie Cities	MPHL	14	19	0	19	—	—	—	—	—	—
1908–09	St. Catharines Pros	OPHL	6	10	0	10	12	—	—	—	—	—
1908–09	Toronto Professionals	OPHL	8	11	0	11	15	—	—	—	—	—
1909–10	Montreal ACB	MCHL	7	6	0	6	—	—	—	—	—	—
1909–10	Montreal Shamrocks	CHA	3	7	0	7	3	—	—	—	—	—
1909–10	Montreal Shamrocks	NHA	12	14	0	14	58	—	—	—	—	—
1910–11	Renfrew Creamery Kings	NHA	16	26	0	26	49	—	—	—	—	—
1911–12	Victoria Senators	PCHA	16	19	0	19	22	—	—	—	—	—
1912–13	Montreal Canadiens	NHA	20	19	0	19	52	—	—	—	—	—
1913–14	Montreal Canadiens	NHA	20	18	10	28	18	2	1	0	1	7
1914–15	Montreal Canadiens	NHA	11	2	5	7	18	—	—	—	—	—
1914–15	Montreal Wanderers	NHA	8	4	3	7	21	2	1	0	1	12
1915–16	Montreal Wanderers	NHA	23	14	2	16	56	—	—	—	—	—
1919–20	Montreal Canadiens	NHL	12	1	0	1	6	—	—	—	—	—
NHA totals			110	97	20	117	272	4	2	0	2	19
NHL totals			12	1	0	1	6	—	—	—	—	—

== Transactions ==
- Signed as a free agent by St. Catharines (OPHL), December 8, 1908.
- Signed as a free agent by Toronto (OPHL) after St. Catharines (OPHL) folded, January 22, 1909.
- Signed as a free agent by Trenton (EOPHL), December 22, 1910.
- Signed by Renfrew (NHA) after jumping contract with Trenton (EOPHL), December 27, 1910.
- Claimed by Montreal Wanderers (NHA) in Dispersal Draft of Renfrew (NHA) players, November 12, 1911.
- Signed by Victoria (PCHA) after jumping contract with Montreal Wanderers (NHA), December, 1911.
- Signed as a free agent by Montreal Canadiens (NHA), November 26, 1912.
- Traded to Montreal Wanderers by Montreal Canadiens for cash, February 2, 1915.
- Rights not retained by Montreal Wanderers after NHA folded, November 26, 1917.
- Signed as a free agent by Montreal, December 11, 1919.

Source
NHL.com
