= Ernie Dubeau =

Canadian ice hockey player (1882 - 1951)

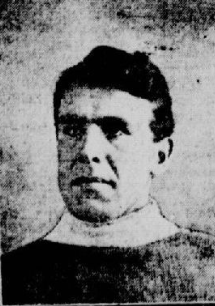
- Dubeau in uniform of National hockey team
- Born: April 19, 1882 Brockville, Ontario, Canada
- Died: June 19, 1951 (aged 69) Ogdensburg, New York, US
- Height: 5 ft 9 in (175 cm)
- Weight: 160 lb (73 kg; 11 st 6 lb)
- Position: Defence
- Shot: Right
- Played for: Montreal Canadiens; Montreal National; Montreal Shamrocks
- Playing career: 1906–1915

Ernest John Dubeau (April 19, 1882 – June 19, 1951) was a Canadian professional ice hockey defenceman. He played from 1906 until 1915 for the Montreal Canadiens, Montreal Le National, Montreal Shamrocks, Berlin Dutchmen and Portage la Prairie. He was born in Brockville, Ontario.

== Playing career ==
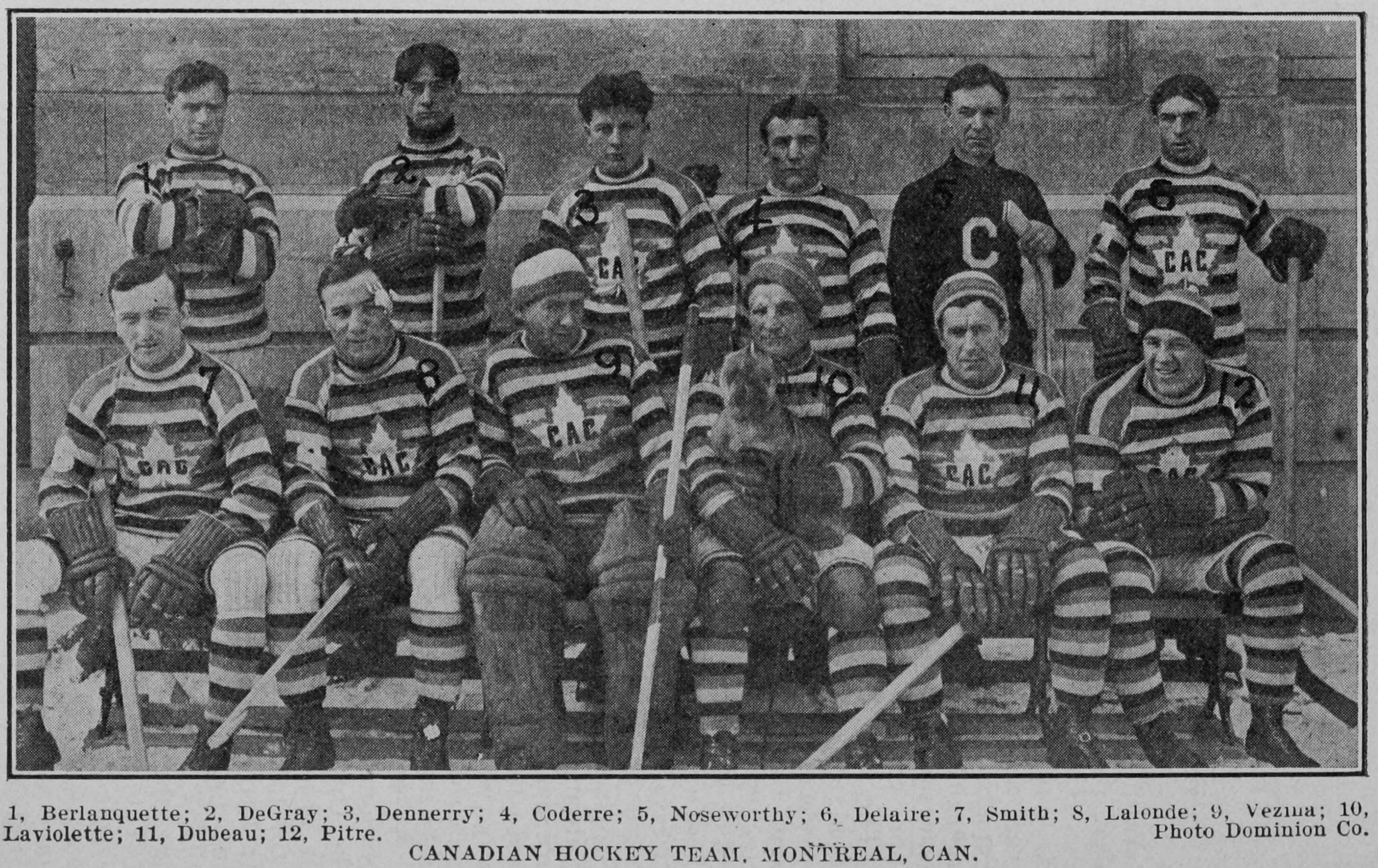
Dubeau, second from right in the front row, with the 1912–13 Montreal Canadiens.

Ernest Dubeau first played senior hockey for Brockville in the Federal Amateur Hockey League in 1905–06. He turned professional the following season for Portage la Prairie of the Manitoba Professional Hockey League, where he played for two seasons. He returned east in 1908 and played for the Berlin Dutchmen of the Ontario Professional Hockey League, and the Montreal Shamrocks of the ECHA. He played four games for Montreal Le National of the Canadian Hockey Association before the league folded. He played for Trenton in his home province of Ontario in 1910–11, before winning a starting job with the Montreal Canadiens for the 1911–12 season.

Dubeau signed with the Canadiens on November 27, 1911. He played four seasons with the team before he was traded to Toronto for Skene Ronan on January 17, 1916. Dubeau scored 16 goals in 76 career games with the Canadiens.
