= 1906–07 FAHL season =

Canadian ice hockey league season

The 1906–07 Federal Amateur Hockey League (FAHL) season lasted from December 28 until March 6. The four teams were to play a twelve-game schedule, but the season ended early when two teams resigned from the league – the Montreal Montagnards over a dispute with a league ruling, and Cornwall HC when their top scorer, Owen 'Bud' McCourt, died following an on-ice brawl with the Ottawa Victorias. Ottawa were awarded the season championship.

== Season ==
Morrisburg HC joined the league for the season, but was not of the same calibre as the others and did not win a game.

=== Highlights ===
Cornwall defeated Ottawa Victorias on February 15. Ottawa protested the game, as Cornwall players Degray and McCourt had also played two games that season with the Montreal Shamrocks in the rival Eastern Canada Amateur Hockey Association (ECAHA). The FAHL ordered the match be replayed, in Cornwall, on March 6, and did allow McCourt to play for Cornwall. During an on-ice brawl at the rematch, McCourt was struck in the head by the hockey sticks of two or more Ottawa players and knocked unconscious. McCourt died the next day, and Cornwall resigned from the league.

The Montagnards also used two players from the ECAHA's Montreal Shamrocks when they played Cornwall on February 25, winning the game 7–3. When Cornwall was told by the FAHL that they must replay Ottawa for using ECAHA players on February 15, they protested the February 25 game on the same grounds. When the FAHL agreed, the Montagnards refused to play the rematch and resigned from the league.

=== Final standing ===
Note GP = Games Played, W = Wins, L = Losses, T = Ties, GF = Goals For, GA = Goals Against

| Team | GP | W | L | T | GF | GA |
|---|---|---|---|---|---|---|
| Montreal Montagnards | 11 | 8 | 1 | 2 | 74 | 53 |
| Cornwall HC | 11 | 6 | 4 | 1 | 58 | 39 |
| Ottawa Victorias | 11 | 6 | 4 | 1 | 43 | 54 |
| Morrisburg HC | 11 | 0 | 11 | 0 | 25 | 54 |

† Morrisburg defaulted 4 games.

== Schedule and results ==
| Month | Day | Visitor | Score | Home | Score |
|---|---|---|---|---|---|
| Dec. | 28 | Victorias | 4 | Montagnards | 6 |
| Jan. | 4‡ | Victorias | | Morrisburg | |
| Jan. | 11 | Morrisburg | 2 | Cornwall | 10 |
| Jan. | 12 | Montagnards | 7 | Victorias | 10 |
| Jan. | 14 | Morrisburg | 7 | Montagnards | 10 |
| Jan. | 18 | Victorias | 3 | Cornwall | 8 |
| Jan. | 23 | Montagnards | 7 | Morrisburg | 4 |
| Jan. | 23‡ | Cornwall | | Morrisburg | |
| Jan. | 27 | Cornwall | 6 | Victorias | (OT 7') |
| Feb. | 1 | Montagnards | 2 | Cornwall | 2 |
| Feb. | 4 | Victorias | 5 | Montagnards | 6 |
| Feb. | 8 | Morrisburg | 4 | Victorias | 5 |
| Feb. | 11 | Cornwall | 1 | Montagnards | 4 |
| Feb. | 15 | Victorias | 2 | Cornwall | 4 |
| Feb. | 15 | Morrisburg | 5 | Montagnards | 11 |
| Feb. | 19‡ | Cornwall | | Morrisburg | |
| Feb. | 22 | Montagnards | 6 | Victorias | 6 |
| Feb. | 22 | Morrisburg | 3 | Cornwall | 11 |
| Feb. | 25 | Cornwall | 6 | Montagnards | 8 |
| Mar. | 1 | Montagnards | 7 | Cornwall | 3 |
| Mar. | 4‡ | Victorias | | Morrisburg | |
| Mar. | 6 | Victorias | 3 | Cornwall | 11 |

‡ Defaulted by Morrisburg.

== Player statistics ==
=== Scoring leaders ===
Note: GP = Games played, G = Goals scored

| Name | Club | GP | G |
|---|---|---|---|
| Owen McCourt | Cornwall | 8 | 16 |
| Don Smith | Cornwall | 9 | 16 |
| Bob Harrison | Victorias | 7 | 15 |
| Alphonse Prevost | Montagnards | 7 | 13 |
| Fred Strike | Montagnards | 8 | 12 |
| Bill Lannon | Montagnards | 7 | 12 |
| Aeneas McMillan | Cornwall | 9 | 19 |
| Jack Marshall | Montagnards | 3 | 6 |
| Ken Mallen | Morrisburg | 5 | 6 |
| Harley Buchan | Morrisburg | 4 | 5 |

=== Goaltender averages ===
Note: GP = Games played, GA = Goals against, SO = Shutouts, GAA = Goals against average

| Name | Club | GP | GA | SO | GAA |
|---|---|---|---|---|---|
| Jack Hunter | Cornwall | 9 | 39 | | 4.3 |
| Henri Menard | Montagnards | 10 | 49 | | 4.7 |
| Billy Hague | Victorias | 1 | 6 | | 6.0 |
| Bill Bannerman | Victorias | 7 | 48 | | 6.9 |
| Richard Lariviere | Morrisburg | 4 | 36 | | 9.0 |
| Broder | Morrisburg | 1 | 11 | | 11.0 |

== See also ==
- 1907 ECAHA season
- Federal Amateur Hockey League
- List of Stanley Cup champions
- List of pre-NHL seasons
- List of ice hockey leagues

| Preceded by 1905–06 FAHL season | FAHL seasons 1906–07 | Succeeded by 1908 FHL season |
