= Ed Millaire =

Canadian ice hockey player

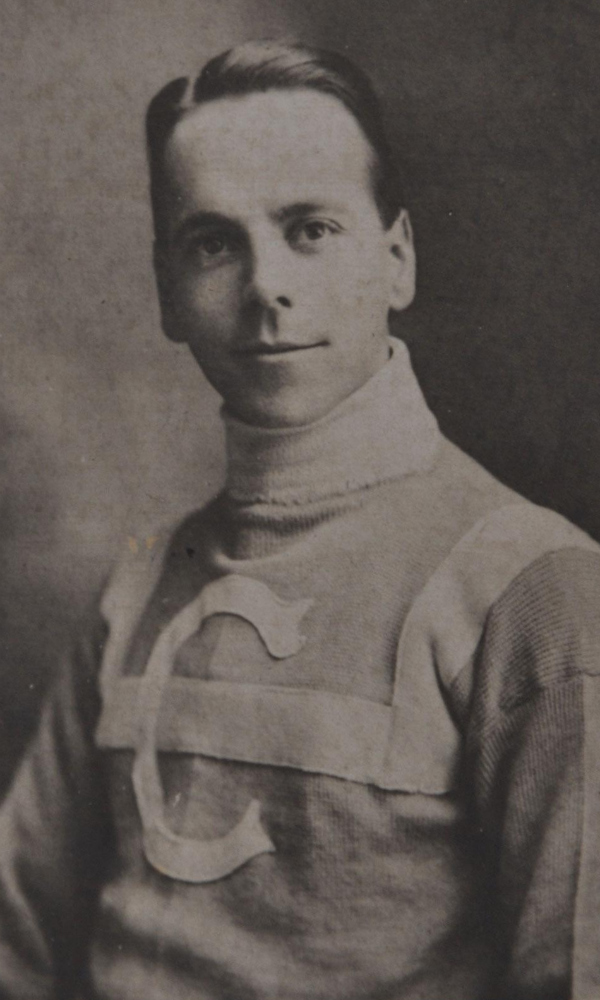
- Born: September 18, 1882 Lasalle, Quebec, Canada
- Died: November 16, 1949 (aged 67) Godbout, Quebec, Canada
- Height: 5 ft 5 in (165 cm)
- Weight: 150 lb (68 kg; 10 st 10 lb)
- Position: Rover
- Played for: Montreal Montagnards; Montreal Canadiens
- Playing career: 1898–1912

Joseph Napoleon Edouard Millaire (September 18, 1882 – November 16, 1949) was an amateur and later professional ice hockey player from 1898 until 1912. He is one of the first francophone players to play in senior-level ice hockey in Canada, the sport having been dominated to that time by the anglophone community in Montreal. He is an original Montreal Canadiens player.

== Playing career ==
Millaire played junior hockey for Montreal St. Mary's College from 1898 until 1902. He started medical training at Laval University and did not return to hockey until the 1904-05 season, playing with the Montreal Montagnards of the Federal Amateur Hockey League, for which he played two seasons as well as being a member of the Laval team. He played one professional season 1909-10 for the Montreal Canadiens.

== Personal life ==
Millaire completed his studies at Laval and became a medical doctor. He died in Godbout, Quebec in 1949.

== See also ==
- National Hockey Association
- 1910 NHA season
