= Frank Switzer =

Canadian ice hockey player

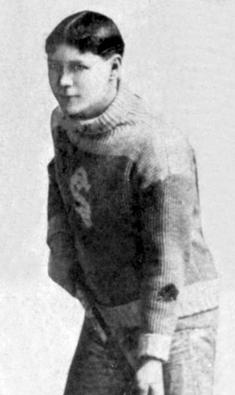
- Switzer with the Michigan Soo Indians.
- Born: December 13, 1882 Stratford, Ontario, Canada
- Died: March 28, 1970 (aged 87) Cleveland, Ohio, United States
- Position: Left wing
- Shot: Left
- Played for: Pittsburgh Keystones; Michigan Soo Indians; Winnipeg Strathconas; Winnipeg Maple Leafs; Belleville
- Playing career: 1901–1908; 1910–11

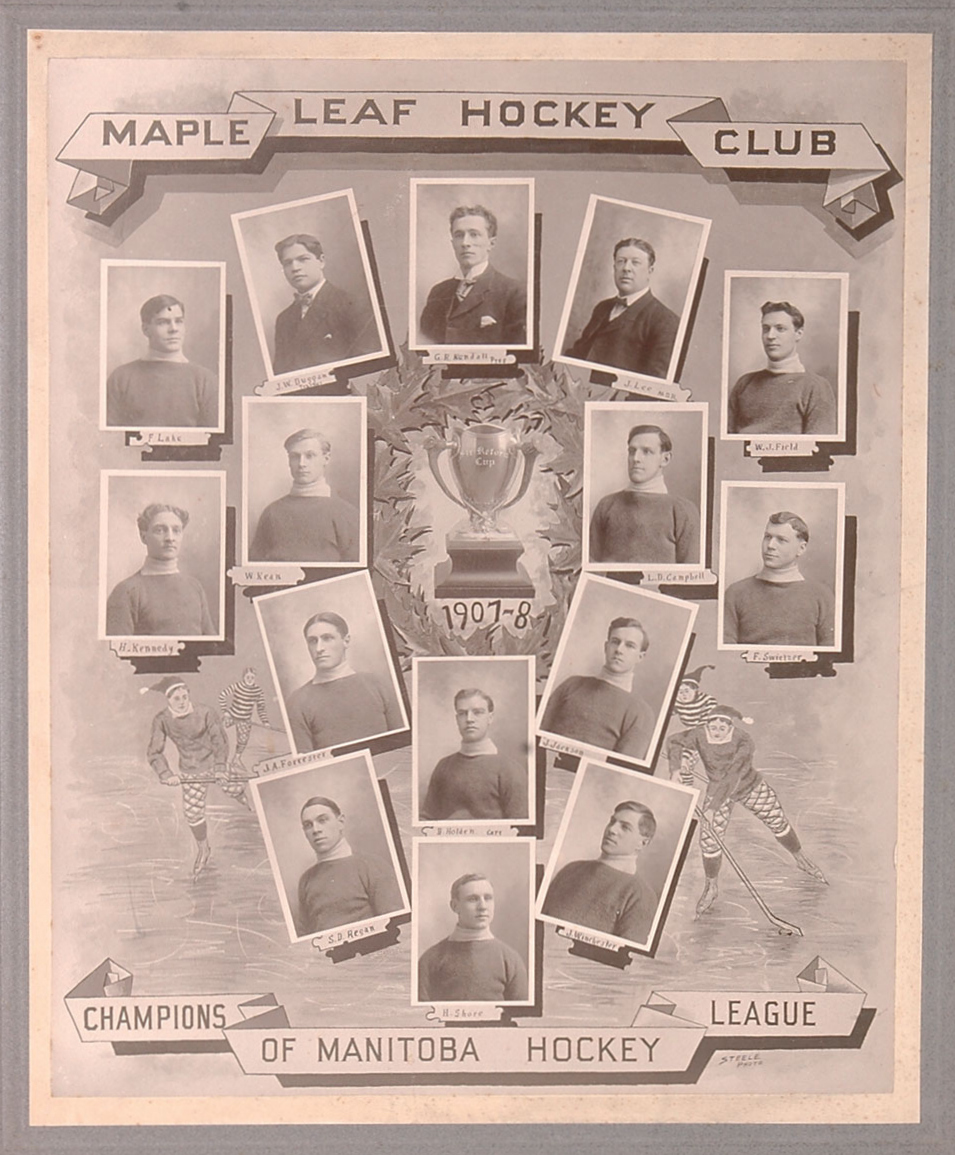
Frank Switzer, at far right in the second row from the top, with the Winnipeg Maple Leafs in the 1907–08 season.

Franklin Louis Schweitzer, last name also spelt Sweitzer, Switzer, or Swietzer, (December 13, 1882 – March 28, 1970) was a Canadian professional ice hockey left winger who was active in the early days of professional hockey, from 1901 to 1911.

Switzer was born in Stratford, Ontario.

== Professional career ==
In the 1902–03 season, Switzer played three games with the Pittsburgh Keystones of the American semi-professional Western Pennsylvania Hockey League. From 1903 to 1907 Switzer played for the Michigan Soo Indians, and for three seasons between 1904 and 1907 he represented the club in the International Professional Hockey League, the first fully professional hockey league, where he played alongside future Hockey Hall of Fame members Didier Pitre and Jack Laviolette.

The IPHL folded before the 1907–08 season and Switzer switched league when he moved north the border to Winnipeg and the Manitoba Hockey League where he represented the Winnipeg Strathconas for 15 games. He also played one game and registered one goal for the MHL club Winnipeg Maple Leafs that same season. Although he only played in one game for the team, Switzer appeared in the Maple Leafs team photo that year. Winnipeg Maple Leafs won the MHL championship in the 1907–08 season and later challenged ECAHA champions Montreal Wanderers for the Stanley Cup in March 1908. Wanderers won the series with the scores of 11-5 and 9-3, and Switzer didn't play in any of the challenge games for the Maple Leafs.

Switzer didn't play in the 1908–09 and 1909–10 seasons. In the 1910–11 season, he played one game for Belleville of the EOPHL.

== Statistics ==
Exh. = Exhibition games

			Regular season					Playoffs
Season	Team	League	GP	G	A	Pts	PIM	GP	G	A	Pts	PIM
1902–03	Pittsburgh Keystones	WPHL	3	0	0	0	2	–	–	–	–	–
1903–04	Michigan Soo Indians	Exh.	20	43	0	43	0	–	–	–	–	–
		US-Champ	–	–	–	–	–	4	2	0	2	2
1904–05	Michigan Soo Indians	IPHL	18	18	0	18	17	–	–	–	–	–
1905–06	Michigan Soo Indians	IPHL	22	25	0	25	18	–	–	–	–	–
1906–07	Michigan Soo Indians	IPHL	22	27	8	35	33	–	–	–	–	–
1907–08	Winnipeg Strathconas	MHL	15	14	3	17	21	–	–	–	–	–
	Winnipeg Maple Leafs	MHL	1	1	0	1	0	–	–	–	–	–
1910–11	Belleville	EOPHL	1	0	0	0	0	–	–	–	–	–
IPHL totals			62	70	8	78	68	–	–	–	–	–

Statistics per Society for International Hockey Research at sihrhockey.org
