= 1908 FHL season =

Fifth season of the Federal Hockey League

- League: Federal Hockey League
- Sport: Ice hockey
- Duration: 10 - 21 January 1908
- Number of games: 6+
- Number of teams: 4

Regular season

Stanley Cup
- Champions: Montreal Wanderers
- Runners-up: Ottawa Victorias

FHL seasons
- ← 1906-1907 1909 →

The 1908 Federal Hockey League (FHL) season was the fifth season of the league. After the death of Bud McCourt, and the resignations of teams from the league, the league had only three teams. The Ottawa Victorias and Cornwall Hockey Club returned from the previous year's teams. The league, previously amateur, was now composed of only professional teams, and billed itself as the 'Federal League.' The Renfrew Creamery Kings of the Upper Ottawa Valley Hockey League would play in the league with home games in Brockville, Ontario, playing as the Brockville team. This situation eventually caused the league to cease operations. Renfrew would return to the FAHL the following season, playing in Renfrew.

== Season ==
The season would not last a month. The league suspended play on 22 January 1908. Brockville, which employed the Renfrew team to play, notified the Cornwall club that they would not play a game on 23 January. The reason given was the refusal of the Ottawa Victorias to play against Renfrew wearing Brockville jerseys. The Renfrew club would continue in the Upper Ottawa Valley League, until it folded as well, then play exhibitions to finish the hockey season.

=== Results ===
| Month | Day | Visitor | Score | Home | Score |
|---|---|---|---|---|---|
| Jan. | 10 | Victorias | 2 | Cornwall | 4 |
| Jan. | 13 | Cornwall | 0 | Brockville | 12 |
| Jan. | 19 | Cornwall | 5 | Victorias | 8 |
| Jan. | 21‡ | Victorias | – | Brockville | – |

‡ Victorias refused to play Brockville team composed of Renfrew players.

== Stanley Cup challenge ==
During the season, as champions in 1907, the Victorias challenged the Stanley Cup champion Montreal Wanderers. The Victorias were no match for the Wanderers, losing two straight games in poor fashion.

=== Wanderers vs. Ottawa ===
The Wanderers would win 9–3, 13–1 (22–4).

| Date | Winning Team | Score | Losing Team | Location |
|---|---|---|---|---|
| 9 January 1908 | Montreal Wanderers | 9–3 | Ottawa Victorias | Montreal Arena |
| 13 January 1908 | Montreal Wanderers | 13–1 | Ottawa Victorias | Montreal Arena |
Montreal wins total goals series 22 goals to 4

== See also ==
- Federal Amateur Hockey League
- List of pre-NHL seasons
- List of ice hockey leagues

| Preceded by 1906–07 FAHL season | FAHL seasons 1908 | Succeeded by 1909 FHL season |
