= Tommy Smith (ice hockey) =

Canadian ice hockey player (1885–1966)

- Hockey Hall of Fame, 1973
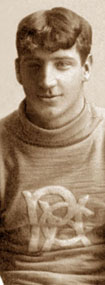
- Tommy Smith in 1907 with the Pittsburgh Professionals
- Born: September 27, 1885 Ottawa, Ontario, Canada
- Died: August 1, 1966 (aged 80) Ottawa, Ontario, Canada
- Height: 5 ft 6 in (168 cm)
- Weight: 150 lb (68 kg; 10 st 10 lb)
- Position: Centre
- Shot: Left
- Played for: Pittsburgh Professionals; Pittsburgh Lyceum; Pittsburgh Bankers; Ottawa Hockey Club; Brantford Indians; Galt Professionals; Moncton Victorias; Quebec Bulldogs; Toronto Shamrocks; Montreal Canadiens
- Playing career: 1905–1920

Thomas Joseph Smith (September 27, 1885 – August 1, 1966) was a Canadian professional ice hockey forward, who played from 1905 until 1920 for 16 teams in his career. He was a member of two Stanley Cup-winning teams, the Ottawa Silver Seven of 1906 and the Quebec Bulldogs of 1913. His two older brothers, Alf and Harry Smith, also played professional ice hockey.

== Playing career ==
Smith was born in Ottawa, Ontario, to Mr. and Mrs. Henry Smith, one of seven brothers who would play senior ice hockey. Smith began playing senior hockey as an amateur with the Ottawa Emmetts from 1903 until 1905. He joined the Ottawa Victorias of the Federal Amateur Hockey League (FAHL) in 1905-06 and also played for the Stanley Cup champion Ottawa Hockey Club, aka the "Silver Seven" that same year, playing with his older brothers Alf and Harry.

He moved to Pittsburgh to become a professional with the Pittsburgh Professionals in 1906, playing three seasons with the team before returning to Canada to join the Brantford Indians of the Ontario Professional Hockey League (OPHL). Smith played two seasons with Brantford but missed much of the 1909–10 season with typhoid fever. In 1910-11, he became a member of the Galt Professionals of the OPHL, helping Galt win the OPHL championship. Along with most of the Galt team, he bolted to the Moncton Victorias the following season, helping Moncton win the Maritime championship. The Galt and Moncton teams Smith was a member of played consecutive Stanley Cup challenges, Galt against Ottawa in 1911 and Moncton against Quebec in 1912, both times unsuccessfully.

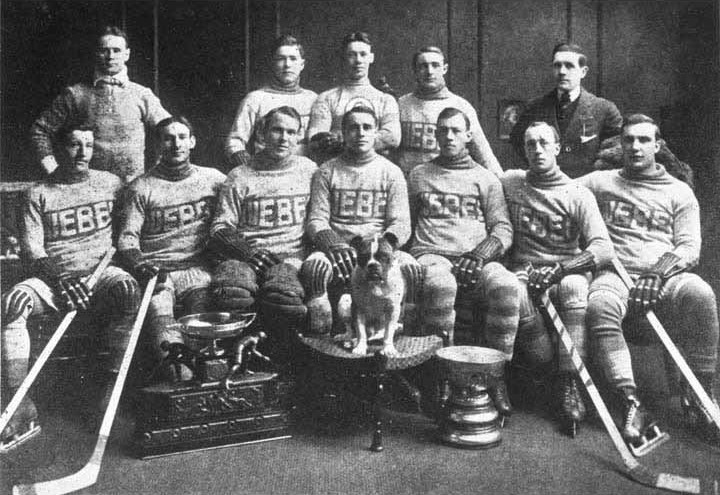
Smith, sitting far left, with the 1912–13 Quebec Bulldogs and the Stanley Cup.

Smith joined the Quebec Bulldogs for the 1912–13 season, where he won the Stanley Cup at the end of the season. After the 1913–14 season in Quebec, he was traded (twice) to Toronto Shamrocks. This caused a dispute with the Pacific Coast Hockey Association. At that time, the NHA and PCHA had an agreement whereby the PCHA teams could draft one player from three of the six teams of the NHA. He was traded away from Quebec, which was eligible to lose a player. He started playing for Shamrocks, though he had been drafted by Victoria of the PCHA. It was found that the initial trade was not allowed, and Quebec re-traded him to Toronto during the season, disregarding the PCHA's efforts to get him. During the 1914–15 season, he was traded back to Quebec, avoiding the PCHA draft again.

Much like his older brother Harry, Tommy Smith was a mercenary when it came to club loyalty, playing for many different teams both in Canada and in the United States. In December 1914, when he still had not reached terms with the Toronto Ontarios/Shamrocks franchise, he claimed the location where he played was secondary to the financial aspect of the game:

"There is a big margin between us, I'll play here or in Mexico if the money is strong enough. I don't care where I play. This story about my not wanting to play anywhere else but Ottawa is not correct."

While skating for the Ottawa Victorias in 1906, Smith led the FAHL with 12 goals (including eight goals in a game against Brockville on February 23, 1906). In future years, he was the leading goal-scorer in the OPHL (1908–09), the MPHA (1910–11), and the NHA (1913–14, 1914–15).

== Career statistics ==
=== Regular season and playoffs ===
			Regular season					Playoffs
Season	Team	League	GP	G	A	Pts	PIM	GP	G	A	Pts	PIM
1904–05	Ottawa Emmetts	OCHL	—	—	—	—	—	—	—	—	—	—
1905–06	Ottawa Victorias	FAHL	8	12	0	12	—	—	—	—	—	—
1905–06	Ottawa Senators	ECAHA	3	6	0	6	12	1	0	0	0	9
1906–07	Pittsburgh Professionals	IHL	23	31	13	44	47	—	—	—	—	—
1907–08	Pittsburgh Lyceum	WPHL	16	33	0	33	—	1	2	0	2	—
1908–09	Brantford Indians	OPHL	13	40	0	40	30	—	—	—	—	—
1908–09	Pittsburgh Lyceum	WPHL	6	15	0	15	—	—	—	—	—	—
1908–09	Pittsburgh Bankers	WPHL	—	—	—	—	—	7	3	1	4	14
1908–09	Haileybury Comets	TPHL	1	3	0	3	2	2	3	0	3	0
1909–10	Brantford Indians	OPHL	2	1	0	1	3	—	—	—	—	—
1910–11	Galt Professionals	OPHL	18	22	0	22	—	3	10	0	10	0
1910–11	Galt Professionals	St-Cup	—	—	—	—	—	1	1	0	1	—
1911–12	Moncton Victorias	MPHL	71	27	25	52	14	9	4	3	7	2
1911–12	Moncton Victorias	St-Cup	—	—	—	—	—	2	2	0	2	3
1912–13	Quebec Bulldogs	NHA	18	39	0	39	30	—	—	—	—	—
1912–13	Quebec Bulldogs	St-Cup	—	—	—	—	—	2	4	0	4	0
1913–14	Quebec Bulldogs	NHA	20	39	6	45	35	—	—	—	—	—
1914–15	Toronto Shamrocks	NHA	10	17	2	19	14	—	—	—	—	—
1914–15	Quebec Bulldogs	NHA	9	23	2	25	29	—	—	—	—	—
1915–16	Quebec Bulldogs	NHA	22	16	3	19	30	—	—	—	—	—
1916–17	Montreal Canadiens	NHA	14	7	4	11	32	2	2	0	2	11
1916–17	Montreal Canadiens	St-Cup	—	—	—	—	—	4	2	0	2	3
1917–18	Ottawa Transport	OCHL	—	—	—	—	—	—	—	—	—	—
1918–19	Glace Bay Miners	CBSHL	—	—	—	—	—	—	—	—	—	—
1919–20	Quebec Bulldogs	NHL	10	0	1	1	11	—	—	—	—	—
NHA totals			93	141	17	158	170	2	2	0	2	11
NHL totals			10	0	1	1	11	—	—	—	—	—

== Awards and achievements ==
- 1906 – Member of Stanley Cup champion Ottawa Silver Seven
- 1913 – Stanley Cup Champion with the Quebec Bulldogs
- 1973 – Inducted into the Hockey Hall of Fame
