= Teddy Groulx =

Canadian ice hockey player (1883–1936)

- Groulx in uniform of National lacrosse team
- Born: July 10, 1883; Ottawa, Ontario, Canada
- Died: April 20, 1936 (aged 52); Detroit, Michigan, U.S.
- Position: Goaltender
- Played for: Montreal Canadiens
- Playing career: 1906–1910

Joseph Edmond Groulx (July 10, 1883 – April 20, 1936) was a Canadian professional ice hockey player and lacrosse player. He played goal in 1910 with the Montreal Canadiens of the National Hockey Association.

== Biography ==
Groulx was a native of Ottawa and better known as a lacrosse player in that city. He was a forward with the intermediate French Canadian lacrosse club National (Club de Crosse National) from 1906 to 1908, when he broke his leg. He was a member of the 1905–06 team that was the Intermediate champions of Ottawa. A photo of Groulx with the team is held in the Canadian National Archives.

Groulx's teammates on the 1908 team included the future manager of the Montreal Canadiens hockey team, Joseph Cattarinich, and its early star player Didier Pitre. Cattarinich played goal in the newly formed hockey team's first game in January 1910. Teddy Groulx replaced him in goal for the rest of the 1910 season. In May 1910, Groulx joined the Ottawa Capitals lacrosse team as a forward.
