= 1905–06 FAHL season =

Canadian ice hockey league season

The 1905–06 Federal Amateur Hockey League (FAHL) season lasted from December 27, 1905, until February 28, 1906. Teams were to play an eight-game schedule, but due to the failure of the Montagnards, some teams played only 6 or 7 games.

== Regular season ==
With the loss of their top two teams, Ottawa and Wanderers, the quality of the FAHL declined. The teams were replaced with the Ottawa Victorias and Smiths Falls Seniors clubs.

=== Highlights ===
The Montagnards would be completely overwhelmed 26–0 by Brockville in their final game on February 2.

Otherwise, the season was low scoring, with the notable outstanding debut of goaltender Percy LeSueur of Smiths Falls.

=== Final standing ===
Note GP = Games Played, W = Wins, L = Losses, T = Ties, GF = Goals For, GA = Goals Against

Team	GP	W	L	T	GF	GA
Smiths Falls Seniors	7	7	0	0	44	16
Ottawa Victorias	8	4	4	0	52	44
Brockville HC	7	3	4	0	58	41
Cornwall HC	6	2	4	0	18	34
Montreal Montagnards	4	0	4	0	2	39

=== Results ===
Month	Day	Visitor	Score	Home	Score
December	27	Smiths Falls	1	Montagnards	0
January	1	Victorias	5	Cornwall	3
January	5	Cornwall	2	Brockville	4
January	10	Brockville	3	Smiths Falls	9
January	11	Victorias	3	Montagnards	0
January	19	Smiths Falls	8	Cornwall	1
January	20	Montagnards	2	Victorias	9
January	25	Victorias		Brockville	†
January	27	Cornwall		Montagnards	††
January	30	Victorias	2	Smiths Falls	6
February	2	Montagnards	0	Brockville	26
February	3	Cornwall	5	Victorias	4
February	9	Brockville	2	Cornwall	3
February	10	Smiths Falls	7	Victorias	4
February	13	Brockville		Montagnards	‡
February	15	Victorias	7	Brockville	11*
February	16	Cornwall	2	Smiths Falls	7
February	19	Smiths Falls	6	Brockville	4
February	23	Brockville	8	Victorias	14
February	23	Montagnards		Cornwall	‡
February	28	Montagnards		Smiths Falls	‡

† Postponed due to bad ice.

†† Postponed

‡ No result.

* Makeup for January 25 game.

== Player Stats ==
=== Scoring leaders ===
Note: GP = Games played, G = Goals scored

Name	Club	GP	G
Smith, Tommy	Victorias	8	12
Harrison, Bob	Victorias	8	12
Ross, Hugh	Smiths Falls	7	8
Throop, Art	Victorias	8	6
Brown, Harry	Smiths Falls	7	5
McCourt, Owen	Cornwall	6	5

=== Goaltender averages ===
Note: GP = Games played, GA = Goals against, SO = Shutouts, GAA = Goals against average

Name	Club	GP	GA	SO	GAA
Percy LeSueur	Smiths Falls	7	13	1	1.9
G. Annable	Cornwall	2	9	0	4.5
Bill Kerr	Brockville	7	32	0	4.6
George Airey	Cornwall	3	14	0	4.7
Bill Bannerman	Victorias	8	42	1	5.3
Zina Runions	Cornwall	1	7	0	7.0
Lou Wright	Montagnards	4	42	0	9.8

== Playoffs ==
After the season ended, Smiths Falls challenged the Ottawa Senators for the Stanley Cup. Ottawa would win the series 2–0. After the series, Ottawa would hire Percy LeSueur of the Smiths Falls team.

=== Smiths Falls vs. Ottawa ===
Date	Winning Team	Score	Losing Team	Location
March 6, 1906	Ottawa Senators	6–5	Smiths Falls	Dey's Arena
March 8, 1906	Ottawa Senators	8–2	Smiths Falls	Dey's Arena
Ottawa wins best-of-three series 2 games to 0

== See also ==
- Federal Amateur Hockey League
- List of Stanley Cup champions
- List of pre-NHL seasons
- List of ice hockey leagues

Preceded by 1904–05 FAHL season	FAHL seasons 1905–06	Succeeded by 1906–07 FAHL season
