= Charles Masson (ice hockey) =

Canadian ice hockey player

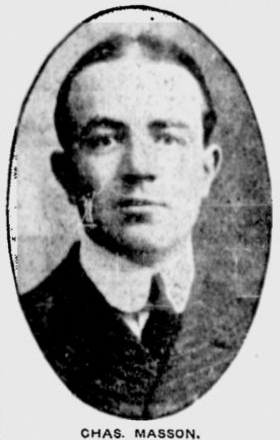
- Born: September 12, 1884 Ottawa, Ontario, Canada
- Died: October 17, 1954 (aged 70) Toronto, Ontario, Canada
- Position: Right wing
- Shot: Right
- Played for: Ottawa Victorias; Pittsburgh Pirates
- Playing career: c. 1901–1911

Charles Eadie Masson Charles Masson (September 12, 1884 – October 17, 1954) was a Canadian amateur ice hockey right winger who played in the early 1900s. He played for clubs including the Ottawa Victorias of the Federal Amateur Hockey League. Born in Ottawa, Ontario, he was the son of former City of Ottawa alderman Donald T. Masson.

== Owen McCourt incident ==
During the 1906–07 FAHL season, Masson was involved in a fatal incident. On March 6, 1907, during a game between Masson's Ottawa Victorias and the Cornwall Hockey Club at the Victoria rink in Cornwall, Masson struck Cornwall's Owen "Bud" McCourt in the head with his stick. McCourt died of his injuries the following morning. As a result of the incident, Masson was tried, initially for murder and later for manslaughter, but was acquitted on both counts.
