= Montreal Le National =

Ice hockey team

Le National de Montreal
- Founded: 1895
- History: Montreal Nationals 1895–1900 (independent); 1901 (I-CAHL); 1902–1903 (independent); 1904* (FAHL); 1905 (CAHL); 1906 (independent); 1907–1908 (dormant); 1909–10 (CHA); 1910–11 (MCHL); 1911–12 (IAHU); 1912–13 – 1913–14 (independent); 1914–15 – 1917–18 (MCHL); 1918–19 (MHL); 1919–20 – 1922–23 (MCHL); 1923–24 – 1924–25 (ECAHL); 1925–26 (SGHL) Montreal/St. Francois Nationals; 1926–27 (SGHL) *For this season the team merged with the Montreal Montagnards.
- City: Montreal, Quebec
- Team colours: Blue and White
- Stanley Cups: 0

The Montreal Nationals (Le National de Montreal) were an amateur, later professional, and then amateur again men's senior-level ice hockey team. They are notable in that they were the first team to represent French Canada and were the first ice hockey team composed of francophone players. In 1910 during the first season of the National Hockey Association (the forerunner to the National Hockey League), they were offered a chance to replace the brand new Montreal Canadiens being as they were the established French Canadian club, but would refuse and return to their amateur roots playing in various amateur senior leagues.

== Senior team ==
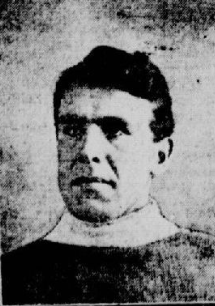
Montreal Nationals player Ernie Dubeau in 1909–10

The Nationals organization was established in 1894. They iced their first team in 1895, being the first club composed of francophone players. After a few years of independent play against other established clubs, they briefly played in the Intermediate Canadian Amateur Hockey League (I-CAHL) in 1901. They then entered the Federal Amateur Hockey League (FAHL) in 1904 when Le National and the Montreal Montagnards fielded a joint team for that season. The following season, the agreement with Le Montagnard fell apart after Didier Pitre and Jack Laviolette left to play professional hockey in Michigan with the American Soo, so the Nationals joined the Canadian Amateur Hockey League (CAHL) in 1905. After flirting with these organized leagues (the Nationals more often than not preferred to play challenge games as an independent), they joined the brand new Canadian Hockey Association (CHA) in 1909–10 as a professional entity.

After the CHA essentially merged with the National Hockey Association, the Nationals were offered a chance to join the NHA replacing the newly established Montreal Canadiens as the French-Canadian entity in that league, but opted not to. The club then returned to their amateur roots by joining the Montreal City Hockey League (MCHL) in 1910–11 and briefly played in the rival Montreal Hockey League (MHL) as well as the Interprovincial Amateur Hockey Union (IPAHU), before returning to the MCHL in 1919. They stayed with that league through its various name changes (the Eastern Canada Amateur Hockey League in 1923 and the Senior Group Hockey League in 1925). For their final season in 1926–27, the Montreal Nationals merged with the intermediate Montreal St. Francois Xavier Hockey Club to form the Montreal/St. Francois Nationals. After that one season, the club finally folded.

== Junior team ==
The Montreal Nationals organization also iced a junior team alongside the more popular senior team in 1920. The team played in the Junior Amateur Hockey Association (JAHA). The team was shut down in 1925 but reactivated in 1944. In 1949, the league was renamed the Quebec Junior Hockey League. The team was shut down again in 1952 but reactivated one final time in 1956 in the Metropolitan Montreal Junior Hockey League. In 1958 the club was renamed the Palestre Nationals. In 1969, the MMJHL merged with the Quebec Junior Hockey League to form the Quebec Major Junior Hockey League. That year the team moved out to the Montreal borough of Rosemont to become the Rosemont Nationals. In 1971, the club moved out to the Montreal suburb of Laval to become the Laval Nationals. In 1975, after 50 years of operation, the Montreal Nationals organization folded. The team still used the Nationals name for the next few seasons, but after coach Jean Rougeau left the club they were renamed the Laval Voisins. Today the club is the Acadie–Bathurst Titan.

== Lacrosse ==
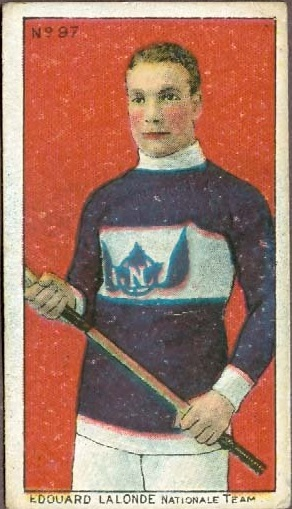
A 1910 Imperial Tobacco trading card featuring Newsy Lalonde playing for the Montreal Nationals lacrosse team. When an organization had both lacrosse and hockey teams, it was common for players to play for both teams.

As well as their hockey team, the Montreal Nationals also had a lacrosse team, which was actually established first, in 1894. In 1897, they won the intermediate league, and in 1898 the senior league. Becoming professional in 1910, they won the Eastern Canada championship, but lost the Minto Cup to New Westminster in the Canadian championship.

== Prominent players ==
- Jack Laviolette
- Didier Pitre
- Newsy Lalonde
- Joe Cattarinich

== See also ==
- 1904 FAHL season
- Montreal Canadiens
- Montreal Montagnards
