= 1910 NHA season =

Professional ice hockey season

- League: National Hockey Association
- Sport: Ice hockey
- Duration: January 5 – March 15, 1910
- Games: 12
- Teams: 7

Regular season
- Top scorer: Newsy Lalonde, Montreal Canadiens (38)

O'Brien Cup
- Champions: Montreal Wanderers
- Runners-up: Ottawa Hockey Club

NHA seasons
- ← 1909 (ECHA) 1910–11 →

The 1910 NHA season was the first season of the National Hockey Association men's professional ice hockey league. The season started on January 5, but was suspended immediately and the league then absorbed the Ottawa and Shamrocks teams of the Canadian Hockey Association and the season continued from January 15 to March 15. Seven teams played 12 games each. The Ottawa Hockey Club played two Stanley Cup challenges during the season, but lost the Cup to their rivals the Montreal Wanderers who won the league championship and played a Cup challenge afterwards.

== League business ==
After the Canadian Hockey Association (CHA) turned down the Wanderers' application to join, Wanderers' manager Jimmy Gardner, along with Renfrew's Ambrose O'Brien worked to put together enough teams to form a league. Gardner approached the Ottawa Senators of the Federal League to have an Ottawa entry, but the players decided to fold the team, rather than compete with the Ottawa Hockey Club. Gardner also approached the Mutual Street Rink of Toronto to form a professional team, but was turned down as the rink was fully booked.

According to Leo Dandurand, he spoke with Ambrose O'Brien on the occasion of the 50th anniversary of the founding of the NHA and the Canadiens and Mr. O'Brien said the league was founded on December 3, 1909, at a private meeting at St. Lawrence Hall Hotel in Montreal, Quebec, Canada. It was disclosed to the public the next day at the Windsor Hotel. At the December 3 meeting four franchises were approved:

- Wanderers (represented by P. J. Doran, R. R. Boon, Jimmy Gardner)
- Renfrew (represented by Ambrose O'Brien, George E. Martel, Jim Barnett)
- Cobalt (Thomas C. Hare)
- Haileybury (Noah Timmins)
- Canadiens (fronted by Ambrose O'Brien)

Eddie McCafferty acted as secretary, and he also was representative of interests in Toronto. A franchise would be held for a future Toronto team. The NHA discussed organizing a team in Ottawa with the Ottawa Lacrosse Club and getting Montreal Le National to join the NHA. The Wanderers and Renfrew signed a pact not to merge with the CHA unless Cobalt and Haileybury were also admitted. The teams pledged a $1,000 bond to stay together.

Former Canadiens owner Léo Dandurand later wrote that a decisive follow-up meeting in the creation of the NHA took place on December 3, 1909 at St. Lawrence Hall Hotel on Saint-Jacques Street, where Jimmy Strachan urged J. Ambrose O’Brien to form an all-French-Canadian club in Montreal.

On December 4, the NHA held an organizing meeting at the Windsor Hotel in Montreal. The CHA was meeting at the hotel also, and a message was sent to the Ottawa, Shamrocks and Le National teams to seek a merged seven-team league. This was turned down by the CHA, which would not accept Cobalt and Haileybury. The CHA proposed that Renfrew and Wanderers join the CHA, but the NHA teams turned that proposal down.

An executive was elected:

- President – M. Doheney, Renfrew
- Vice-President – Thomas C. Hare, Cobalt
- Sec.-Treasurer – E. John McCafferty
- Executive – J. Ambrose O'Brien, Slaght, Boon, Jack Laviolette and Thomas C. Hare

At the meeting, a franchise for 'Les Canadiens' was granted, to be organized by Jack Laviolette. Mr. Hare of Cobalt put up a security deposit for the franchise on the understanding that it would be transferred to Montreal French sportsmen as soon as possible.

The NHA decided to run the league in a more business-like manner. The league decided to write a standard player's contract. McCafferty, who was also secretary of the Montreal Baseball Club, was to draw up the contract. The NHA also decided to have professional referees. Both of these were innovations in the world of ice hockey.

== Regular season ==
The first Canadiens game ever took place on January 5 under a cloud. Didier Pitre had signed a contract with both the Canadiens and the Nationals. Pitre was risking a $2,000 fine and 60 days jail time. The Nationals had a legal injunction against Pitre playing for the Canadiens. This contributed to an over-capacity crowd at the Jubilee Rink of about 5,000. Pitre did play (he was guaranteed any fines by Canadiens' management) and court action commenced. Pitre was found not to have a binding contract with the Nationals by the courts. By this time, the CHA had folded, and no contract was enforceable. Pitre would have a long career with the Canadiens, playing into the 1920s.

On January 15, a meeting was held by the league executive and Ottawa and Montreal Shamrocks were admitted to the NHA. The games played before that date were thrown out, and games from that date forwards counted towards the final standings.

On January 22, at a game between Renfrew and Shamrocks, Shamrock's Joe Hall was ejected for striking the judge-of-play Rod Kennedy. After regulation time, the game was tied. Referee Tom Hodge proposed that Hall return for the overtime, but Renfrew objected and did not play the overtime. Hall was later fined $100 for the incident and suspended until January 30. The game was ordered replayed but wasn't due to ice conditions and the game results were accepted as a tie.

On Cyclone Taylor's first return to Ottawa as a member of the Renfrew team, he made his famous promise to score a goal backwards against Ottawa. This led to incredible interest, with over 7000 in attendance. A bet of $100 was placed at the King Edward Hotel against him scoring at all. The Senators would win 8–5 (3 goals in overtime) and more importantly keep Taylor off the scoresheet. Later in the season at the return match in Renfrew, Taylor made good on his boast with a goal scored backwards. This was the final game of the season, and the Senators had no chance at the league title, and don't appear to have put in an effort, losing 17–2.

=== Final standing ===
Note GP = Games Played, W = Wins, L = Losses, T = Ties, GF = Goals For, GA = Goals Against

Team	GP	W	L	T	GF	GA
Montreal Wanderers	12	11	1	0	91	41
Ottawa Hockey Club	12	9	3	0	89	66
Renfrew Creamery Kings	12	8	3	1	96	54
Cobalt Silver Kings	12	4	8	0	79	104
Haileybury Hockey Club	12	4	8	0	77	83
Montreal Shamrocks	12	3	8	1	52	95
Les Canadiens	12	2	10	0	59	100

=== Results ===
Month	Day	Visitor	Score	Home	Score
Jan.	5	Cobalt	6 †	Canadiens	7 (OT 5'35")
Jan.	8	Cobalt	6	Wanderers	10 †
Jan.	12	Cobalt	11	Renfrew	9 †
Jan.	15	Renfrew	2	Wanderers	7
Jan.	15	Shamrocks	3	Ottawa HC	15
Jan.	18	Cobalt	7	Haileybury HC	6 (OT 3')
Jan.	19	Canadiens	4	Renfrew	9
Jan.	22	Canadiens	4	Ottawa HC	6
Jan.	22‡	Renfrew	1	Shamrocks	1
Jan.	22	Wanderers	2	Haileybury HC	4
Jan.	25	Wanderers	11	Cobalt	6
Jan.	25	Haileybury HC	2	Shamrocks	3 (OT 30")
Jan.	26	Ottawa HC	8	Canadiens	4
Jan.	28	Shamrocks	2	Renfrew	10
Jan.	29	Haileybury HC	4	Ottawa HC	11
Feb.	1	Haileybury HC	3	Wanderers	8
Feb.	2	Canadiens	3	Shamrocks	8
Feb.	4	Haileybury HC	3	Renfrew	6
Feb.	5	Shamrocks	1	Wanderers	10
Feb.	5	Ottawa HC	5	Cobalt	4
Feb.	7	Haileybury HC	5	Canadiens	9
Feb.	9	Wanderers	11	Shamrocks	6
Feb.	9	Ottawa	8	Haileybury HC	4
Feb.	12	Shamrocks	6	Haileybury HC	12
Feb.	12	Renfrew	5	Ottawa HC	8 (OT 10')
Feb.	12	Wanderers	9	Canadiens	4
Feb.	15	Shamrocks	4	Cobalt	11
Feb.	15	Renfrew	8	Canadiens	6
Feb.	19	Ottawa HC	5	Wanderers	7
Feb.	19	Renfrew	12	Cobalt	7
Feb.	22	Renfrew	11	Haileybury HC	5
Feb.	23	Ottawa HC	9	Shamrocks	6
Feb.	24	Canadiens	7	Cobalt	11
Feb.	25	Wanderers	5	Renfrew	0
Feb.	26	Cobalt	5	Ottawa HC	11
Feb.	26	Canadiens	3	Haileybury HC	15
Mar.	2	Cobalt	3	Wanderers	7
Mar.	5	Wanderers	3	Ottawa HC	1
Mar.	5	Cobalt	6	Canadiens	4
Mar.	8	Cobalt	6	Shamrocks	8
Mar.	8	Ottawa HC	2	Renfrew	17
Mar.	9	Canadiens	6	Wanderers	11
Mar.	11	Shamrocks	4	Canadiens	5 (OT 12')
Mar.	11	Cobalt	4	Renfrew	15
Mar.	15	Haileybury HC	14	Cobalt	9

† Games played before January 15, which were played before the CHA teams joined were not counted against the final standings.

‡ The January 22 game was abandoned due to an on-ice incident. It was ordered replayed on March 2 in Ottawa, but wasn't played due to soft ice in Ottawa.

== Player statistics ==
=== Scoring leaders ===
Note: GP = Games played, G = Goals scored, PIM = Penalties in minutes

Name	Club	GP	G	PIM
Newsy Lalonde	Montreal Canadiens; Renfrew Hockey Club	11	38	56
Ernie Russell	Montreal Wanderers	12	32	51
Harry Smith	Cobalt Silver Kings; Haileybury Hockey Club	12	32	26
Lester Patrick	Renfrew	12	24	25
Harry Hyland	Montreal Wanderers	11	20	23
Herb Clarke	Cobalt Silver Kings	12	20	27
Horace Gaul	Haileybury HC	12	20	53
Marty Walsh	Ottawa HC	11	19	44
Steve Vair	Cobalt Silver Kings	12	17	8
Bruce Ridpath	Ottawa HC	12	16	32

=== Goaltending averages ===
Note: GP = Games played, GA = Goals against, SO = Shutouts, GAA = Goals against average

Name	Club	GP	GA	SO	GAA
Billy Nicholson	Haileybury	1	3		3.0
Riley Hern	Wanderers	12	41	1	3.4
Bert Lindsay	Renfrew	12	54		4.5
Jack Winchester	Shamrocks	5	26		5.2
Percy LeSueur	Ottawa HC	12	66	1	5.5
Paddy Moran	Haileybury HC	11	80		7.3
George Broughton	Shamrocks	5	43		8.6
Joe Cattarinich	Canadiens	3	23		7.7
Teddy Groulx	Canadiens	9	77		8.6
Chief Jones	Cobalt	12	104		8.7
Bill Baker	Shamrocks	2	26		13.0

== Stanley Cup challenges ==
During the season, Ottawa, as Cup champion, played a challenge against Edmonton Hockey Club in addition to their regular schedule. They had played a challenge during the CHA season against Galt.

=== Ottawa vs. Edmonton ===
Edmonton was champion of the Alberta Amateur Hockey Association.

January 18, 1910
Edmonton	4		Ottawa	8
Jack Winchester		G	Percy LeSueur	
William Field		P	Fred Lake	
Hugh Ross		CP	Hamby Shore	
Fred Whitcroft	2	RO	Bruce Stuart, Capt.	2
Harold Deeton	1	C	Marty Walsh	1
Hay Millar	1	RW	Gordon Roberts	4
Bert Boulton		LW	Bruce Ridpath	1
Referees – Bowie & Campbell

January 20, 1910
Edmonton	7		Ottawa	13
Jack Winchester		G	Percy LeSueur	
William Field		P	Fred Lake	
Hugh Ross		CP	Hamby Shore	1
Fred Whitcroft	3	RO	Bruce Stuart, Capt.	5
Harold Deeton	2	C	Marty Walsh	1
Hay Millar		RW	Gordon Roberts	3
Bert Boulton	2	LW	Bruce Ridpath	3
Referees – Bowie & Campbell

=== NHA league champions take over Stanley Cup ===
The Wanderers won the championship of the NHA and took possession of the Stanley Cup from Ottawa. They had a challenge from Berlin, champions of the Ontario Professional Hockey League and easily defeated them. For 1910, there would be two Stanley Cup holders, Ottawa which held and defended it until March, and Montreal for the rest of the year.

=== Wanderers vs. Berlin ===
March 12, 1910
Berlin	3		Wanderers	7
Hugh Lehman, Capt.		G	William "Riley" Hern	
Albert Seibert	1	P	Jack Marshall	
Harvey Corbeau	1	CP	Ernie Johnson	
Edward "Toad" Edmunds		RO	Frank "Pud" Glass, Capt.	
Roy Anderson		C	Harry Hyland	3
Ezra Dumart		RW	Ernie Russell	4
Oren Frood	1	LW	Jimmy Gardner	
Referees – Bowie & Kirby

== NHA exhibitions at New York ==
After the season, the NHA arranged an 'international championship' at New York City's St. Nicholas Rink. Like the previous spring, Ottawa and Wanderers played a two-game series in New York for a purse of US$1,500 (equivalent to $51,830 in 2025). Wanderers won both games 4–3. Renfrew next travelled to New York and defeated the Wanderers in a single game for US$1,000 (equivalent to $34,554 in 2025).

Date	Winning Team	Score	Losing Team
March 15, 1910	Montreal Wanderers	4–3	Ottawa HC
March 16, 1910	Montreal Wanderers	4–3	Ottawa HC
March 19, 1910	Renfrew	9–4	Montreal Wanderers

- "Wanderers Won at New York". The Globe. March 16, 1910. p. 9.
- "Wanderers Won Again". The Globe. March 17, 1910. p. 9.
- "Renfrew 9, Wandererers 4". The Globe. March 21, 1910. p. 9.

== Stanley Cup engraving ==
The 1910 Stanley Cup was presented by the trophy's trustee William Foran. The Wanderers never did engrave their names on the Cup for their championship season.

The following Wanderers players and staff were members of the Stanley Cup winning team.

1910 Montreal Wanderers
Players
Forwards
Frank "Pud" Glass (rover-Captain)
Jack Marshall (center)
Bill Chipchase (left wing)
Jimmy Gardner (left wing)
Ernie Russell (right wing)
Harry Hyland (left wing-center)
Defencemen
Cecil Blachford (point)
Ernie "Moose" Johnson (cover-point)
Goaltender
William "Riley" Hern

non-players =

- Filbert Strachan (President)
- Dickie Boon (Manager)
- Robert "Bob" Stephanson (Vice President)
- Dr. Walter Dorion (Director)
- Paul Lefebvre (Trainer)

engraving-notes =

- Montreal Wanderers did not put their name on the Stanley Cup. When the trophy was redesigned in 1948, the words "1910 Montreal Wanderers" were put onto its then-new collar.

== See also ==
- Canadian Hockey Association
- List of pre-NHL seasons
- 1909 in sports
- 1910 in sports
- List of Stanley Cup champions

Preceded by Ottawa; January 1910	Montreal Wanderers; Stanley Cup Champions; March 1910	Succeeded by Ottawa; 1911
Preceded by 1909–10 CHA season 1909 ECAHA season	NHA seasons 1910	Succeeded by 1910–11 NHA season
