= Jack Laviolette =

Canadian ice hockey player (1879–1960)

- Hockey Hall of Fame, 1963
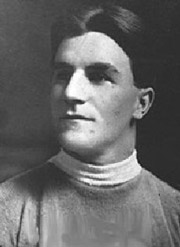
- Born: July 27, 1879 Belleville, Ontario, Canada
- Died: January 10, 1960 (aged 80) Montreal, Quebec, Canada
- Height: 5 ft 11 in (180 cm)
- Weight: 170 lb (77 kg; 12 st 2 lb)
- Position: Defence/Winger
- Shot: Right
- Played for: Montreal Le National; Michigan Soo Indians; Montreal Shamrocks; Montreal Canadiens
- Playing career: 1903–1918

Jean-Baptiste "Jack" Laviolette (July 27, 1879 – January 10, 1960) was a Canadian professional ice hockey player. Laviolette played nine seasons for the Montreal Canadiens hockey club and was their first captain, coach, and general manager.

Laviolette was one of the first francophone ice hockey stars. He was born in Belleville, Ontario, but grew up in Valleyfield, Quebec. He was a solid scorer from the defenceman position, but Laviolette's true place in hockey history has less to do with his scoring prowess and more to do with his role as a founding organizer of the Canadiens hockey club. He was their first player, coach, and general manager in their inaugural 1910 season.

With the formation of the National Hockey Association (NHA) in December 1909, (replaced 7 years later by the NHL), team/league owner Ambrose O'Brien asked Laviolette to put together a team made up of French Canadian players to play as the "Les Canadiens" franchise in Montreal. Laviolette completed the task in time for the NHA's inaugural season. Among those that would sign on to that first team would be future hall of famers Newsy Lalonde, Didier Pitre. The team he built would go on to be the most successful franchise in professional hockey.

== Playing career ==
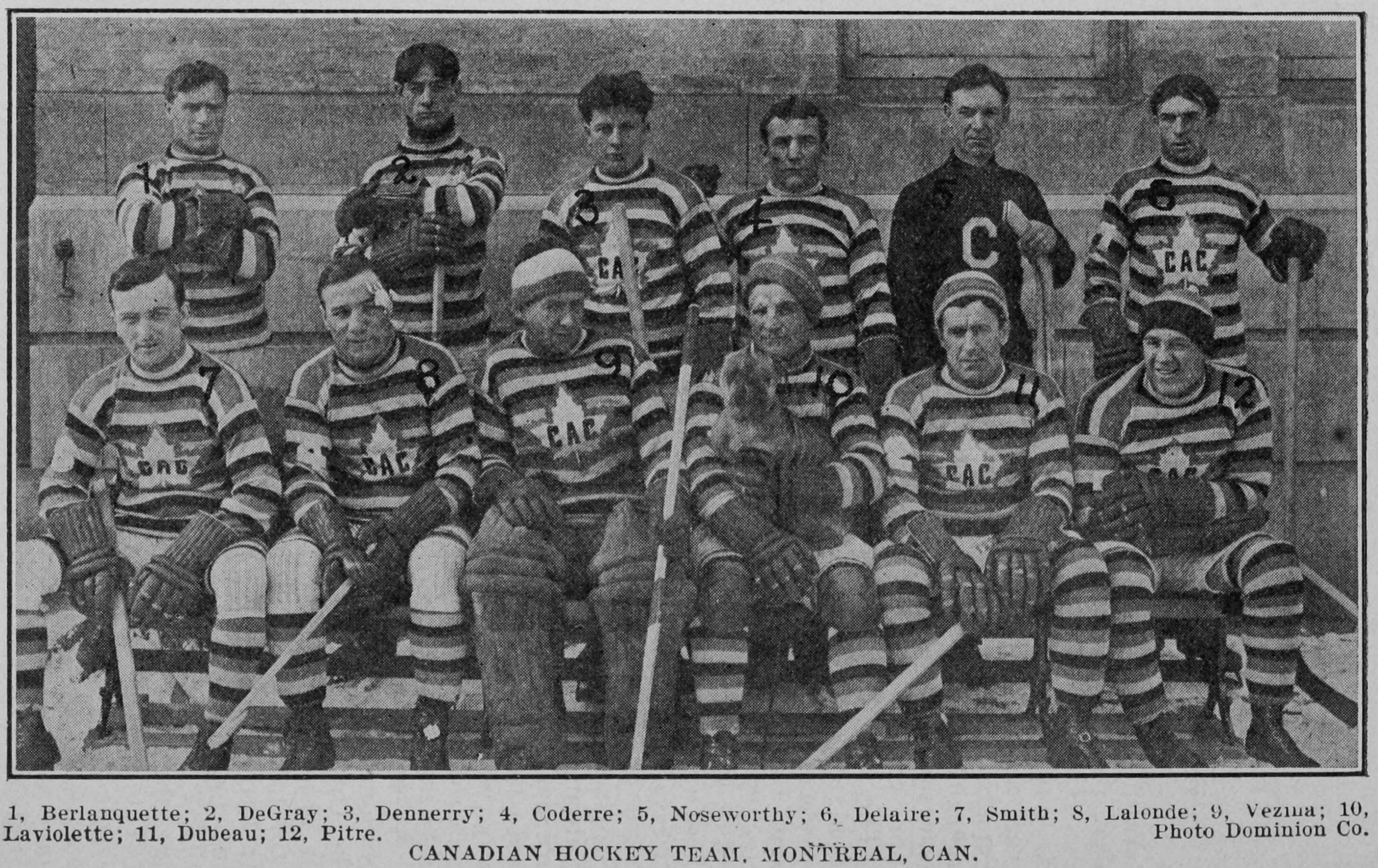
Laviolette, front row holding a dog, with the 1912–13 Montreal Canadiens.

Laviolette first played elite-level senior men's amateur hockey in 1904 for the Montreal Le National, famous for being one of the first men's teams composed of francophones. From 1905 onward, he played as a professional, first with the Michigan Soo Indians of the International Professional Hockey League for three seasons, and then returned to Montreal to play for Montreal Shamrocks in the 1908 and 1909 seasons. A teammate of Laviolette on all of those teams was forward Didier Pitre.

He then starred for the new Montreal Canadiens franchise from 1910 until 1918, both in the NHA and the NHL, scoring 51 goals in 156 games, and winning the Stanley Cup in 1916.

Laviolette lost his right foot in an automobile accident on May 1, 1918, ending his playing career. A benefit game for Laviolette was arranged at the Mount Royal Arena in 1921. He was the guest of honour, and also refereed.

== Playing style ==
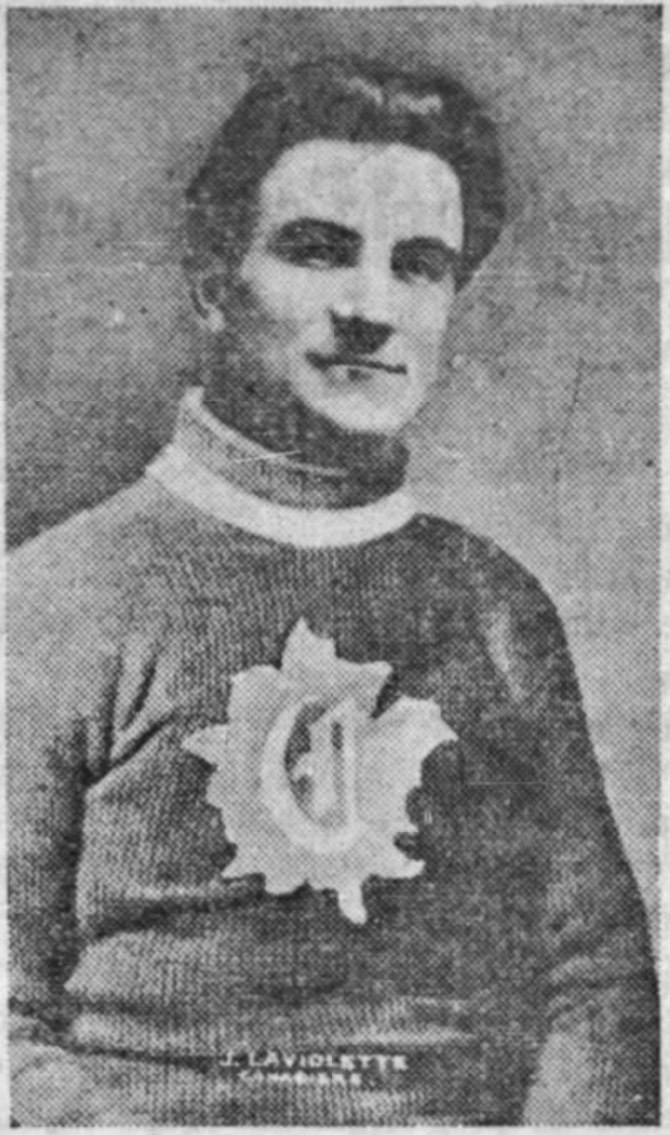
Laviolette with the Montreal Canadiens.

"Jack could skate backwards as fast as most skaters could, or can, skate forward."

— Lester Patrick on Jack Laviolette in 1928.

Primarily a defenceman position wise, Laviolette was renowned for his strong skating and his marvelous speed, which helped dub the Montreal Canadiens team The Flying Frenchmen. He would occasionally also play as a forward.

Player, coach, and executive Lester Patrick, who was a contemporary player of Laviolette and later a coach in the NHL with the New York Rangers, claimed that Laviolette could skate as fast backward as most other players could skate forward. On the other hand, despite Laviolette having solid goal-scoring upside both as a defenceman and as a forward, Patrick also claimed that Laviolette "lacked a sense of direction" to his game, which he claimed hindered him from reaching the superstar status of his fellow Montreal teammates Didier Pitre and Newsy Lalonde.

Laviolette was known as a clean and gentlemanly player, both in hockey and on the lacrosse field, which combined with his genial disposition on and off the sports venues made him a popular character in the various sports circuits. Outside of hockey and lacrosse, his fascination for speed also brought his attention to motorcycle racing and flying machines.

== Career statistics ==
			Regular season					Playoffs
Season	Team	League	GP	G	A	Pts	PIM	GP	G	A	Pts	PIM
1903–04	Montreal Nationals	FAHL	6	8	0	8	—	—	—	—	—	—
1904–05	Michigan Soo Indians	IHL	24	15	0	15	24	—	—	—	—	—
1905–06	Michigan Soo Indians	IHL	17	15	0	15	28	—	—	—	—	—
1906–07	Michigan Soo Indians	IHL	19	10	7	17	34	—	—	—	—	—
1907–08	Montreal Shamrocks	ECAHA	6	1	0	1	36	—	—	—	—	—
1908–09	Montreal Shamrocks	ECHA	9	1	0	1	36	—	—	—	—	—
1909–10	Montreal Canadiens	NHA	12	4	0	4	41	—	—	—	—	—
1910–11	Montreal Canadiens	NHA	16	0	0	0	24	—	—	—	—	—
1911–12	Montreal Canadiens	NHA	17	7	0	7	10	—	—	—	—	—
1912–13	Montreal Canadiens	NHA	20	8	0	8	77	—	—	—	—	—
1913–14	Montreal Canadiens	NHA	20	7	9	16	30	2	0	1	1	0
1914–15	Montreal Canadiens	NHA	18	6	3	9	35	—	—	—	—	—
1915–16	Montreal Canadiens	NHA	18	8	3	11	62	—	—	—	—	—
1915–16	Montreal Canadiens	St-Cup	—	—	—	—	—	4	0	0	0	6
1916–17	Montreal Canadiens	NHA	17	7	3	10	24	—	—	—	—	—
1916–17	Montreal Canadiens	St-Cup	—	—	—	—	—	4	1	2	3	9
1917–18	Montreal Canadiens	NHL	18	2	1	3	6	2	0	0	0	0
IHL totals			60	40	7	47	86	—	—	—	—	—
NHA totals			138	47	18	65	303	4	0	1	1	0
St-Cup totals			—	—	—	—	—	8	1	2	3	15

== Awards and achievements ==
- 1904–05, 06–07 – First All-Star Right Wing, IPHL
- 1915–16 – Stanley Cup champion
- 1960 – Inducted into Canada's Sports Hall of Fame
- 1963 – Inducted into the Hockey Hall of Fame

Preceded by Position created	Head coach of the Montreal Canadiens; 1910–11	Succeeded by Adolphe Lecours
Preceded by Position created	Montreal Canadiens captain 1910	Succeeded by Newsy Lalonde
Preceded by Newsy Lalonde	Montreal Canadiens captain 1911–12	Succeeded by Newsy Lalonde
Preceded by Position created	General Manager of the Montreal Canadiens; 1909–10 with Joseph Cattarinich	Succeeded by George Kennedy
