= Guy Smith (ice hockey, born 1892) =

Canadian ice hockey player

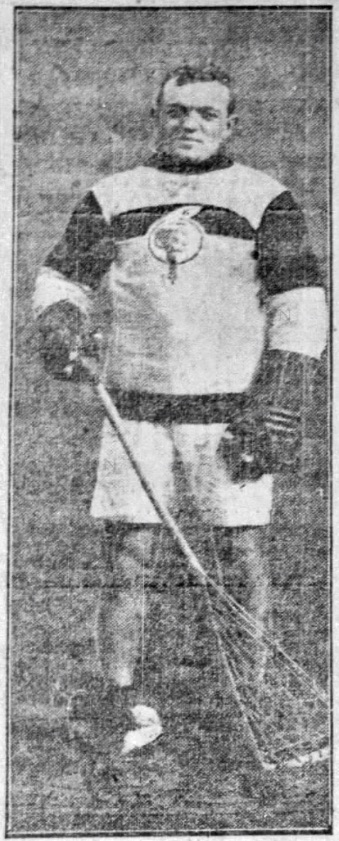
- Smith as a lacrosse player with the Toronto Tecumsehs
- Born: August 7, 1892 Cornwall, Ontario, Canada
- Died: November 24, 1951 (aged 59) Hamilton, Ontario, Canada
- Height: 5 ft 6 in (168 cm)
- Weight: 160 lb (73 kg; 11 st 6 lb)
- Position: Left wing
- Shot: Left
- Played for: Toronto Ontarios
- Playing career: 1909–1922

Guy Smith (August 7, 1892 – November 24, 1951) was a Canadian professional lacrosse and ice hockey player from Cornwall, Ontario. He played with the Toronto Ontarios of the National Hockey Association during the 1913–14 NHA season. He was also a member of the Toronto Tecumsehs lacrosse team.

He was a younger brother of ice hockey player Don Smith.

Guy Smith moved to Hamilton, Ontario in the early 1920s and died on a train pulling out from Hamilton on November 24, 1951, aged 59, en route to Toronto to watch the 39th Grey Cup game between the Ottawa Rough Riders and Saskatchewan Roughriders.
