= Chief Jones =

Canadian ice hockey player

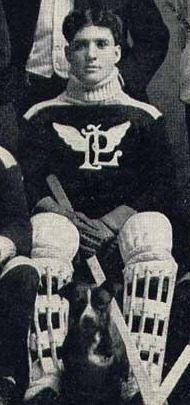
- "Chief" Joseph Jones with the Portage Lakes Hockey Club in 1902–03
- Born: December 18, 1879; Renfrew, Ontario, Canada
- Died: October 30, 1959 (aged 79)
- Height: 6 ft 0 in (183 cm)
- Weight: 205 lb (93 kg; 14 st 9 lb)
- Position: Goaltender
- Caught: Right
- Played for: St. Paul Victorias; Portage Lake-Houghton HC; Michigan Soo Indians; Cobalt Silver Kings; Waterloo Colts
- Playing career: 1902–1914

Joseph Henry "Chief" Jones (December 18, 1879 – October 30, 1959) was a Canadian-American professional ice hockey goaltender who played in various professional and amateur leagues during the first decade of the 1900s, including the National Hockey Association (NHA) and International Professional Hockey League (IPHL). He was a "full blooded Indian" who hailed from Michigan.

== Career ==
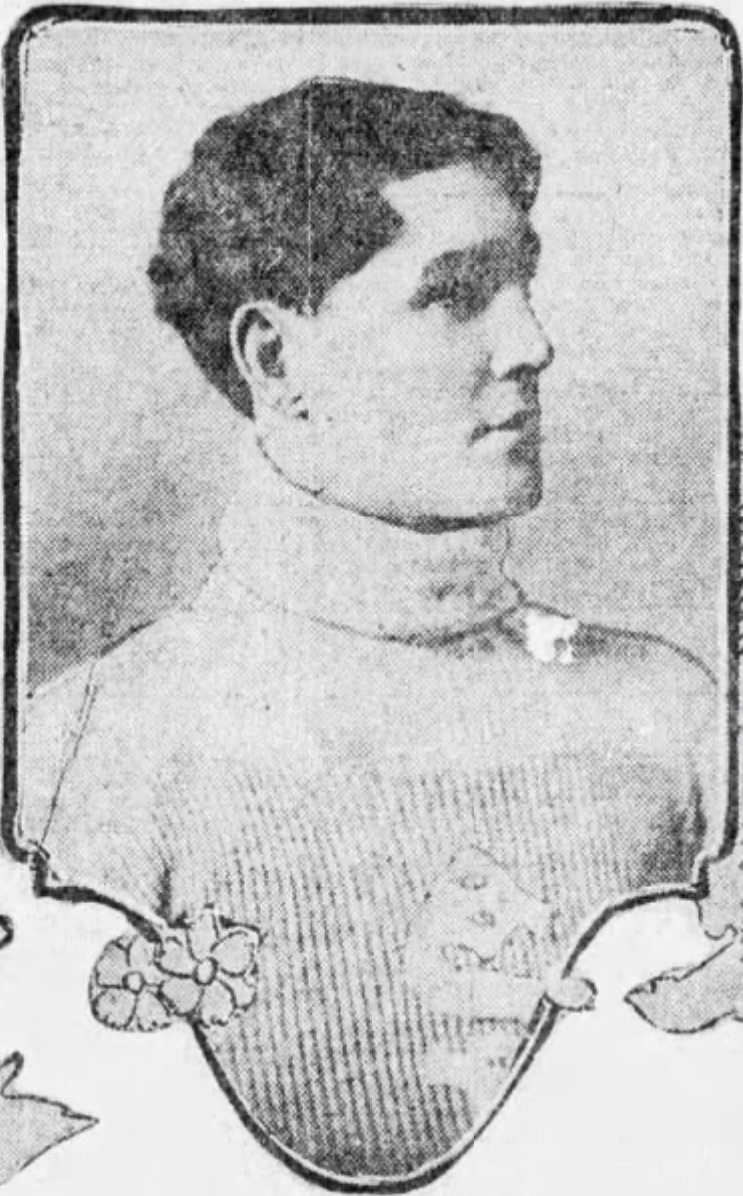
Jones with the Michigan Soo

Amongst the teams Jones played with during his career in professional hockey were the Cobalt Silver Kings of the NHA and TPHL, and the Waterloo Colts of the OPHL. Before he played with Cobalt and Waterloo, he had started out his career in Port Arthur, Ontario in 1901. He also played with the St. Paul Victorias in St. Paul, Minnesota and in the International Professional Hockey League with a team in Sault Ste. Marie, Michigan, the Michigan Soo Indians, from the league's inaugural year in 1904–05 to 1906–07, and then independently until the 1907–08 season, when he signed with the Cobalt Hockey Club. He played for Waterloo in the OPHL the following hockey season. He retired after that season.

After his playing career was finished, Jones took to coaching. In 1914–15, he was coaching a team in Detroit. At the onset of the season, Jones described for the Detroit Free Press that his own success as a goaltender had relied on him not waiting for the puck to come to him, but to instead go out to meet the object of play.

== Career statistics ==
=== Regular season ===
Season	Team	League	GP	W	L	T/OTL	MIN	GA	GAA	SV%	SO
1902–03	Portage Lake-Houghton Hockey Club	US Pro	4	2	1	1	240	11	2.75	—	1
1903–04	Michigan Sault Ste. Marie Indians	US Pro	4	0	4	0	240	31	7.75	—	0
1904–05	Michigan Sault Ste. Marie Indians	IPHL	24	10	13	1	1428	79	3.32	—	1
1905–06	Michigan Sault Ste. Marie Indians	IPHL	22	16	6	0	1340	57	2.55	—	2
1906–07	Michigan Sault Ste. Marie Indians	IPHL	23	10	13	0	1358	88	3.80	—	0
1908–09	Cobalt Silver Kings	TPHL	8	6	2	0	484	32	3.97	—	0
1909–10	Cobalt Silver Kings	NHA	12	4	8	0	724	104	8.62	—	0
1910–11	Waterloo Colts	OPHL	16	9	7	0	1035	83	4.82	—	0
NHA totals			12	4	8	0	724	104	8.62	—	0

=== Playoffs ===
Season	Team	League	GP	W	L	T/OTL	MIN	GA	GAA	SV%	SO
1909–10	Cobalt Silver Kings	NHA	2	1	0	1	120	6	3.00	—	0
NHA totals			2	1	0	1	120	6	3.00	—	0

Source: Society for International Hockey Research Database
