= Rod Kennedy =

Canadian ice hockey player

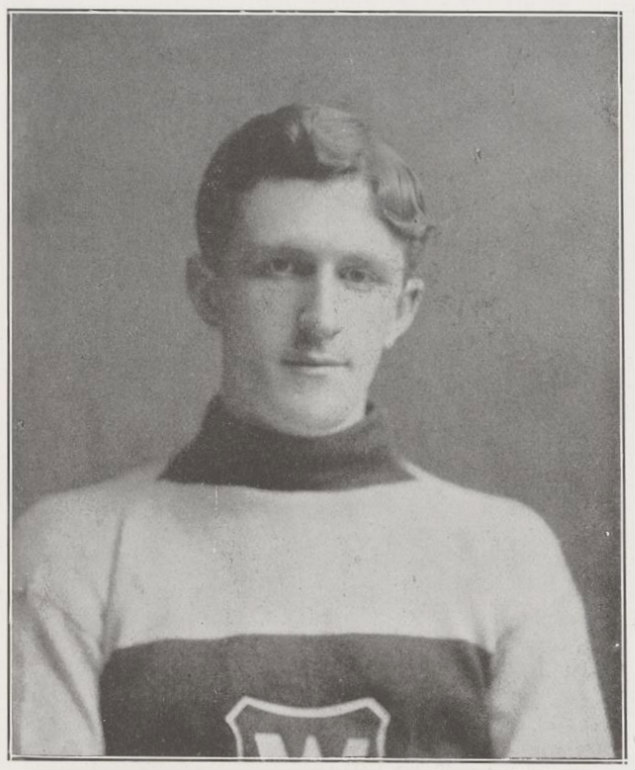
- Kennedy with the Montreal Wanderers.
- Born: March 17, 1882 Drummondville, Quebec, Canada
- Died: September 28, 1935 (aged 53) Brantford, Ontario, Canada
- Position: Defence
- Played for: Montreal Wanderers; Montreal Victorias; Montreal Nationals
- Playing career: 1903–1910

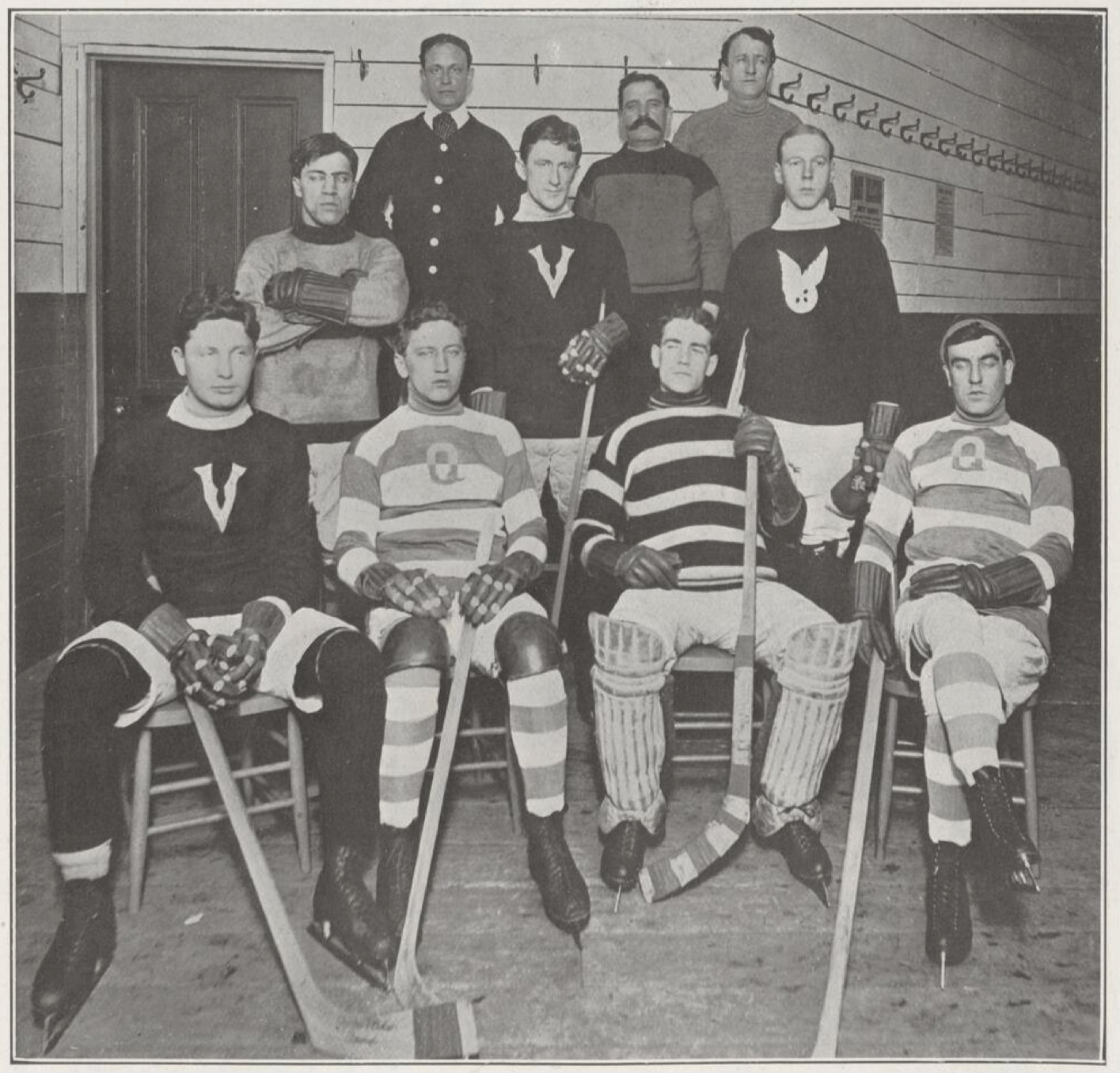
Kennedy, at center in the middle row, with the ECAHA All-Stars for the Hod Stuart Memorial Game in January 1908

John Roddick Kennedy (March 17, 1882 – September 28, 1935) was a Canadian amateur and professional ice hockey player. Kennedy, a defenceman, played most of his hockey in the amateur era, representing two storied clubs in the Montreal Wanderers and Montreal Victorias.

== Career ==
Kennedy was twice a member of Stanley Cup winning teams, both times with the Montreal Wanderers, in 1906 and 1907.

In January 1908 Kennedy was part of a benefit All-Star game, hosted by the Eastern Canada Amateur Hockey Association, for the family of his deceased former teammate on the Montreal Wanderers Hod Stuart, who had died in June 1907 in a diving accident. Montreal Wanderers won the game against the ECAHA All-Stars 10 goals to 7.

During the 1909–10 season Kennedy played with the Montreal Nationals in the short-lived Canadian Hockey Association circuit.

== Death ==
Kennedy died in Brantford, Ontario on September 28, 1935, after an illness lasting over four months. He had moved to Brantford from Quebec to manage a plant with the Lake of the Woods Milling Company.

== Achievements ==
- Stanley Cup – 1906 & 1907 (with Montreal Wanderers)
