= 1909 FHL season =

Season of play of professional ice hockey league

The 1909 Federal Hockey League (FHL) season was the sixth and final season of the league. The league had four teams participate this season, Cornwall, returning and three new entries, Ottawa Senators, Renfrew Creamery Kings and Smith's Falls. Smith's Falls had previously played in the league. Renfrew was the class of the league, winning all of its games to claim the championship.

== Season ==
The season started on January 8 with a game between The Seniors and Cornwall. A game arranged for that night between Renfrew and the Senators was postponed, necessitating a new schedule, and the season started in full gear on January 15, with the Senators visiting The Seniors.

Cornwall had difficulty fielding a competitive team, signing junior-age players for several games. The Senators played an exhibition game against Edmonton after their Stanley Cup challenge of the Montreal Wanderers, losing 4–2. The Senators did not draw at the box office, as both the Ottawa HC and the Ottawa Cliffsides drew more fans to The Arena in Ottawa, finishing with only 200 fans attending their last game on February 15.

=== Final standing ===
Note GP = Games Played, W = Wins, L = Losses, T = Ties, GF = Goals For, GA = Goals Against

Team	GP	W	L	T	GF	GA
Renfrew Creamery Kings	6	6	0	0	93	26
Ottawa Senators	6	3	3	0	37	38
Smiths Falls Seniors	6	2	4	0	35	71
Cornwall HC	6	1	5	0	30	60

=== Results ===
Month	Day	Visitor	Score	Home	Score
Jan.	8	Seniors	4	Cornwall	5
Jan.	14	Cornwall	12	Renfrew	24
Jan.	15	Senators	12	Seniors	3
Jan.	21	Renfrew	9	Senators	2
Jan.	21	Cornwall	5	Seniors	12
Jan.	29	Seniors	3	Renfrew	23
Jan.	29	Senators	9	Cornwall	5
Feb.	5	Seniors	9	Senators	8
Feb.	5	Renfrew	7	Cornwall	3
Feb.	10	Renfrew	18	Seniors	4
Feb.	12	Cornwall	0	Senators	4
Feb.	15	Senators	2	Renfrew	12

Source
Ottawa Citizen, January 9–February 16, 1909

== Stanley Cup challenge ==
After the season, Renfrew played Cobalt of the Timiskaming Professional Hockey League as a tune-up for a possible Stanley Cup challenge versus Ottawa HC of the Eastern Canada Hockey Association, winning 10–3. Renfrew played two exhibitions with the Montreal Wanderers, in Renfrew, losing 8–11, and in Brockville, losing 5–6.

Renfrew's challenge was stymied by the Stanley Cup trustees because Renfrew had signed players that were signed to other professional clubs. The trustees made those players who had joined teams after January 2 ineligible for Challenge play. Renfrew had signed Bert Lindsay, Didier Pitre and Steve Vair from Edmonton after their exhibition game in Ottawa. The players themselves were 'ringers' for Edmonton, not having played in the previous season for Edmonton, only signing for the Cup challenge. Renfrew had also signed Quebec's Eddie Hogan on January 11 and Jack McDonald on February 13.

== See also ==
- Federal Amateur Hockey League
- 1909 ECHA season
- List of pre-NHL seasons
- List of ice hockey leagues

Preceded by 1907–08 FHL season	FAHL seasons 1909	Succeeded by last season
