= Bert Boulton =

Canadian ice hockey player

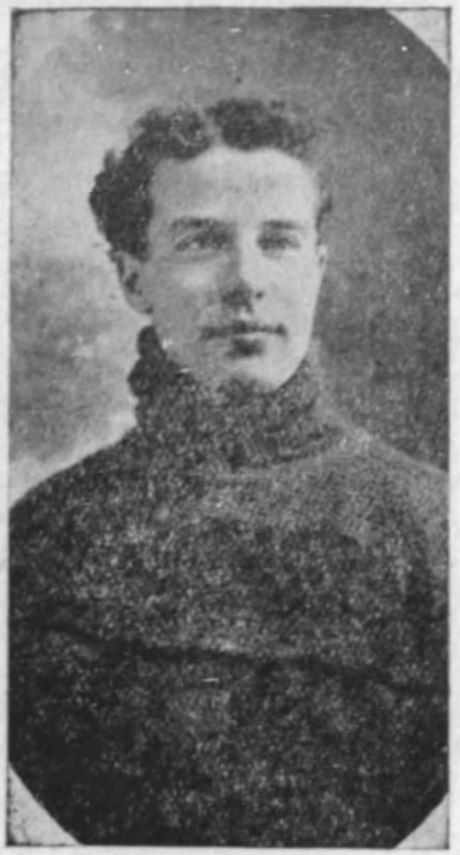
- Boulton with the Edmonton Pros
- Born: November 2, 1887 London, Ontario, Canada
- Died: December 12, 1949 (aged 62)
- Height: 5 ft 8 in (173 cm)
- Weight: 155 lb (70 kg; 11 st 1 lb)
- Position: Left wing
- Played for: Montreal Shamrocks
- Playing career: 1905–1909

Albert Stephen Boulton (November 2, 1887 – December 12, 1949) was a Canadian professional ice hockey player from London, Ontario. He played with the Montreal Shamrocks of the National Hockey Association, during the league's inaugural season in 1910.

Boulton was also a member of the Edmonton Pros team which (unsuccessfully) challenged the Ottawa Senators for the Stanley Cup in January 1910.
