= Didier Pitre =

Canadian ice hockey player (1883–1934)

- Hockey Hall of Fame, 1963
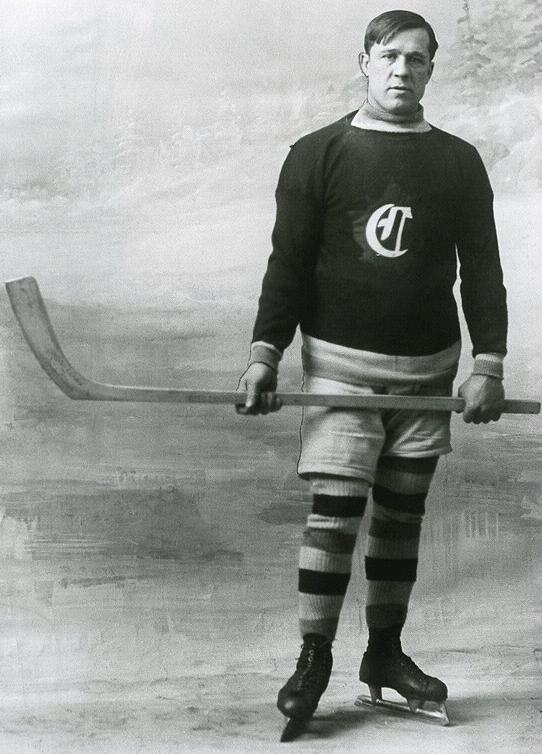
- Born: September 1, 1883 Valleyfield, Quebec, Canada
- Died: July 29, 1934 (aged 50) Sault Ste. Marie, Michigan, U.S.
- Height: 5 ft 11 in (180 cm)
- Weight: 185 lb (84 kg; 13 st 3 lb)
- Position: Right wing/Defence
- Shot: Right
- Played for: Montreal Le National; Michigan Soo Indians; Montreal Shamrocks; Edmonton Pros; Renfrew Millionaires; Vancouver Millionaires; Montreal Canadiens
- Playing career: 1908–1928

Joseph George Didier "Cannonball" Pitre (September 1, 1883 – July 29, 1934) was a Canadian professional ice hockey player. Nicknamed "Cannonball," he was renowned for having one of the hardest shots during his playing career. One of the first players to join the Montreal Canadiens, Pitre and his teammates' French-Canadian heritage led to the team being nicknamed The Flying Frenchmen. His teammates on the Canadiens included Jack Laviolette and Newsy Lalonde.

Though he spent the latter part of his career almost exclusively with the Canadiens, Pitre played for several other teams in various leagues early on, including the International Professional Hockey League, the first professional hockey league, and the Pacific Coast Hockey Association. A prolific scorer, Pitre won the Stanley Cup with the Canadiens in 1916, the first for the team. In 1963 he was inducted into the Hockey Hall of Fame.

He was the uncle of Vic Desjardins, a member of the United States Hockey Hall of Fame.

== Playing career ==
=== IPHL ===
Didier Pitre's first major hockey league experience was in the first fully professional league, the IPHL, playing with the Michigan Soo Indians alongside Jack Laviolette. Before that Pitre and Laviolette had played together on the Montreal Le National team in the Federal Amateur Hockey League. The Michigan Soo Indians were located in Sault Ste. Marie, Michigan. Pitre joined the Soo team for the 1904–05 season. By 1905–06, he was already the top scorer in the league scoring 41 goals in 22 games played. Pitre was on the IPHL First All-Star Team that year in 1905–06 and again in 1906–07.

Despite Pitre and Laviolette playing three years for the Michigan Soo in the IPHL, the club failed to bring home a championship, finishing 3rd, 2nd and 4th in the league standing between 1905–1907.

=== Montreal Shamrocks, Edmonton and Renfrew ===
The next season, in 1907–08, after the IPHL had folded, Pitre left as a free agent and played with the Montreal Shamrocks in the Eastern Canada Amateur Hockey Association (ECAHA), where he was again joined by Jack Laviolette. Pitre lasted only one year with the Shamrocks before leaving to play with the Edmonton Pros in Alberta. With Edmonton Pitre played three games before he was part of a Stanley Cup challenge in December 1908 when his team challenged the Montreal Wanderers for the coveted prize, eventually losing out 10 goals to 13 (3-7, 7-6) over two games.

After the Stanley Cup challenge with Edmonton Pitre jumped the contract and went back to eastern Canada where he played with the Renfrew Creamery Kings in the FAHL for the remainder of the 1908–09 season.

=== Montreal Canadiens ===
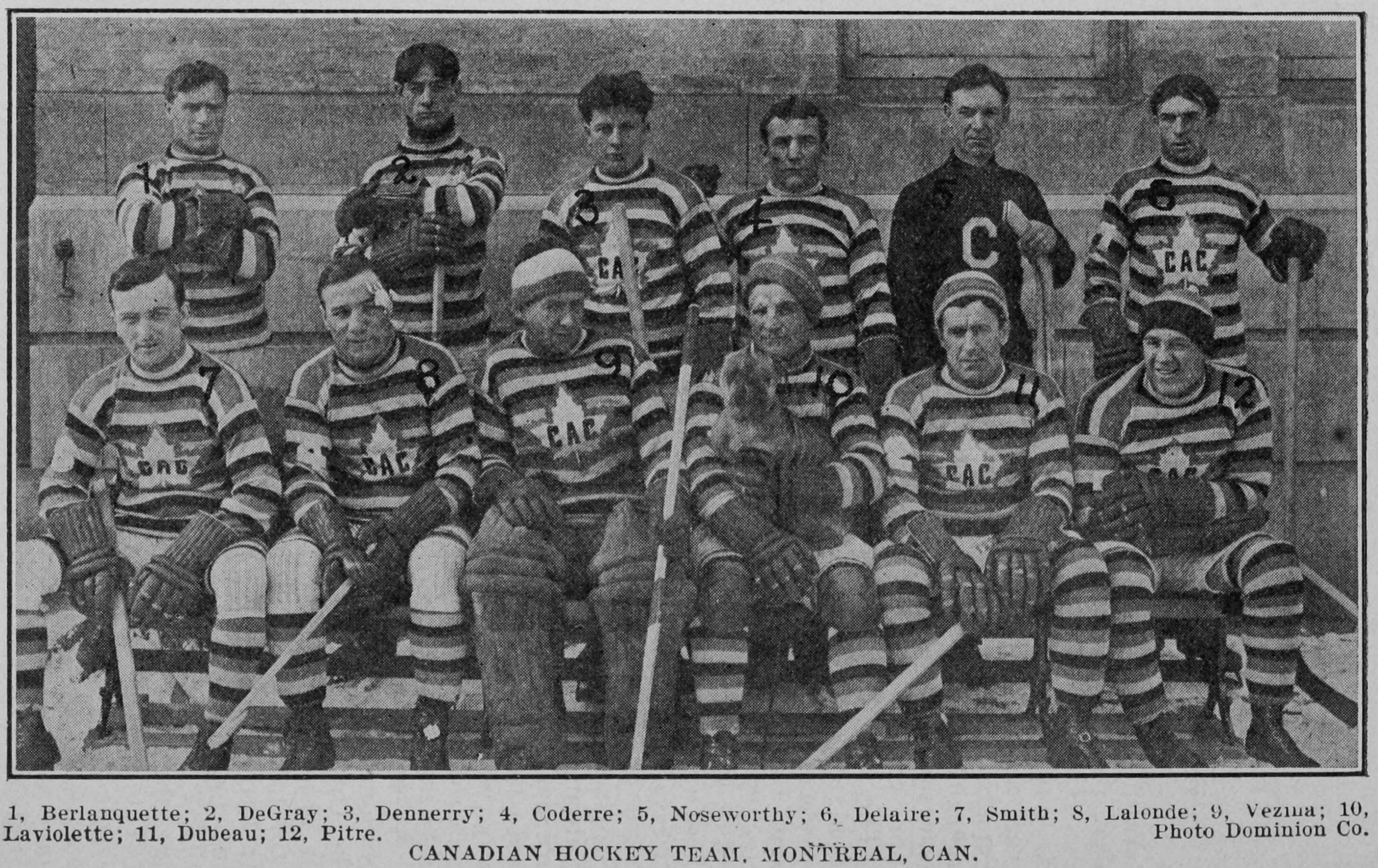
Pitre, sitting far right, with the 1912–13 Montreal Canadiens.

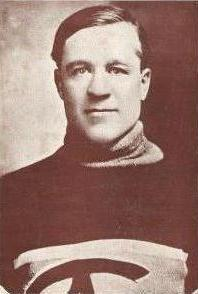
Pitre with the Montreal Canadiens.

Pitre joined the Montreal Canadiens in 1910 in the newly founded National Hockey Association (NHA), the club's first season of existence, where he teamed up with Jack Laviolette and Edouard "Newsy" Lalonde. He initially stayed for four years with the Canadiens, before leaving for the West again. Pitre spent a year playing with the Vancouver Millionaires in the Pacific Coast Hockey Association (PCHA) in 1913–14, after having been lured over by Vancouver Millionaires owner Frank Patrick, in a coast-to-coast trade that saw Newsy Lalonde go the other way to the Canadiens.

Pitre returned to the Montreal Canadiens the next year, in 1914–15. In 1916, Pitre led the NHA in regular-season assists and points. He scored 24 goals, 15 assists (assists in those days were one per goal and only if the official scorer thought it contributed to the goal being scored) for 39 points. He also helped lead the Canadiens to their first Stanley Cup, defeating Portland Rosebuds of the PCHA over five games. He led the playoffs in goals as well.

In the 1919 Stanley Cup playoffs, which were never completed due to the influenza epidemic, he led the playoffs in points. By 1921, the Montreal Canadiens had so much depth at forward, and an opening on defence due to the death of future Hall of Famer Joe Hall in the influenza epidemic, they decided to try Pitre as a defenceman. It was not as difficult a transition as one might think because he had previously been a rover during the days of "seven man" hockey. He remained with the Montreal Canadiens through the formation of the NHL and into 1923.

A forward throughout his career, Pitre played the final two seasons as a defenceman.

== Playing style ==
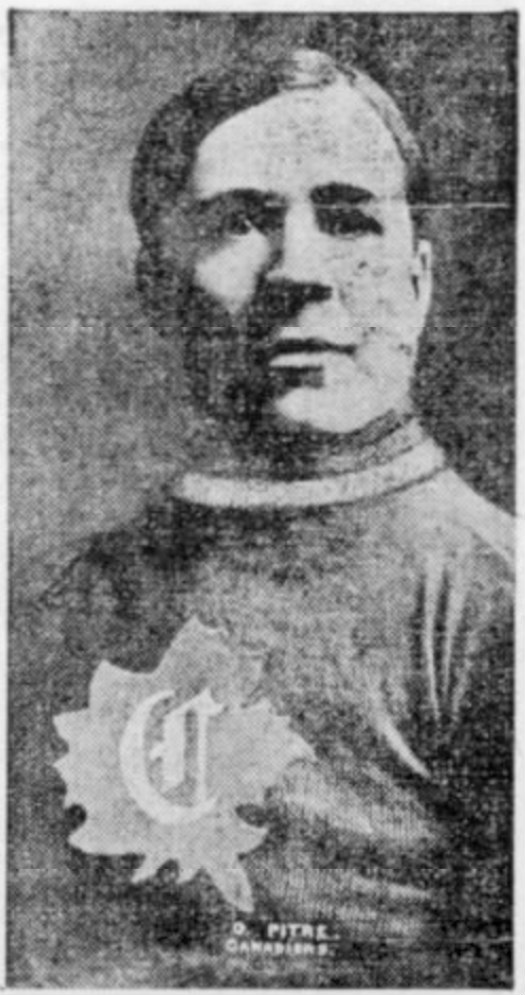
Pitre with the Montreal Canadiens.

Didier Pitre's combination of speed, size and a hard shot made him one of the preeminent offensive players of his era. A forward and a right-handed shot, Pitre played predominantly on the right wing position, but he also figured occasionally on the old rover position before it was removed by the NHA in 1911–12. At times he was also used as a cover-point, and at the back end of his career with the Montreal Canadiens, he would play as a defenceman.

"I used the shot when I first entered professional hockey, but I did not get the wrist movement with which I put the force into the bullet shot, until about 1910. That was when I first got the nickname "Bullet." I had been playing with the Canadiens and my continual fire on "Riley" Hern, the Montreal Wanderers goalkeeper, got on his nerves so much that the boys got to calling my shots "bullets." Hern dropped out of the game shortly afterwards and has not been back in hockey since."

— Pitre commenting on the origin of the "bullet shot" nickname.

Pitre's hard shot, which he would often fire from long range, was often dubbed a "bullet shot" in contemporary newspaper reports. In an interview with Mike Jay of the Vancouver Daily World in December 1913, while he was playing for the Vancouver Millionaires in the PCHA, Pitre explained that he generally used the center area of the stick blade while firing his shots, because it required considerable speed and strength to get the puck away. Pitre claimed that about 90 percent of the players instead used to shoot with the heel of the stick blade, because it was easier and felt more natural, but that his own favorite place to shoot from was the center area of the blade because it made it easier for him to "place" the puck. Regarding the "bullet shot" nickname, Pitre claimed that his teammates had come up with it after too many of his shots had rattled Montreal Wanderers net guardian Riley Hern.

"I skate along and get as much speed as possible because the faster I go the surer I am of getting my shot "placed." I shoot in hockey as I do in lacrosse, except that the movement in hockey is lower. Generally, I let the stick go back a little and send the puck with a half body turn and the wrist movement. I stop as soon as I shoot and in the stop I use all the force of the momentum of my body in sending the puck ahead. I shoot high only on rare occasions. I always shoot from the right and have never used my left in shooting. Before going in, I try to draw the defense to the side and get my opening. That's all, I guess."

— Pitre on his shot technique.

Although not considered one of the roughest players of his era, Pitre still had a bulky frame and could still handle himself physically if he had to, which in some seasons resulted in a fairly high amount of penalty minutes. Outside of ice hockey Pitre also played lacrosse, with the Montreal Nationals, and during the 1913 season, he ended up in a Toronto police court after he had lost his temper during a game in Toronto on July 26, between the Nationals and the Torontos, and punched referee Thomas Humphreys in the face. Pitre claimed that he used a similar shot technique in hockey as he did in lacrosse, except for a lower type of movement in his hockey shot and the speed amounted from his skating.

According to player and executive Lester Patrick Pitre shot a "heavy puck," similar to the baseball parlance of a "heavy ball," and he also claimed that Pitre once had knocked a goaltender unconscious for three hours with a puck after it had struck him on the forehead. Patrick also praised Pitre as a "clear-headed thinker" on the ice, which he claimed is what made him into a superstar player.

== Legacy ==
At the end of his hockey career, Pitre sold his business in Montreal and moved to Sault Ste. Marie in Michigan, where he had once started his professional hockey career. His nephew Vic Desjardins from Sault Ste. Marie, Michigan, would also play in the NHL, with the Chicago Black Hawks and New York Rangers, and would be inducted into the United States Hockey Hall of Fame.

Pitre died on July 29, 1934, in Sault Ste. Marie, Michigan, as a result of acute indigestion.

In 1963 he was inducted into the Hockey Hall of Fame.

== Career statistics ==
=== Regular season and playoffs ===
			Regular season					Playoffs
Season	Team	League	GP	G	A	Pts	PIM	GP	G	A	Pts	PIM
1904	Montreal Le National	FAHL	2	1	0	1	0	—	—	—	—	—
1905	Montreal Le National	CAHL	2	0	0	0	0	—	—	—	—	—
1904–05	Michigan Soo Indians	IPHL	13	11	0	11	6	—	—	—	—	—
1905–06	Michigan Soo Indians	IPHL	22	41	0	41	29	—	—	—	—	—
1906–07	Michigan Soo Indians	IPHL	23	25	11	36	28	—	—	—	—	—
1907–08	Montreal Shamrocks	ECAHA	10	3	0	3	15	—	—	—	—	—
1908–09	Edmonton Pros	ESrHL	3	0	0	0	0	—	—	—	—	—
1908–09	Edmonton Pros	Stanley Cup	—	—	—	—	—	2	0	2	2	11
1909	Renfrew Creamery Kings	FAHL	5	5	0	5	16	—	—	—	—	—
1910	Montreal Canadiens	NHA	12	11	0	11	5	—	—	—	—	—
1910–11	Montreal Canadiens	NHA	16	19	0	19	22	—	—	—	—	—
1911–12	Montreal Canadiens	NHA	18	27	0	27	40	—	—	—	—	—
1912–13	Montreal Canadiens	NHA	17	24	0	24	80	—	—	—	—	—
1913–14	Vancouver Millionaires	PCHA	15	14	2	16	12	—	—	—	—	—
1914–15	Montreal Canadiens	NHA	20	30	4	34	15	—	—	—	—	—
1915–16	Montreal Canadiens	NHA	24	24	15	39	42	5	4	1	5	15
1915–16	Montreal Canadiens	Stanley Cup	—	—	—	—	—	5	4	1	5	18
1916–17	Montreal Canadiens	NHA	21	21	6	27	50	2	2	2	4	32
1916–17	Montreal Canadiens	Stanley Cup	—	—	—	—	—	4	5	0	5	6
1917–18	Montreal Canadiens	NHL	20	17	8	25	29	2	0	1	1	13
1918–19	Montreal Canadiens	NHL	17	14	4	18	12	5	2	3	5	4
1918–19	Montreal Canadiens	Stanley Cup	—	—	—	—	—	5	0	3	3	0
1919–20	Montreal Canadiens	NHL	22	14	12	26	6	—	—	—	—	—
1920–21	Montreal Canadiens	NHL	23	16	5	21	25	—	—	—	—	—
1921–22	Montreal Canadiens	NHL	23	2	4	6	12	—	—	—	—	—
1922–23	Montreal Canadiens	NHL	22	1	2	3	0	2	0	0	0	0
IPHL totals			58	77	11	88	63	—	—	—	—	—
NHA totals			128	156	25	181	254	7	6	3	9	47
PCHA totals			15	14	2	16	12	—	—	—	—	—
NHL totals			127	64	35	99	84	14	2	7	9	16
Stanley Cup totals			–	—	—	—	—	16	9	6	15	35

- All statistics are taken from NHL.com.
