= Ottawa Senators (FHL) =

- City: Ottawa
- League: FHL
- Founded: 1908
- Operated: 1909
- Home arena: The Arena, Ottawa
- Colours: Green & White
- Head coach: Alf Smith

The Ottawa Senators were a professional ice hockey team based in Ottawa, Ontario, Canada. The team only existed for the final 1909 season of the Federal Hockey League (FHL). The team was composed mainly of ex-Ottawa "Silver Seven/Senators" Hockey Club players—a team that played in the competing Eastern Canada Hockey Association (ECHA) that same season. The club was formed to help boost the rivalry between the FHL and the ECHA so as to foster a Stanley Cup challenge. However, both the FHL and the ECHA folded after the season, leading to the eventual formation of the National Hockey Association (NHA).

== History ==
The club was organized on December 23, 1908. Led by Alf Smith, the club featured Bouse Hutton in goal, Rat Westwick at rover, and Arthur Moore on defense, all former Silver Seven players. Alf Smith's younger brother Billy Smith was also on the team.

The team played against three other Ontario-based teams: Cornwall, Renfrew Creamery Kings, Smiths Falls. The team compiled a 3–3 record to place second to Renfrew. While the team drew crowds in the thousands for their first matches against Edmonton Hockey Club and Renfrew, attendance declined to the point where only a few hundred attended the final game against Cornwall.

== Roster ==
- Bouse Hutton – goal
- Arthur Moore – defence (played goal for one game)
- Bob O'Leary – defence
- Rat Westwick – rover
- Billy Smith – forward
- Joe Dennison – centre (would later play for the NHA Senators)
- Bob Harrison – centre
- Alf Smith – right wing
- Alfred Young – left wing
- Ed Roberts – left wing

Source
The Globe, Ottawa Citizen, December 1908-February 1909.

== See also ==
- Ice hockey in Ottawa
