= Fred Whitcroft =

Canadian ice hockey player and coach (1882–1931)

- Hockey Hall of Fame, 1963
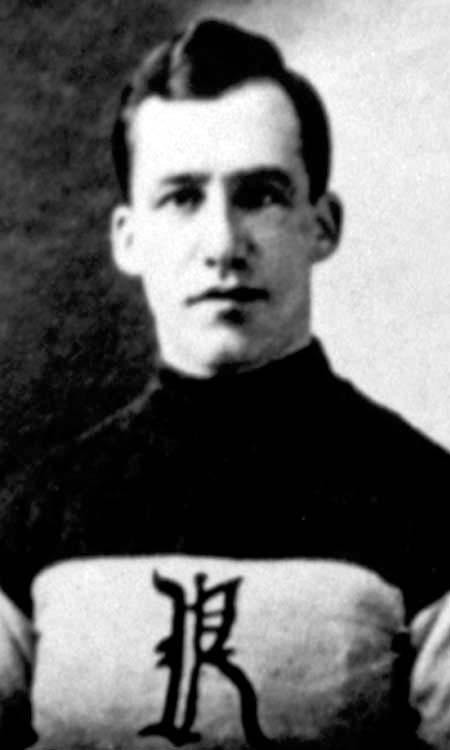
- Born: 2 December 1882 Milford, Ireland
- Died: 9 August 1931 (aged 48) Atlin, British Columbia, Canada
- Height: 5 ft 10 in (178 cm)
- Weight: 165 lb (75 kg; 11 st 11 lb)
- Position: Rover
- Shot: Right
- Played for: Renfrew Creamery Kings; Edmonton Eskimos; Kenora Thistles
- Playing career: 1906–1910

Frederick John Whitcroft (2 December 1882 – 9 August 1931) was a Canadian ice hockey player and coach. Whitcroft played for several notable amateur and early professional hockey squads, including the Renfrew Creamery Kings, Edmonton Eskimos and Kenora Thistles, between 1906 and 1910. He was inducted into the Hockey Hall of Fame in 1962.

== Hockey career ==
Early in his career, Whitcroft made a name for himself in hockey circles with his outstanding amateur play with the Peterborough Colts (Ontario Hockey Association Junior and Intermediate 1899-1904 and 1905-1907). In 1907 the Stanley Cup champion Kenora Thistles signed him to a $700 contract. While with the Thistles, the team defeated Brandon to retain the Stanley Cup. The club next played a challenge with the Montreal Wanderers. The Wanderers defeated the Thistles in a two game, total points series by the score of 12–8, avenging their loss to the Thistles earlier in the season.

The following year Whitcroft signed a contract to play with the Edmonton Eskimos of the Alberta Professional Hockey League. While with Edmonton, Whitcroft scored six goals in a game, five goals in a game three times and four times in a game once. Whitcroft led the league two years running in goals scored. Edmonton played in one Stanley Cup challenge in 1908, coming up against the Wanderers, losing 13-10 on goals in a two-game series. After the Edmonton team disbanded in December 1909, Whitcroft jumped back east and signed with the National Hockey Association's Renfrew Creamery Kings for $2,000. Among his teammates were Hockey Hall of Famers Cyclone Taylor, Frank Patrick, Lester Patrick, and Newsy Lalonde, on a team dubbed the Renfrew Millionaires. After one season playing for the Millionaires, Whitcroft retired from playing. He coached the Edmonton Dominions to the Alberta championship in 1913–14.

He took up gold prospecting after his hockey career was over, while also coaching the Edmonton team for the Patricks, his former teammates. Whitcroft died of a heart attack in northern British Columbia August 9, 1931.
