= Michigan Soo Indians =

Early professional ice hockey team

- City: Sault Ste. Marie, Michigan
- League: International Professional Hockey League
- Founded: 1903–04
- Operated: 1904–1907
- Home arena: Ridge Street Ice-A-Torium
- Colors: Purple, White

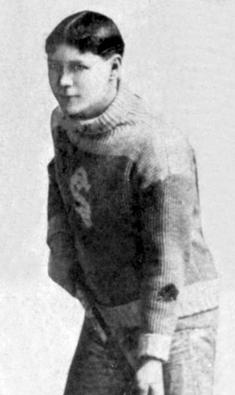
Michigan Soo Indians player Frank Switzer.

The Michigan Soo Indians, also known as the American Soo Indians, was a professional ice hockey team from Sault Ste. Marie, Michigan, United States. The team played for three seasons in the International Professional Hockey League, the first fully professional hockey league in North America, from 1904 to 1907. The league was formed in November 1904 and consisted of five teams; three from Michigan, one from Pennsylvania and one from Ontario in Canada.

Michigan Soo Indians had its best season in the IPHL in its second year, the 1905–06 season, when the team finished at second place in the standings with 36 points, two points behind the champion team Portage Lakes Hockey Club.

== Notable players ==
Notable players who played for the Michigan Soo Indians were Hockey Hall of Fame members Didier Pitre and Jack Laviolette, of Montreal Canadiens fame.
