= Montreal Montagnards =

Ice hockey team

Le Montagnard de Montréal
- Founded: 1898
- History: 1898 (JrDHL); 1899-1900 (Independent); 1901–1902 (I-CAHL); 1903 (dormant); 1904*–1907 (FAHL); *For this season the team merged into the Montreal Nationals.
- City: Montreal, Quebec
- Stanley Cups: 0

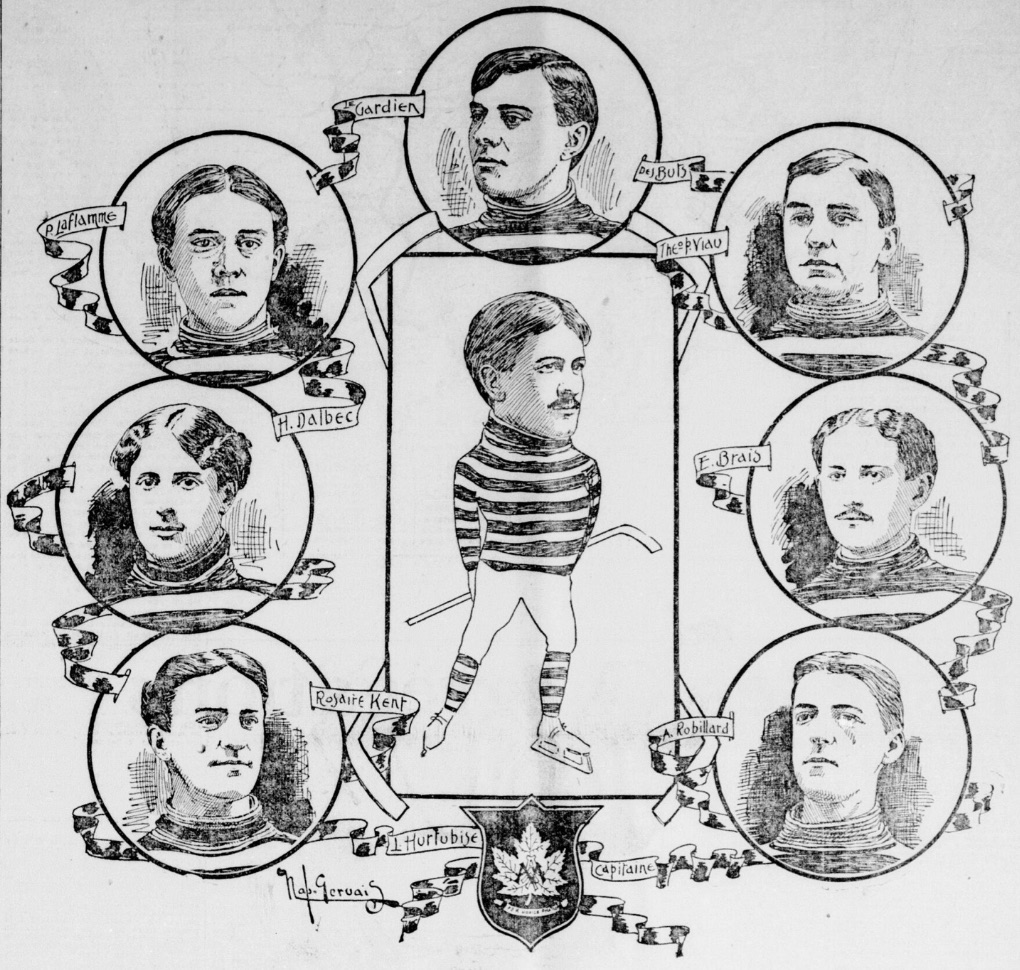
Montreal Montagnards in 1901

The Montreal Montagnards (French: Le Montagnard de Montréal) were an early amateur ice hockey team in Canada, organized in the late 19th century. The club is notable as one of the first teams made up of francophone players, the sport having been dominated until that time by players of English or Scottish descent.

== History ==
The Montagnards originated as a snowshoe club in 1896. The club decided to launch a hockey club in 1898 playing in the Junior District Hockey League (JrDHL) before playing various challenges as an independent club for the next two seasons. They also iced a second team that played in the City Hockey League from 1898-1899. The Montagnards also built their own arena. Originally the arena was known as the Montagnard Rink but later renamed the Montagnard Stadium. In 1901, the team entered the Intermediate Canadian Amateur Hockey League (I-CAHL) along with the Montreal Nationals. In 1902, they won their section but lost in the playoffs to the intermediate MAAA team. The club went dormant in 1903.

In 1904, the Nationals were accepted in the Federal Amateur Hockey League (FAHL) and asked the Montagnards to join them. The Montagnards merged into the Nationals for that season. While the team used the Nationals name and uniforms they would play their home games in the Montagnards arena. The team finished second to the Montreal Wanderers. The Montagnards separated from the Nationals in 1905, with the Nationals joining the CAHL and the Montagnards staying in the Federal League. In 1906–07, the Montagnards were leading the FAHL but after the Cornwall team used two professionals from the Montreal Shamrocks, the club protested the game. The protest was lost and the Montagnards resigned from the league folding as a hockey team. The organization continued running their arena with The University of Montreal and McGill University being the major renters of the Stadium from 1908 to 1910 when the building was destroyed in a fire.

== Notable players ==
- Ed Millaire – later played for the Montreal Canadiens

== See also ==
- Montreal Le National
