= Owen McCourt =

Canadian ice hockey player

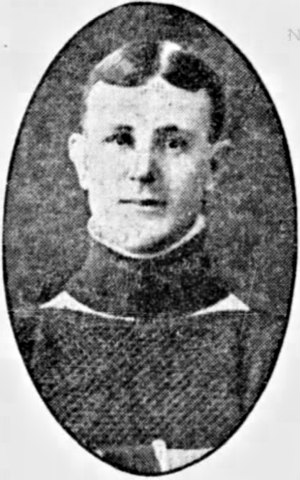
- Photo from March 14, 1907 issue of the Ottawa Citizen
- Born: September 21, 1884 Cornwall, Ontario, Canada
- Died: March 7, 1907 (aged 22) Cornwall, Ontario, Canada
- Position: Forward; Rover
- Played for: Cornwall Hockey Club; Montreal Shamrocks
- Playing career: 1903–1907

Owen "Bud" McCourt (September 21, 1884 – March 7, 1907) was a Canadian ice hockey player with Cornwall and the Montreal Shamrocks. He is most notable for his death as a result of an on-ice brawl in which he was struck in the head by several sticks.

== Playing career ==
McCourt played his entire, brief career with Cornwall Hockey Club of the Federal Amateur Hockey League (FAHL) – save for a two-game stint with the Montreal Shamrocks of the Eastern Canada Amateur Hockey Association in 1907 – and blossomed into stardom in his final two seasons. He led Cornwall with five goals in the 1906 season, and went on in 1907 to score 16 goals in eight games to lead the league, including seven against Morrisburg on February 22.

=== Career stats ===
He scored a total of 26 goals in 23 senior matches.

== Death from on-ice injuries ==
On March 6, 1907, McCourt was playing for the Cornwall Hockey Club against the Ottawa Victorias in a replay of a match on February 15 protested by Ottawa because McCourt and one other player had played for the Montreal Shamrocks of a rival league. McCourt's eligibility, protested by Ottawa, had been established before the game. Early in the second half of the match, a brawl broke out between the teams during which McCourt suffered a head injury. He was taken from the ice unconscious, and died the following morning.

=== Aftermath ===
An inquest was held that same day at which the following verdict was rendered:

That Owen McCourt came to his death by a blow from a hockey stick in the hands of Charles Masson during the progress of a game of hockey played in the Victoria rink in the town of Cornwall March 6, 1907, and, that in the opinion of this jury, although there is no evidence of ill feeling previous to the assault, there was no justification by personal provocation for the blow at the hands of the said Charles Masson. After hearing the evidence, your jury further recommends that legislation be enacted whereby players or spectators encouraging or engaging in rough or foul play may be severely punished.

In the second known trial (after the 1905 trial of Allan Loney) stemming from an in-game ice hockey incident, Masson was arraigned on a charge of manslaughter (reduced from a murder charge over the objection of the Crown prosecutor) on April 10, 1907. Several witnesses attested that McCourt had been struck by another, unknown player before Masson's blow, and Masson was subsequently acquitted.

In the aftermath of the incident, Cornwall withdrew from the league, and the Victorias (one of the two remaining teams in the loop after the withdrawals of the second-place Cornwall team and the first-place Montagnards) were named champions. As champions of the league, Ottawa challenged for the Stanley Cup, which was accepted by the trustees, and played a year later against the Montreal Wanderers in January 1908.

The referee of the match in which McCourt died, Emmett Quinn, later became president of the National Hockey Association (NHA).

McCourt was the second player in North American hockey to die as a result of on-ice violence; Alcide Laurin was killed in an incident in 1905.

== See also ==
- List of ice hockey players who died during their playing career
- Violence in ice hockey
