= Ottawa Victorias =

- City: Ottawa, Ontario
- League: OCHL 1902–03; CAHL Jr. 1903–1905; FAHL 1905–1908
- Founded: 1901
- Operated: 1901–1908
- Home arena: Victoria Ice Rink, Ottawa
- Colours: Purple, White
- General manager: Jimmie Enright

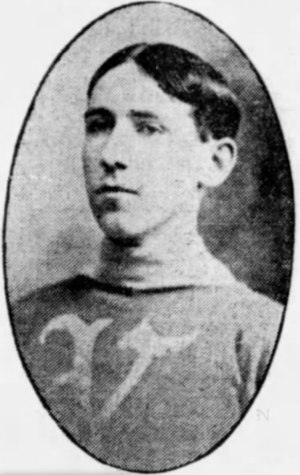
Bob Harrison, captain of the 1907–08 Ottawa Victorias Stanley Cup challenging team.

The Ottawa Victorias were an early Canadian ice hockey team. The club challenged for the Stanley Cup in 1908, losing to the Montreal Wanderers.

== History ==
The club was founded in 1901 by Jimmie Enright, owner and manager of the Victoria ice rink in Ottawa. For two seasons, the team only played exhibition matches, without a defeat. For the 1903 season, the team joined the Ottawa City Hockey League, playing against the Beavers, Emmetts, Nationals and Rialto teams. The Victorias won the OCHL championship against the Emmetts at the Rialto Rink. In the 1904 season, the Victorias joined the Canadian Amateur Hockey League (CAHL), junior division. The Victorias defeated Buckingham, Quebec to win the title. For the following season, the Victorias joined the Federal Amateur Hockey League (FAHL), coming second against Smiths Falls for the 1905–06 title.

In the 1906–07 season, the Victorias were involved in the on-ice donnybrook with the Cornwall club that resulted in Bud McCourt's death. Cornwall dropped out of the league and the Victorias were awarded the league title.

After being awarded the 1907 title, the Victorias issued a challenge for the Stanley Cup. The Victorias had to play a qualifying game against Renfrew of the Upper Ottawa League. After defeating Renfrew, the Victorias played the challenge against the Montreal Wanderers, losing the two-game, total-goals series 22 to 4 in January 1908.

Date	Winning Team	Score	Losing Team	Location
January 9, 1908	Montreal Wanderers	9–3	Ottawa Victorias	Montreal Arena
January 13, 1908	Montreal Wanderers	13–1	Ottawa Victorias	Montreal Arena
Montreal wins total goals series 22 goals to 4

In the team's final season of 1907–08, the league dissolved after a month's worth of play. Three teams were active, Brockville, Cornwall and Ottawa. The Brockville team was the Renfrew Creamery Kings of the Upper Ottawa league. The Victorias refused to play against Brockville's rented team and the league dissolved.

== Notable players ==
- Eddie Gerard – 1945 Hockey Hall of Fame inductee
- Tommy Smith – 1973 Hockey Hall of Fame inductee
