= Federal Amateur Hockey League =

Canadian amateur ice hockey association

- Sport: Ice hockey
- Founded: December 5, 1903 (122 years ago)
- First season: 1904
- Folded: February 15, 1909 (117 years ago)
- Country: Canada
- Last champion: Renfrew Creamery Kings (1909)
- Most titles: Ottawa Hockey Club (2)

The Federal Amateur Hockey League (FAHL) was a Canadian men's senior-level ice hockey league that played six seasons, from 1904 to 1909. The league was formed initially to provide a league for teams not accepted by the rival Canadian Amateur Hockey League (CAHL).

The FAHL's membership changed in each of its six seasons of operation. During the FAHL's inaugural 1904 season, the Montreal Le National became the first francophone ice hockey team to play in a league with anglophone clubs. The 1906-07 season ended early due to an on-ice death, and the 1907 schedule was suspended mid-season.

The FAHL was a professional league for its last two years and was known as the Federal Hockey League (FHL). The league dissolved with the formation of the National Hockey Association (NHA).

The FAHL, through league member Ottawa Hockey Club, held the Stanley Cup for the 1904-05 season.

== History ==
=== 1903–1906 ===
The FAHL was formed December 5, 1903, at a meeting held at the Savoy hotel in Montreal.

The first executive officers were:

- President: William Foran, Ottawa Capitals
- Vice-president: W. Fitzgibbon, Cornwall
- Second vice-president: A. Meunier, Nationals
- Secretary-treasurer: James Strachan, Wanderers.

The first franchises were granted to the Wanderers, the Capitals, Cornwall and Le National. Three of the four teams had been rejected for membership by the Canadian Amateur Hockey League (CAHL), while the fourth – the Montreal Wanderers – was composed of disillusioned players from two Montreal-based CAHL teams. Montreal Le National, a francophone athletic organization, which also operated a lacrosse club, had operated an intermediate team in the CAHL. Only the Cornwall team would be a member for the FAHL's entire six seasons of play.

The league adopted the constitution of the CAHL, except that new teams could join on a majority vote, unlike the unanimity required by the CAHL; and that any players who played in another league would be permanently suspended from play in the FAHL. Games in Montreal would be played on week-nights – at the Montagnard and Victoria rinks – to not conflict with the Saturday games of the CAHL.

The inaugural 1904 season ended on February 24. Montreal Le National jumped to the CAHL, while the CAHL's Stanley Cup champion Ottawa Hockey Club (HC) jumped to the FAHL, immediately (March 2) defending the Stanley Cup and taking the one-week-old FAHL league championship away from the regular season champion Wanderers.

The Ottawa HC would repeat as FAHL champion, and retain the Stanley Cup, in the 1904-05 season, before moving (with the Cup) to the Eastern Canada Amateur Hockey Association (ECAHA, later ECHA) for the 1905-06 season.

=== 1906–07 ===
The 1906-07 season ended early following the death of Owen McCourt of Cornwall, after an on-ice brawl in a game on March 6, 1907 between Cornwall and the Ottawa Victorias. This led to criminal charges of manslaughter against Charles Masson of the Victorias, who was acquitted when witnesses at the trial stated that other Ottawa hockey players had hit McCourt in the head prior to Masson's blow.

March 6, 1907
Victorias	3	at	Cornwall	11
	G	Pos		G
Billy Bannerman		G	Jack Hunter	
Jack Ryan		P	Cliff Hollingsworth	3
Charles Masson		CP	Edward Caine	
Chic Chamberlain		RO	Zina Runions	2
Alf Young	2	C	Donald Smith	5
Jack Williams	1	RW	Reddy McMillan	1
Art Throop		LW	Owen McCourt	
Referee: Emmett Quinn, Montreal; Judge of play: E. A. Pilon, Montreal

A few of the players involved in the March 6, 1907 game:

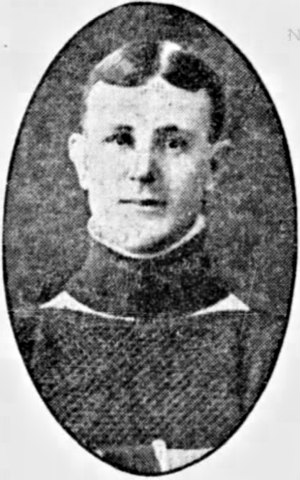
Owen McCourt

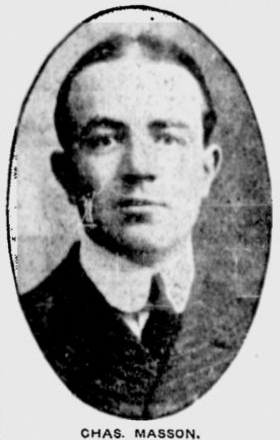
Charles Masson

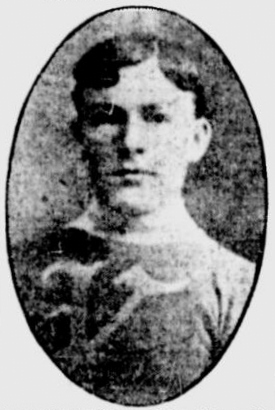
Art Throop

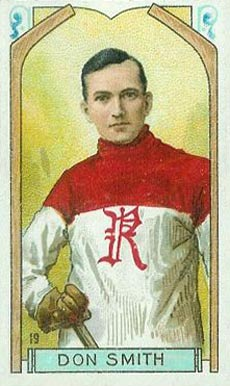
Don Smith, while with Renfrew

=== 1907–1909 ===
The 1908 season saw the Federal League return with only three teams, all professional. Brockville, unable to field a competitive team, hired the Renfrew Creamery Kings club to play as the Brockville entry. This was unacceptable to the Ottawa Victorias, which refused to play the Renfrew players, causing the league to suspend operations.

The final season, 1909, saw the Renfrew Creamery Kings become a full member of the league. Ottawa's new entry, officially called the Senators, was organized by players who resigned from the ECHA's (and former FAHL) Ottawa "Senators/Silver Seven" HC.

The league dissolved in 1909, with only Renfrew continuing professional play when the team joined the National Hockey Association.

== Teams ==
Season	Teams	Champion
1904	Cornwall, Montreal Le National, Montreal Wanderers, Ottawa Capitals	Montreal Wanderers (best record), Ottawa HC† (joins days after regular season, wins playoff/defends Stanley Cup)
1904–05	Brockville, Cornwall, Montreal Montagnards, Montreal Wanderers, Ottawa HC	Ottawa HC† (best record)
1905–06	Brockville, Cornwall, Montreal Montagnards, Ottawa Victorias, Smiths Falls	Smiths Falls (best record)
1906–07	Cornwall, Montreal Montagnards, Morrisburg, Ottawa Victorias	Ottawa Victorias (awarded championship after Montagnards and Cornwall resigned from league)
1908	Brockville Invincibles, Cornwall, Ottawa Victorias	No champion
1909	Cornwall, Ottawa Senators, Renfrew Creamery Kings, Smiths Falls	Renfrew

† Stanley Cup winner

- The three 'multi-year' (1904–05, 1905–06, 1906–07) seasons started with a late December game, the 'single-year' seasons started in January.
- After the 1904 season, Montreal Le National joined the CAHL.
- After the 1904-05 season, Montreal Wanderers and Ottawa HC joined the ECAHA.

== See also ==
- Canadian Amateur Hockey League
- Eastern Canada Amateur Hockey Association
- List of Stanley Cup champions
- List of pre-NHL seasons
- List of ice hockey leagues
