= 1908–09 Montreal Wanderers season =

Canadian ice hockey club season

The 1908–09 Montreal Wanderers season was the sixth season of play of the Montreal Wanderers. The Wanderers, as defending Stanley Cup champions, defended the Cup against Edmonton before the season started. The Wanderers finished second overall in the ECHA standings and the Ottawa Hockey Club would win the league championship to take over the Stanley Cup.

== Team business ==
The Eastern Canadian Amateur Hockey Association league meeting was held November 4, 1908, and was a pivotal meeting in the evolution from amateur to professional ice hockey leagues. At the meeting the two last amateur, or at least partly amateur teams resigned over the signing of players from other teams. Montreal HC and Montreal Victorias left the league and later would continue as senior level men's teams playing for the Allan Cup. Unpaid players would no longer play with paid players. The league would continue with four professional teams. The league name was changed to Eastern Canadian Hockey Association to reflect the change in status.

== Regular season ==
Cecil Blachford retired and Bruce Stuart had moved to Ottawa. New additions included Joe Hall, Harry Smith, Jimmy Gardner and Steve Vair. The Wanderers would come close to their rivals, finishing second with nine wins and three losses.

On January 25, Wanderers played an exhibition game in Cobalt, Ontario, versus the Cobalt Silver Kings, betting $500 on themselves to win, but lost 6-4. After the game Harry Smith would leave the Wanderers to join Haileybury of the Timiskaming League.

=== Highlights ===
The rivalry between Ottawa and Wanderers continued, Wanderers winning the first on January 6, 7–6 in overtime, with Harry Smith scoring four against his former team. Ottawa would win the next 5–4 in Ottawa, and defeat the Wanderers in Montreal 9–8 before 8000 fans. Ottawa would finish the series winning 8–3 in Ottawa to clinch the championship.

=== Final standing ===
Team	Games Played	Wins	Losses	Ties	Goals For	Goals Against
Ottawa HC	12	10	2	0	117	63
Montreal Wanderers	12	9	3	0	82	61
Quebec HC	12	3	9	0	78	106
Montreal Shamrocks	12	2	10	0	56	103

== Schedule and results ==
Month	Day	Visitor	Score	Home	Score	Record
Jan.	6	Ottawa	6	Wanderers	7 (7:40 OT)	1–0
Jan.	13	Wanderers	7	Quebec	3	2–0
Jan.	16	Quebec	6	Wanderers	7	3–0
Jan.	20	Shamrocks	5	Wanderers	7	4–0
Jan.	27	Shamrocks	1	Wanderers	5	5–0
Jan.	30	Wanderers	4	Ottawa	5	5–1
Feb.	6	Ottawa	9	Wanderers	8	5–2
Feb.	10	Shamrocks	6	Wanderers	8	6–2
Feb.	17	Wanderers	12	Shamrocks	2	7–2
Feb.	20	Wanderers	7	Quebec	4	8–2
Feb.	27	Quebec	6	Wanderers	7	9–2
Mar.	4	Wanderers	3	Ottawa	8	9–3

== Player statistics ==
=== Goaltending averages ===
Name	GP	GA	SO	Avg.
Riley Hern	12	61		5.1

=== Leading scorers ===
Name	GP	G
Frank "Pud" Glass	12	17
Steve Vair	7	12
Jimmy Gardner	12	11

== Stanley Cup challenges ==
=== Montreal vs. Edmonton ===
Prior to the season, Wanderers would play a challenge against the Edmonton Hockey Club, champions of the Alberta Amateur Hockey Association. Despite all players except for one being a 'ringer' for Edmonton, Montreal would defeat them 13–10, in Montreal. In game one, Harry Smith scored 5 goals as he led the Wanderers to a 7–3 victory. The Edmontons won game two, 7–6, but Montreal took the two-game total goals series, 13–10.

Date	Winning Team	Score	Losing Team	Location
December 28, 1908	Montreal Wanderers	7–3	Edmonton HC	Montreal Arena
December 30, 1908	Edmonton HC	7–6	Montreal Wanderers	Montreal Arena
Montreal wins total goals series 13 goals to 10

After the challenge, Edmonton would play an exhibition game in Ottawa on January 2 before returning to Edmonton, defeating the Ottawa Senators (of the FHL) 4–2. Ottawa played the Toronto Pros the same day in Toronto, losing 5–4. Lindsay, Pitre and Vair, having played with Edmonton for the challenge, would sign after the exhibition game with Renfrew of the Federal League. The players would help Renfrew to the FHL championship.

== Post-season exhibitions ==
The Wanderers played an exhibition against Montreal Le National at the Jubilee Rink on March 10, winning 10–9. The Le National lineup featured several future Montreal Canadiens players including Alphonse Jette, Newsy Lalonde, Jack Laviolette and Didier Pitre.

Ottawa and the Wanderers played a two-game series for a $1,000 purse at the St. Nicholas Rink in New York on March 12 and March 13. Ottawa won the first game 6–4, and the second game was tied 8–8.

== See also ==
- Eastern Canadian Amateur Hockey Association
- 1909 ECHA season
- List of Stanley Cup champions
