= 1903–04 Montreal Wanderers season =

Canadian ice hockey club season

The 1903–04 Montreal Wanderers season was the first season of play of the new Montreal Wanderers ice hockey club of Montreal, Quebec, Canada. The club won the inaugural championship of the also-new Federal Amateur Hockey League (FAHL) and challenged for the Stanley Cup.

== Team business ==
The club was organized from players from the Montreal Hockey Club and the Montreal Victorias. At the organizational meeting of December 3, 1903, the club selected its colours of red and white and selected the initial directors of the team:

- Honorary president: George Hodge
- Honorary vice-president: Clarence. D. McKerrow
- President: James Strachan
- Vice-president: George Guile
- Secretary: Tom Hodge

The club had formed over a dispute over the control of the Montreal Hockey Club. The Wanderers nickname was a namesake of the Montreal Wanderers team which played in the Montreal Winter Carnival hockey tournament in 1884. The club joined with teams rejected for membership in the Canadian Amateur Hockey League (CAHL) and helped found the Federal Amateur Hockey League (FAHL) on December 5, 1903. Many of the early Wanderers had been members of the Montreal Hockey Club team of 1902, which won the Stanley Cup. That team had been known as the "Little Men of Iron" because of the players' tenacity and small stature, and the nickname carried over to the new club.

== Regular season ==
The Wanderers, formed from players of the 1903 Stanley Cup champion Montreal Hockey Club, were the class of the league and went undefeated. Jack Marshall led the league in scoring, scoring 11 goals in six games.

Ken Mallen started the season with Cornwall but joined the Wanderers, playing two regular season games and the Cup challenge. He would leave after the season to become a professional in the International League.

=== Final standing ===
Team	Games Played	Wins	Losses	Ties	Goals For	Goals Against
Montreal Wanderers	6	6	0	0	38	18
Montreal Le National	6	3	3	0	27	27
Cornwall HC	6	2	4	0	20	27
Ottawa Capitals	6	1	5	0	28	41

=== Results ===
Month	Day	Visitor	Score	Home	Score	Record
Jan.	15	Wanderers	5	Cornwall	1	1–0
Jan.	20	Capitals	6	Wanderers	10	2–0
Jan.	27	Le National	2	Wanderers	4	3–0
Feb.	3	Wanderers	7	Le National	3	4–0
Feb.	18	Cornwall	3	Wanderers	8	5–0
Feb.	20	Wanderers	4	Capitals	3	6–0

== Player stats ==
Goaltender average

Name	GP	GA	SO	Avg.
Nicholson, Billy	6	18	0	3.0

Scoring

Name	GP	G
Jack Marshall	4	11
"Pokey" Leahy	5	7
Jimmy Gardner	6	5
Fred Strike	2	4
Cecil Blachford	5	4
Billy Bellingham	2	3
Price, C.A.	1	2
Ken Mallen	2	2
Dickie Boon	4	0
Billy Strachan	6	0
Bert Strachan	1	0

== Stanley Cup challenge ==
The Wanderers first Stanley Cup challenge was played against the Ottawa Hockey Club on March 2, 1904, resulting in a 5–5 tie game. The Wanderers would refuse to continue the series unless the tie was replayed in Montreal, and forfeited the series.
