= Clarence McKerrow =

Canadian athlete (1877–1959)

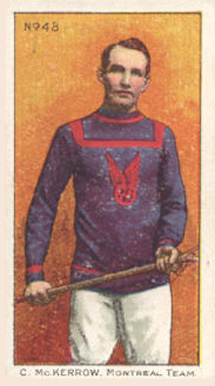
- McKerrow with the Montreal Lacrosse Club.
- Born: January 18, 1877 Montreal, Quebec, Canada
- Died: October 20, 1959 (aged 82) Montreal, Quebec, Canada
- Weight: 68 kg (150 lb; 10 st 10 lb)
- Position: Rover (ice hockey); Defense (lacrosse)
- Played for: Montreal Hockey Club; Montreal Lacrosse Club
- Playing career: 1895–1899

Olympic medal record

Men's lacrosse

Representing Canada
Gold medal – first place	1908 London	Team

Clarence Douglas "Clare" McKerrow (January 18, 1877 – October 20, 1959) was a Canadian athlete. McKerrow competed in lacrosse for Canada in the 1908 Summer Olympics. McKerrow also played ice hockey with the Montreal Hockey Club and won Stanley Cup in 1902 as a trainer.

He was born in Montreal, Quebec.

== Career ==
As an ice hockey player, an 18-year-old McKerrow, weighing only 115 pounds at the time and considered too young and too light for senior hockey, sat on the Montreal Hockey Club bench for the entirety of the 1894–95 regular season. But when Billy Barlow was absent for the March 9, 1895, Stanley Cup challenge game against the Queen's University team of the OHA, McKerrow was called upon to play, scoring a goal while his team defended the Stanley Cup, and from there on he was a fixture on the team roster.

In March 1902, McKerrow coached the Montreal Hockey Club, then dubbed the "Little Men of Iron" because of the small stature of many of its players (including Dickie Boon, Archie Hooper, Jimmy Gardner and Jack Marshall), to a Stanley Cup victory over the Winnipeg Victorias.

In 1908 he was part of the Canadian lacrosse team which won the gold medal in the Summer Olympics, alongside future ice hockey magnate Tommy Gorman.

McKerrow died in Montreal on October 20, 1959.

== Statistics ==
=== Ice hockey ===
			Regular season					Playoffs
Season	Team	League	GP	G	A	P	PIM	GP	G	A	P	PIM
1895	Montreal Hockey Club	Stanley Cup	–	–	–	–	–	1	1	—	1	—
1896	Montreal Hockey Club	AHAC	6	8	–	8	–	—	—	—	—	—
1897	Montreal Hockey Club	AHAC	8	12	–	12	–	–	–	–	–	–
1898	Montreal Hockey Club	AHAC	8	13	–	13	–	–	–	–	–	–
1899	Montreal Hockey Club	CAHL	4	12	–	12	–	–	–	–	–	–
AHAC totals			22	33	–	33	–	–	–	–	–	–
