= 1903 CAHL season =

Ice hockey season

- League: Canadian Amateur Hockey League
- Sport: Ice hockey
- Duration: January 3 – February 28, 1903
- Teams: 5

1903
- Champions: Ottawa Hockey Club
- Top scorer: Russell Bowie (22 goals)

CAHL seasons
- ← 1902 1904 →

The 1903 Canadian Amateur Hockey League (CAHL) season was the fifth season of the league. Teams played an eight-game schedule. Ottawa and Montreal Victorias tied for the league championship with records of six wins and two losses. Ottawa defeated the Victorias in a two-game playoff to win the season and their first Stanley Cup championship, the first of "Silver Seven" era.

== League business ==
=== Executive ===
- Harry Trihey, Shamrocks (President)
- P. M. Butler, Ottawa (1st vice-president)
- A. D. Scott, Quebec ( 2nd vice-president)
- Fred McRobie, Montreal (Secretary-Treasurer)

It was decided that league champions would not play for the Stanley Cup until after the season. If a challenge was ordered by the Cup trustees, Montreal would default the Cup. A challenge was ordered by the trustees and Montreal eventually agreed to play Winnipeg in January during regular season play.

This season saw the loss of several players to hockey leagues in the U.S., including Charlie Liffiton, Hod Stuart, Bruce Stuart, Eddie Hogan and George McCarron.

== Season ==
=== Highlights ===
This season saw several impressive rookies including Frank McGee and Art Moore for Ottawa.

The season would be a two team race between Montreal Victorias and Ottawa, splitting their matches between each other. The season ended in a tie, which necessitated a playoff, won by Ottawa to win their first Stanley Cup. At the other end of the standing, Shamrocks did not win any games.

=== Final standing ===
Note GP = Games Played, W = Wins, L = Losses, T = Ties, GF = Goals For, GA = Goals Against

Team	GP	W	L	T	GF	GA
Ottawa Hockey Club	8	6	2	0	47	26
Montreal Victorias	8	6	2	0	48	33
Montreal Hockey Club	7	4	3	0	34	19
Quebec Hockey Club	7	3	4	0	30	46
Montreal Shamrocks	8	0	8	0	21	56

=== Results ===
Month	Day	Visitor	Score	Home	Score
Jan.	3	Victorias	4	Ottawa HC	3
Jan.	3	Shamrocks	0	Montreal HC	10
Jan.	10	Ottawa HC	6	Shamrocks	1
Jan.	10	Victorias	11	Quebec HC	5
Jan.	17	Montreal HC	1	Ottawa HC	7
Jan.	17	Quebec HC	5	Shamrocks	3
Jan.	21	Montreal HC	5	Victorias	2
Jan.	24	Ottawa HC	6	Quebec HC	8
Jan.	24	Victorias	12	Shamrocks	7
Jan.	31†	Quebec HC		Montreal HC	
Feb.	4	Shamrocks	2	Ottawa HC	5
Feb.	7	Montreal HC	9	Quebec HC	3
Feb.	7	Ottawa HC	7	Victorias	6
Feb.	11	Victorias	7	Shamrocks	3
Feb.	14	Quebec HC	3	Ottawa HC	10
Feb.	14	Montreal HC	6	Shamrocks	1
Feb.	21	Ottawa HC	3	Montreal HC	1
Feb.	21	Shamrocks	4	Quebec HC	5
Feb.	25	Montreal HC	2	Victorias	3
Feb.	28	Quebec HC	1	Victorias	3

† Postponed and not played.

== Player Stats ==
=== Scoring leaders ===
Note: GP = Games played, G = Goals scored

Name	Club	GP	G
Russell Bowie	Victorias	7	22
Frank McGee	Ottawa HC	6	14
Herb Jordan	Quebec HC	7	12
Billy Gilmour	Ottawa HC	7	10
Archie Hooper	Montreal HC	6	9
Jack Marshall	Montreal HC	7	8
Blair Russel	Victorias	8	7
Dave Gilmour	Ottawa HC	4	7
Suddy Gilmour	Ottawa HC	7	7
Harry Bright	Shamrocks	8	7

=== Goaltending averages ===
Note: GP = Games played, GA = Goals against, SO = Shutouts, GAA = Goals against average

Name	Club	GP	GA	SO	GAA
Archie Lockerby	Victorias	3	6		2.0
Billy Nicholson	Montreal HC	7	19	1	2.7
Bouse Hutton	Ottawa HC	8	26	2	3.3
Jim Nichol	Victorias	5	27		5.4
Paddy Moran	Quebec HC	7	46		6.6
Patrick O'Reilly	Shamrocks	8	56		7.0

== Playoffs ==
Ottawa HC and Montreal Victorias played a two-game total-goals series.

March 7, 1903
Ottawa HC	1		Victorias	1
John "Bouse" Hutton		G	Archie Lockerby	
Harvey Pulford, Capt		P	Billy Strachan	
Arthur Moore		CP	George Fairbank	
Harry Westwick		RO	Russell Bowie, Capt	
Frank McGee		C	Bert Strachan	1
Billy Gilmour		RW	Charles Allan	
Suddy Gilmour	1	LW	Blair Russell	
Dave Gilmour		C-Sub		
Referee – Harry Trihey

March 10, 1903
Victorias	1		Ottawa HC	8
Archie Lockerby		G	John "Bouse" Hutton	
Billy Strachan		P	Harvey Pulford, Capt	
George Fairbank		CP	Arthur Moore	
Bert Strachan		RO	Frank McGee	3
Russell Bowie, Capt		C	Dave Gilmour	2
Blair Russell		LW	Billy Gilmour	1
Charles Allan		RW	Suddy Gilmour	2
Referee – Percy Quinn

== Stanley Cup challenges ==
=== Winnipeg vs. Montreal ===
Another Montreal HC vs. Winnipeg Victorias best-of-three challenge series was held in early 1903. In game one, defending champion Montreal defeated Winnipeg, 8–1. Game two was the first Stanley Cup challenge match to be replayed. Both teams skated to a 2–2 tie before the game had to be suspended at 27:00 of overtime because of a midnight curfew. It was then decided to discard the result and replay the game two days later. In the rescheduled contest, the Victorias won, 4–2, to even the series. However, Montreal won the decisive game three, 4–1, to retain the Cup.

Date	Winning Team	Score	Losing Team	Location
January 29, 1903	Montreal HC	8–1	Winnipeg Victorias	Montreal Arena
January 31, 1903	Suspended at 27:00 of overtime due to curfew and the 2–2 tie was discarded			Montreal Arena
February 2, 1903	Winnipeg Victorias	4–2	Montreal HC	Montreal Arena
February 4, 1903	Montreal HC	4–1	Winnipeg Victorias	Montreal Arena
Montreal wins best-of-three series 2 games to 1

Jan 29, 1903
Winnipeg Victorias	1		Montreal HC	8
Fred Olsen		G	Billy Nicholson	
Rod Flett		P	Billy Bellingham	
Magnus Flett		CP	Dickie Boon, Capt.	
Billy Kean		RO	Archie Hooper	4
Fred Cadham, Capt.	1	C	Jack Marshall	3
Tony Gingras	1	RW	Jimmy Gardner	
Fred Scanlon		LW	Tommy Phillips	
Referee – Percy Quinn

- Spare - Winnipeg Victorias - Dan Bain - C
- Spares - Montreal - Cecil Blachford - RW, Tom Hodge - D, Charles Liffton - RW, George Smith - RW

Jan 31, 1903 stopped at 27 minutes overtime due to Sabboth Law
Winnipeg Victorias	2		Montreal HC	2
Fred Olsen		G	Billy Nicholson	
Rod Flett		P	Tom Hodge	
Magnus Flett		CP	Dickie Boon, Capt.	
Billy Kean		RO	Archie Hooper	1
Fred Cadham, Capt.	1	C	Jack Marshall	
Tony Gingras	1	RW	Cecil Blachford	
Fred Scanlon		LW	Tommy Phillips	1
Referee – Percy Quinn

- Spare - Winnipeg Victorias - Dan Bain - C
- Spares - Montreal - Billy Bellingham - D, Jimmy Gardner - RW, Charles Liffton - RW, George Smith - RW

Feb 2, 1903
Winnipeg Victorias	4		Montreal HC	2
Fred Olsen		G	Billy Nicholson	
Rod Flett		P	Tom Hodge	
Magnus Flett		CP	Dickie Boon, Capt.	
Billy Kean	3	RO	Archie Hooper	
Fred Cadham, Capt.		C	Jack Marshall	2
Tony Gingras	1	RW	Cecil Blachford	
Fred Scanlon		LW	Tommy Phillips	
Referee – Percy Quinn

- Spare - Winnipeg Victorias - Dan Bain - C
- Spares - Montreal - Billy Bellingham - D, Jimmy Gardner - RW, Charles Liffton - RW, George Smith - RW

Feb 4, 1903
Winnipeg Victorias	1		Montreal HC	4
Fred Olsen		G	Billy Nicholson	
Rod Flett		P	Billy Bellingham	
Magnus Flett		CP	Dickie Boon, Capt.	
Billy Kean	1	RO	Archie Hooper	
Fred Cadham, Capt.		C	Jack Marshall	2
Tony Gingras		RW	George Smith	
Fred Scanlon		LW	Tommy Phillips	2
Referee – Percy Quinn

- Spare - Winnipeg Victorias - Dan Bain - C
- Spares - Montreal - Cecil Blachford - D, Jimmy Gardner - RW, Tom Hodge - D, Charles Liffton - RW,

=== Rat Portage vs. Ottawa HC ===
Ottawa defeated the Rat Portage Thistles 6–2, 4–2 (10–4) in a two-game, total goals series in Ottawa, March 12–14, 1903.

As the new CAHL and Cup champions, the Ottawas accepted a challenge from the Rat Portage Thistles of the Manitoba & Northwestern Hockey Association (MNWHA). Entering the best-of-three challenge series, the Thistles were younger and quicker than Ottawa; only one player on the Thistles was over the age of 20. Any chance that those factors could have helped the team was negated by soft ice conditions. Ottawa swept the series with scores of 6–2 and 4–2.

Date	Winning Team	Score	Losing Team	Location
March 12, 1903	Ottawa HC	6–2	Rat Portage Thistles	Dey's Arena
March 14, 1903	Ottawa HC	4–2	Rat Portage Thistles	Dey's Arena
Ottawa HC wins best-of-three series two games to none

March 12, 1903
Rat Portage	2		Ottawa HC	6
Fred Dulmage		G	John "Bouse" Hutton	
Mat Brown		P	Harvey Pulford, Capt	
Tom Hooper, Capt		CP	Arthur Moore	
Si Griffis		RO	Dave Gilmour	1
Billy McGimsie	2	C	Frank McGee	2
Bill Martin		LW	Billy Gilmour	3
Roxy Beaudro		RW	Suddy Gilmour	
Referee- Harry Trihey

March 14, 1903
Rat Portage	2		Ottawa HC	4
Fred Dulmage		G	John "Bouse" Hutton	
Mat Brown		P	Harvey Pulford, Capt	
Tom Hooper, Capt		CP	Dave Gilmour	1
Si Griffis		RO	Frank McGee	2
Billy McGimsie	1	C	Percy Sims	1
Bill Martin		RW	Billy Gilmour	
Roxy Beaudro	1	LW	Suddy Gilmour	
Referee- Chauncy Kirby

For their win, the Ottawa players would each receive a silver nugget. From that point on the team would also be known as the Silver Seven.

== Stanley Cup engravings ==
1903 Montreal Hockey Club
Players
Forwards
Cecil Blachford (right wing)
Jimmy Gardner (left-right wing)
Charlie Liffiton (right wing)
Tommy Phillips (left wing)
George Smith (right wing)
Jack Marshall (center)
Archie Hooper (rover)
Defencemen
Billy Bellingham (point)
Dickie Boon (cover point-captain)
Tom Hodge (point-cover point)
Goaltender
Billy Nicholson

non-players=

- Charles G. Chitty (President), Clarence McKerrow (manager), Desse Browne (coach)
- Harry C. Dewitt (Hon. Secretary/Treasurer), Frank Bickerdike (director)
- George A. James (director), Paul Lefebvre (trainer)

1903 Ottawa Hockey Club
Players
Forwards
Hamilton Billy Gilmour (right wing)
Sutherland Suddy Gilmour (left wing)
Harry Westwick (also played rover)
Percy Sims (center)
Frank McGee (center-rover)
Dave Gilmour(rover-cover point)
Defencemen
Harvey Pulford (point-Captain)
Arthur Fraser (point-cover point)
Arthur Moore (cover point)
Frank Wood (point-cover point)
Charles Spittal
Goaltender
John "Bouse" Hutton

non-players=

- Percy M. Butler (President), Robert T. "Bob" Shillington (Manager)
- Alf Smith (Coach), Archie P. Mutchmor (Treasurer)†
- Martin Rosenthal (Secretary), Halder Kirby (Club Doctor), Llewellyn Bates (Vice President)
- W.H. Hutton†, Chauncy Kirby, Jack Smith, Charles Sparks (Directors)
- Mac McGilton (Ass't Trainer), Pete Green (Trainer)
- Alf Smith did not play for Ottawa in 1903. However he was playing-coach for Ottawa Silver Sevens next 3 Stanley Cup winning seasons

† one executive first name remain unknown

== See also ==
- List of Stanley Cup champions

Preceded by Montreal Hockey Club; 1902	Montreal Hockey Club; Stanley Cup Champions; January 1903	Succeeded by Ottawa HC; 1903
Preceded by Montreal Hockey Club; January 1903	Ottawa Hockey Club; 1903 Stanley Cup Champions; 1903	Succeeded by Ottawa Hockey Club; 1904
Preceded by 1902 CAHL season	CAHL seasons 1903	Succeeded by 1904-05 FAHL season
