= 1902 CAHL season =

- League: Canadian Amateur Hockey League
- Sport: Ice hockey
- Duration: January 5 – March 1, 1902
- Teams: 5

1902
- Champions: Montreal Hockey Club
- Top scorer: Archie Hooper (17 goals)

CAHL seasons
- ← 1901 1903 →

The 1902 Canadian Amateur Hockey League (CAHL) season was the fourth season of the league. Teams played an eight-game schedule. The Montreal HC were the league champion with a record of six wins and two losses. After the season, Montreal HC challenged the Winnipeg Victorias for the Stanley Cup title and were victorious.

== League business ==
=== Executive ===
- George R. James, Montreal (President)
- A. D. Scott, Quebec (1st vice-president)
- N. Charles Sparks, Ottawa ( 2nd vice-president)
- Harry Trihey, Shamrocks(Secretary-Treasurer)

New fines were added for being more than 15 minutes late for a game and forfeiting.

The clubs demanded an increase in gate receipts share from 33% to 40% and a higher number of free tickets from the Montreal Arena owners, but settled for the increase in tickets only.

Source: Coleman, p. 68

== Season ==
The Shamrocks team, which had won the Stanley Cup only two seasons prior, was completely new. While Fred Scanlan went to Winnipeg, Harry Trihey, Arthur Farrell, Frank Wall, Frank Tansey, James McKenna and Jack Brannen all retired from competitive ice hockey. The team sank to the bottom of the standings.

=== Highlights ===
Montreal would win the league led by their big line of Archie Hooper, Jack Marshall, Jimmy Gardner and Charlie Liffiton. The players would earn their nickname of the 'Little Men of Iron', winning the Stanley Cup in a challenge with Winnipeg. Hooper would score nine goals against the Shamrocks on January 5, on his way to winning the scoring title.

=== Final standing ===
Note GP = Games Played, W = Wins, L = Losses, T = Ties, GF = Goals For, GA = Goals Against

Team	GP	W	L	T	GF	GA
Montreal Hockey Club	8	6	2	0	39	15
Ottawa Hockey Club	8	5	3	0	35	15
Montreal Victorias	8	4	4	0	36	25
Quebec Hockey Club	8	4	4	0	26	34
Montreal Shamrocks	8	1	7	0	15	62

=== Results ===
Month	Day	Visitor	Score	Home	Score
Jan.	5	Victorias	4	Ottawa HC	5
Jan.	5	Montreal HC	14	Shamrocks	0
Jan.	11	Ottawa HC	1	Shamrocks	2
Jan.	11	Victorias	9	Quebec HC	5
Jan.	18	Montreal HC	4	Ottawa HC	2
Jan.	18	Quebec HC	6	Shamrocks	2
Jan.	22	Victorias	3	Montreal HC	2
Jan.	25	Ottawa HC	1	Quebec HC	2
Jan.	25	Shamrocks	2	Victorias	9
Feb.	1	Quebec HC	2	Montreal HC	3
Feb.	1	Shamrocks	0	Ottawa HC	12
Feb.	8	Montreal HC	7	Quebec HC	1
Feb.	8	Ottawa HC	3	Victorias	2
Feb.	12	Victorias	8	Shamrocks	2
Feb.	15	Quebec HC	0	Ottawa HC	8
Feb.	15	Montreal HC	5	Shamrocks	4
Feb.	22	Ottawa HC	3	Montreal HC	1
Feb.	22	Shamrocks	3	Quebec HC	7
Feb.	26 (†)	Montreal HC	3	Victorias	0
Mar.	1	Quebec HC	3	Victorias	1

† Montreal HC clinches league championship.

== Player Stats ==
=== Scoring leaders ===
Note: GP = Games played, G = Goals Scored

Name	Club	GP	G
Archie Hooper	Montreal HC	8	17
Russell Bowie	Victorias	7	13
Jack Marshall	Montreal HC	8	11
Rat Westwick	Ottawa HC	8	11
Bruce Stuart	Ottawa HC	8	9
Blair Russel	Victorias	8	9
Charlie Liffiton	Montreal HC	8	8
Harold Henry	Ottawa HC	8	6
Edward Stuart	Victorias	6	6
Percy Lemesurier	Quebec HC	4	5

=== Goaltending averages ===
Note: GP = Games played, GA = Goals against, SO = Shutouts, GAA = Goals against average

Name	Club	GP	GA	SO	GAA
Billy Nicholson	Montreal	8	15	2	1.7
Bouse Hutton	Ottawa	8	15	2	1.7
Archie Lockerby	Victorias	6	15		2.5
Fred Munro	Victorias	2	10		5.0
Paddy Moran	Quebec HC	7	46		6.5
Patrick O'Reilly	Shamrocks	8	62		7.8

=== Exhibitions ===
The Ottawa Hockey Club travelled to New York after the season for an exhibition series. Ottawa defeated the Hockey Club of New York 4–3 on March 21, 1902. Ottawa lost to the New York Athletic Club 6–3 on March 23. Both games were at the St. Nicholas Rink.

== Stanley Cup challenges ==
=== Winnipeg vs. Montreal ===
After the Montreal HC won the 1902 CAHL title in March, they promptly sent a challenge to the Winnipeg Victorias. In game one of the best-of-three series, Winnipeg shut out Montreal, 1–0. However, Montreal shut out Winnipeg in game two, 5–0, and then held on to a 2–1 victory in game three. With the victory, the Montreal club won the Cup for the first time since 1894.

Jack Marshall of Montreal, who had played for the Winnipeg team in the previous year, faced his old team and scored three goals, including the series clincher. Archie Hooper also scored three for Montreal.

Date	Winning Team	Score	Losing Team	Location
March 13, 1902	Winnipeg Victorias	1–0	Montreal HC	Winnipeg Auditorium
March 15, 1902	Montreal HC	5–0	Winnipeg Victorias	Winnipeg Auditorium
March 17, 1902	Montreal HC	2–1	Winnipeg Victorias	Winnipeg Auditorium
Montreal wins best-of-three series 2 games to 1

March 13, 1902
Montreal	0		Winnipeg	1
Billy Nicholson		G	Art Brown	
Tom Hodge		P	Rod Flett	
Dickie Boon, Capt		CP	Magnus Flett	
Archie Hooper		RO	Fred Cadham	
Jack Marshall		C	Burke Wood	
Charles Liffiton		RW	Tony Gingras	1
Jimmy Gardner		LW	Fred Scanlan	
Billy Bellingham		Spare	Dan Bain, Capt.	
Roland Elliot		Spare	Charles Johnston	
George Smith		Spare		
Referee- W. MacFarlane

March 15, 1902
Montreal	5		Winnipeg	0
Billy Nicholson		G	Art Brown	
Billy Bellingham		P	Rod Flett	
Dickie Boon, Capt		CP	Magnus Flett	
Archie Hooper	2	RO	Fred Cadham	
Jack Marshall	2	C	Burke Wood	
Charles Liffiton	1	RW	Tony Gingras	
Jimmy Gardner		LW	Fred Scanlan	
George Smith		Spare	Dan Bain, Capt.	
Roland Elliot		Spare	Charles Johnston	
Referee- W. MacFarlane

March 17, 1902
Montreal	2		Winnipeg	1
Billy Nicholson		G	Art Brown	
Billy Bellingham		P	Red Flett	
Dickie Boon		CP	Magnus Flett	
Archie Hooper	1	RO	Fred Cadham	
Jack Marshall	1	C	Burke Wood	
Charles Liffiton		RW	Tony Gingras	1
Jimmy Gardner		LW	Fred Scanlan	
George Smith		Spare	Dan Bain, Capt.	
Roland Elliot		Spare	Charles Johnston	
Referee- W. MacFarlane

== Stanley Cup engraving ==
1902 Montreal Hockey Club
Forwards
Jimmy Gardner (left wing)
Charles Liffiton (right wing)
George Smith † (left-right wing)
Jack Marshall (center)
Archie Hooper (rover)
Defencemen
Billy Bellingham (point)
Dickie Boon (cover point-captain)
Roland Elliot (point)
Tom Hodge (point)
Goaltender
Billy Nicholson

- † Did not play-on team picture

non-players=

- Harry L. Shaw (President), Clarence McKerrow (Manager-Coach)
- Allan Cameron Jr. (Vice President), Paul Lefebvre (Trainer)
- Harry Herbert Marsden (H. H. M.) Andrews (Director), Charles G. Chitty (Director),
- Harry C. Dewitt (Hon. Secretary/Treasurer)

== See also ==
- List of Stanley Cup champions

Preceded by Winnipeg Victorias; January 1902	Montreal Hockey Club; 1902 Stanley Cup Champions; 1902	Succeeded by Montreal Hockey Club; January 1903
Preceded by 1901 CAHL season	CAHL seasons 1902	Succeeded by 1903 CAHL season
