= Grover Sargent =

Canadian ice hockey player

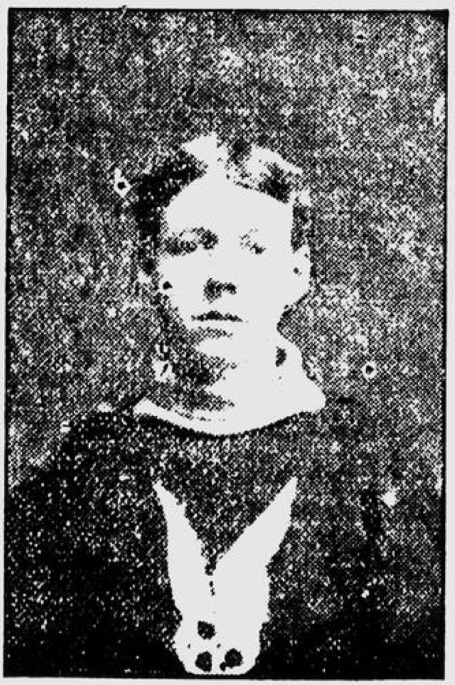
- Sargent with MAAA, c. 1905
- Born: September 8, 1884 Montreal, Quebec, Canada
- Died: November 28, 1957 (aged 73) Beaconsfield, Quebec, Canada
- Position: Centre
- Played for: Montreal Hockey Club; Winnipeg Victorias
- Playing career: 1903–1916

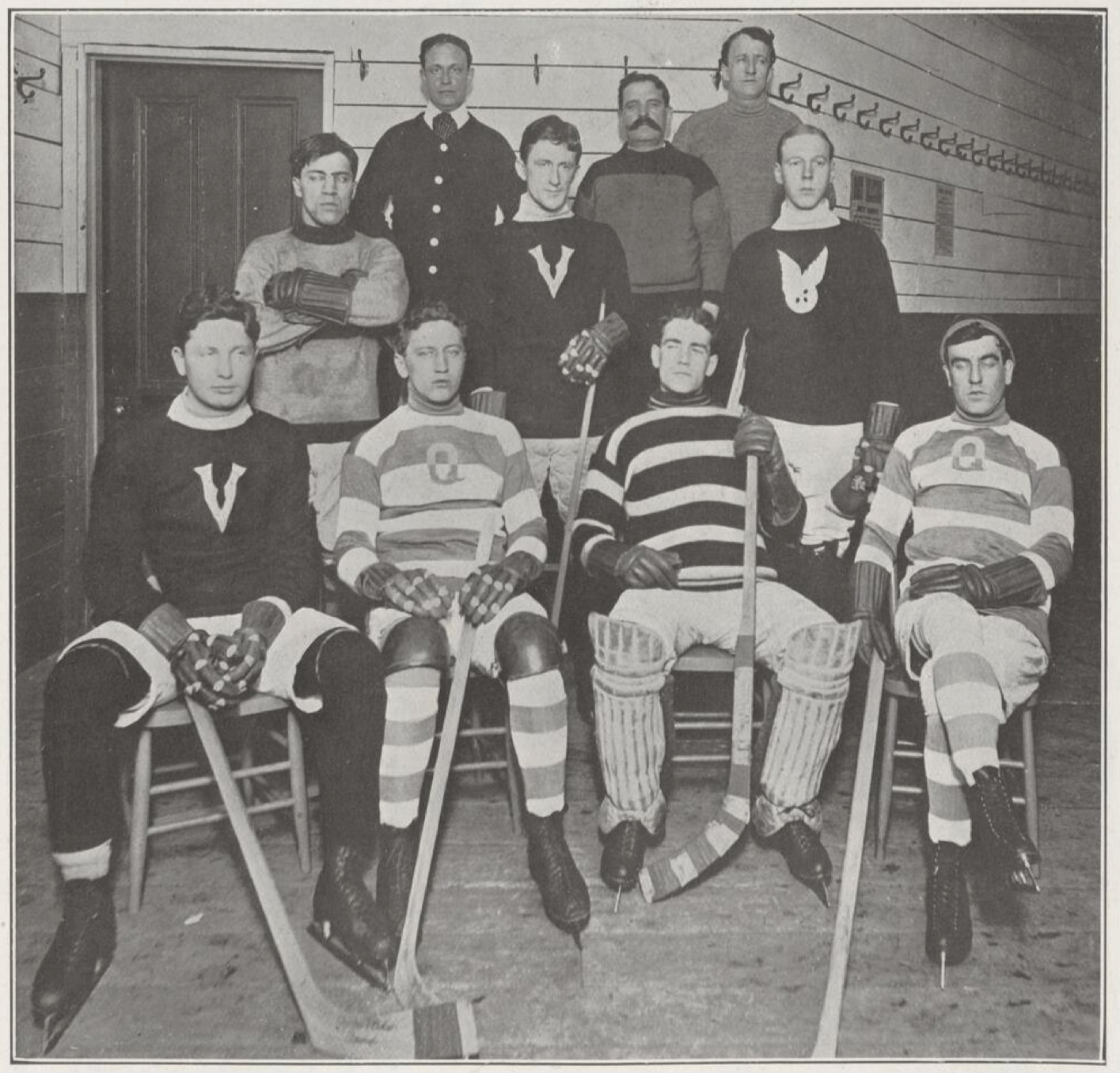
Sargent, at right in the middle row, with the ECAHA All-Stars for the Hod Stuart Memorial Game in January 1908.

Grover Stewart Sargent (September 8, 1884 – November 28, 1957) was a Canadian amateur ice hockey player, primarily with the Montreal Hockey Club (MAAA) in the Canadian Amateur Hockey League (CAHL) and Eastern Canada Amateur Hockey Association (ECAHA).

== Biography ==
Sargent, a centre forward, was active as a senior player from 1903–1916. In January 1908 he participated in a benefit All-Star game, hosted by the Eastern Canada Amateur Hockey Association, for the family of deceased hockey player Hod Stuart, who had died in June 1907 in a diving accident. Montreal Wanderers won the game against the ECAHA All-Stars 10 goals to 7.

He died in 1957, aged 73, and is buried at Lakeview Memorial Gardens in Pointe-Claire, Quebec.
