= Charlie Liffiton =

Canadian ice hockey player

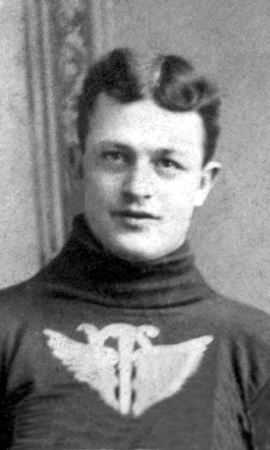
- Liffiton with the Portage Lakes HC.
- Born: December 14, 1878; Montreal, Quebec, Canada
- Died: August 11, 1941 (aged 62); Montreal, Quebec, Canada
- Height: 5 ft 7 in (170 cm)
- Weight: 170 lb (77 kg; 12 st 2 lb)
- Position: Right Wing
- Shot: Right
- Played for: WPHL; Pittsburgh Bankers; IPHL; Portage Lakes Hockey Club; NHA; Montreal Wanderers; Montreal Hockey Club; Exhibition; Toronto Professionals
- Playing career: 1899–1907

Charles Albert Liffiton (December 14, 1878 – August 11, 1941) was an early professional ice hockey player. Over the span of his career he played for the Montreal Hockey Club, the professional Pittsburgh Bankers of the Western Pennsylvania Hockey League, the Toronto Professionals of the Ontario Professional Hockey League and the Portage Lakes Hockey Club of the International Professional Hockey League.

== Biography ==
Charlie Liffiton was the son of a jeweler and grew up in a family of one sister and six brothers. He worked in his father's jewelry and confection store in Montreal, but preferred playing hockey. During the 1899–1900 season of the Canadian Amateur Hockey League Charlie was the second best scorer for his Montreal Hockey Club and the league's eighth leading scorer posting 8 goals in 8 games. However, during the 1901–02 season, he helped the Montreal HC win the CAHL championship and later defeat the Winnipeg Victorias and capture the Stanley Cup. He was also one of the top ten league scorers for the third season in a row.

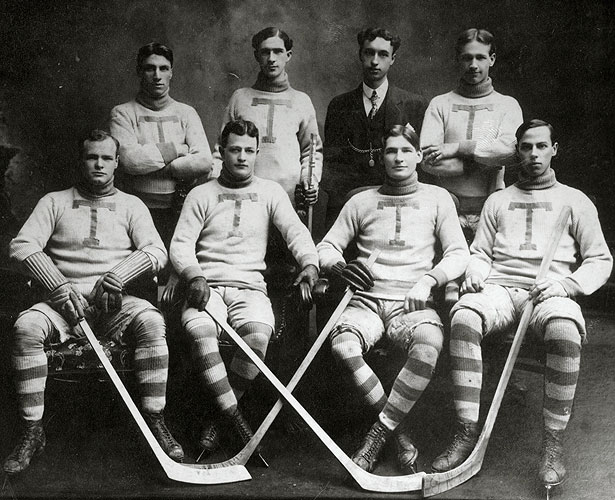
Charlie Liffiton, second from left in the front row, with the Toronto Professionals in the 1906–07 season.

Liffiton played only one game of the 1902–03 season for Montreal, before traveling to Pittsburgh, Pennsylvania to help the Pittsburgh Bankers win the Western Pennsylvania Hockey League championship. The WPHL was a professional league and by playing there, Charlie became a professional player. Over the next two season, he played for the Bankers and at least one match for the Montreal Wanderers.

In 1904 the Portgage Lakes Hockey Club of Houghton, Michigan lured him away from the Wanderers to play the remainder of the season for $1350. He was reported to be the highest paid player in the International Professional Hockey League that year. Statistics from his hockey career show he was active through the 1906–07 professional exhibition season with the Toronto Professionals.

== Family ==
His younger brother was Ernie Liffiton who also played professional ice hockey. He is an ancestor of David Liffiton of the Colorado Avalanche and New York Rangers. Around 1916, Charlie married Lena Margaret Clark. The couple had five children. It was also around 1916, that Charlie began his own business building automobile garages.

== Stanley Cup engraving ==
While Charlie is a Stanley Cup champion, his name is not on the Cup. 1902 is one of the few years when only the team's name was engraved on the Cup, not each player's.
