= Dickie Boon =

Canadian ice hockey player and manager (1878–1961)

- Hockey Hall of Fame, 1952
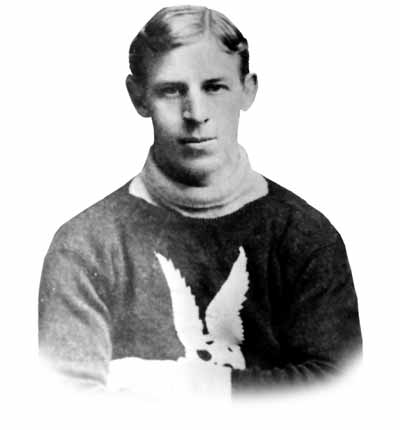
- Born: January 10, 1878 Belleville, Ontario, Canada
- Died: May 3, 1961 (aged 83) Outremont, Quebec, Canada
- Height: 5 ft 5 in (165 cm)
- Weight: 130 lb (59 kg; 9 st 4 lb)
- Position: Defence
- Played for: Montreal Wanderers; Montreal HC
- Playing career: 1899–1906

Richard Robinson Boon (January 10, 1878 – May 3, 1961) was a Canadian ice hockey forward and manager. He played for the Montreal Hockey Club (Montreal HC) of the Canadian Amateur Hockey League (CAHL) and the Montreal Wanderers of the Federal Amateur Hockey League (FAHL) in the early 1900s. He was a player on two Stanley Cup winning teams and managed the Wanderers to four Cup titles. Boon was uncle to Lucille Wheeler-Vaughan, Canadian and world ski champion.

== Early life ==
Born in Belleville, Ontario, he was one of seven children, four boys and three girls. Boon moved with his family to Montreal, where he became involved in several sports in his youth. He was a proficient speed skater, winning the 1892 Junior Amateur Championship. He was also involved in rowing and canoeing. The family home was on the present site of the Windsor train station in Montreal.

== Hockey career ==
In 1894, at the age of 16, Boon began playing organized hockey with the "Young Crystals" at the old Crystal Rink in Montreal with another Hall of Famer, Mike Grant. In 1897, he joined the Monarch Hockey Club. In 1900 he joined the Montreal Hockey Club of the Montreal Amateur Athletic Association's junior club. The following year he was promoted to the senior team. He played the position of cover point, similar to today's defenceman. Considered to be 'fast and wiry', Boon is credited with being the first player to use the poke check, which he used to great success in stopping opposing forwards.

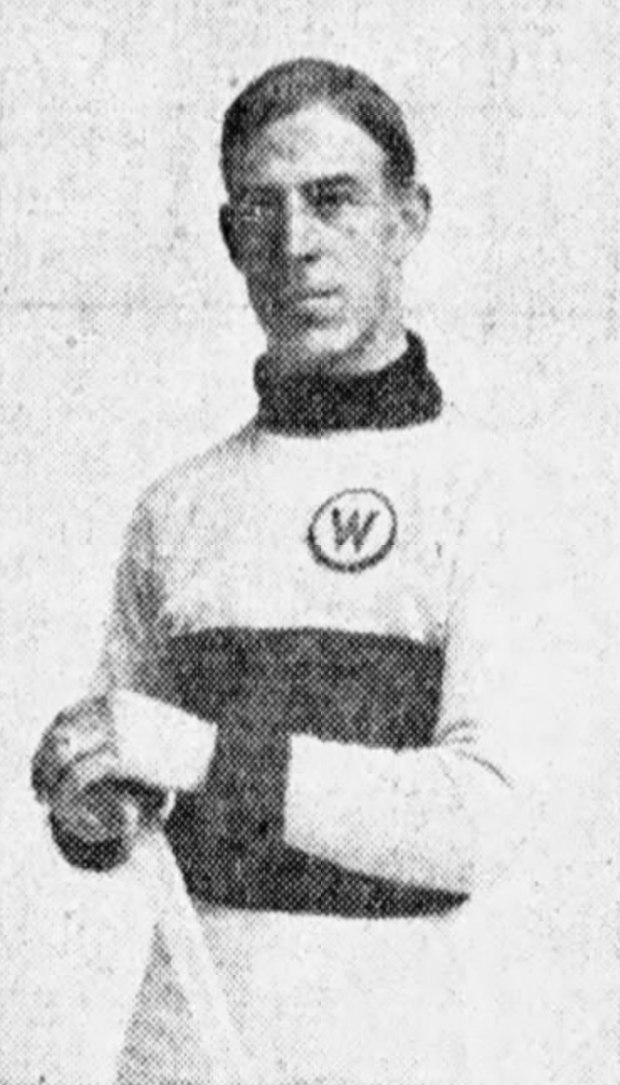
Boon with the Montreal Wanderers.

Boon was the captain of the two-time Stanley Cup-winning Montreal HC teams of 1902 and 1903 which had several other future Hall of Famers including Jimmy Gardner, Tommy Phillips and Jack Marshall. He was effective despite being the smallest player on the team. Like many other members of the team dubbed the "Little Men of Iron", Boon left Montreal HC in December 1903 to found the Montreal Wanderers in the new Federal Amateur Hockey League (FAHL). He played with the club until 1905. At that point, professionalism was taking hold in hockey and Boon dropped out of playing hockey after the objections of his parents to him becoming a professional. He then turned to management of the Wanderers and he managed the club until 1916. He led the Wanderers to four Stanley Cup titles in 1906, 1907, 1908, and 1910 as Manager. Although Boon was a multiple winner of the Stanley Cup, he was not happy with it interfering in the season of play. In 1903, he was quoted as saying: "The Cup is far from beneficial to the game, it is detrimental."

In 1910, Boon, along with Jimmy Gardner was instrumental in setting up the National Hockey Association (NHA) (predecessor of today's National Hockey League (NHL)) when the Wanderers were refused entry into the new Canadian Hockey Association (CHA), along with Renfrew. Gardner, Boon and Ambrose O'Brien conceived of founding the NHA on the spot, after the CHA had met to expel the Wanderers and in the same hotel, the Windsor Hotel in Montreal. The NHA would be innovative in making professional hockey more business-like.

In 1924, Boon was approached by James Strachan, former owner of the Wanderers and part-owner of the new Montreal Hockey Club franchise entering the National Hockey League to negotiate the use of the name "Wanderers" for the new team. The negotiations were unsuccessful and the team was instead nameless, until the nickname "Maroons" came into use, after the colour of their sweaters.

== After hockey ==
After retiring from playing hockey, Boon became a co-founder of the Boon-Strachan Coal business, and he took up curling and golf. He was a long-time member of the Outremont Curling Club and the Club's Boon Trophy was named after him. In 1954, he was named one of Montreal's outstanding sportsmen by the Sportsmen's Association of Montreal.

He died at his Outremont, Quebec, home on May 3, 1961, after being in poor health for several months. He had continued to curl until 1959, when he was injured in a golf cart accident that fractured his pelvis. He continued playing golf until the fall of 1960 not long before his death. Boon was survived by his widow Kathleen Fitzgerald. He was later buried at Mount Royal Cemetery in Montreal.

== Career statistics ==
			Regular season					Playoffs
Season	Team	League	GP	G	A	Pts	PIM	GP	G	A	Pts	PIM
1899–1900	Montreal HC	CAHL	8	2	0	2	0	—	—	—	—	—
1900–01	Montreal HC	CAHL	7	3	0	3	0	—	—	—	—	—
1901–02	Montreal HC	CAHL	8	2	0	2	6	—	—	—	—	—
1901–02	Montreal HC	St-Cup	—	—	—	—	—	3	0	0	0	3
1902–03	Montreal HC	CAHL	7	3	0	3	6	—	—	—	—	—
1902–03	Montreal HC	St-Cup	—	—	—	—	—	4	0	0	0	10
1903–04	Montreal Wanderers	FAHL	4	0	0	0	0	—	—	—	—	—
1904–05	Montreal Wanderers	FAHL	8	0	0	0	6	—	—	—	—	—
CAHL totals			30	10	0	10	12	—	—	—	—	—
FAHL totals			12	0	0	0	6	—	—	—	—	—

Source: Hockey Hall of Fame

== Awards and achievements ==
- 1952 – Inducted into the Hockey Hall of Fame
- 1954 – Named one of Montreal's outstanding sportsmen by the Sportsmen's Association of Montreal
