= Reginald Hooper =

Canadian ice hockey player

- Born: February 27, 1879; Buckland Monachorum, England
- Died: May 3, 1958 (aged 79); Canada
- Position: Forward
- Played for: Quebec Bulldogs
- Playing career: 1899–1912

Reginald Thomas Hooper (February 27, 1879 – May 3, 1958) was an English-born Canadian professional ice hockey player. He played with the Quebec Bulldogs of the National Hockey Association during the 1910–11 season.

He was the older brother of Archie Hooper.
