= Archie Hooper =

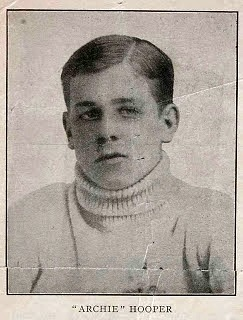
- Born: September 17, 1881 Saint-Lambert, Quebec, Canada
- Died: October 11, 1904 (aged 23) Saint-Lambert, Quebec, Canada
- Position: Rover
- Played for: Montreal Hockey Club
- Playing career: 1901–1903

Archibald "Archie" William Hooper (September 11, 1881 – October 11, 1904) was a Canadian amateur ice hockey player in the early years of the sport. He was a member of the Montreal Hockey Club that won the Stanley Cup in 1902 and 1903, a team popularly known as the 'Little Men of Iron'. He died at age 23 after only three years of senior hockey play. Hooper is believed to be the first ice hockey player to die from a hockey-related injury.

== Personal life ==
Hooper was born in Saint-Lambert, Quebec, one of six children. He was brother to Charles, Bruce, Reginald, Allan and Harley. In February 1903, Hooper was injured in an ice hockey game and he never fully recovered. In July 1904, he was admitted to Royal Victoria Hospital and he stayed there 'for a period' and was then released to go home, where he died in October 1904.

== Playing career ==
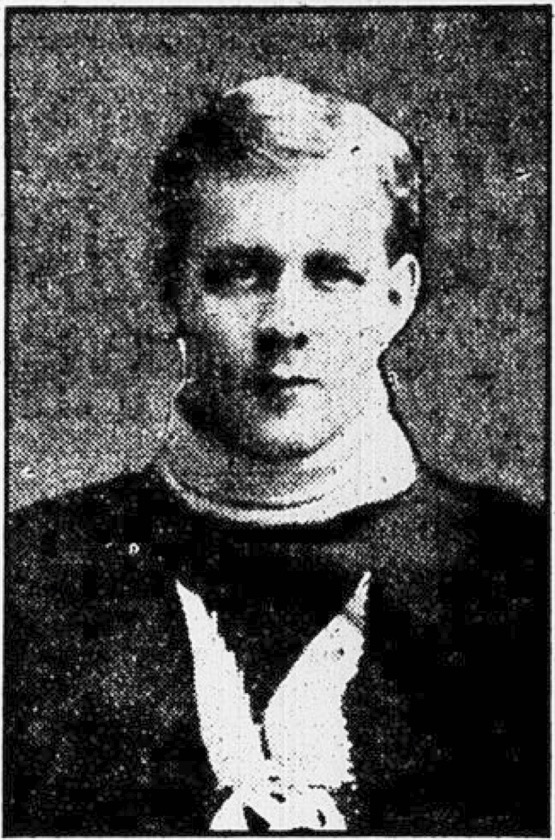
Hooper in uniform with the Montreal Hockey Club.

Hooper had a short but productive ice hockey career. He joined the senior Montreal HC squad in 1901. That 1902 CAHL season he led the league with 17 goals in 8 games and Montreal HC won the league championship. After the league play, Montreal challenged the Stanley Cup champion Winnipeg Victorias and defeated them to win the championship. The series with Winnipeg earned the Montreal HC the nickname 'Little Men of Iron' for their steadfast defence in the final game of 1902 when Montreal was ahead by one goal in the final game of the challenge and Winnipeg was pressing to score, as well as for the diminutive stature of many of the team's players. It was the first time since 1894 that Montreal HC had won the Stanley Cup.

In the following 1903 CAHL season, Montreal HC defeated Winnipeg in a rematch Stanley Cup challenge, but Hooper and Montreal did not repeat as league champions. Although injured in February, Hooper scored ten goals in six games of league play and five goals in four games of Stanley Cup play.

After the 1903 season, many of the Montreal HC players left to join the new Montreal Wanderers. Hooper was the only regular player to stay with the team and was named Captain. The rest of the team was restocked with new players from the junior ranks. The 1904 season would be Hooper's last. He played five games and scored six goals, but was injured when he was hit on the head by a hockey puck. He would eventually die from the injury on October 11, 1904.
