= Steve Vair =

Canadian ice hockey player (1886–1959)

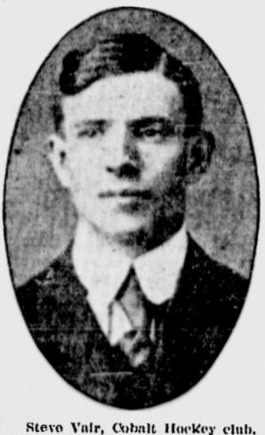
- Steve Vair around 1910.
- Born: October 11, 1886; Barrie, Ontario, Canada
- Died: July 27, 1959 (aged 72); Barrie, Ontario, Canada
- Height: 5 ft 8 in (173 cm)
- Weight: 145 lb (66 kg; 10 st 5 lb)
- Position: Centre
- Shot: Right
- Played for: Montreal Wanderers; Cobalt Silver Kings; Toronto Tecumsehs; Renfrew Creamery Kings
- Playing career: 1903–1913

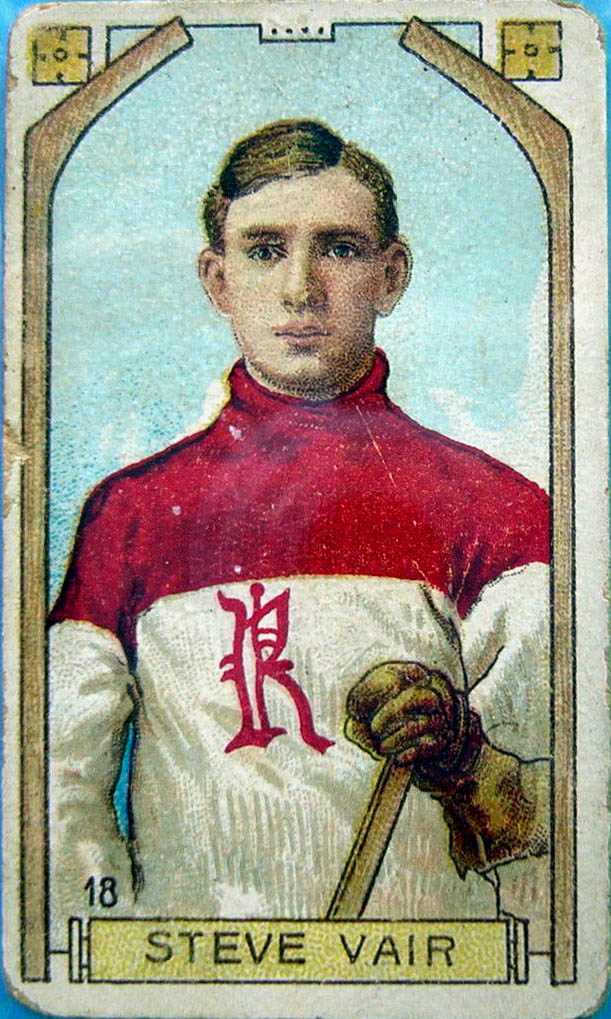
A trading card featuring Steve Vair with the Renfrew Creamery Kings.

Stephen James Bertram Vair (October 11, 1886 – July 27, 1959) was a Canadian professional ice hockey player who played in various professional and amateur leagues, including the National Hockey Association. Amongst the teams he played with were the Montreal Wanderers, Cobalt Silver Kings, Toronto Tecumsehs, and Renfrew Creamery Kings.

After his playing career Vair acted as a referee in the National Hockey League.
