= 1904 FAHL season =

Canadian ice hockey league season

The inaugural 1904 Federal Amateur Hockey League (FAHL) season lasted from January 6 until February 24. Four teams played a six game schedule.

The FAHL had been formed on December 5, 1903. Three of the four teams had been rejected for membership by the Canadian Amateur Hockey League (CAHL), while the fourth – the Montreal Wanderers – was a new team composed of disillusioned players from two Montreal-based CAHL teams.

== Regular season ==
In their first season as a franchise, the Wanderers would dominate the regular season, going undefeated. Due to an unusual twist, the Wanderers would have to share the league championship with the Ottawa Hockey Club (HC) of the CAHL (see below).

=== Highlights ===
Jack Marshall of Wanderers would score six goals against the Capitals on January 20.

=== Final standing ===
Team	Games played	Wins	Losses	Ties	Goals For	Goals Against
Montreal Wanderers	6	6	0	0	38	18
Montreal Le National	6	3	3	0	27	27
Cornwall HC	6	2	4	0	20	27
Ottawa Capitals	6	1	5	0	28	41

=== Results ===
Month	Day	Visitor	Score	Home	Score
Jan.	6	Cornwall	3	Le National	5
Jan.	13	Le National	5	Capitals	8
Jan.	15	Wanderers	5	Cornwall	1
Jan.	20	Capitals	6	Wanderers	10
Jan.	27	Cornwall	5	Capitals	4
Jan.	27	Le National	2	Wanderers	4
Feb.	3	Capitals	3	Cornwall	7
Feb.	3	Wanderers	7	Le National	3
Feb.	10	Capitals	4	Le National	10
Feb.	18 (†)	Cornwall	3	Wanderers	8
Feb.	20	Wanderers	4	Capitals	3
Feb.	24	Le National	2	Cornwall	1

† Wanderers lock down League Championship.

== Player Statistics ==
=== Scoring leaders ===
Note: GP = Games played, G = Goals scored

Name	Club	GP	G
Jack Marshall	Wanderers	4	11
Edgar Dey	Capitals	6	11
Ken Mallen	Wanderers & Cornwall	6	10
Alphonse Prevost	Le National	6	9
Percy Sims	Capitals	5	9
Jack Laviolette	Nationals	6	8
"Pokey" Leahy	Wanderers	5	7
Jimmy Gardner	Wanderers	6	5
Ed Decarie	Le National	6	5
Fred Strike	Wanderers	2	4

=== Goaltender averages ===
Note: GP = Games played, GA = Goals against, SO = Shutouts, GAA = Goals against average

Name	Club	GP	GA	SO	GAA
Billy Nicholson	Wanderers	6	18	0	3.0
Grenier	Capitals	1	4	0	4.0
Jack Hunter	Cornwall	6	27	0	4.5
Henri Menard	Le National	6	27	0	4.5
Moffatt	Capitals	2	12	0	6.0
Alex Cope	Capitals	2	15	0	7.5
Hurdman	Capitals	1	10	0	10.0

== League championship and Stanley Cup challenge ==
Just days after the FAHL regular season was finished, the reigning Stanley Cup champion Ottawa Hockey Club (HC) left the CAHL and joined the FAHL. The Wanderers, FAHL regular season champions, immediately played Ottawa HC for the combined Stanley Cup/FAHL championship.

=== Wanderers vs. Ottawa ===
A two-game series between the Montreal Wanderers from FAHL and Ottawa Hockey Club from CAHL was arranged, for the Stanley Cup. The teams played the first game in Montreal to a tie of 5–5. Montreal refused to play overtime, demanding that the game be considered a no-contest and proposed that the series start over as a best two-of-three series. The Cup trustees demanded that the series continued as scheduled and the Wanderers abandoned the challenge.

Date	Winning Team	Score	Losing Team	Location
March 2, 1904	Ended in a 5–5 tie			Montreal Arena
Ottawa wins series; Montreal is disqualified for refusing to play second game in Ottawa.

According to the Gazette, the game saw "the dirtiest game ever seen between two senior teams at the Arena." Thirty-six penalties were called. Leahy was injured and replaced by Mallan. James Strachan, president of the Wanderers was quoted as saying that the Wanderers would not go to Ottawa and play with Dr. Kearns as referee. Ottawa took a 2–0 lead, before the Wanderers scored five in a row. The Ottawas came back with three, the final goal by Frank McGee.

March 2, 1904
Ottawa (5)			Montreal (5)	
Player	G	Pos	Player	G
John "Bouse" Hutton		G	Billy Nicholson	
Jim McGee		P	Bert Strachan	
Alf Smith		CP	Billy Bellingham	
Harry "Rat" Westwick	2	R	Thomas Leahy, Ken Mallan	1; 1
Frank McGee	1	C	Jack Marshall	1
Billy Gilmour	1	RW	Jimmy Gardner	1
Suddy Gilmour	1	LW	Cecil Blatchford	1
Referee - Dr. Kearns; Umpires - Stevens, Baskerville

Source: Montreal Gazette

The Wanderers demanded a replay of the game to be held in Montreal, which Ottawa refused. The series was cancelled, with Ottawa retained the Stanley Cup championship. Ottawa then joined FAHL in the offseason.

== Exhibition ==
After the season, the Wanderers travelled to Michigan to play the Portage Lakes Hockey Club pro club. The Wanderers lost to Portage Lakes 8-4 and 9-2 in a series dubbed the "World Championship" locally. The Wanderers next travelled to Pittsburgh to play the Pittsburgh Victorias. Pittsburgh won 4-2, and 6-4.

== See also ==
- 1903–04 Montreal Wanderers season
- 1904 CAHL season
- List of pre-NHL seasons

Preceded by none	FAHL seasons 1904	Succeeded by 1904–05 FAHL season
