= Cecil Blachford =

Canadian ice hockey player

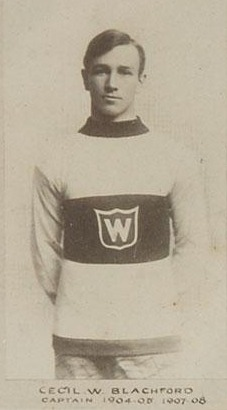
- Born: June 24, 1880 Montreal, Quebec, Canada
- Died: May 10, 1965 (aged 84) Montreal, Quebec, Canada
- Height: 5 ft 8 in (173 cm)
- Weight: 174 lb (79 kg; 12 st 6 lb)
- Position: Rover/Winger
- Shot: Left
- Played for: Montreal AAA; Montreal Wanderers
- Playing career: 1902–1910

Cecil William Blachford (June 24, 1880 – May 10, 1965) was a Canadian professional ice hockey forward player who played for the Montreal Hockey Club and the Montreal Wanderers. He was a member of Stanley Cup-winning teams in 1903, 1906, 1907, 1908 and 1910, and captain of the 1906 to 1908 teams.

== Playing career ==
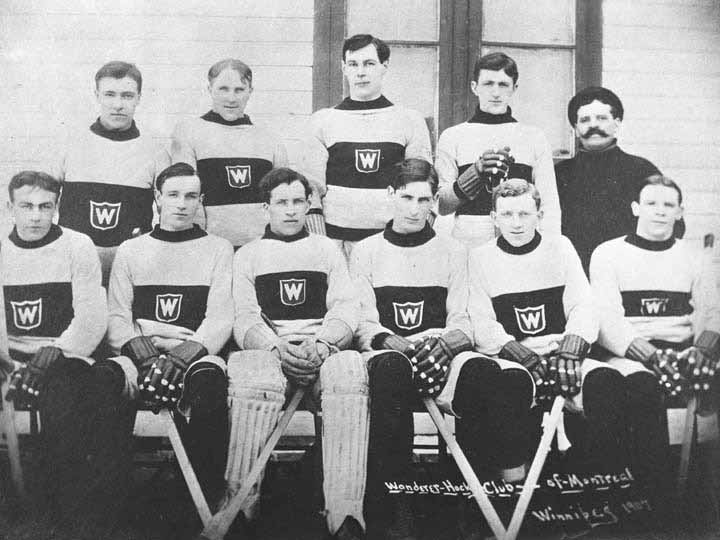
Blachford, second from left in the front row, with the 1906–07 Montreal Wanderers.

Born in Montreal, Quebec, Blachford played junior hockey for Montreal Mintos in 1898–99, before graduating to senior-level hockey the following season with Montreal Stirling, for which he played until 1902. He joined the Montreal Hockey Club's intermediate squad, and played one game with the Montreal HC senior team (also known as the "Little Men of Iron") in the regular season, and two games of Stanley Cup challenge play, helping to defeat the Winnipeg Victorias. He left Montreal HC with several other Montreal HC players in the off-season to join the new Montreal Wanderers for whom he played continuously until the end of the 1907–08 season. He was captain of the 1906 through 1908 squads.

In the 1906 season, he was sidelined for most of the season with blood poisoning. In 1907 he was the victim of a blow to the head from Charlie Spittal of the Ottawa Hockey Club for which Spittal was convicted in criminal court. Blachford served as a coach for the Wanderers in 1906 and 1907 while he was recovering from his illnesses. After the 1908 season, he retired, but returned for the 1909–10 season for the Wanderers in the new National Hockey Association, helping to win another Stanley Cup title before retiring for good.

Blachford died at Lachine Hospital in Montreal, Quebec in 1965.

== Playing style ==
Outside of the rover position, the more free-roaming position in the seven man game between defence and the forward line, Blachford also played as a winger. The March 21, 1908 issue of the Ottawa Citizen, in a review of the players on the Montreal Wanderers, listed Blachford as a right winger and claimed that the late defenceman Hod Stuart, a teammate of Blachford on the 1906–07 Wanderers prior to his death in June 1907, had rated him as the best winger in the ECAHA that season. The newspaper claimed that Blachford was "easily the most finished player on the forward line" on the Montreal team, and that he was "speedy, aggressive and a beautiful stick-handler."

== Statistics ==
CAHL-I = CAHL-Intermediate

			Regular season					Playoffs
Season	Team	League	GP	G	A	Pts	PIM	GP	G	A	Pts	PIM
1902–03	Montreal AAA-2	CAHL-I	5	7	0	7	–	–	–	–	–	–
1902–03	Montreal AAA	CAHL	1	2	1	3	3	–	–	–	–	–
		Stanley Cup	–	–	–	–	–	2	0	0	0	6
1904	Montreal Wanderers	FAHL	5	4	0	4	6	–	–	–	–	–
		Stanley Cup	–	–	–	–	–	1	1	0	1	–
1904–05	Montreal Wanderers	FAHL	7	10	0	10	–	–	–	–	–	–
1906	Montreal Wanderers	ECAHA	6	5	2	7	13	–	–	–	–	–
1907	Montreal Wanderers	ECAHA	7	16	3	19	3	–	–	–	–	–
		Stanley Cup	–	–	–	–	–	3	0	0	0	3
1907–08	Montreal Wanderers	ECAHA	10	11	4	15	13	–	–	–	–	–
		Stanley Cup	–	–	–	–	–	4	5	0	5	5
1910	Montreal Wanderers	NHA	3	5	0	5	8	–	–	–	–	–
FAHL totals			12	14	0	14	6	–	–	–	–	–
ECAHA totals			23	32	9	41	29	–	–	–	–	–
Stanley Cup totals			–	–	–	–	–	10	6	0	6	14

Statistics per Society for International Hockey Research at sihrhockey.org

== Bibliography ==
- Coleman, Charles L. (1966). The Trail of the Stanley Cup, vol. 1, 1893-1926 inc. National Hockey League.
