= Alphonse Jetté =

Canadian ice hockey defenceman (1887 - 1944)

- Born: December 28, 1887 Montreal, Quebec, Canada
- Died: June 11, 1944 (aged 56) Montreal, Quebec
- Position: Defence
- Played for: Montreal Le National; Montreal Champetre; Montreal Canadiens
- Playing career: c. 1908–1915

Joseph Alphonse Oscar Jetté (December 28, 1887 – June 11, 1944) was a professional ice hockey player, playing the defence position for the Montreal Canadiens ice hockey club from 1911 to 1915. He was born in Montreal, Quebec.

== Playing career ==
Alphonse Jetté turned professional with the Montreal Le National in 1908, and played four games with the Le Nationals in 1909–10 until the Nationals' league, the CHA folded. A newspaper account relates that he played forward for the Nationals in Feb 1909. The Nationals joined the Montreal City Senior League, and Jetté played for the club in 1910–11. In 1911, he joined the Canadiens and he would be a member of the team for four seasons, ending in 1914–15.

Jetté was a member of an all-star French Canadian team that assembled to play an exhibition game against the powerful Montreal Wanderers in March 1909. Other French Canadian stars to participate in the game were Newsy Lalonde, Didier Pitre, and Jack Laviolette, all of whom would go on to play starring roles with the Montreal Canadiens in the NHA. The Wanderers won by a score of 10–9.
