= Tom Hodge (ice hockey) =

Canadian ice hockey player, coach, executive and referee

- Born: Montreal, Quebec, Canada
- Died: November 10, 1950 Montreal, Quebec, Canada
- Position: Point
- Played for: Montreal Hockey Club; Montreal Wanderers
- Playing career: 1901–1907

Thomas Gordon Hodge was a Canadian ice hockey player, coach, referee, and executive. He won two Stanley Cups as a point for the Montreal Hockey Club, then helped found the Montreal Wanderers. He left the Wanderers in 1908 and helped establish the All-Montreal Hockey Club the following year. He also spent one season (1909–10) as the head coach of the Dartmouth College men's ice hockey team.

== Hockey ==
Hodge played for the Granites of the Independent Junior League from 1895 to 1898. He played two seasons with the Montreal Hockey Club and was a member of the team when they won Stanley Cup in 1902 and 1903.

On December 3, 1903, Hodge was elected secretary of the newly-formed Montreal Wanderers. He began officiating games that season and was referee for the 1904 Stanley Cup challenge games between the Ottawa Hockey Club and Toronto Marlboros. He resigned his position with the Wanderers in February 1905 because his impending marriage would keep him out of the city for a while. He returned to the club's executive committee on December 12, 1905, succeeding team captain Cecil Blachford. Hodge also played for and coached the Wanderers that season. He returned to the team for the 1906–07 season. Following Montreal's loss to the Kenora Thistles in a Stanley Cup challenge game on January 21, 1907, Hodge allegedly punched referee Fred Chittick as Chittick was walking to a dressing room after the game. After the Wanderers won the Cup, Hodge acted as an advance agent for the team's tour of Ontario and Western Canada. In 1907, the Wanderers became a professional team, with Hodge, William Jennings, and George Gales serving as the club's financial backers. In 1908, Hodge and Roy Schooley of the Pittsburgh Bankers served as referees for the World Championship series between the two teams.

Hodge and Jennings resigned from the Wanderers in October 1908. The following year, they became executives of the newly-formed All-Montreal Hockey Club of the Canadian Hockey Association. The CHA merged into the National Hockey Association on January 15, 1910, but All-Montreal was left out of the merger because the NHA's Wanderers were already the established team representing the Anglophone fan base in Montreal. Hodge had already found a new job, as on December 27, 1909, he was chosen to coach the Dartmouth College hockey team for the 1909–10 season.

== Business career ==
In 1900, Hodge became a partner in his father's butter and cheese export business, which was renamed George Hodge & Son. In 1911, the firm merged with Gunn, Langlois & Co.'s butter and cheese export department. Hodge was also a director of the Montreal Sailor's Institute and a member of the Montreal Board of Trade and the Commercial Travellers' Association of Canada.

== Personal life and death ==
A native of Montreal, Hodge was educated in the local schools and was a member of the First Baptist Church of Montreal. On February 22, 1905, he married Elizabeth Schurman of Ottawa. During World War I, Hodge served as an officer in the Royal Canadian Army Service Corps.

Hodge died on November 10, 1950 after a brief illiness.
