= Jack Marshall (ice hockey) =

Canadian ice hockey player (1877–1965)

- Hockey Hall of Fame, 1965
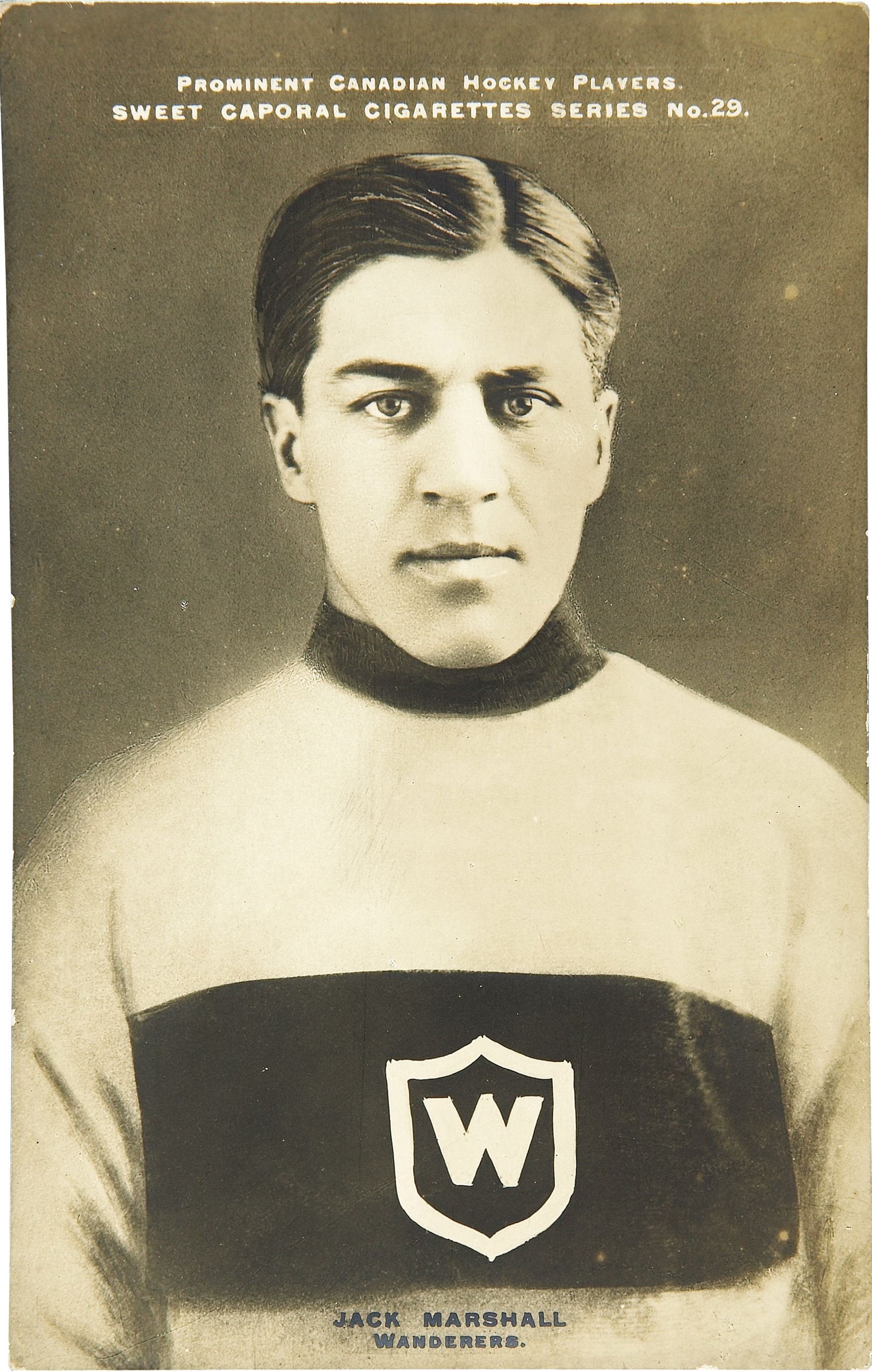
- Born: March 14, 1877 Saint-Vallier, Quebec, Canada
- Died: August 7, 1965 (aged 88) Montreal, Quebec, Canada
- Height: 5 ft 9 in (175 cm)
- Weight: 160 lb (73 kg; 11 st 6 lb)
- Position: Centre/Defence
- Shot: Right
- Played for: Montreal Wanderers; Toronto Blueshirts; Montreal Shamrocks; Toronto Professionals; Winnipeg Victorias; Winnipeg Hockey Club
- Playing career: 1898–1917

John Calder Marshall (March 14, 1877 – August 7, 1965) was a Canadian ice hockey player. Marshall played for the Winnipeg Victorias, Montreal HC, Montreal Shamrocks, Montreal Wanderers, Toronto Pros and Toronto Blueshirts. Marshall was a member of six Stanley Cup championship teams for four clubs. He won his first Stanley Cup in 1901 with Winnipeg Victorias. He then joined the Montreal HC and won two more Cups in 1902 and 1903. He also won the Stanley Cup with Montreal Wanderers in 1907 and 1910. Marshall won his sixth and final Cup as a player-manager with the Toronto Blueshirts in 1914.

Marshall was the first player to win six Stanley Cup titles. He was also the first player to win the Stanley Cup while playing for four clubs. His teammate on the 1914 Stanley Cup winning Toronto Blueshirts, goalie Hap Holmes, tied the record in 1925 while backstopping the Victoria Cougars to a Stanley Cup victory. Marshall was inducted into the Hockey Hall of Fame in 1965.

== Playing career ==
Born in Saint-Vallier, Quebec, south-east of Quebec City, Marshall moved to Montreal and played high school hockey for Pointe-Saint-Charles, starting in 1894. In 1898, he made the jump to senior level play when he moved out west and started play with the Winnipeg Hockey Club intermediates, and later with the Winnipeg Victorias. He played with the Victorias until 1901, winning the Stanley Cup in a challenge with the Montreal Shamrocks.

After the season, he moved back home and joined the Montreal Hockey Club. As one of the "Little Men of Iron", the club won the Stanley Cup in 1902 and 1903. Along with several other players of the club, he left in 1903 to form the new Montreal Wanderers. He played two seasons with the Wanderers before he moved to Toronto. In 1905–06, he played with the new Toronto Professionals in exhibition play. In 1906, he returned to Montreal, and he played for the Montreal Montagnards in 1907, joining the Wanderers after the Montagnards disbanded. The Wanderers won the ECAHA title that season and successfully defended their Stanley Cup championship of 1906 in challenges.

However, Marshall did not stay with the club beyond that season. He moved to the Montreal Shamrocks and played two seasons for the Shamrocks before returning to the Wanderers for the 1910 NHA season. He helped the Wanderers to another Stanley Cup win that season, the club's last in its history. He stayed with the organization until 1912, when he returned to Toronto to join the new Toronto Hockey Club team. After Bruce Ridpath retired as manager in 1913, Marshall took on the responsibility while continuing to play for the team. He would win another Stanley Cup with the Torontos in 1914. The following season was cut short due to appendicitis and he only played four games. In all, he played three seasons for the Torontos before he returned to the Wanderers in 1915 for two seasons, before retiring from hockey in 1917.

Marshall died in Montreal on August 7, 1965, aged 88.

== Playing style ==
Jack Marshall was a strong all-round player, and over the course of his career he tried out almost every position the seven-man game had to offer. During his junior years in Pointe-Saint-Charles in Montreal, beginning in 1894, he started out as a goaltender. Although he was a right-handed shot he would later play on the left wing with the Winnipeg Victorias in the Manitoba Hockey Association, because the team lacked adequate enough left-handed options. With the Montreal Wanderers he first played as a centre forward, and in the second half of his career as a defenceman. He also played occasionally at right wing and as a rover.

In the January 21, 1901 issue of the Winnipeg Tribune Marshall was described as "not a big man physically" but "solidly built, tough and enduring." The newspaper also remarked that he played "a neat speedy and cool-headed game, very free from fouls or off-sides" and that he "is an excellent shot on goal and can supply the place of any man on the forward line who may get hurt."

Outside of hockey Marshall was also prominent in basketball, and he also played soccer and rugby football.

== Career statistics ==
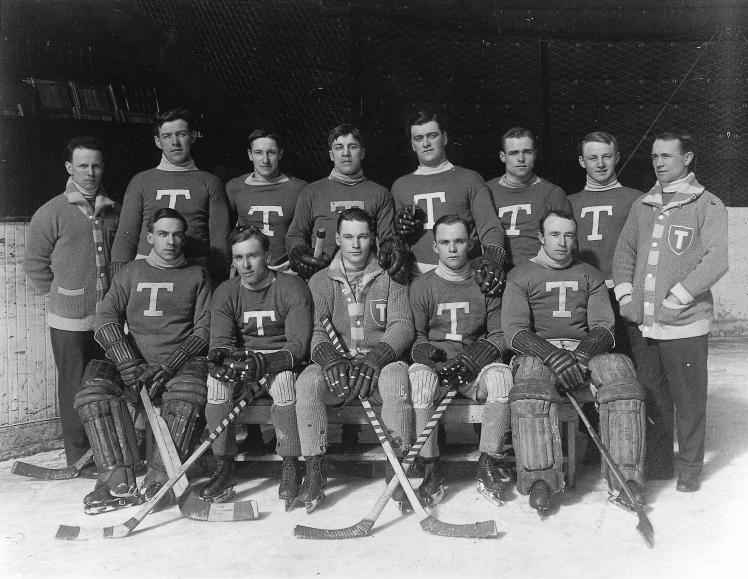
Jack Marshall, fourth from left in the back row, with the 1913–14 Toronto Blueshirts.

			Regular season					Playoffs
Season	Team	League	GP	G	A	Pts	PIM	GP	G	A	Pts	PIM
1899–1900	Winnipeg Hockey Club	MHA Int	—	—	—	—	—	—	—	—	—	—
1900–01	Winnipeg Victorias	MHA	—	—	—	—	—	—	—	—	—	—
1900–01	Winnipeg Victorias	St-Cup	—	—	—	—	—	2	0	0	0	—
1901–02	Montreal HC	CAHL	8	11	0	11	8	—	—	—	—	—
1901–02	Montreal HC	St-Cup	—	—	—	—	—	3	2	0	2	8
1902–03	Montreal HC	CAHL	2	8	0	8	3	—	—	—	—	—
1902–03	Montreal HC	St-Cup	—	—	—	—	—	4	7	0	7	2
1903–04	Montreal Wanderers	FAHL	4	11	0	11	6	—	—	—	—	—
1903–04	Montreal Wanderers	St-Cup	—	—	—	—	—	1	1	0	1	0
1904–05	Montreal Wanderers	FAHL	8	17	0	17	9	—	—	—	—	—
1906–07	Montreal Montagnards	FAHL	3	6	0	6	0	—	—	—	—	—
1906–07	Montreal Wanderers	ECAHA	3	6	0	6	0	—	—	—	—	—
1906–07	Montreal Wanderers	St-Cup	—	—	—	—	—	1	1	0	1	0
1907–08	Montreal Shamrocks	ECAHA	9	20	0	20	13	—	—	—	—	—
1908–09	Montreal Shamrocks	ECHA	12	10	0	10	14	—	—	—	—	—
1909–10	Montreal Wanderers	NHA	12	2	0	2	8	—	—	—	—	—
1909–10	Montreal Wanderers	St-Cup	—	—	—	—	—	1	0	0	0	0
1910–11	Montreal Wanderers	NHA	5	1	0	1	2	—	—	—	—	—
1911–12	Montreal Wanderers	NHA	3	0	0	0	0	—	—	—	—	—
1912–13	Toronto Blueshirts	NHA	15	3	0	3	8	—	—	—	—	—
1913–14	Toronto Blueshirts	NHA	20	3	3	6	16	2	0	0	0	0
1913–14	Toronto Blueshirts	St-Cup	—	—	—	—	—	3	1	0	1	2
1914–15	Toronto Blueshirts	NHA	4	0	1	1	8	—	—	—	—	—
1915–16	Montreal Wanderers	NHA	15	1	0	1	2	—	—	—	—	—
1916–17	Montreal Wanderers	NHA	8	0	0	0	3	—	—	—	—	—
ECAHA/ECHA totals			24	36	0	36	27	—	—	—	—	—
NHA totals			80	10	4	14	47	2	0	0	0	0
St-Cup totals			—	—	—	—	—	15	12	0	12	—

== Awards and achievements ==
- Scored six goals in a game versus Ottawa on January 20, 1904
- Scored five goals in a game twice, both versus Montreal, on December 29, 1908, and February 8, 1909.
- Stanley Cup Championships (1901, 1902, 1903, 1907, 1910, & 1914)
- Inducted into the Hockey Hall of Fame in 1965
