= Jimmy Gardner (ice hockey) =

Canadian ice hockey player and coach (1881–1940)

- Hockey Hall of Fame, 1962
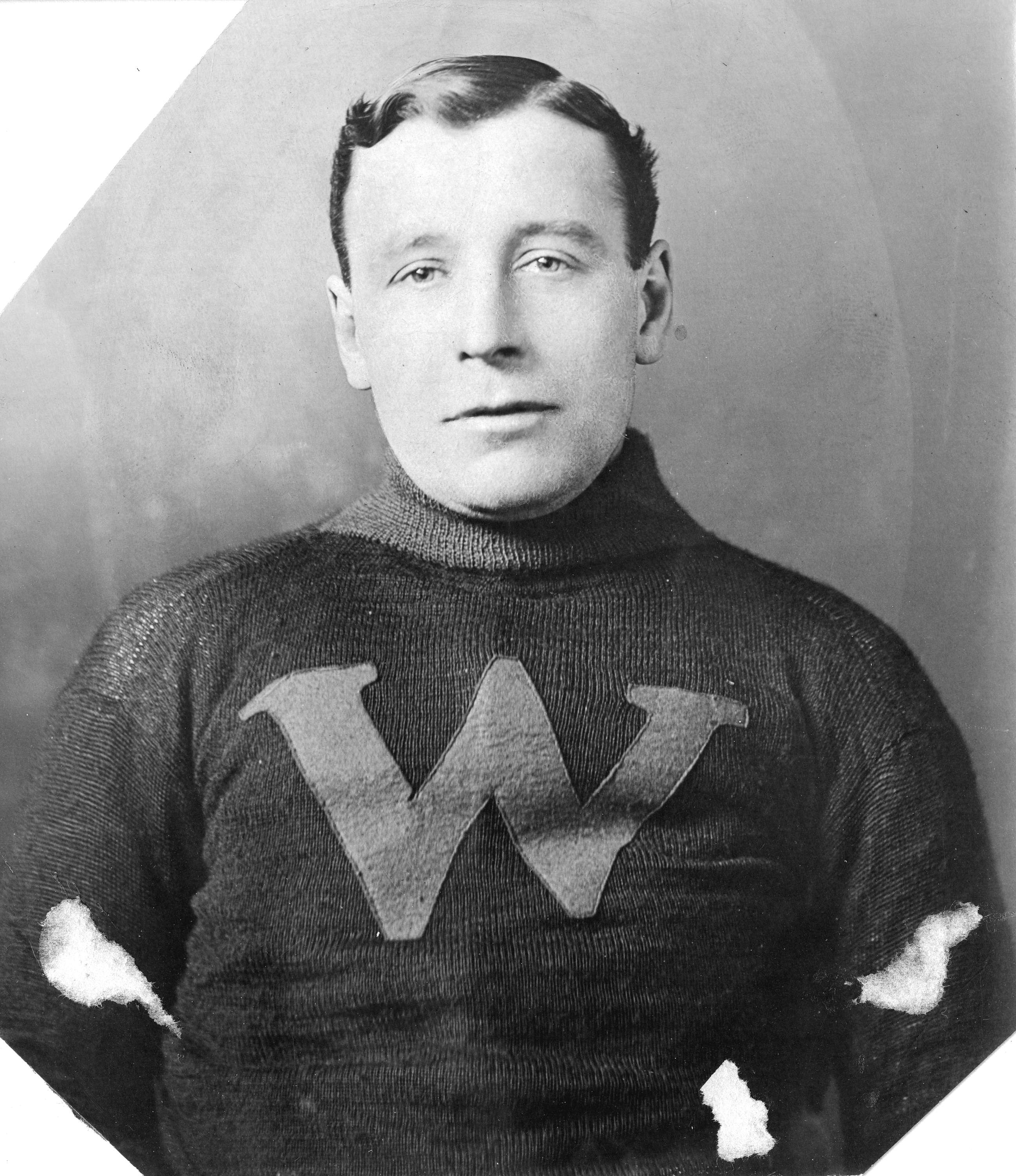
- Gardner with the New Westminster Royals in 1912
- Born: May 21, 1881 Montreal, Quebec, Canada
- Died: November 6, 1940 (aged 59) Montreal, Quebec, Canada
- Height: 5 ft 9 in (175 cm)
- Weight: 180 lb (82 kg; 12 st 12 lb)
- Position: Left wing
- Shot: Left
- Played for: Pittsburgh Professionals; Montreal Wanderers; Montreal Shamrocks; Calumet Miners; New Westminster Royals; Montreal Canadiens
- Playing career: 1899–1915

James Henry Gardner (May 21, 1881 – November 6, 1940) was a Canadian ice hockey player and coach. Gardner started his career as professionalism was just starting in ice hockey. He won championships with both amateur and professional teams. After his hockey career ended, Gardner coached professionally, most notably with the Montreal Canadiens of the National Hockey Association (NHA). Gardner helped found the NHA, the predecessor of today's National Hockey League, and the Canadiens, including suggesting the team name.

== Hockey career ==
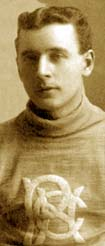
Gardner in 1907 with the Pittsburgh Pros.

Gardner's playing career started with Montreal Hockey Club amateur men's team of the Canadian Amateur Hockey League in 1900, where he played until 1903, winning the Stanley Cup twice, in 1902 and 1903 as one of the 'Little Men of Iron'. In 1903, the players of the Montreal Hockey Club left to form the new Montreal Wanderers of the Federal Amateur Hockey League (FAHL).

After one season with the Wanderers, Gardner then turned professional, playing two years for US teams the Calumet Miners and the Pittsburgh Professionals before returning to Canada and the Montreal Shamrocks. He would return to the Wanderers in 1908 and play for the club until 1911, winning the Cup in 1908 and 1910. He joined the new PCHA and played for New Westminster for two seasons, before returning to Montreal to play for the Montreal Canadiens for two seasons before retiring as a player.

Gardner then coached the Canadiens for two seasons and in later years coached the Hamilton Tigers, Providence Reds, and teams in the Western Canada Hockey League and Quebec Hockey League.

Gardner is credited with helping to found the Montreal Canadiens in 1909, including its name. As an official of the Wanderers, he met with Ambrose O'Brien during the hockey meetings of December 1909, when the Wanderers and O'Brien's teams were left out of a new professional league. Gardner and O'Brien together worked on the idea of the new National Hockey Association, and the idea of a new francophone team for Montreal, to be named "Les Canadiens". The club would be a natural rival for the anglophone Wanderers. O'Brien, whose family controlled railway and mining business, underwrote both the new league and the Canadiens franchise. A month later, the rival league folded and O'Brien's teams absorbed some of the rival teams. O'Brien would sell the Canadiens one year later to George Kennedy, who owned Club Athletique Canadien.

Gardner died in Montreal on November 6, 1940, after a lengthy illness.

He was inducted posthumously into the Hockey Hall of Fame in 1963.

== Career statistics ==
=== Player statistics ===
			Regular season					Playoffs
Season	Team	League	GP	G	A	Pts	PIM	GP	G	A	Pts	PIM
1899–1900	Montreal AAA-2	CAIHL	4	8	0	8	—	1	1	0	1	—
1900–01	Montreal AAA-2	CAIHL	6	10	0	10	—	—	—	—	—	—
1900–01	Montreal AAA	CAHL	1	0	0	0	0	—	—	—	—	—
1901–02	Montreal AAA-2	CAIHL	1	5	0	5	3	—	—	—	—	—
1901–02	Montreal AAA	CAHL	8	1	0	1	16	—	—	—	—	—
1901–02	Montreal AAA	St-Cup	—	—	—	—	—	3	0	0	0	12
1902–03	Montreal AAA	CAHL	3	3	0	3	9	—	—	—	—	—
1902–03	Montreal AAA	St-Cup	—	—	—	—	—	2	1	0	1	6
1903–04	Montreal Wanderers	FAHL	6	5	0	5	12	1	1	—	—	—
1903–04	Montreal Wanderers	St-Cup	—	—	—	—	—	1	1	0	1	0
1904–05	Calumet Miners	IHL	23	16	0	16	33	—	—	—	—	—
1905–06	Calumet Miners	IHL	19	3	0	3	30	—	—	—	—	—
1906–07	Pittsburgh Professionals	IHL	20	10	8	18	61	—	—	—	—	—
1907–08	Montreal Shamrocks	ECAHA	10	7	0	7	42	—	—	—	—	—
1908–09	Montreal Wanderers	ECHA	12	11	0	11	61	—	—	—	—	—
1908–09	Montreal Wanderers	St-Cup	—	—	—	—	—	2	0	0	0	13
1909–10	Montreal Wanderers	NHA	12	10	0	10	58	1	3	0	3	9
1909–10	Montreal Wanderers	St-Cup	—	—	—	—	—	1	0	0	0	6
1910–11	Montreal Wanderers	NHA	16	5	0	5	35	—	—	—	—	—
1911–12	New Westminster Royals	PCHA	15	8	0	8	49	—	—	—	—	—
1912–13	New Westminster Royals	PCHA	13	3	4	7	21	—	—	—	—	—
1913–14	Montreal Canadiens	NHA	15	10	9	19	12	—	—	—	—	—
1914–15	Montreal Canadiens	NHA	2	0	0	0	0	—	—	—	—	—
CAHL totals			12	4	0	4	25	—	—	—	—	—
IHL totals			62	29	8	37	124	—	—	—	—	—
NHA totals			45	25	9	34	105	1	3	0	3	9
PCHA totals			28	11	4	15	70	—	—	—	—	—
St-Cup totals			—	—	—	—	—	9	2	0	2	37

=== Coaching record ===
Season	Team	League	Regular season						Playoffs
Season	Team	League	GP	W	L	T	Pts	Result	Result
1910–11	Montreal Wanderers	NHA	16	7	9	0	14	4th	–
1912	New Westminster Royals	PCHA	15	9	6	0	18	1st	–
1912–13	New Westminster Royals	PCHA	13	4	9	0	8	3rd	–
1913–14	Montreal Canadiens	NHA	20	13	7	0	26	2nd	Lost in league playoffs against Toronto Blueshirts
1914–15	Montreal Canadiens	NHA	20	6	14	0	12	6th	–
1924–25	Hamilton Tigers	NHL	30	19	10	1	39	1st	No playoffs because of Hamilton Tigers player strike
NHA totals			56	26	30	0	52		
PCHA totals			28	13	15	0	26		

=== College ===
Record table
Season	Team	Overall	Conference	Standing	Postseason
Brown Bears Independent (1926–1927)
1926–27	Brown	4–4–0			
Brown:		4–4–0			
Total:		4–4–0			
National champion Postseason invitational champion Conference regular season champion Conference regular season and conference tournament champion Division regular season champion Division regular season and conference tournament champion Conference tournament champion

Preceded by Napoléon Dorval	Head coach of the Montreal Canadiens; 1913–1915	Succeeded by Newsy Lalonde
Preceded by Newsy Lalonde	Montreal Canadiens captain 1913–15	Succeeded by Howard McNamara
Preceded by Percy LeSueur	Head coach of the Hamilton Tigers; 1924–25	Succeeded by New York Americans coaches Tommy Gorman
