= Montreal Hockey Club =

Canadian ice hockey club

- City: Montreal, Quebec, Canada
- League: AHAC, CAHL, ECAHA, IPAHU, MCHL, QAHA
- Operated: 1884 to 1932
- Home arena: Victoria Rink (1884–1925), Montreal Forum (1925–1932)
- Colours: Navy Blue

Championships
- Playoff championships: Montreal Carnival: 1885, 1887; AHAC: 1888–1894; Stanley Cup: 1893, 1894, 1902, 1903; Allan Cup: 1930

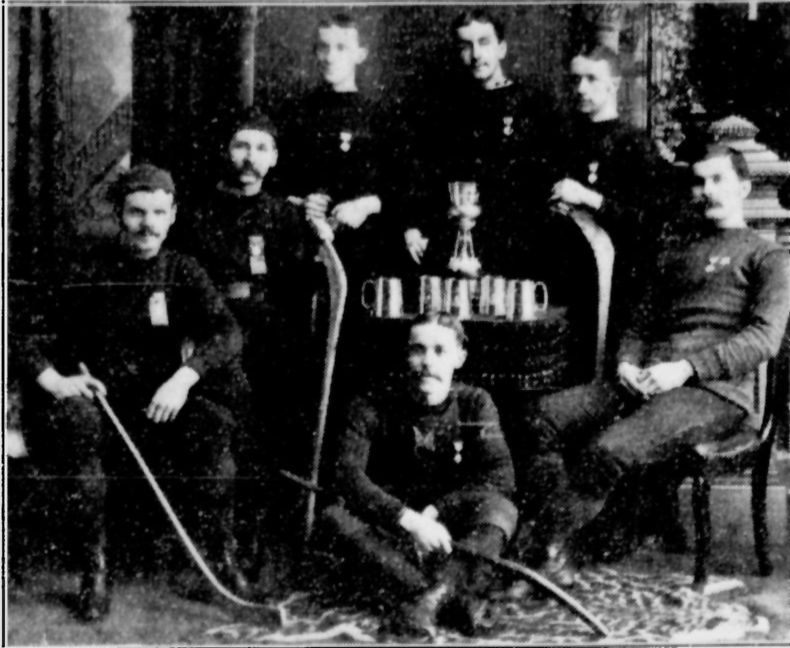
Members of the Montreal Hockey Club of 1885, posed with the Birks Trophy. From left to right: W. D. Aird, T. L. Paton, D. McIntyre, F. L. Barlow, W. C. Hodgson, F. M. Larmonth, R. F. Smith

The Montreal Hockey Club of Montreal, Quebec, Canada was a senior-level men's amateur ice hockey club, organized in 1884. They were affiliated with the Montreal Amateur Athletic Association (MAAA) and used the MAAA 'winged wheel' logo. The team was the first to win the Stanley Cup, in 1893, and subsequently refused the cup over a dispute with the Montreal Amateur Athletic Association. The club is variously known as 'Montreals', 'Montreal AAA' and 'Winged wheel' in literature.

The team played in several early ice hockey leagues, including the Amateur Hockey Association of Canada from 1886 until 1898, winning its championship seven times. The team competed in purely amateur leagues until 1906. After two seasons of playing with professionals, the club left its league, the Eastern Canada Amateur Hockey Association to continue playing in amateur competition. It would go on to win the Allan Cup in 1930, the successor of the Stanley Cup as the trophy given to Canadian amateur hockey champions. In 1932, the club would leave the MAAA association and become the Montreal Royals, eventually becoming a 'semi-professional' team in the Quebec Senior Hockey League.

== History ==
Prior to the Club's formal organization, a group of hockey enthusiasts from the 'Montreal Football Club' would play as the 'Montreal Hockey Club', as far back as 1877. The group was captained by James Creighton before he moved to Ottawa, and would play at the Victoria Skating Rink.

The Club was organized formally as an affiliate of the Montreal Amateur Athletic Association on November 28, 1884. The first president of the team was Thomas Fraser and the first team was composed of T. L. Paton in goal, Fred M. Larmonth, point; W. D. Aird, cover point; W. C. Hodgson, D. McIntyre, R. F. Smith and F. W Barlow, forwards. Several of the players were members of the Montreal Lacrosse Club. The team played its first game on January 20, 1885 against McGill University, winning 2–1.

The club would be a founding member of the Montreal-based Amateur Hockey Association of Canada (AHAC) in 1886. The team held the Amateur Hockey Association title from 1888 until 1894. After the AHAC disbanded in 1898, the club continued in the Canadian Amateur Hockey League, winning the league title in 1902.

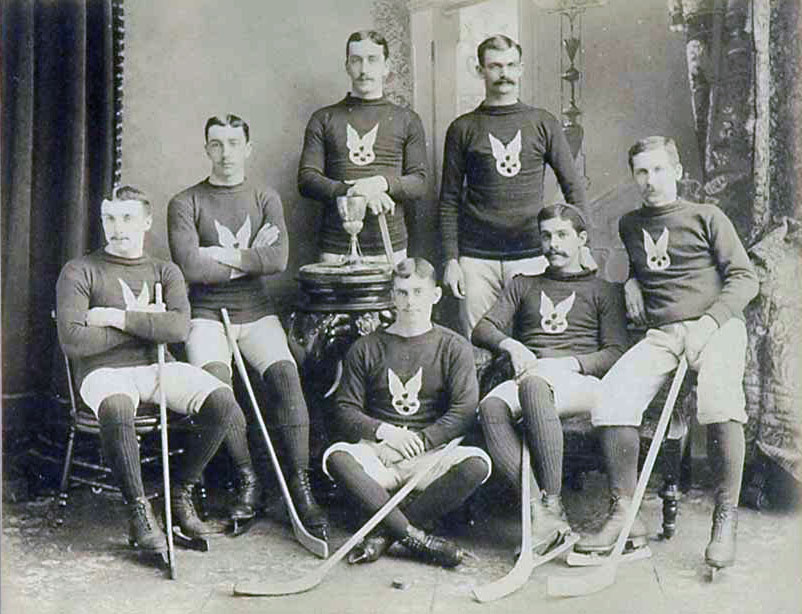
Montreal Hockey Club, 1888 Front Row: G.S. Lowe, A.A. Hodgson, J. Virtue, A. Cameron, T.L. Paton Back Row: W.C. Hodgson, J. Stewart

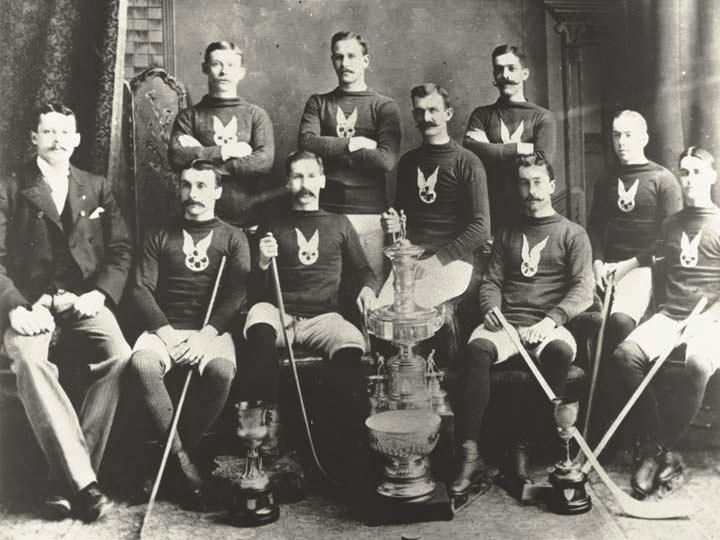
The Montreal Hockey Club in 1893 as the first Stanley Cup champions

The Club won Stanley Cup challenges in March 1894, March 1902 and February 1903. The 1902 team was known as the "Little Men of Iron" and its players became the core of the very successful Montreal Wanderers which was a professional club.

The team played two seasons with professional players, in 1907 and 1907–08, in the Eastern Canada Amateur Hockey Association, and after that no longer competed for the Stanley Cup, which became a symbol of professional hockey supremacy. The club then joined the Interprovincial Amateur Hockey Union, competing for the Allan Cup, the championship for senior amateur teams in Canada, and winning it in 1930. Between 1913 and 1924 the club played nine seasons in the Montreal City Hockey League.

On October 11, 1932, the directors of the MAAA announced the turning over of the hockey club in its entirety to E.S. Hamilton and Ogilvie at a meeting of the Province of Quebec Hockey Association. The club was to be renamed the Royal Hockey Club or Montreal Royals, independent of the association. The junior club operated by the M.A.A.A was also transferred.

== Season-by-season record ==
Year	League	GP	W	L	T	PTS	GF	GA	PIM	Finish	Playoffs
1885	independent	–	–	–	–	–	–	–	–	–	Won Montreal Winter Carnival
1886	independent	–	–	–	–	–	–	–	–	–	Won Burlington Winter Carnival
1887	AHAC	4	3	1	0	6	8	5	–	–	Won Montreal Winter Carnival
1888	AHAC	7	6	1	0	12	23	9	–	–	AHAC champions
1888–89	AHAC	5	4	1	0	8	21	7	–	–	AHAC champions
1890	AHAC	8	8	0	0	16	33	17	–	–	AHAC champions
1891	AHAC	5	5	0	0	10	18	4	–	–	AHAC champions
1892	AHAC	6	1	4	0	2	9	21	–	–	AHAC co-champions Lost to Ottawa in first challenge of season; defeated Ottawa (1–0) in final challenge to regain championship
1893	AHAC	8	7	1	0	14	38	18	–	1st	AHAC champions Awarded Stanley Cup
1894	AHAC	8	5	3	0	10	25	15	–	1st (four-way tie)	AHAC champions Won Stanley Cup; Defeated Victorias (3–2), Ottawa(3–1) in playoff.
1895	AHAC	8	4	4	0	8	33	22	–	2nd	defeated Queen's University 5–1 in Stanley Cup Challenge game. Following the game the Stanley Cup was the awarded to Montreal Victorias as 1895 AHAC Regular Season Champions. Montreal HC has never been recognized as a Stanley Cup champion in 1895.
1896	AHAC	8	2	6	0	4	24	33	–	4th	–
1897	AHAC	8	5	3	0	10	31	26	–	3rd	–
1898	AHAC	8	5	3	0	10	34	21	–	2nd	–
1899	CAHL	8	3	5	0	6	30	29	–	4th	–
1900	CAHL	8	5	3	0	10	34	36	–	2nd	–
1901	CAHL	8	3	5	1	6	28	37	–	4th	–
1902	CAHL	8	6	2	0	12	39	15	–	1st	Defeated Winnipeg Victorias 2–1 in best-of-three challenge. Won Stanley Cup
1903	CAHL	8	4	3	0	8	34	19	–	3rd	Defeated Winnipeg Victorias in best-of-three challenge 8–1, 2–2(abandoned), 2–4, 4–1 to win Stanley Cup Challenge. Lost Stanley Cup by placing third.
1904	CAHL	8	3	5	0	6	34	49	–	3rd	–
1905	CAHL	10	7	3	0	14	54	42	–	3rd	–
1906	ECAHA	10	3	7	0	6	49	63	–	5th	–
1907	ECAHA	10	3	7	–	6	58	83	–	4th
1907–08	ECAHA	10	1	9	0	2	53	205	–	6th	–
1908–09	IPAHU	6	3	3	0	6	–	–	–	3rd
1909–10	IPAHU	6	1	5	0	2	–	–	–	4th

Starting in 1908, the Montreal Hockey Club played in the Quebec Amateur Hockey Association and the Inter-provincial Amateur Hockey Union leagues.

== Notable players ==
- William Cecil "Billy" Christmas (1899–1901), inducted into Canada's Sports Hall of Fame in 2015.
- Tom Paton (1885–1893), early goaltender with the club
- James E. Norris (1898), later went on to be very successful in the grain, sports, entertainment and transportation industries, and founder of the Detroit Red Wings of the NHL, and adapted the MAAA logo for the Red Wings.
- Dickie Boon (1902), founded the Montreal Wanderers, inducted into Hockey Hall of Fame in 1952.
- Jimmy Gardner (1900–1903), Hockey Hall of Fame left winger
- Jack Marshall (1901–1903), Hockey Hall of Fame defenseman/center
- Tommy Phillips (1903), Hockey Hall of Fame left winger
- Ernie "Moose" Johnson (1903–1905), Hockey Hall of Fame defenseman
- Ernie Russell (1904–05), Hockey Hall of Fame center

== See also ==
- List of Stanley Cup champions
- Montreal Junior Hockey Club
