= List of defunct and relocated National Hockey League teams =

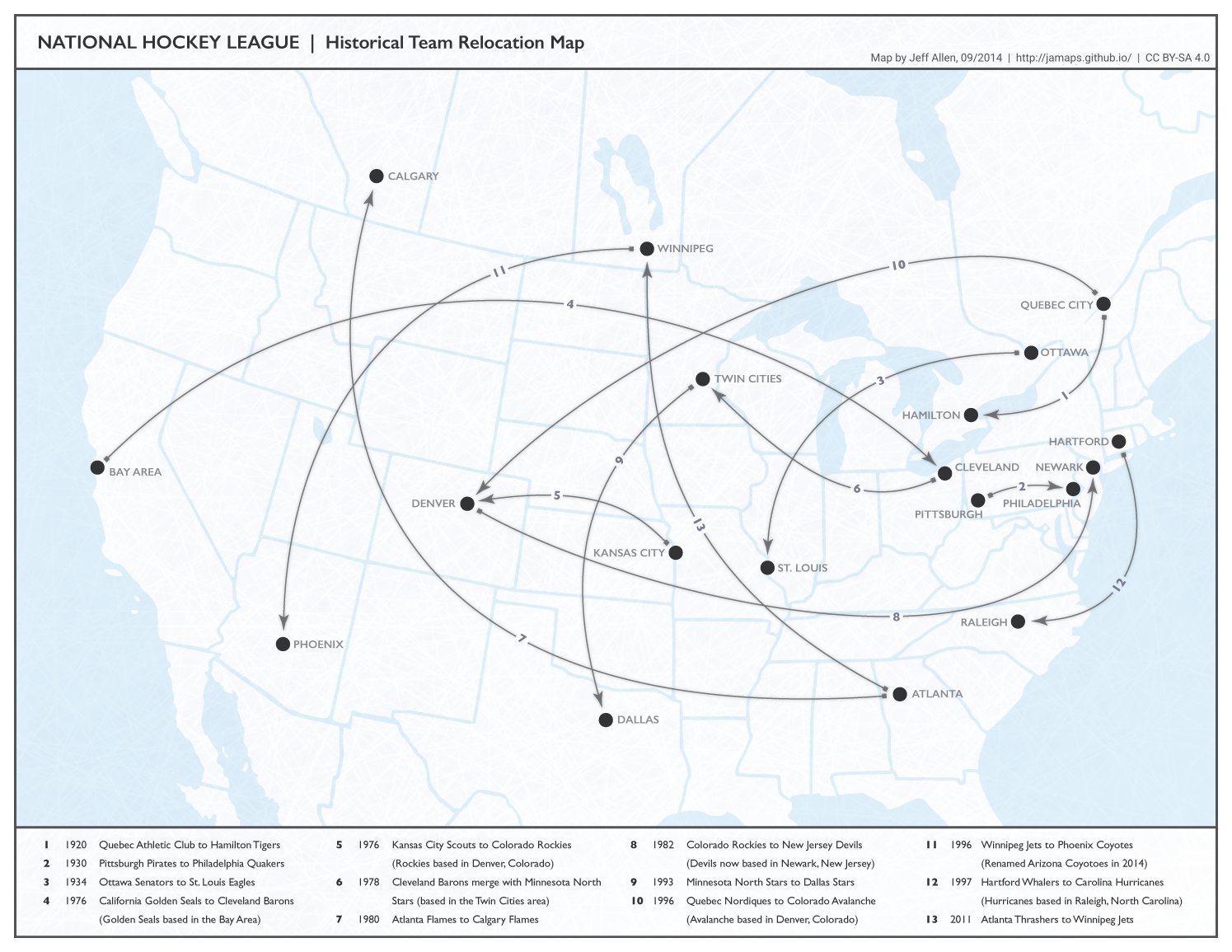
Map of relocated NHL teams before 2024

The owner of a team in the National Hockey League (NHL), a professional men's ice hockey league, may move the team more than 50 miles outside its current city only by majority approval of the NHL Board of Governors, which consists of representatives of each team's owners.

Under the constitution of the NHL, team owners are partners who each hold a franchise from the League for the operation of a hockey club in its designated city. The franchise can out-live teams located in different cities. For example, the Kansas City Scouts, Colorado Rockies, and New Jersey Devils are one franchise. A franchise's history includes the records of competition won in different cities, as differently-named teams. Naming and team logos and designs are registered with the league. One current team use the name of a previous franchise – the Ottawa Senators. This franchise does not include the history of the previous franchises, but have used the original franchises' logos and jersey designs. The league considers the history of the current Ottawa Senators to not include the original Senators. Prior to 2026, the Winnipeg Jets' franchise history included the Atlanta Thrashers' history, but not the first Winnipeg Jets (later the Arizona Coyotes). However, on September 24, 2026, the NHL decided to consolidate the original Jets' records and history with the current Jets/Thrashers records, with the Coyotes now treated as a separate franchise.

There are 19 defunct and relocated NHL teams. The Montreal Wanderers, original Ottawa Senators, and the Quebec Bulldogs had played in the NHA before joining the NHL; Quebec City joined the NHL two years later as the Athletics. The Pittsburgh Pirates played in the U.S. Amateur Hockey Association as the Pittsburgh Yellow Jackets before joining the NHL in 1925. The first NHL team to disband was the Montreal Wanderers, citing the lack of available players due to World War I. The first team to move was the Athletics, who moved to Hamilton, Ontario, to become the Hamilton Tigers. The NHL president at the time, Frank Calder, stripped the franchise from owner Mike Quinn and sold it to a Hamilton-based company. Three franchises became defunct due to the Great Depression: the Philadelphia Quakers, the St. Louis Eagles, and the Montreal Maroons. During their time in the NHL, the Senators and Maroons both won the Stanley Cup championship multiple times, with four and two respectively. The Brooklyn Americans was the last team to become defunct in the NHL. The franchise was struggling financially and, due to the lack of players because of World War II, was suspended prior to the 1942–43 season. The franchise formally ceased in 1946. The Americans' departure reduced the number of teams to six. This began what became known as the Original Six era of the NHL.

The Original Six era ended when the NHL expanded twofold in 1967. Two teams from the expansion—the California Golden Seals and the Minnesota North Stars—moved to other cities. The Golden Seals moved after nine seasons in Oakland to become the Cleveland Barons; this was the first time in four decades the NHL approved a franchise move. Two years later, after failed overtures towards merging with the Washington Capitals and the Vancouver Canucks, the Barons merged with the North Stars. The Barons are the only NHL team to merge operations with another one. The North Stars moved to Dallas in 1993 to become the Stars.

After six additional expansion teams, the merger of the Cleveland Barons with the Minnesota North Stars, and the NHL–WHA merger, the league had expanded to 21 teams by 1979. Three of the four teams from the NHL–WHA merger moved to other cities: the Quebec Nordiques, the original Winnipeg Jets, and the Hartford Whalers. The Nordiques became the Colorado Avalanche in 1995, while the hockey assets of the Winnipeg Jets became the Phoenix Coyotes in 1996 and rebranded as the Arizona Coyotes in 2014 (but then becoming defunct in 2024), with the Hartford Whalers moving to North Carolina and becoming the Carolina Hurricanes in 1997. The Winnipeg Jets identity was revived in 2011, when a Winnipeg-based company received approval from the league to purchase the struggling Atlanta Thrashers and move them to Winnipeg for the 2011–12 season.

In a unique situation in 2024, the Arizona Coyotes were deactivated and the team's players and personnel were transferred to a new expansion team in Utah. Under the original agreement, Coyotes owner Alex Meruelo retained the rights to the team name and history, as well as an option for reactivation in Arizona for five years, under the condition a new arena is completed in that time. However he ceded his rights to the franchise less than two months later. As of July 2024, the league has not yet indicated whether the Arizona franchise will now fold outright, hold the rights to the Coyotes and wait for a potential expansion team, and/or whether its history, records and/or intellectual property will be transferred to the Utah Mammoth and/or split between Utah and the current Winnipeg Jets.

Out of the seven active relocated franchises in the NHL, only the Winnipeg Jets have neither won the Stanley Cup nor advanced to the Stanley Cup Finals.

Most of the metropolitan areas that have hosted relocated or defunct teams have been given another NHL team. Montreal, Quebec City and Atlanta all have two defunct or relocated teams with the Wanderers and Maroons, the Athletics and Nordiques, and the Flames and Thrashers, respectively. Philadelphia (Philadelphia Flyers), Pittsburgh (Pittsburgh Penguins), and St. Louis (St. Louis Blues) gained teams during the 1967 expansion. After losing the Americans, two more teams have been added into the New York metropolitan area: the New York Islanders in 1972 and the New Jersey Devils in 1982. Other former host-metropolitan areas of NHL teams that have been given another team include: San Francisco Bay Area (San Jose Sharks in 1991), Ottawa (current Ottawa Senators in 1992), Denver (Colorado Avalanche in 1995), Minneapolis – St. Paul (Minnesota Wild in 2000) and Winnipeg (current Jets in 2011).

== Defunct and relocated teams ==
First	First year in the NHL
Last	Last year in the NHL
Record	Win–loss–tie–overtime record
Win%	Winning percentage
PA	NHL (1918–1926) / Stanley Cup playoff (1927–present) appearances
SC	Stanley Cup wins
*	Denotes active franchise
^	City would later receive a new franchise

Team	First	Last	Moved to	Seasons	Record	Win%	PA	SC	Reason for Move/disbandment	Reference
Montreal Wanderers^{^}	1917	1918^{[g]}	Defunct	1	1–5–0	.167	0	0	Lack of available players due to World War I and arena burned down	
Quebec Bulldogs^{^}	1919	1920	Hamilton Tigers	1	4–20–0	.167	0	0	Sold to a Hamilton-based company	
Hamilton Tigers	1920	1925	Defunct	5	47–78–1	.377	0	0	Ceased operations due to players' strike; players were bought by the New York Americans.	
Pittsburgh Pirates^{^}^{[a]}	1925	1930	Philadelphia Quakers	5	67–122–23	.370	2	0	Financial problems during the Great Depression	
Philadelphia Quakers^{^}	1930	1931	Defunct	1	4–36–4	.136	0	0	Financial problems during the Great Depression	
Ottawa Senators^{^}^{[b]}	1917	1934	St. Louis Eagles	16^{[h]}	258–221–63	.534	9	4	Financial problems during the Great Depression	
St. Louis Eagles^{^}	1934	1935	Defunct	1	11–31–6	.292	0	0	Financial problems during the Great Depression	
Montreal Maroons	1924	1938	Defunct	14	271–260–91	.509	11	2	Financial problems during the Great Depression	
Brooklyn Americans^{^}^{[c]}	1925	1942	Defunct	17	255–402–127	.406	5	0	Financial problems, plus lack of players due to World War II; formally ceased in 1946.	
California Golden Seals^{^}^{[d]}	1967	1976	Cleveland Barons	9	182–401–115	.343	2	0	In search of better financial conditions; Cleveland is the hometown of minority owner George Gund III.	
Kansas City Scouts	1974	1976	Colorado Rockies	2	27–110–23	.241	0	0	Financial problems; sold to a group of investors with the intention to move.	
Cleveland Barons	1976	1978	Defunct; Merged with Minnesota North Stars	2	47–87–26	.375	0	0	Both teams with financial problems.	
Atlanta Flames^{^}	1972	1980	Calgary Flames*	8	268–260–108	.506	6	0	Financial problems; sold to Nelson Skalbania with the intention to move to Calgary.	
Colorado Rockies^{^}^{[e]}	1976	1982	New Jersey Devils*	6	113–281–86	.325	1	0	Sold to John McMullen in search of better financial conditions; New Jersey is McMullen's home state.	
Minnesota North Stars^{^}	1967	1993	Dallas Stars*	26	758–970–334	.449	17	0	Inability to construct a new arena; moved by the owner in search of better financial conditions.	
Quebec Nordiques	1979	1995	Colorado Avalanche*	16	497–599–160	.459	9	0	Financial problems; sold to a Denver-based group.	
Winnipeg Jets^{^}^{[f]}	1979	1996	Phoenix Coyotes	17	506–660–172	.442	11	0	Inability to construct a new arena; sold to a group of investors with the intention to move in search of better financial conditions. On September 24, 2026, the NHL awarded the franchise records of the original Jets from 1972 to 1996 to the present-day Winnipeg Jets. As a result, the Coyotes franchise was retconned as an expansion franchise while the original and modern Jets, along with the Atlanta Thrashers, were constituted as one franchise.	
Hartford Whalers	1979	1997	Carolina Hurricanes*	18	534–709–177	.438	8	0	Inability to construct a new arena due to a breakdown in negotiations; moved by the owner in search of better financial conditions.	
Atlanta Thrashers^{[f]}	1999	2011	Winnipeg Jets*	11^{[i]}	342–437–45–78	.447	1	0	Financial problems; sold to True North Sports & Entertainment with the intention of moving the team to Winnipeg. The Thrashers' history, along with the original and modern Winnipeg Jets, were consolidated as one franchise by the NHL on September 24, 2026.	
Arizona Coyotes^{[j]}	1996	2024	Suspended; Hockey assets transferred to Utah Mammoth	27^{[i]}	918–934–94–191	.495	9	0	Continued financial problems stemming from the team's 2009 bankruptcy, along with the inability to construct a new arena after playing at Mullett Arena for the previous two seasons. Hockey assets sold to Ryan Smith, owner of the Utah Jazz.	

=== Notes ===
- ^{a} This team was not affiliated with the Pittsburgh Pirates of Major League Baseball (MLB).
- ^{b} This team is not affiliated with the present-day Ottawa Senators.
- ^{c} The team was formerly known as the New York Americans (1925–1941).
- ^{d} The team was formerly known as the California Seals (1967), Oakland Seals (1967–1970), and Bay Area Seals (1970).
- ^{e} This team was not affiliated with the Colorado Rockies of MLB.
- ^{f} As of 2026, the NHL considered the two incarnations of the Winnipeg Jets and Atlanta Thrashers as one continuous franchise, and the Arizona Coyotes as a separate franchise.
- ^{g} The Wanderers played four games during the 1917–18 season before becoming defunct; a further two games were defaulted before the club folded.
- ^{h} The Senators were on hiatus during the 1931–32 season due to financial problems.
- ^{i} The 2004–05 season was canceled due to the season lockout.
- ^{j} Coyotes owner Alex Meruelo retained the rights to the team name, as well as an option for reactivation in Arizona for five years, under the condition a new arena is completed in that time, however he ceded his rights to the franchise less than two months later. As of July 2024, the league has not yet indicated whether the Arizona franchise will now fold outright, hold the rights to the Coyotes and wait for a potential expansion team, and/or whether its history, records and/or intellectual property will be transferred to the Utah Mammoth and/or split between Utah and the current Winnipeg Jets.

== Map of defunct and relocated teams ==
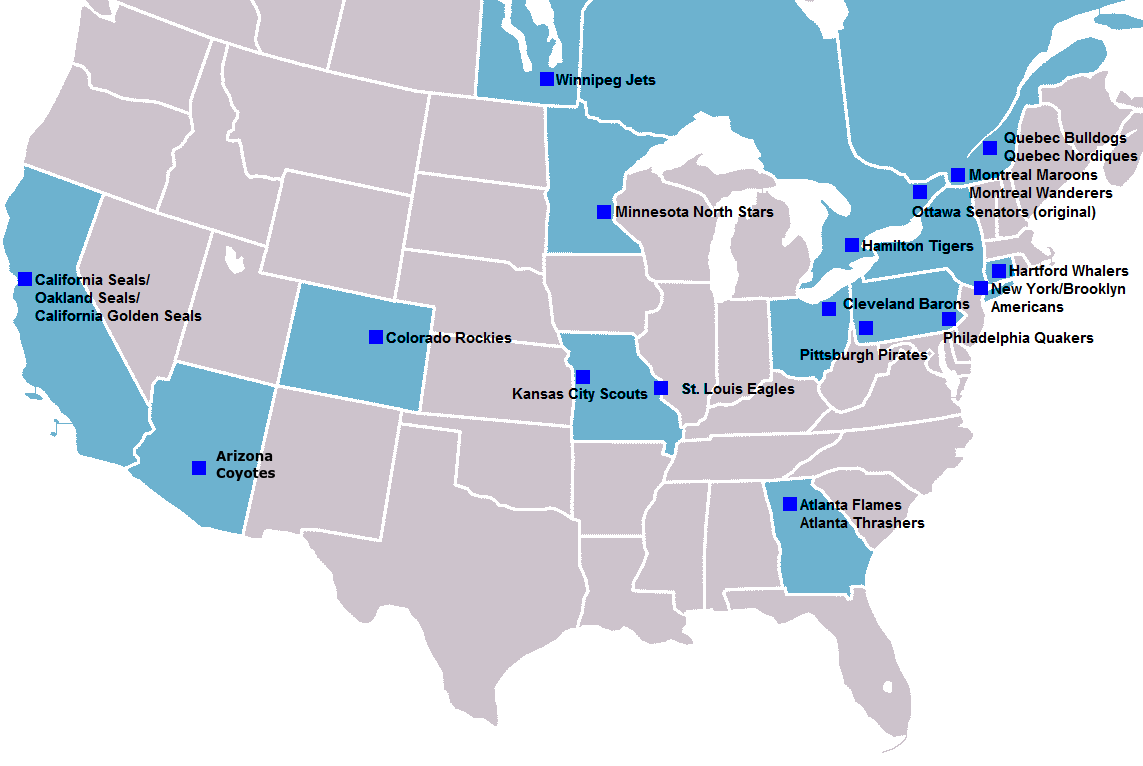
Map of the defunct and relocated NHL teams; the team names are clickable.

== See also ==
- History of the National Hockey League
- Timeline of the National Hockey League
- Potential National Hockey League expansion
