= History of the National Hockey League =

The history of the National Hockey League begins with the end of its predecessor league, the National Hockey Association (NHA), in 1917. After unsuccessfully attempting to resolve disputes with Eddie Livingstone, owner of the Toronto Blueshirts, executives of the three other NHA franchises suspended the NHA, and formed the National Hockey League (NHL), replacing the Livingstone team with a temporary team in Toronto, the Arenas. The NHL's first quarter-century saw the league compete against two rival major leagues—the Pacific Coast Hockey Association and Western Canada Hockey League—for players and the Stanley Cup. The NHL first expanded into the United States in 1924 with the founding of the Boston Bruins, and by 1926 consisted of ten teams in Ontario, Quebec, the Great Lakes region, and the Northeastern United States. At the same time, the NHL assumed the status of a major league and in 1947 completed a deal with the Stanley Cup trustees to effectively reserve the Cup competition to its teams. The NHL's media presence spread across Canada aided by Foster Hewitt's radio broadcasts, which were heard coast-to-coast starting in 1933.

The Great Depression and World War II reduced the league to six teams, later known as the "Original Six", by 1942. Maurice Richard became the first player to score 50 goals in a season in 1944–45, and ten years later, Richard was suspended for assaulting a linesman, leading to the Richard Riot. Gordie Howe made his debut in 1946, and retired 35 seasons later as the NHL's all-time leader in goals and points. Willie O'Ree was the first player of Black descent when he suited up for the Bruins in 1958. In 1959, Jacques Plante became the first goaltender to regularly use a mask for protection.

The Original Six era ended in 1967 when the NHL doubled in size by adding six new expansion teams. The six existing teams were formed into the newly created East Division, while the expansion teams were formed into the West Division. The NHL continued to expand, adding another six teams, to total 18 by 1974. This continued expansion was partially brought about by the NHL's attempts to compete with the World Hockey Association, which operated from 1972 until 1979 and sought to compete with the NHL for markets and players. Bobby Hull was the most famous player to defect to the rival league, signing a $2.75 million contract with the Winnipeg Jets. The NHL became involved in international play in the mid-1970s, starting with the Summit Series in 1972 which pitted the top Canadian players of the NHL against the top players in the Soviet Union, which was won by Canada with four wins, three losses, and a tie. Eventually, Soviet-Bloc players streamed into the NHL with the fall of the Iron Curtain in 1989.

When the WHA ceased operations in 1979, the NHL absorbed four of the league's teams, which brought the NHL to 21 teams, a figure that remained constant until the San Jose Sharks were added as an expansion franchise in 1991. Since then, the league has grown from 22 teams in 1992 to 32 today as the NHL spread its footprint across the United States. The league has withstood major labour conflicts in 1994–95 and 2004–05, the latter of which saw the entire 2004–05 NHL season canceled, the first time in North American history that a league has canceled an entire season in a labour dispute. Wayne Gretzky passed Gordie Howe as the NHL's all-time leading scorer in 1994 when he scored his 802nd career goal. Mario Lemieux overcame non-Hodgkin lymphoma to finish his NHL career with over 1,700 points and two Stanley Cup championships. Increased use of defence-focused systems helped cause scoring to fall in the late 1990s, leading some to argue that the NHL's talent pool had been diluted by 1990s expansion. In 1998, the NHL began awarding teams a single point for losing in overtime, hoping to reduce the number of tie games; after the 2004–05 lockout, it eliminated the tie altogether, introducing the shootout to ensure that each game has a winner.

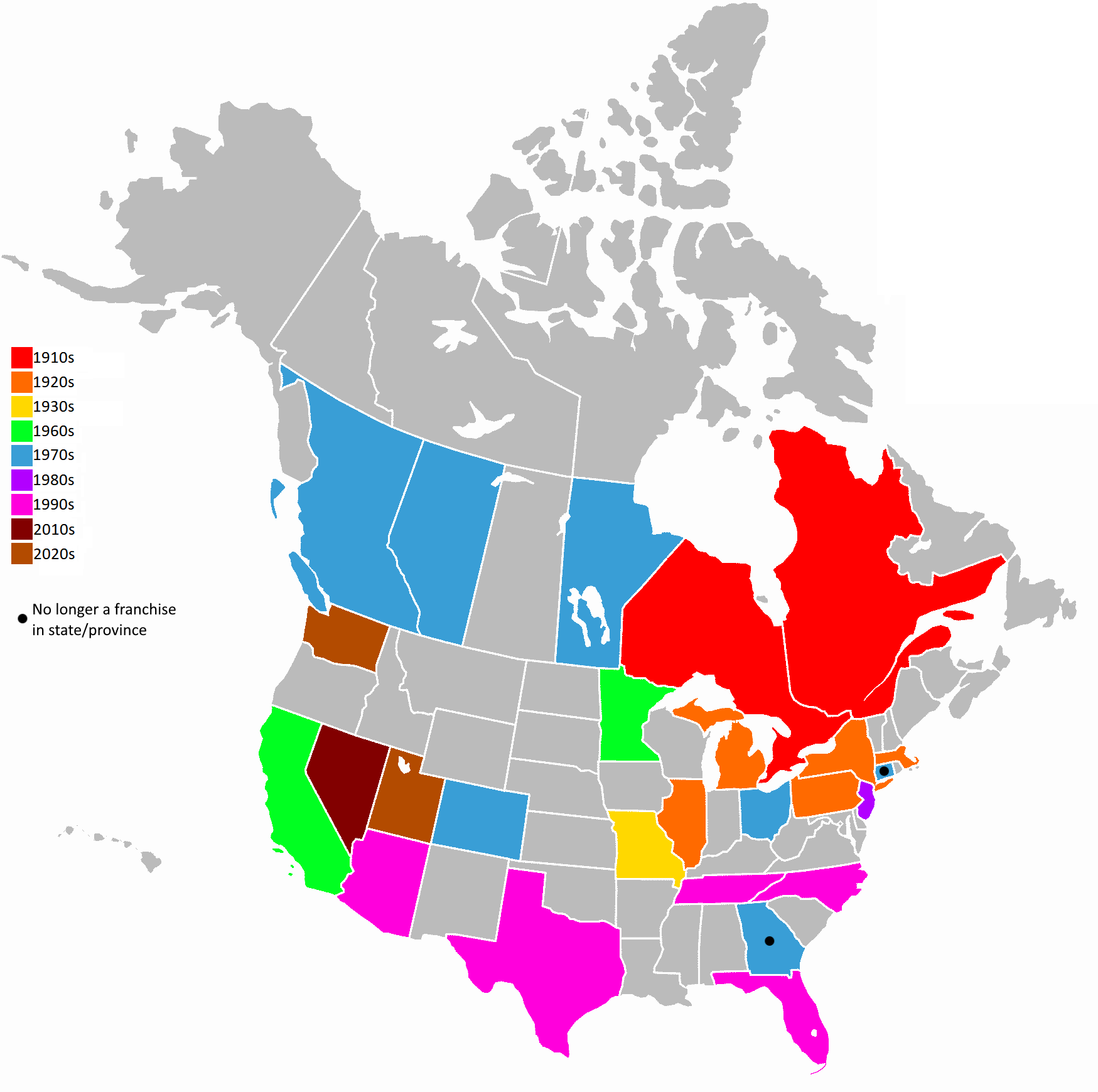
Map of Canadian provinces and U.S. states, and what decade they got their first NHL team.

== Background and founding ==
The first attempts to regulate competitive ice hockey matches came in the late 1880s. Before then, teams competed in tournaments and infrequent challenge contests that prevailed in the Canadian sports world at the time. In 1887, four clubs from Montreal formed the Amateur Hockey Association of Canada (AHAC) and developed a structured schedule. In 1892, Lord Stanley donated the Stanley Cup to be symbolic of the Canadian championship and appointed Philip Dansken Ross and Sheriff John Sweetland as its trustees. It was awarded to the AHAC champion Montreal Hockey Club and thereafter awarded to the league champions, or to any pre-approved team that won it in a challenge. In 1904, the International Hockey League (IHL), based around Lake Michigan, was created as the first fully professional league, which lasted for two seasons. In recruiting players, the IHL caused an "Athletic War" that drained amateur clubs of top players, most noticeably in the Ontario Hockey Association (OHA). In the 1905–06 season, the Eastern Canada Amateur Hockey Association (ECAHA) was formed, which mixed paid and amateur players in its rosters, which led to the demise of the IHL. Bidding wars for players led many ECAHA teams to lose money, and it eventually folded on November 25, 1909. As a result of the dissolution of the ECAHA, two leagues were formed—the Canadian Hockey Association (CHA) and the National Hockey Association (NHA). Since the NHA's owners were notable, wealthy businessmen, the CHA did not complete a season, as the NHA easily recruited the top players, and interest in the CHA teams faded. By 1914, the rival Pacific Coast Hockey Association (PCHA) league was launched and the NHA champion would play off each season against the PCHA champion for the Stanley Cup, ending the challenge era.

The National Hockey League came into existence with the suspension of the NHA in 1917. After unsuccessfully resolving disputes with Eddie Livingstone, owner of the Toronto Blueshirts, executives of the three other NHA franchises—the Montreal Canadiens, Montreal Wanderers and Ottawa Senators—suspended the NHA, and formed the NHL, replacing Livingstone's team with a temporary team in Toronto, the Arenas. While new, the NHL was a continuation of the NHA. The NHL adopted the NHA's constitution, its rules, playing with six men to a side rather than the then-traditional seven and the NHA's split-season schedule. The owners originally intended the NHL to only operate for one season. However, the NHA was suspended permanently in 1918 and ceased to be an organisation in 1920. In 1921, the NHA championship trophy O'Brien Cup was adopted as the championship trophy of the NHL.

== 1917–1942: Early years ==
=== Early years ===
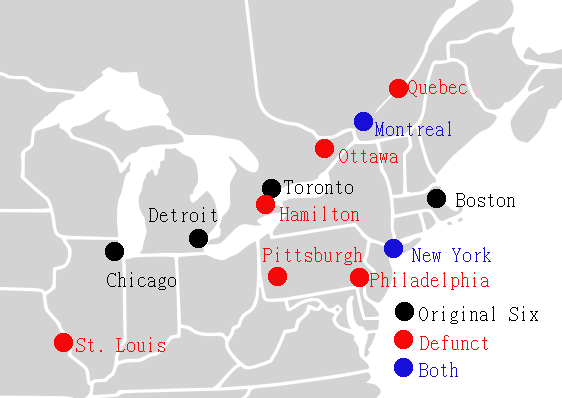
Cities that hosted NHL teams prior to the 1967 NHL expansion. The six teams that lasted past the Great Depression and World War II became known as the Original Six. Montreal and New York hosted Original Six teams and teams that folded.

One of the NHL's first superstars was the prolific goal-scorer Joe Malone, who scored 44 goals in 20 games in the NHL's first season, of which five were netted on the NHL's opening night. He also set the record for the most goals in a game that season, with seven. Six games into the season, the Montreal Wanderers were forced to permanently withdraw from the league, as a fire left them without an arena. In the 1918–19 season, the Montreal Canadiens faced the Seattle Metropolitans of the PCHA for the Stanley Cup amid the Spanish influenza pandemic. The series was called off after five games when numerous players became ill; one, Joe Hall of the Canadiens, died a few weeks later.

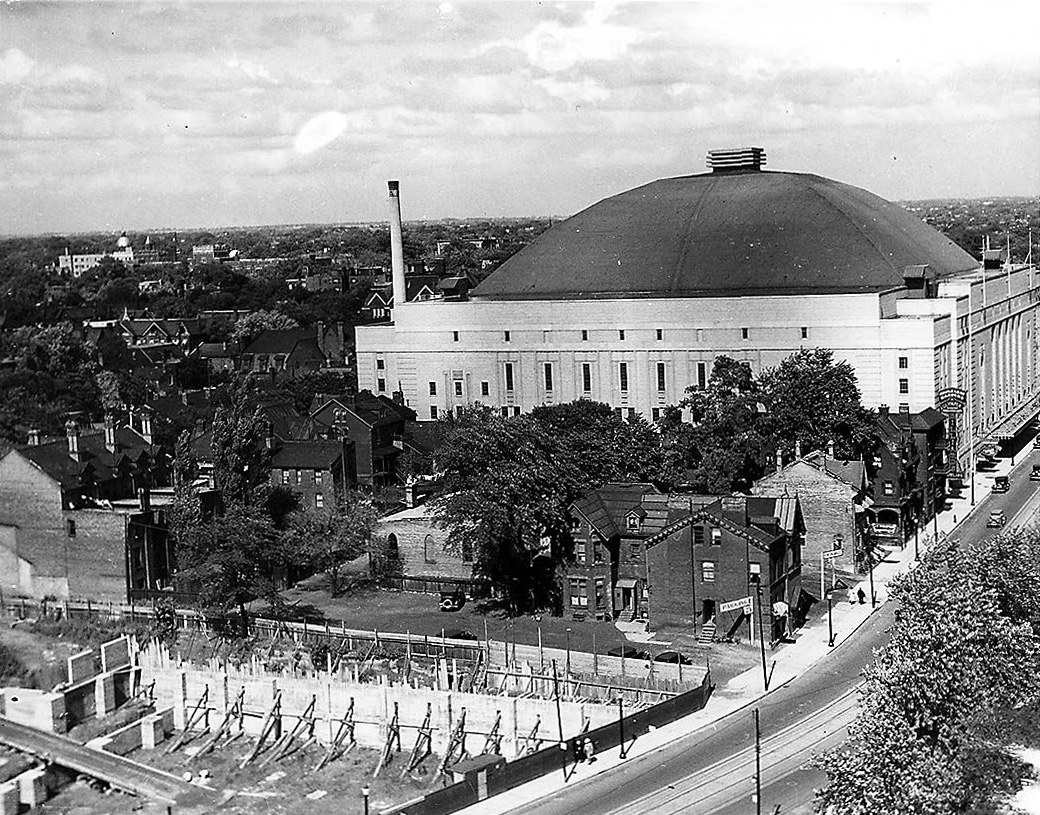
Maple Leaf Gardens in 1934

During the early 1920s, the NHL faced competition for players from two other major leagues: the PCHA and the Western Canada Hockey League (WCHL). As a result, ice hockey players were among the best paid athletes in North America. By the mid-1920s, the NHL emerged as the sole major league in North America; the PCHA and WCHL merged in 1924, only to disband two years later. The Victoria Cougars are the last non-NHL team to win the Stanley Cup, having defeated the Canadiens in 1925, and lost to the Montreal Maroons in 1926, respectively. The NHL continued to expand, adding the Maroons and its first American team, the Boston Bruins in 1924, getting up to 10 teams by 1926. Defence dominated the NHL, and in the 1928–29 season, Canadiens goaltender George Hainsworth set what remains a league record with 22 shutouts in 44 games. In response, the NHL began to allow forward passing in the offensive zone, which caused the offense to increase by approximately 2.5 times; to stem the tide, the NHL introduced the offside rule, which prevents offensive players from entering the opponent's zone before the puck crosses the "blue line".

Livingstone continued to press claims in court throughout the 1920s, going as far as the Judicial Committee of the Privy Council in London, England. In early 1927, the Toronto franchise was sold to Conn Smythe, who renamed it to the Maple Leafs, and successfully promised to win the Stanley Cup in five years. He built the Maple Leaf Gardens, which included radio broadcaster Foster Hewitt's famous broadcast booth, affectionately referred to as a "gondola". On December 13, 1933, Eddie Shore charged Ace Bailey causing a severe skull fracture, following what Shore thought was a check from Bailey, but was actually made by King Clancy. Despite the grim prognosis (newspapers printed his obituary), Bailey survived, but did not play another game. The Maple Leafs hosted the Ace Bailey All-Star Benefit Game, which raised over $20,000 for Bailey and his family.

=== Great Depression ===
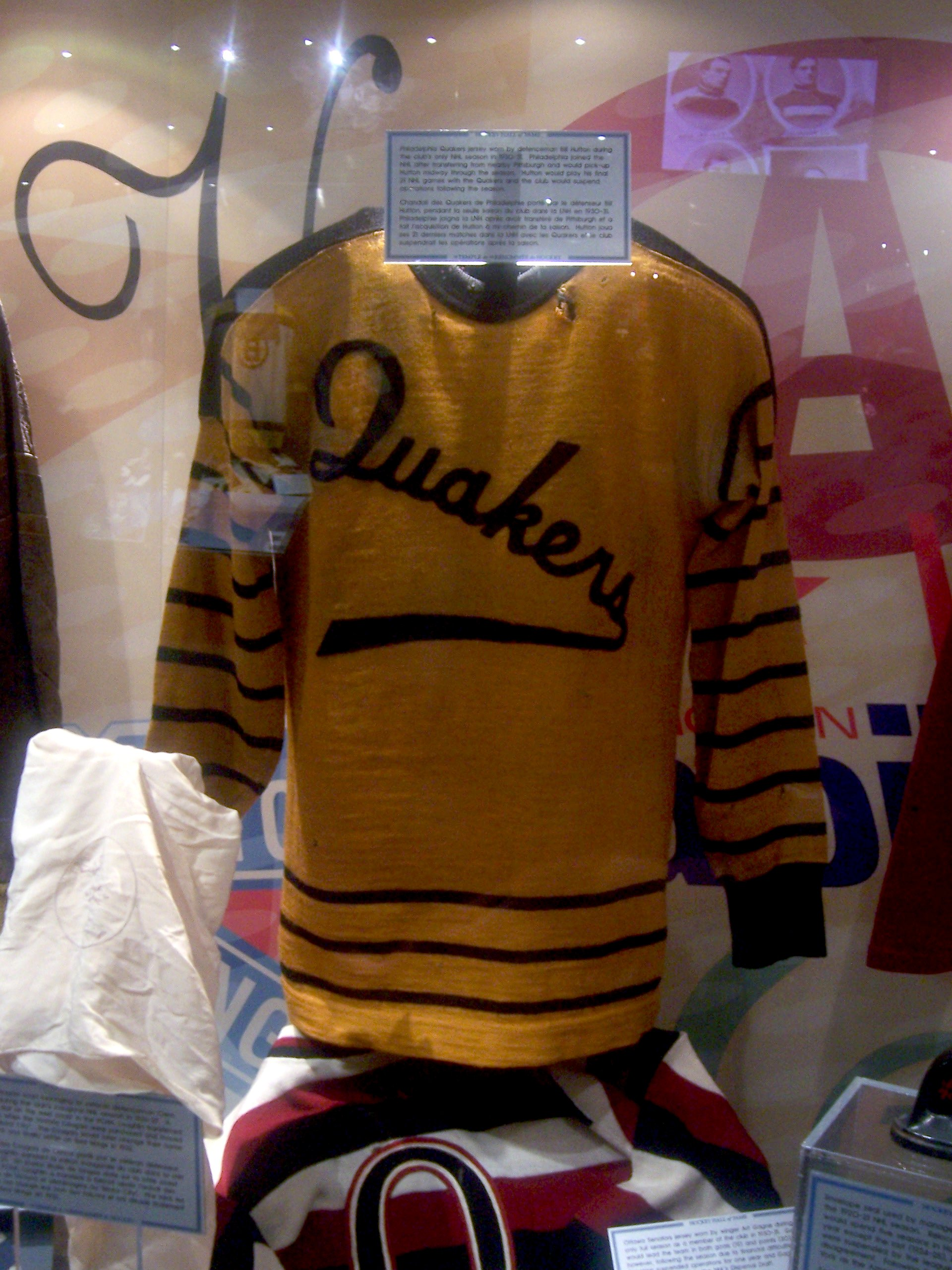
The sweater of the Philadelphia Quakers, in 1931–32; the Quakers were one of four franchises to fail between 1931 and 1942.

While Conn Smythe was able to successfully build a new arena, numerous other teams experienced financial difficulties. With the folding of the Philadelphia Quakers (originally the Pittsburgh Pirates) and the St. Louis Eagles (originally the Ottawa Senators), the NHL was reduced to eight teams starting in the 1935–36 season. The Montreal Canadiens narrowly escaped a move to Cleveland, Ohio, before a syndicate of Montreal businessmen bought the team. Montreal's financial troubles forced them to sell popular player Howie Morenz. When Morenz scored against the Canadiens on the last day of the 1935 season, Montreal fans voiced their opinion, giving him a standing ovation. Morenz was eventually re-acquired by Montreal, and on January 28, 1937, Morenz's skate became caught in the ice during a play. He suffered a broken leg in four places, and died on March 8 of a coronary embolism; 50,000 people filed past Morenz's casket at centre ice of the Montreal Forum to pay their last respects. A benefit game held in November 1937 raised $20,000 for Morenz's family as the NHL All-Stars defeated the Montreal Canadiens 6–5.

In the mid-1930s, Chicago Black Hawks owner and staunch American nationalist Frederic McLaughlin commanded his general manager to compile a team of only American players; at the time, Taffy Abel was the only American-born player who was a regular player in the league. With eight out of 14 players Americans, the Black Hawks won only 14 of 48 games. In the playoffs, however, the Hawks upset the Canadiens, New York Americans, and the Maple Leafs to become the only team in NHL history to win the Stanley Cup despite a losing regular-season record. In the 1942 Stanley Cup Final, the heavily favoured Toronto Maple Leafs were facing an upset, having fallen 3–0 in the seven-game series to the fifth-place Detroit Red Wings. Toronto rebounded, and won the next four games to capture the Stanley Cup, becoming the first of four teams in the NHL to come back from a 3–0 series deficit and the only team to accomplish that in the Stanley Cup Final.

Prior to the 1938–39 season, the Montreal Maroons folded due to financial difficulties, while the New York Americans suffered a similar fate prior to the 1942–43 season. With the league reduced to six teams, the "Original Six" era began. The league was nearly reduced to five teams before the following season, as World War II had ravaged the rosters of many teams to such an extent that teams battled each other for players. With only five returning players from the previous season, New York Rangers general manager Lester Patrick suggested suspending his team's play for the duration of the war but was persuaded otherwise.

== 1942–1967: Original Six era ==
=== Post-war period ===
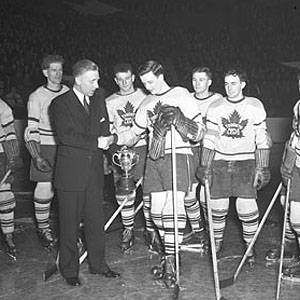
Red Dutton briefly served as NHL president between 1943 and 1946.

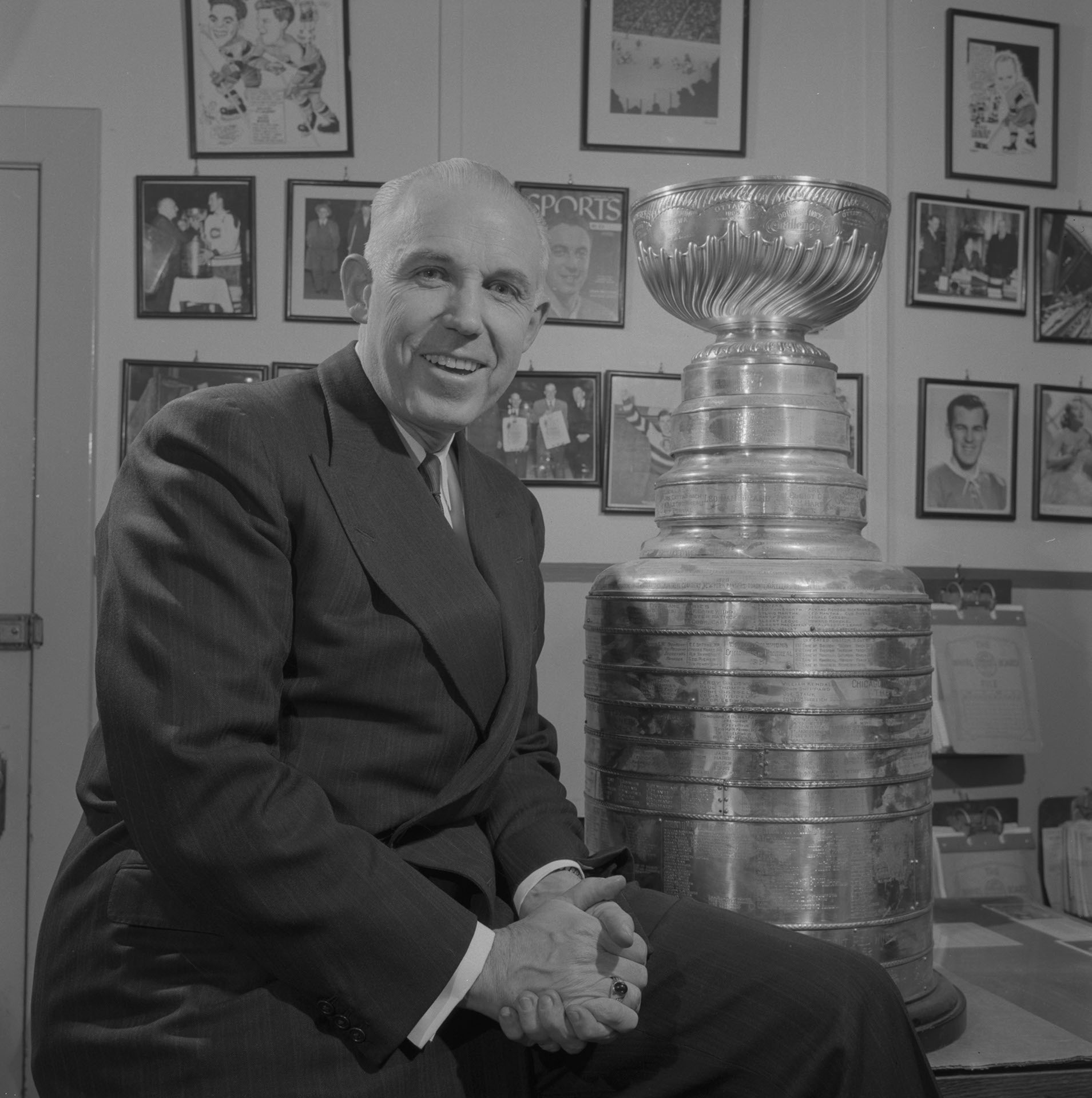
Clarence Campbell served as the NHL's third President from 1946 until his retirement in 1977.

In February 1943, league President Frank Calder collapsed during a meeting, dying shortly after. Red Dutton agreed to take over as president after receiving assurances from the league that the Brooklyn franchise he had operated would resume play after the war. When the other team owners reneged on this promise in 1946, Dutton resigned as league president. With Dutton's recommendation, Clarence Campbell was named president of the NHL in 1946. He remained in that role until his retirement in 1977. For the first 21 years of his presidency, the same six teams (located in Boston, Chicago, Detroit, Montreal, New York, and Toronto) competed for the Stanley Cup and that period has been called the "golden age of hockey". The NHL featured increasingly intense rivalries coupled with rule innovations that opened up the game. The first official All-Star Game took place at Maple Leaf Gardens in Toronto on October 13, 1947, to raise money for the newly created NHL Pension Society. The NHL All-Stars defeated the Toronto Maple Leafs 4–3 and raised C$25,000 for the pension fund.

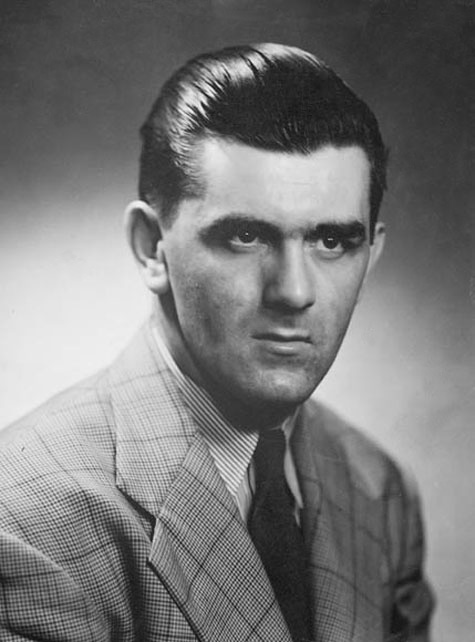
Maurice "Rocket" Richard, the first player to score 50 goals in 50 games, retired as the NHL's all-time scoring leader.

The 1940s Canadiens were led by the "Punch line" of Elmer Lach, Toe Blake and Maurice "Rocket" Richard. In 1944–45, Lach, Richard and Blake finished first, second and third in the NHL's scoring race with 80, 73 and 67 points respectively. It was Richard who became the focus of the media and fans as he attempted to score 50 goals in a 50-game season, a feat no other player had accomplished in league history. Richard scored his 50th goal in Boston at 17:45 of the third period of Montreal's final game of the season. On March 13, 1948, Larry Kwong, known as the "China Clipper", became the first known player of Asian descent in the NHL, suiting up for the New York Rangers against the Montreal Canadiens at the Montreal Forum. In March 1955, Richard was suspended for the remainder of the season, including the playoffs, after he received a match penalty for slashing Boston's Hal Laycoe then punching a linesman who attempted to intervene. The suspension touched off a wave of anger towards league president Clarence Campbell, who was warned not to attend a scheduled game in Montreal after receiving numerous death threats, mainly from French-Canadians accusing him of anti-French bias. Campbell dismissed the warnings, and attended the March 17 game as planned. His presence at the game was perceived by many fans as a provocation and he was booed and pelted with eggs and fruit. An hour into the game, a fan lobbed a tear-gas bomb in Campbell's direction, and firefighters decided to clear the building. Fans leaving the game and a growing mob of angry demonstrators rioted outside of the Montreal Forum, which became known as l'affaire Richard, or the Richard Riot. Richard became the first player to score 500 career goals on October 19, 1957. He retired in 1960 as an eight-time Stanley Cup champion, as well as the NHL's all-time leading scorer with 544 goals.

In the fall of 1951, Maple Leafs owner Conn Smythe watched special television feeds of games in an attempt to determine whether it would be a suitable medium for broadcasting hockey games. Television already had its detractors within the NHL, especially in Campbell. In 1952, even though only 10% of Canadians owned a television set, the Canadian Broadcasting Corporation (CBC) began televising games. On November 1, 1952, Hockey Night in Canada was first broadcast on television, with Foster Hewitt calling the action between the Leafs and Bruins at Maple Leaf Gardens. The broadcasts quickly became the highest-rated show on Canadian television. Campbell feared televised hockey would cause people to stop attending games in person, but Smythe felt the opposite. CBS first broadcast hockey games in the United States in the 1956–57 season as an experiment. Amazed with the initial popularity of the broadcasts, it inaugurated a 21-game package of games the following year. The NHL itself adapted to be viewer-friendly. In 1949, the league mandated that the ice surface be painted white to make the puck easier to see. On January 18, 1958, Willie O'Ree joined the Bruins as an injury call-up for a game in Montreal. In doing so he became the first black player in the NHL.

Clint Benedict was the first goaltender to wear facial protection, donning it in 1930 to protect a broken nose. He quickly abandoned his mask as its design interfered with his vision. Twenty-nine years later, on November 1, 1959, in a game against New York Rangers Jacques Plante made the goaltender mask a permanent fixture in hockey. The first players' union was formed February 12, 1957, by Red Wings player Ted Lindsay who had sat on the board of the NHL's Pension Society since 1952. Lindsay and his fellow players were upset by the league's refusal to let them view the books related to the pension fund. The league claimed that it could not contribute more than it did but the players on the Pension Committee suspected otherwise. The idea quickly gained popularity and when the union's founding was announced publicly, nearly every NHL player had signed up. Led by Alan Eagleson, the National Hockey League Players' Association (NHLPA) was formed in 1967 and it quickly received acceptance from the owners.

=== Dynasties ===
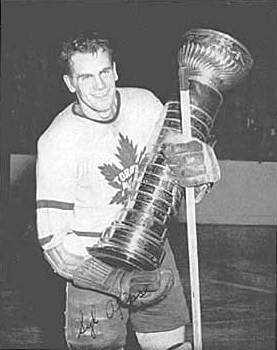
Syl Apps, with the Cup before it was redesigned, in the 1940s

The Original Six era was a period of dynasties. The Toronto Maple Leafs won the Stanley Cup five times between 1944–45 and 1950–51. In the 1951 Stanley Cup Final, the Maple Leafs defeated the Canadiens four games to one in the only final in NHL history when all games were decided in overtime. Beginning in 1948–49, the Red Wings won seven consecutive regular season titles, a feat that no other team has accomplished. During that time, the Wings won four Stanley Cups. It was during the 1952 Stanley Cup Final that the Legend of the Octopus was created. Brothers Pete and Jerry Cusimano brought a dead octopus to the Detroit Olympia for the fourth game of the finals. They hoped that the octopus would inspire Detroit to an eighth game victory. Detroit went on to defeat Montreal 3–0 and the tradition was born. The Red Wings faced the Canadiens in the Stanley Cup Final in three consecutive seasons between 1954 and 1956. Detroit won the first two match-ups, but Montreal captured the 1956 Stanley Cup, ending one dynasty and starting another. The Canadiens won five consecutive championships between 1956 and 1960, a feat no other team has duplicated. The Original Six era ended with the 1967 Stanley Cup Final between the two-time defending champion Canadiens, and the Maple Leafs. The Maple Leafs finished the era by winning the Cup four times between 1962 and 1967, their 1967 championship is the last Maple Leafs title to date. The Chicago Blackhawks, who won in 1961, are the only other team to win the Stanley Cup during this period.

== 1967–1992: Expansion era ==
=== Expansion years ===
In 1963, Rangers governor William Jennings introduced to his peers the idea of expanding the league to the American West Coast by adding two new teams for the 1964–65 season. While the governors did not agree to the proposal, the topic of expansion came up every time the owners met from then on out. In 1965, it was decided to expand by six teams, doubling the size of the NHL. In February 1966, the governors met and decided to award franchises to Los Angeles, Minnesota, Philadelphia, Pittsburgh, Oakland and St. Louis. The league rejected bids from Baltimore, Buffalo and Vancouver. In Canada, there was widespread outrage over the denial of an expansion team to Vancouver in 1967; three years later, the NHL awarded a franchise to Vancouver, which formerly played in the Western Hockey League, for the 1970–71 season, along with the Buffalo Sabres.

On January 13, 1968, North Stars' rookie Bill Masterton became the first, and to date, only player to die as a result of injuries suffered during an NHL game. Early in a game against Oakland, Masterton was checked hard by two players causing him to flip over backwards and land on his head. Masterton was rushed to hospital with massive head injuries, and died there two days later. The National Hockey League Writers Association presented the league with the Bill Masterton Memorial Trophy later in the season. Following Masterton's death, players slowly began wearing helmets, and starting in the 1979–80 season, the league mandated all players entering the league wear them.

In the 1968–69 season, third-year defenceman Bobby Orr scored 21 goals to set an NHL record for goals by a defenceman en route to winning his first of eight consecutive Norris Trophies as the league's top defenceman. At the same time, Orr's teammate, Phil Esposito, became the first player in league history to score 100 points in a season, finishing with 126 points. A gifted scorer, Orr revolutionized defencemen's impact on the offensive part of the game, as blue-liners began to be judged on how well they created goals in addition to how well they prevented them. Orr twice won the Art Ross Trophy as the NHL's leading scorer, the only defenceman in NHL history to do so. Chronic knee problems plagued Orr throughout his career; he played 12 seasons in the NHL before injuries forced his retirement in 1978. Orr finished with 270 goals and 915 points in 657 games, and he won the Hart Memorial Trophy as league Most Valuable Player thrice.

For the 1970–71 NHL season, two new teams, the Buffalo Sabres and Vancouver Canucks made their debuts and were both put into the East Division. The Chicago Black Hawks were moved to the West Division. The Montreal Canadiens won the Stanley Cup by beating the Black Hawks in seven games in the finals.

The 1970s were associated with aggressive, and often violent play. Known as the "Broad Street Bullies", the Philadelphia Flyers are the most famous example of this mindset. The Flyers established league records for penalty minutes—Dave "the Hammer" Schultz' total of 472 in 1974–75 remains a league record. They captured the 1974 Stanley Cup, becoming the first expansion team to win the league championship.

=== WHA competition and merger ===
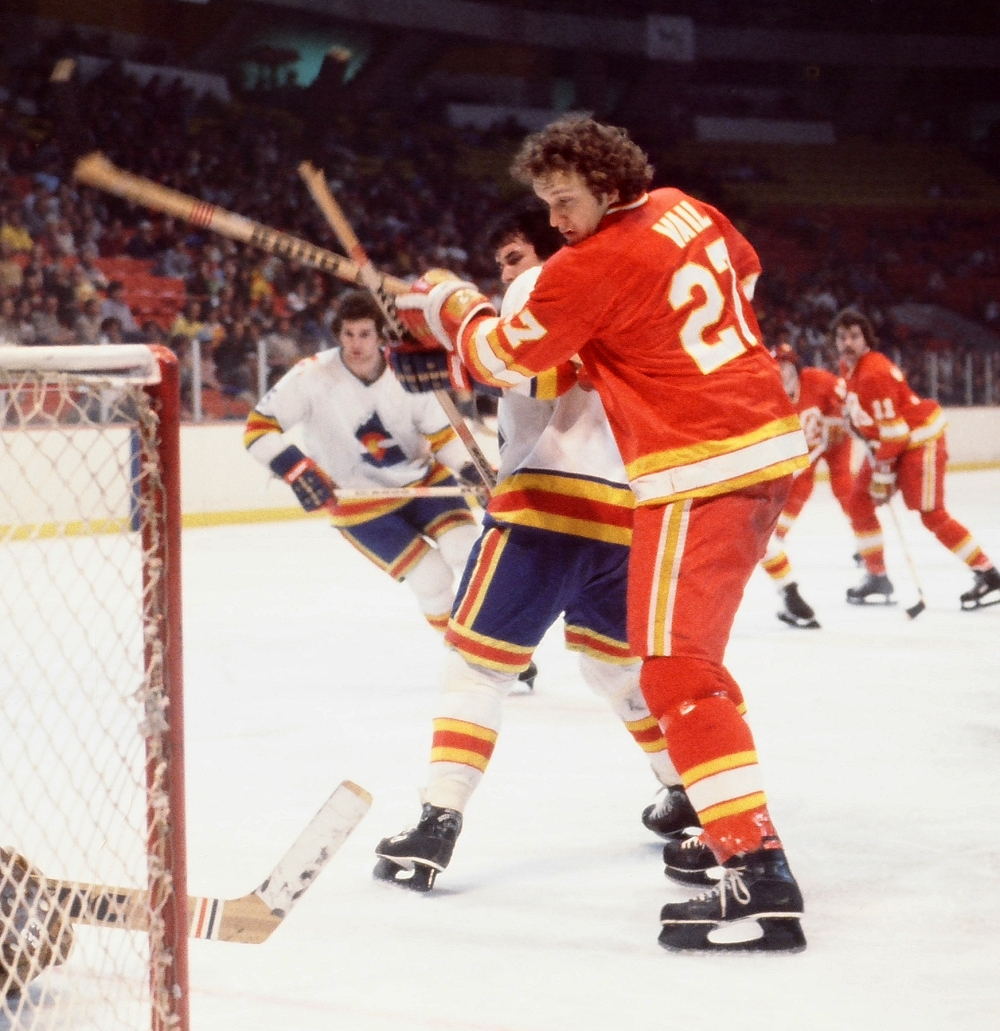
The Colorado Rockies battle the Atlanta Flames in 1978. These teams are now the New Jersey Devils and Calgary Flames respectively.

In 1972, the NHL faced competition from the newly formed World Hockey Association (WHA). The WHA lured many players away from the NHL. The WHA's biggest coup was to lure Bobby Hull from the Black Hawks to play for the Winnipeg Jets. He signed a $2.75 million contract, and lent instant credibility to the new league. After Hull signed, several other players quickly followed suit and the NHL suddenly found itself in a war for talent. By the time the 1972–73 WHA season began, 67 players had switched from the NHL to the WHA. The NHL also found itself competing with the WHA for markets. Initially, the league had no intention to expand past 14 teams, but the threat the WHA represented caused the league to change its plans. The league hastily announced the creation of the New York Islanders and Atlanta Flames as 1972 expansion teams. Following the 1972–73 season, the NHL announced it was further expanding to 18-teams for the 1974–75 season, adding the Kansas City Scouts and Washington Capitals. In just eight years, the NHL had tripled in size to 18 teams.

By 1976, both leagues were dealing with serious financial problems. The St. Louis Blues were on the verge of bankruptcy. Talk of a merger between the NHL and the WHA was growing. In 1976, for the first time in four decades, the NHL approved franchise relocations; the Scouts moved after just two years in Kansas City to Denver to become the Colorado Rockies, while the California Golden Seals became the Cleveland Barons. Two years later, after failed overtures about merging the Barons with Washington and Vancouver, the Barons merged with the Minnesota North Stars, reducing the NHL to 17 teams for 1978–79.

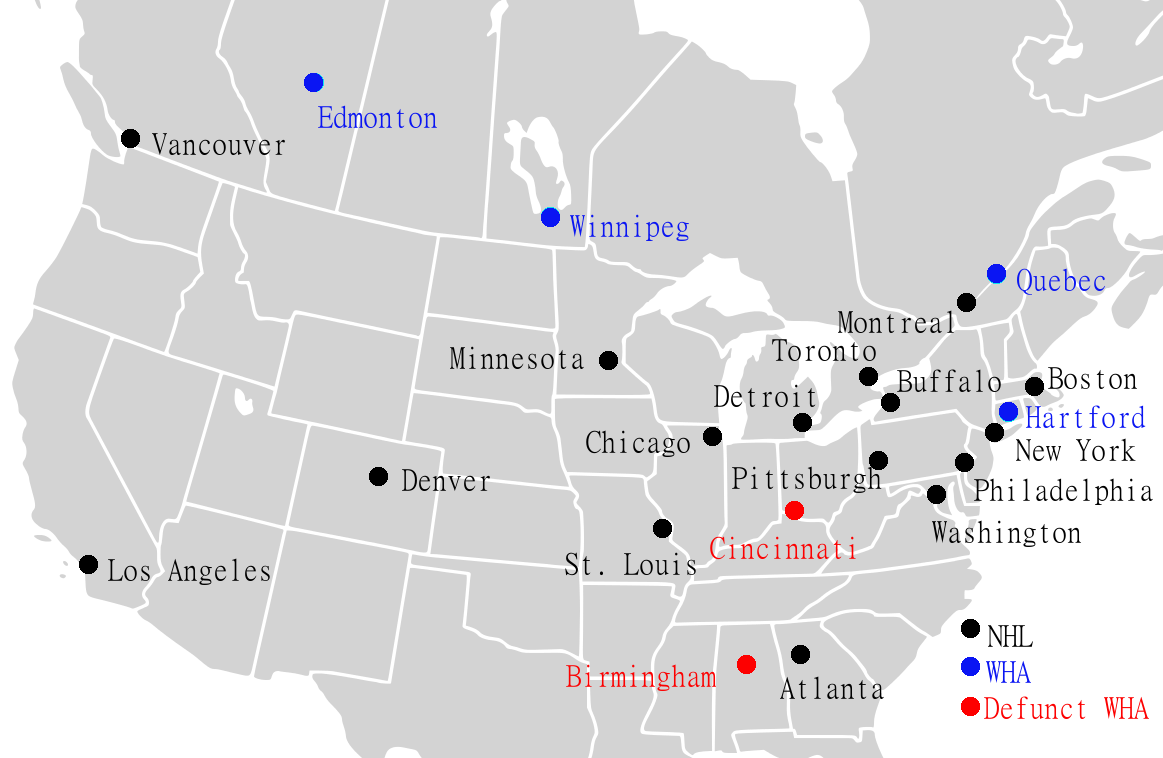
Cities that hosted NHL and WHA teams at the time of the NHL-WHA merger in 1979. Four WHA teams joined the NHL, while the two remaining teams joined the CHL.

The move towards a merger picked up in 1977 when John Ziegler succeeded Clarence Campbell as NHL president. The WHA folded following the 1978–79 season, while the Edmonton Oilers, Hartford Whalers, Quebec Nordiques and Winnipeg Jets joined the NHL as expansion teams, which brought the league up to 21 teams, until 1991. The merger brought Gordie Howe back to the NHL for one final season in 1979–80, during which he brought his NHL career total to 801 goals and 1,850 points. It was also the last season for the Atlanta Flames. The team averaged only 9,800 fans in attendance and lost over $2 million. They were sold for a record $16 million, and relocated north to become the Calgary Flames in 1980–81. Two years later, the Rockies were sold for $30 million, and left Denver to become the New Jersey Devils for the 1982–83 season.

=== More dynasties ===
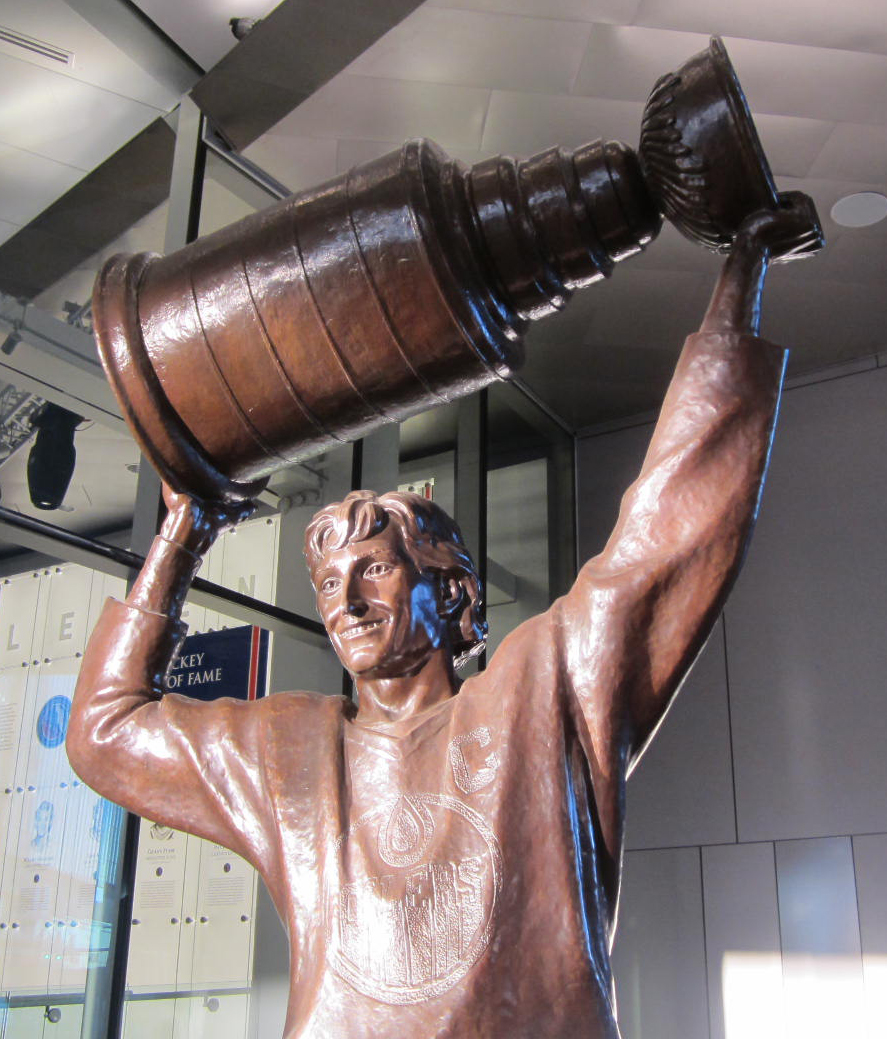
A statue of Wayne Gretzky raising the Stanley Cup in front of Edmonton's Rogers Place.

Although the league expanded from six to 21 teams, dynasties still prevailed in the NHL. The Montreal Canadiens won four consecutive Stanley Cups starting in 1975-76. In 1980, the New York Islanders won their first of four consecutive Stanley Cups. The Islanders dominated both the regular season and the playoffs with the likes of Billy Smith, Mike Bossy, Denis Potvin, and Bryan Trottier. In 1981, Bossy became the first player to score 50 goals in 50 games since Maurice Richard accomplished that feat in 1945.

In 1982–83, the Edmonton Oilers had the best record. The Oilers were led by Wayne Gretzky, who remained with the Oilers when they joined the NHL in 1979. He scored 137 points in 1979–80 and won the first of nine Hart Trophies as the NHL's most valuable player. Over the next several seasons, Gretzky established new highs in goals scored in a season, with 92 in the 1981–82 season; in assists, with 163 in the 1985–86; and in total points, with 215 in 1985–86. Gretzky also set the record for scoring 50 goals in the fewest games, achieving the mark in 39 games. The Islanders and Oilers met in the Finals as New York swept Edmonton for their last Stanley Cup. The following season, the Oilers and Islanders met again in the playoffs. The Oilers won the rematch in five games, marking the start of another dynasty.

Led by Gretzky and Mark Messier, the Oilers won five Stanley Cup championships between 1984 and 1990. On August 9, 1988, Oilers owner Peter Pocklington, in financial trouble, traded Gretzky to the Los Angeles Kings. Gretzky's trade to the Kings popularized ice hockey in the United States. With the Kings, Gretzky broke Gordie Howe's record for the most career points. Mario Lemieux led Pittsburgh to Stanley Cups in 1990–91 and 1991–92. A gifted forward, he won six Art Ross Trophies as the league's leading scorer and he scored 199 points in 1988–89, becoming the second highest single-season point scorer behind Gretzky. Lemieux's career was plagued by health issues, including non-Hodgkin lymphoma, and he retired in 1997. In 2000, he returned and finished his NHL career in 2006 with more than 1,700 points.

=== Fall of the Iron Curtain ===
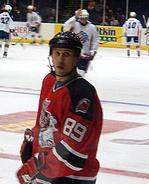
Alexander Mogilny, pictured in 2006, was among the first Soviets to play in the NHL in 1989.

The NHL became first involved in international play in the mid-1970s, starting with the Summit Series in 1972 which pitted the top Canadian players of the NHL against the top players in the Soviet Union. With the eight-game series tied at three wins apiece and a tie, Paul Henderson scooped up a rebound and put it past Soviet goaltender Vladislav Tretiak with 34 seconds left in the eighth and final game to score the series-winning goal.

While European-born players were a part of the NHL since its founding, it was still rare to see them in the NHL until 1980, although the WHA employed a number of them. Börje Salming was the first European star in the NHL and Finns Jari Kurri and Esa Tikkanen helped lead the Oilers dynasty of the 1980s. The WHA opened the door, and players slowly joined the NHL, but those behind the Iron Curtain were restricted from following suit. In 1980, Peter Šťastný, his wife, and his brother Anton secretly fled Czechoslovakia with the aid of Nordiques owner Marcel Aubut. The Šťastnýs' defection made international headlines, and contributed to the first wave of Europeans' entrance into the NHL. Hoping that they would one day be permitted to play in the NHL, teams drafted Soviet players in the 1980s, 27 in all by the 1988 draft; however, defection was the only way such players could play in the NHL. Shortly before the end of the 1988–89 regular season, Flames general manager Cliff Fletcher announced that he had reached an agreement with Soviet authorities that allowed Sergei Pryakhin to play in North America. It was the first time a member of the Soviet national team was permitted to leave the Soviet Union. Shortly after, Soviet players began to flood into the NHL. Teams anticipated that there would be an influx of Soviet players in the 1990s, as 18 Soviets were selected in the 1989 NHL entry draft.

== 1992–2017: Further expansion ==
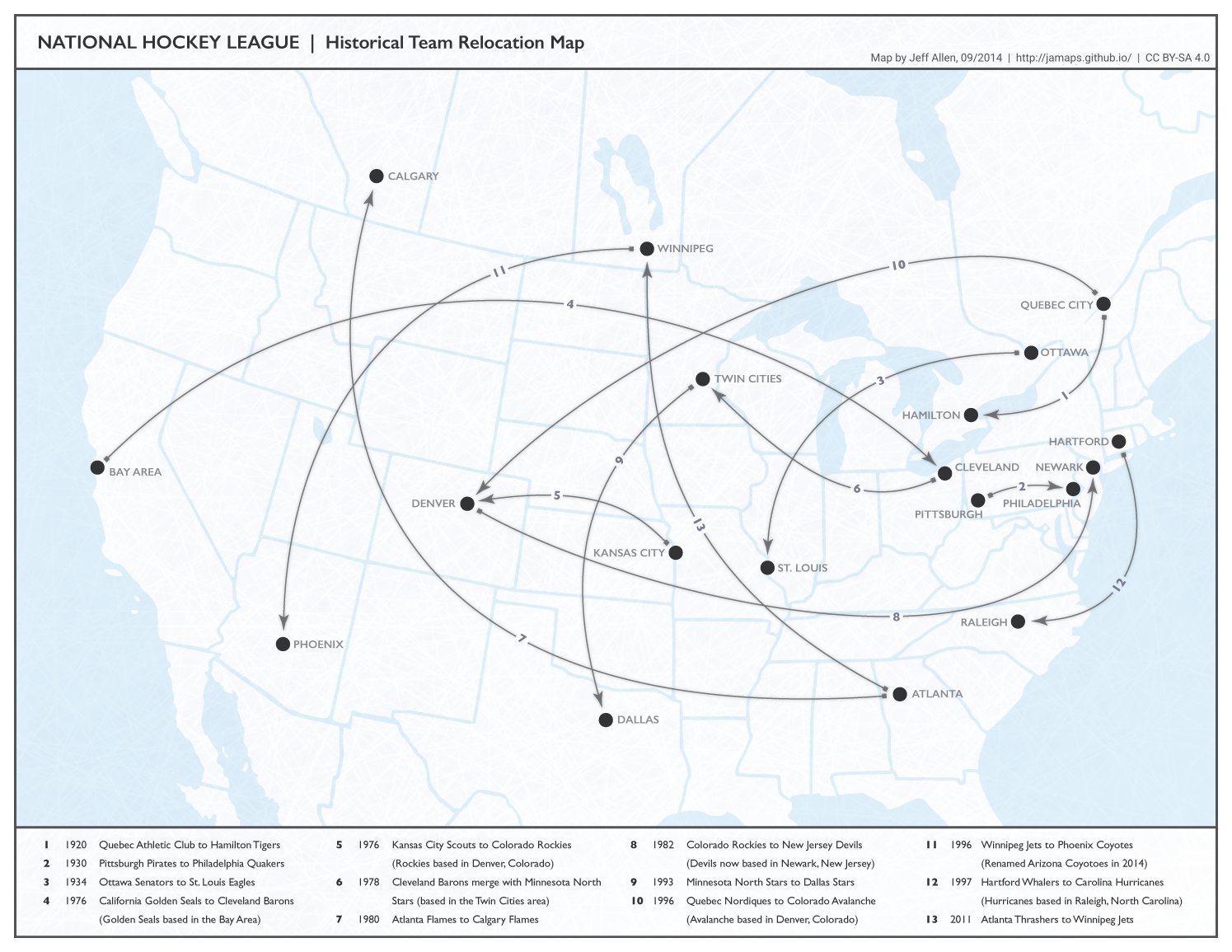
Map of relocated NHL teams

=== Southward expansion (1992–2000) ===
The 21-team era ended in 1990, when the league revealed ambitious plans to double league revenues from $400 million within a decade and bring the NHL to 28 franchises during that period. The NHL quickly announced three new teams: The San Jose Sharks, who began play in the 1991–92 season, and the Ottawa Senators and Tampa Bay Lightning, who followed a year later. The Lightning made NHL history when goaltender Manon Rhéaume played a period of an exhibition game, September 23, 1992. In doing so, Rhéaume became the first woman to play in an NHL game. One year later, the Mighty Ducks of Anaheim and Florida Panthers began play as the NHL's 25th and 26th franchises respectively. The two new franchises were granted as part of the NHL's attempts at regaining a network television presence by expanding throughout the American south. The NHL's southward push continued in 1993 as the Minnesota North Stars moved to Dallas, Texas, to become the Dallas Stars.

In 1994, the players were locked out by the owners because of a lack of a Collective Bargaining Agreement (CBA). The 1994–95 NHL lockout lasted 104 days and resulted in the season's being shortened from a planned 84 games to 48. The owners insisted on a salary cap, changes to free agency and arbitration in the hopes of limiting escalating salaries, the union instead proposed a luxury tax system. Just as the entire season seemed to be lost, an 11th-hour deal was agreed on. The owners failed to achieve a full salary cap but the deal was initially hailed as a win for the owners. The deal was not enough to save two teams in Canada's smallest NHL markets. The revenue disparity between large and small market teams, exacerbated by the falling value of the Canadian Dollar, forced the Quebec Nordiques to move to Denver and become the Colorado Avalanche in 1995; the Winnipeg Jets relocated to Phoenix, Arizona, becoming the Coyotes, the next year. The Hartford Whalers followed, moving to Greensboro, NC and becoming the Carolina Hurricanes in 1997. The NHL continued its expansion into cities in the Southern United States. In 1998, the Nashville Predators joined the league, followed by the Atlanta Thrashers the following year. To further market their players, the NHL decided to have its players play in the Winter Olympics, starting in 1998, at the Nagano Games. In 2000, the league added two franchises, boosting the total number to 30. The NHL returned to Minnesota with the Wild and added the Blue Jackets in Columbus, Ohio.

=== 2004–05 lockout ===
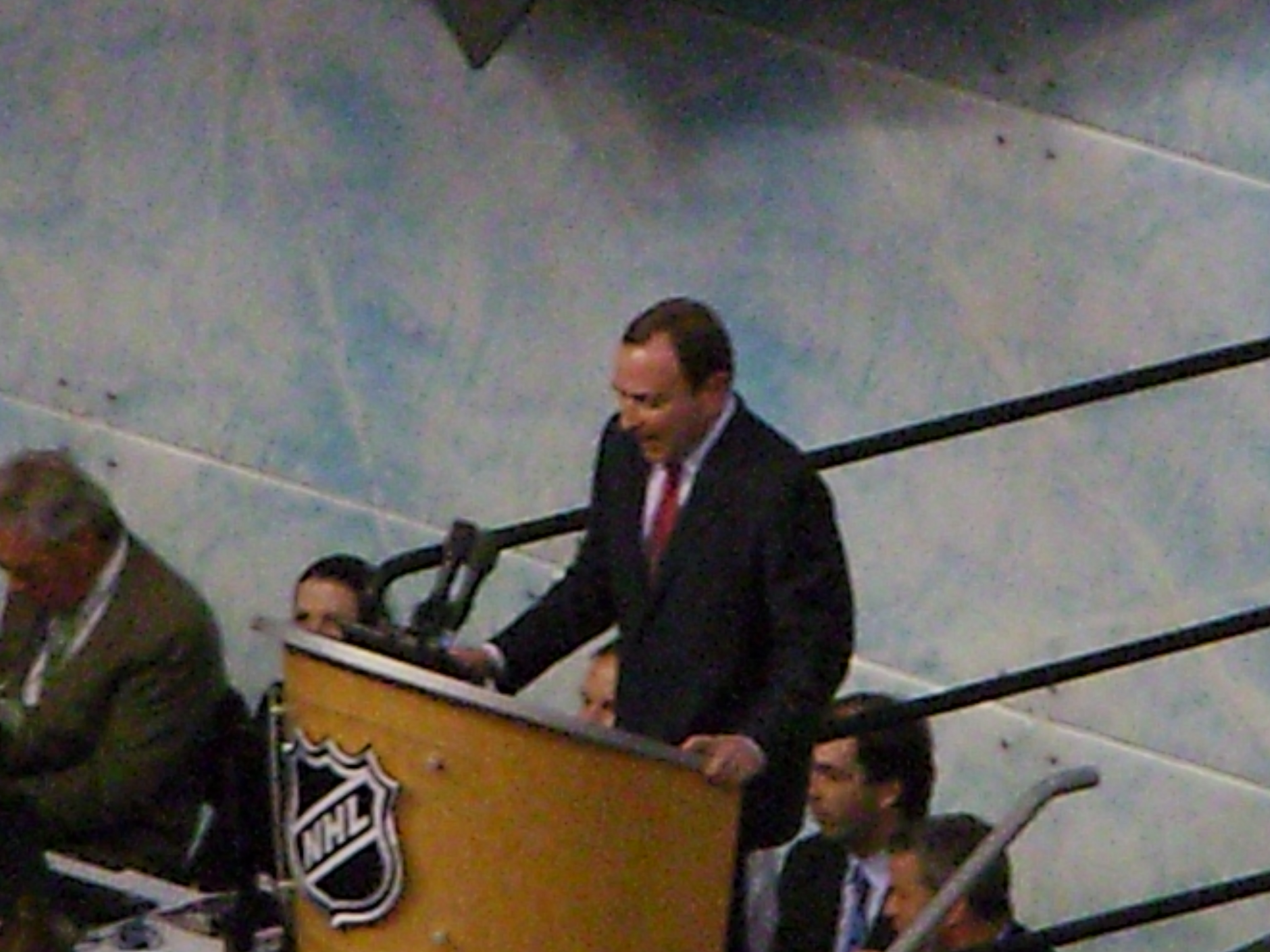
Gary Bettman, pictured in 2008, joined the NHL as its first commissioner in 1993.

By 2004, the owners were claiming that player salaries had grown far faster than revenues, and that the league as a whole lost over US$300 million in 2002–03. As a result, on September 15, 2004, Gary Bettman announced that the owners again locked the players out before the start of the 2004–05 season. On February 16, 2005, Bettman announced the cancellation of the entire season. As with the 1994–95 lockout, the owners were again demanding a salary cap, which the players were unwilling to consider until the season was on the verge of being lost. The season's cancellation led to a revolt within the union. NHLPA president Trevor Linden and senior director Ted Saskin took charge of negotiations from executive director Bob Goodenow. By early July, the two sides had agreed to a new collective bargaining agreement. The deal featured a hard salary cap, linked to a fixed percentage of league revenues and a 24% rollback on salaries.

=== 21st century ===
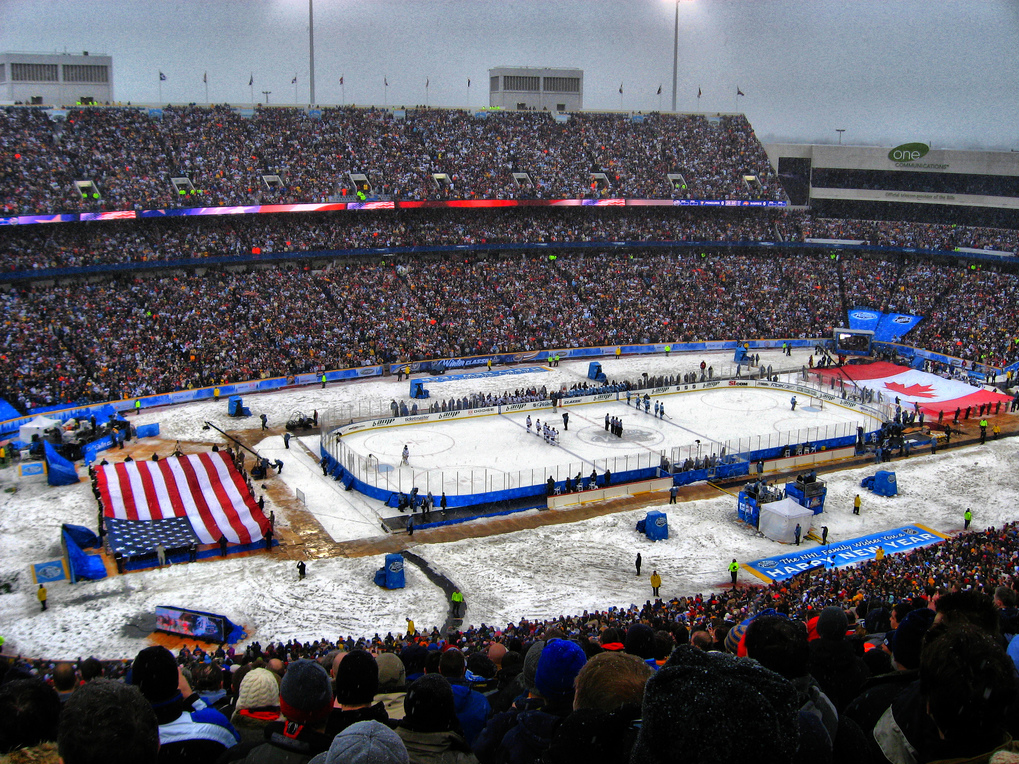
Arena setup at Ralph Wilson Stadium in Buffalo for the 2008 Winter Classic

Hoping to reduce the number of tie games during the regular season, the NHL decided that beginning in the 1999–2000 season, in any game tied after regulation time, both teams would be guaranteed one point, while the team that won in overtime would earn a second point. The Edmonton Oilers hosted the NHL's first regular season outdoor hockey game, the Heritage Classic on November 22, 2003. The game against the Canadiens was held at Commonwealth Stadium before a then-record crowd of 57,167 fans who endured temperatures as low as −18 degrees Celsius (0 degrees Fahrenheit). In the 2005–06 season, the NHL eliminated tie games, as the shootout was introduced to decide all regular season games tied after the five-minute overtime period. The shootout was one of several rule changes made in 2005, as the league attempted to open the game up after the lockout. One of the most controversial changes was the league's zero-tolerance policy on obstruction penalties. The league hoped that the game could be opened up if it cracked down on "clutching and grabbing". The tighter regulations have met with numerous complaints about the legitimacy of some calls, that players are diving to draw penalties, and that officials are not calling enough penalties. The changes initially led to a sharp increase in scoring. Teams combined to score 6.1 goals per game in 2005–06, more than a full goal per game higher than in the 2003–04 season. This represented the highest increase in offence since 1929–30. However, scoring has rapidly declined since, approaching pre-lockout totals in 2007–08.

In the 2005–06 season, rookies Alexander Ovechkin and Sidney Crosby began their careers. In their first three seasons, they each won both the Art Ross and Hart trophies; Crosby in 2007, and Ovechkin in 2008. The success of the Heritage Classic led to the scheduling of more outdoor games. The Sabres hosted the 2008 NHL Winter Classic on New Year's Day 2008, losing to the Pittsburgh Penguins in a shootout before a crowd of 71,217 at Ralph Wilson Stadium. The second Winter Classic was held January 1, 2009, at Wrigley Field in Chicago between the Blackhawks and Red Wings. The third NHL Winter Classic was held in Fenway Park on January 1, 2010, between the Boston Bruins and the Philadelphia Flyers. The home team Bruins won.

Two clubs still experienced financial problems, however. The Phoenix Coyotes eventually filed for bankruptcy in May 2009. The league then took control over the team later that year in order to stabilize the club's operations, with the hopes of eventually reselling it to a new owner who would be committed to stay in the Phoenix market. The league did not find a satisfactory buyer for the Coyotes until 2013. Eleven years later, the Coyotes ceased operations while a new team in Utah began. The financially struggling Atlanta Thrashers were eventually sold to True North Sports and Entertainment in 2011, who then relocated the team to Winnipeg, a stark reversal of the league's Southward expansion more than a decade earlier.

The NHL again entered lockout in 2012, cancelling the first 526 games, about 43% of the season, until at least December 30, 2012. Just after 5 am on January 6, 2013, after approximately 16 continuous hours of negotiating, the NHL and the players' union reached a tentative deal on a new collective bargaining agreement to end the lockout. The first games of the season were held on January 19.

== 2017–present: Modern era ==
=== League's second century ===
In 2017, the league began its second century and expanded again to Las Vegas, Nevada, with the Vegas Golden Knights. In 2018, the league approved another expansion team in Seattle, Washington, the Seattle Kraken, which began play in 2021.

On May 26, 2020, the NHL declared that 2019–20 regular season (which had been suspended after March 11) would be prematurely terminated due to the COVID-19 pandemic in North America; the league subsequently announced on July 1 that the season would end with a 24-team playoff tournament to be held behind closed doors in Toronto and Edmonton from August 1.

=== League expands to Utah, Coyotes suspend operations ===
On April 18, 2024, the Arizona Coyotes were deactivated, and its players and personnel were transferred to the Utah Mammoth (at the time temporarily named the Utah Hockey Club). Under the original conditions, the Coyotes franchise would have been reactivated if a suitable arena was built in Arizona by 2029. After the Arizona State Land Department cancelled a June 2024 auction for a parcel of land that Coyotes owner Alex Meruelo intended to purchase as a site for a new arena, he relinquished his rights as the team's owner on July 10.

== See also ==
- Timeline of the National Hockey League
- List of NHL seasons
- Race and ethnicity in the NHL
- Black players in ice hockey
- LGBTQ people in ice hockey
