= Central Division (NHL) =

Division of the National Hockey League

- Formerly: Norris Division
- Conference: Western Conference
- League: National Hockey League
- Sport: Ice hockey
- Founded: 1993
- No. of teams: 8
- Most recent champion: Colorado Avalanche (4th title) (2025–26)
- Most titles: Detroit Red Wings (13 titles)

Central Division teams location

The National Hockey League's Central Division was formed in 1993 as part of the Western Conference in a league realignment. Its predecessor was the Norris Division, and it's also one of two successors to the Northwest Division. The Chicago Blackhawks have been a member of the Central Division in all of its seasons since the original 1993 realignment. The Dallas Stars and St. Louis Blues were also original members of the division, but were realigned to a different division for a while before returning; the Stars were moved to the Pacific Division in 1998 (the Stars moved back to the Central in 2013, and the Coyotes followed in 2021), while the Blues were moved to the West Division during the temporary 2020–21 realignment. The Winnipeg Jets were an original member of the division before it deactivated in 1996, with its hockey assets relocating to Phoenix as the Coyotes. The Coyotes assumed the Jets' place in the Central Division before moving to the Pacific Division in 1998. A second incarnation of the Jets–formerly the Atlanta Thrashers from 1999 to 2011–moved back to the Central Division in 2013. Two of its teams—the Minnesota Wild and Nashville Predators—joined the NHL during a league expansion phase between 1998 and 2000. The fourth team in that three-year expansion period, the Columbus Blue Jackets, was once a member of the Central Division, but moved to the Metropolitan Division after the 2013 realignment. In all, the division today comprises the Blackhawks, Jets, Stars, Blues, Wild, Predators, Colorado Avalanche, and Utah Mammoth.

After the addition of the Vegas Golden Knights to the Pacific Division in 2017, the Central Division was the only division in the NHL without eight teams. This situation remained in effect until the 2020–21 NHL season, when the COVID-19 pandemic compelled a radical re-alignment of the divisions, including the temporary abolition of the Eastern and Western conferences. The Central Division was the only existing division retained for the 2020–21 NHL season. Only three of the eight Central Division teams for 2020–21 were members of the division in the previous season. Two seasons later, the Pacific gained another expansion team in the Seattle Kraken, and the Coyotes returned to the Central. In 2024, the Coyotes were relocated to Salt Lake City to become the Mammoth, forming the present members of the Central.

The Central Division has sent five teams to the Stanley Cup playoffs on seven occasions. In the first three seasons after the realignment of 2013, Central Division teams occupied both Wild Card playoff spots in the Western Conference. This occurred again in the 2018–19 season, for the fourth time in six seasons. In the pandemic-shortened 2019–20 season, all Central Division teams made the 2020 Stanley Cup playoffs due to the 24-team format.

== Division lineups ==
=== 1993–1996 ===
1993–1996 Central Division teams
- Chicago Blackhawks
- Dallas Stars
- Detroit Red Wings
- St. Louis Blues
- Toronto Maple Leafs
- Winnipeg Jets

==== Changes from the 1992–93 season ====
- The Central Division is formed as the result of NHL realignment
- The Minnesota North Stars move to Dallas, Texas, and become the Dallas Stars
- The Chicago Blackhawks, Dallas Stars, Detroit Red Wings, St. Louis Blues, and Toronto Maple Leafs come from the Norris Division
- The Winnipeg Jets come from the Smythe Division

=== 1996–1998 ===
1996–1998 Central Division teams
- Chicago Blackhawks
- Dallas Stars
- Detroit Red Wings
- Phoenix Coyotes
- St. Louis Blues
- Toronto Maple Leafs

==== Changes from the 1995–96 season ====
- The Winnipeg Jets were deactivated
- The Jets' hockey operations including draft picks, personnel and player contracts moved to Phoenix, Arizona, to become the Phoenix Coyotes
- The Phoenix Coyotes are added as an expansion team

=== 1998–2000 ===
1998–2000 Central Division teams
- Chicago Blackhawks
- Detroit Red Wings
- Nashville Predators
- St. Louis Blues

==== Changes from the 1997–98 season ====
- The Dallas Stars and Phoenix Coyotes move to the Pacific Division
- The Toronto Maple Leafs move to the Northeast Division
- The Nashville Predators are added as an expansion team

=== 2000–2013 ===
2000–2013 Central Division teams
- Chicago Blackhawks
- Columbus Blue Jackets
- Detroit Red Wings
- Nashville Predators
- St. Louis Blues

==== Changes from the 1999–2000 season ====
- The Columbus Blue Jackets are added as an expansion team

=== 2013–2020 ===
2013–2020 Central Division teams
- Chicago Blackhawks
- Colorado Avalanche
- Dallas Stars
- Minnesota Wild
- Nashville Predators
- St. Louis Blues
- Winnipeg Jets

==== Changes from the 2012–13 season ====
- The Northwest Division is dissolved due to NHL realignment
- The Columbus Blue Jackets move to the Metropolitan Division
- The Detroit Red Wings move to the Atlantic Division
- The Colorado Avalanche and Minnesota Wild come from the Northwest Division
- The Dallas Stars come from the Pacific Division
- The Winnipeg Jets (reactivated as the Atlanta Thrashers from 1999 to 2011) come from the Southeast Division

=== 2020–2021 ===
2020–21 Central Division teams
- Carolina Hurricanes
- Chicago Blackhawks
- Columbus Blue Jackets
- Dallas Stars
- Detroit Red Wings
- Florida Panthers
- Nashville Predators
- Tampa Bay Lightning

==== Changes from the 2019–20 season ====
- Due to COVID-19 restrictions the NHL realigned into four divisions with no conferences for the 2020–21 season
- The Colorado Avalanche, Minnesota Wild and St. Louis Blues move to the West Division
- The Winnipeg Jets move to the North Division
- The Carolina Hurricanes and Columbus Blue Jackets come from the Metropolitan Division
- The Detroit Red Wings, Florida Panthers and Tampa Bay Lightning come from the Atlantic Division

=== 2021–2024 ===
2021–2024 Central Division teams
- Arizona Coyotes
- Chicago Blackhawks
- Colorado Avalanche
- Dallas Stars
- Minnesota Wild
- Nashville Predators
- St. Louis Blues
- Winnipeg Jets

==== Changes from the 2020–21 season ====
- The league returned to using a four division and two conference alignment
- The Carolina Hurricanes and Columbus Blue Jackets move to the Metropolitan Division
- The Detroit Red Wings, Florida Panthers and Tampa Bay Lightning move to the Atlantic Division
- The Arizona Coyotes, Colorado Avalanche, Minnesota Wild and St. Louis Blues come from the West Division
- The Winnipeg Jets come from the North Division

From the 2013–20 alignment to this grouping, the only change was the addition of the Arizona Coyotes, moved from the Pacific Division to make room there for the expansion Seattle Kraken.

=== 2024–2025 ===
2024–25 Central Division teams
- Chicago Blackhawks
- Colorado Avalanche
- Dallas Stars
- Minnesota Wild
- Nashville Predators
- St. Louis Blues
- Utah Hockey Club
- Winnipeg Jets

==== Changes from the 2023–24 season ====
- The Arizona Coyotes cease operations
- The Coyotes' hockey operations including draft picks, personnel and player contracts are sold to the expansion Utah Hockey Club based in Salt Lake City, Utah
- The Utah Hockey Club are added as an expansion team

=== 2025–present ===
2025–present Central Division teams
- Chicago Blackhawks
- Colorado Avalanche
- Dallas Stars
- Minnesota Wild
- Nashville Predators
- St. Louis Blues
- Utah Mammoth
- Winnipeg Jets

==== Changes from the 2024–25 season ====
- The Utah Hockey Club is renamed to the Utah Mammoth

== Season results ==
^{(#)}	Denotes team that won the Stanley Cup
^{(#)}	Denotes team that won the Clarence S. Campbell Bowl, but lost Stanley Cup Final
^{(#)}	Denotes team that qualified for the Stanley Cup playoffs
‡	Denotes winner of the Presidents' Trophy

Season	1st	2nd	3rd	4th	5th	6th	7th	8th
1993–94	^{(1)} Detroit (100)	^{(3)} Toronto (98)	^{(4)} Dallas (97)	^{(5)} St. Louis (91)	^{(6)} Chicago (87)	Winnipeg (57)		
1994–95^{[a]}	^{(1)} Detroit (70)^{‡}	^{(3)} St. Louis (61)	^{(4)} Chicago (53)	^{(5)} Toronto (50)	^{(8)} Dallas (42)	Winnipeg (39)		
1995–96	^{(1)} Detroit (131)^{‡}	^{(3)} Chicago (94)	^{(4)} Toronto (80)	^{(5)} St. Louis (80)	^{(8)} Winnipeg (78)	Dallas (66)		
1996–97	^{(2)} Dallas (104)	^{(3)} Detroit (94)	^{(5)} Phoenix (83)	^{(6)} St. Louis (83)	^{(8)} Chicago (81)	Toronto (68)		
1997–98	^{(1)} Dallas (109)^{‡}	^{(3)} Detroit (103)	^{(4)} St. Louis (98)	^{(6)} Phoenix (82)	Chicago (73)	Toronto (69)		
1998–99	^{(3)} Detroit (93)	^{(5)} St. Louis (87)	Chicago (70)	Nashville (63)				
1999–2000	^{(1)} St. Louis (114)^{‡}	^{(4)} Detroit (108)	Chicago (78)	Nashville (70)				
2000–01	^{(2)} Detroit (111)	^{(4)} St. Louis (103)	Nashville (80)	Chicago (71)	Columbus (71)			
2001–02	^{(1)} Detroit (116)^{‡}	^{(4)} St. Louis (98)	^{(5)} Chicago (96)	Nashville (69)	Columbus (57)			
2002–03	^{(2)} Detroit (110)	^{(5)} St. Louis (99)	Chicago (79)	Nashville (74)	Columbus (69)			
2003–04	^{(1)} Detroit (109)^{‡}	^{(7)} St. Louis (91)	^{(8)} Nashville (91)	Columbus (62)	Chicago (59)			
2004–05	No season due to 2004–05 NHL lockout							
2005–06	^{(1)} Detroit (124)^{‡}	^{(4)} Nashville (106)	Columbus (74)	Chicago (65)	St. Louis (57)			
2006–07	^{(1)} Detroit (113)	^{(4)} Nashville (110)	St. Louis (81)	Columbus (73)	Chicago (71)			
2007–08	^{(1)} Detroit (115)^{‡}	^{(8)} Nashville (91)	Chicago (88)	Columbus (80)	St. Louis (79)			
2008–09	^{(2)} Detroit (112)	^{(4)}Chicago (104)	^{(6)} St. Louis (92)	^{(7)} Columbus (92)	Nashville (88)			
2009–10	^{(2)} Chicago (112)	^{(5)} Detroit (102)	^{(7)} Nashville (100)	St. Louis (90)	Columbus (79)			
2010–11	^{(3)} Detroit (104)	^{(5)} Nashville (99)	^{(8)} Chicago (97)	St. Louis (87)	Columbus (81)			
2011–12	^{(2)} St. Louis (109)	^{(4)} Nashville (104)	^{(5)} Detroit (102)	^{(6)} Chicago (101)	Columbus (65)			
2012–13^{[b]}	^{(1)} Chicago (77)^{‡}	^{(4)} St. Louis (60)	^{(7)} Detroit (56)	Columbus (55)	Nashville (41)			
2013–14	^{(1)} Colorado (112)	^{(2)} St. Louis (111)	^{(3)} Chicago (107)	^{(WC1)} Minnesota (98)	^{(WC2)} Dallas (91)	Nashville (88)	Winnipeg (84)	
2014–15	^{(1)} St. Louis (109)	^{(2)} Nashville (104)	^{(3)} Chicago (102)	^{(WC1)} Minnesota (100)	^{(WC2)} Winnipeg (99)	Dallas (92)	Colorado (90)	
2015–16	^{(1)} Dallas (109)	^{(2)} St. Louis (107)	^{(3)} Chicago (103)	^{(WC1)} Nashville (96)	^{(WC2)} Minnesota (87)	Colorado (82)	Winnipeg (78)	
2016–17	^{(1)} Chicago (109)	^{(2)} Minnesota (106)	^{(3)} St. Louis (99)	^{(WC2)} Nashville (94)	Winnipeg (87)	Dallas (79)	Colorado (48)	
2017–18	^{(1)} Nashville (117)^{‡}	^{(2)} Winnipeg (114)	^{(3)} Minnesota (101)	^{(WC2)} Colorado (95)	St. Louis (94)	Dallas (92)	Chicago (76)	
2018–19	^{(1)} Nashville (100)	^{(2)} Winnipeg (99)	^{(3)} St. Louis (99)	^{(WC1)} Dallas (93)	^{(WC2)} Colorado (90)	Chicago (84)	Minnesota (83)	
2019–20^{[c]}	^{(1)} St. Louis (71 gp 94 pts..662 ppct.)	^{(2)} Colorado (70 gp 92 pts..657 ppct.)	^{(4)} Dallas (69 gp 82 pts..594 ppct.)	^{(6)} Nashville (69 gp 78 pts..565 ppct.)	^{(9)} Winnipeg (71 gp 80 pts..563 ppct.)	^{(10)} Minnesota (69 gp 77 pts..558 ppct.)	^{(12)} Chicago (70 gp 72 pts..514 ppct.)	
2020–21^{[d]}	Temporary realignment for season							
2020–21^{[d]}	Carolina (80)	Florida (79)	Tampa Bay (75)	Nashville (64)	Dallas (60)	Chicago (55)	Detroit (48)	Columbus (48)
2021–22	^{(1)} Colorado (119)	^{(2)} Minnesota (113)	^{(3)} St. Louis (109)	^{(WC1)} Dallas (98)	^{(WC2)} Nashville (97)	Winnipeg (89)	Chicago (68)	Arizona (57)
2022–23	^{(1)} Colorado (109)	^{(2)} Dallas (108)	^{(3)} Minnesota (103)	^{(WC2)} Winnipeg (95)	Nashville (92)	St. Louis (81)	Arizona (70)	Chicago (59)
2023–24	^{(1)} Dallas (113)	^{(2)} Winnipeg (110)	^{(3)} Colorado (107)	^{(WC1)} Nashville (99)	St. Louis (92)	Minnesota (87)	Arizona (77)	Chicago (52)
2024–25	^{(1)} Winnipeg (116)^{‡}	^{(2)} Dallas (106)	^{(3)} Colorado (102)	^{(WC1)} Minnesota (97)	^{(WC2)} St. Louis (96)	Utah (89)	Nashville (68)	Chicago (61)
2025–26	^{(1)} Colorado (121)^{‡}	^{(2)} Dallas (112)	^{(3)} Minnesota (104)	^{(WC1)} Utah (92)	St. Louis (86)	Nashville (86)	Winnipeg (82)	Chicago (72)

Notes

- ^{a} The 1994–95 NHL season was shortened to 48 games due to the lockout.
- ^{b} The 2012–13 NHL season was shortened to 48 games due to the lockout.
- ^{c} The 2019–20 NHL season was cut short due to the COVID-19 pandemic. Due to the imbalance in the number of games played among teams, the regular season standings were determined by points percentage.
- ^{d} The 2020–21 NHL season was shortened to 56 games due to the COVID-19 pandemic and the Canada–United States border closure.

== Central Division titles won by team ==
Teams in bold are currently in the division.

Team	Wins	Last win
Detroit Red Wings	13	2011
**Colorado Avalanche**	4	2026
**Dallas Stars**	4	2024
**St. Louis Blues**	4	2020
**Chicago Blackhawks**	3	2017
**Nashville Predators**	2	2019
Carolina Hurricanes	1	2021
**Winnipeg Jets**	1	2025
Phoenix/Arizona Coyotes	0	—
Columbus Blue Jackets	0	—
Florida Panthers	0	—
**Minnesota Wild**	0	—
Tampa Bay Lightning	0	—
Toronto Maple Leafs	0	—
**Utah Mammoth**	0	—
