= Timeline of the National Hockey League =

The following is a complete history of organizational changes in the National Hockey League (NHL). The NHL was founded in 1917 as a successor to the National Hockey Association (NHA), starting out with four teams from the predecessor league, and eventually grew to thirty-two in its current state. The NHL has expanded and contracted numerous times throughout its history, including in 1979 when four teams were added from the World Hockey Association (WHA).

== 1917–1942: Early years ==
=== Four/three teams (1917–19) ===
The four teams that began the inaugural NHL season were the Montreal Canadiens, the Montreal Wanderers, the original Ottawa Senators, and the Toronto Arenas. However, after completing four games, the Wanderers withdrew from the league due to their arena burning down, and the NHL continued that season and the next with only three teams.

Withdrew after four games into the 1917–18 season §

1917–18 to 1918–19 NHL teams
Montreal Canadiens
Montreal Wanderers §
Ottawa Senators
Toronto Arenas

=== Four teams (1919–24) ===
In its third season, 1919–20, the NHL underwent its first expansion, adding the Quebec Bulldogs. Toronto changed its name to Toronto St. Patricks.

First season in the NHL *

1919–20 NHL teams
Montreal Canadiens
Ottawa Senators
Quebec Bulldogs *
Toronto St. Patricks

==== 1920: Quebec relocates to Hamilton ====
For the 1920–21 season, Quebec relocated to Hamilton and changed their name, becoming the Hamilton Tigers.

1920–21 to 1923–24 NHL teams
Hamilton Tigers
Montreal Canadiens
Ottawa Senators
Toronto St. Patricks

=== Six teams (1924–25) ===
Two new teams joined the NHL in its eighth season, the Boston Bruins, the first expansion team in the United States, and the Montreal Maroons.

First season in the NHL *
Last season in the NHL †

1924–25 NHL teams
Boston Bruins *
Hamilton Tigers †
Montreal Canadiens
Montreal Maroons *
Ottawa Senators
Toronto St. Patricks

=== Seven teams (1925–26) ===
The next season, the NHL added two new teams, the Pittsburgh Pirates and the New York Americans. The Americans were stocked by purchasing the contracts of the Hamilton Tigers players, and the Tigers franchise was subsequently revoked by the league.

First season in the NHL *

1925–26 NHL teams
Boston Bruins
Montreal Canadiens
Montreal Maroons
New York Americans *
Ottawa Senators
Pittsburgh Pirates *
Toronto St. Patricks

=== Ten teams (1926–31) ===
The NHL continued to expand the following 1926–27 season, adding the Chicago Black Hawks, the Detroit Cougars, and the New York Rangers, growing to ten teams, thus more than doubling its size in its first decade of existence. The league realigned into two divisions: the American Division and the Canadian Division. Despite its name, the Canadian Division contained at least one team based in the U.S. throughout its existence. At the same time, the Stanley Cup was contested between two NHL teams for the first time instead of at least one from an outside league.

Midway through the 1926–27 season, the Toronto St. Patricks were sold and renamed the Toronto Maple Leafs, however the league ruled the team must use the St. Patricks name until season's end.

1926–27 was the first season in the NHL *

1926–27 to 1929–30 NHL teams
Canadian Division	American Division
Montreal Canadiens	Boston Bruins
Montreal Maroons	Chicago Black Hawks *
New York Americans	Detroit Cougars *
Ottawa Senators	New York Rangers *
Toronto St. Patricks/Maple Leafs	Pittsburgh Pirates

==== 1930: Pittsburgh relocates to Philadelphia ====
For the 1930–31 season, the Pirates moved from Pittsburgh to Philadelphia, becoming the Philadelphia Quakers, and Detroit was renamed the Detroit Falcons.

Last season before hiatus, rejoined NHL later ^
Last season in the NHL †

1930–31 NHL teams
Canadian Division	American Division
Montreal Canadiens	Boston Bruins
Montreal Maroons	Chicago Black Hawks
New York Americans	Detroit Falcons
Ottawa Senators ^	New York Rangers
Toronto Maple Leafs	Philadelphia Quakers †

=== Eight teams (1931–32) ===
After fourteen seasons of steady expansion, the NHL contracted to eight teams, dropping the Philadelphia Quakers and the original Ottawa Senators for the 1931–32 season.

1931–32 NHL teams
Canadian Division	American Division
Montreal Canadiens	Boston Bruins
Montreal Maroons	Chicago Black Hawks
New York Americans	Detroit Falcons
Toronto Maple Leafs	New York Rangers

=== Nine teams (1932–35) ===
For the 1932–33 season, after missing one season, the original Ottawa Senators rejoined the NHL, and the Detroit Falcons were renamed the Detroit Red Wings.

Rejoined NHL *

1932–33 to 1933–34 NHL teams
Canadian Division	American Division
Montreal Canadiens	Boston Bruins
Montreal Maroons	Chicago Black Hawks
New York Americans	Detroit Red Wings
Ottawa Senators *	New York Rangers
Toronto Maple Leafs	

==== 1934: Ottawa relocates to St. Louis ====
For the 1934–35 season, the Ottawa Senators relocated, becoming the St. Louis Eagles.

Last season in the NHL †

1934–35 NHL teams
Canadian Division	American Division
Montreal Canadiens	Boston Bruins
Montreal Maroons	Chicago Black Hawks
New York Americans	Detroit Red Wings
St. Louis Eagles †	New York Rangers
Toronto Maple Leafs	

=== Eight teams (1935–38) ===
The Eagles folded after one season, and the NHL was once again an eight-team league for three seasons.

Withdrew after the 1937–38 season †

1935–36 to 1937–38 NHL teams
Canadian Division	American Division
Montreal Canadiens	Boston Bruins
Montreal Maroons †	Chicago Black Hawks
New York Americans	Detroit Red Wings
Toronto Maple Leafs	New York Rangers

=== Seven teams (1938–42) ===
The Montreal Maroons withdrew from the league for the 1938–39 season, further reducing the number of teams in the NHL to seven, shrinking to the size the league was in 1925–26. Play continued for four seasons with seven teams, with one single league table instead of any conference or divisions.

1938–39 to 1940–41 NHL teams
Boston Bruins
Chicago Black Hawks
Detroit Red Wings
Montreal Canadiens
New York Americans
New York Rangers
Toronto Maple Leafs

==== 1941: Americans change their name ====
The New York Americans changed their name to the Brooklyn Americans for the 1941–42 season, their last.

Folded after the 1941–42 season †

1941–42 NHL teams
Boston Bruins
Brooklyn Americans †
Chicago Black Hawks
Detroit Red Wings
Montreal Canadiens
New York Rangers
Toronto Maple Leafs

== 1942–1967: Original Six era ==
The 1942–43 season saw the folding of the Brooklyn Americans and ushered in an unprecedented era of franchise stability in the NHL, which lasted without any organizational changes for twenty-five seasons. Eventually, the six teams that competed in the league during this period would come to be known as the Original Six.

Original Six: 1942–43 to 1966–67 NHL teams
Boston Bruins
Chicago Black Hawks
Detroit Red Wings
Montreal Canadiens
New York Rangers
Toronto Maple Leafs

== 1967–1991: Expansion era ==
=== Twelve teams (1967–70) ===
The 1967 expansion doubled the number of teams in the league, with an upfront expansion fee of $2 million each ($19.3 million today). For the 1967–68 season, six new teams were added to the NHL: the California Seals, the Los Angeles Kings, the Minnesota North Stars, the Philadelphia Flyers, the Pittsburgh Penguins, and the St. Louis Blues.

Within a month into their first season, the California Seals became the Oakland Seals.

All Original Six teams were placed in the East Division
All 1967 expansion teams were placed in the West Division

1967–68 to 1969–70 NHL teams
East Division	West Division
Boston Bruins	Los Angeles Kings
Chicago Black Hawks	Minnesota North Stars
Detroit Red Wings	Oakland Seals
Montreal Canadiens	Philadelphia Flyers
New York Rangers	Pittsburgh Penguins
Toronto Maple Leafs	St. Louis Blues

=== Fourteen teams (1970–72) ===
The Oakland Seals were renamed the Bay Area Seals for two games before changing their name to the California Golden Seals for their fourth season in 1970–71. The same season the NHL added two new teams, the Buffalo Sabres and the Vancouver Canucks, paying an expansion fee of $6 million each ($49.7 million today). The Sabres and the Canucks were placed in the East (partially as an effort to provide greater balance between the divisions, and also so they would have rivalries with the other two Canadian teams), while the Chicago Black Hawks moved to the West.

1970–71 was the first season in the NHL *

1970–71 to 1971–72 NHL teams
East Division	West Division
Boston Bruins	California Golden Seals
Buffalo Sabres *	Chicago Black Hawks
Detroit Red Wings	Los Angeles Kings
Montreal Canadiens	Minnesota North Stars
New York Rangers	Philadelphia Flyers
Toronto Maple Leafs	Pittsburgh Penguins
Vancouver Canucks *	St. Louis Blues

=== Sixteen teams (1972–74) ===
Two more teams joined for the 1972–73 NHL season, the New York Islanders and the Atlanta Flames. With the competing World Hockey Association (WHA) starting that same season, the NHL was not able to raise its expansion fee from the price of two years earlier, $6 million ($46.2 million today), with the Islanders paying an additional $5 million ($38.5 million today) to the New York Rangers for infringing on their territory. The Islanders were placed in the East and the Flames were placed in the West.

1972–73 was the first season in the NHL *

1972–73 to 1973–74 NHL teams
East Division	West Division
Boston Bruins	Atlanta Flames *
Buffalo Sabres	California Golden Seals
Detroit Red Wings	Chicago Black Hawks
Montreal Canadiens	Los Angeles Kings
New York Islanders *	Minnesota North Stars
New York Rangers	Philadelphia Flyers
Toronto Maple Leafs	Pittsburgh Penguins
Vancouver Canucks	St. Louis Blues

=== Eighteen teams (1974–78) ===
Two more teams joined for the 1974–75 NHL season, the Washington Capitals and the Kansas City Scouts, but the ongoing competition from the WHA meant that the overall revenue stream of the NHL had not improved, so the league kept the expansion fee for new owners at the $6 million ($39.2 million today) of two years and four years earlier. The earnings situation for the new franchises was so poor that (at least) the Capitals were able to negotiate a reduction to a total fee of $2.85 million ($18.6 million today).

With 18 teams, the league realigned into four divisions and two conferences. The teams were mixed up regardless of North American geography, and thus the new conferences and divisions were not named after geographical references. The East Division became the Prince of Wales Conference and consisted of the Adams Division and Norris Division. The West Division became the Clarence Campbell Conference and consisted of the Patrick Division and Smythe Division.

1974–75 was the first season in the NHL *

1974–75 to 1975–76 NHL teams
Wales		Campbell	
Adams	Norris	Patrick	Smythe
Boston Bruins	Detroit Red Wings	Atlanta Flames	Chicago Black Hawks
Buffalo Sabres	Los Angeles Kings	New York Islanders	Kansas City Scouts *
California Golden Seals	Montreal Canadiens	New York Rangers	Minnesota North Stars
Toronto Maple Leafs	Pittsburgh Penguins	Philadelphia Flyers	St. Louis Blues
	Washington Capitals *		Vancouver Canucks

==== 1976: Two teams relocate ====
Going into the 1976–77 NHL season, the California Golden Seals relocated to become the Cleveland Barons, and the Kansas City Scouts moved to become the Colorado Rockies.

Dissolved after the 1977–78 season †

1976–77 to 1977–78 NHL teams
Wales		Campbell	
Adams	Norris	Patrick	Smythe
Boston Bruins	Detroit Red Wings	Atlanta Flames	Chicago Black Hawks
Buffalo Sabres	Los Angeles Kings	New York Islanders	Colorado Rockies
Cleveland Barons †	Montreal Canadiens	New York Rangers	Minnesota North Stars
Toronto Maple Leafs	Pittsburgh Penguins	Philadelphia Flyers	St. Louis Blues
	Washington Capitals		Vancouver Canucks

=== Seventeen teams (1978–79) ===
For the first time since the 1942–43 season, the NHL contracted, merging the Cleveland Barons into the Minnesota North Stars. The North Stars then took the Barons' place in the Adams Division.

1978–79 NHL teams
Wales		Campbell	
Adams	Norris	Patrick	Smythe
Boston Bruins	Detroit Red Wings	Atlanta Flames	Chicago Black Hawks
Buffalo Sabres	Los Angeles Kings	New York Islanders	Colorado Rockies
Minnesota North Stars	Montreal Canadiens	New York Rangers	St. Louis Blues
Toronto Maple Leafs	Pittsburgh Penguins	Philadelphia Flyers	Vancouver Canucks
	Washington Capitals		

=== Twenty-one teams (1979–91) ===
Following seven seasons of revenue draining competition, the NHL–WHA merger was completed for the start of the 1979–80 NHL season. Four teams came over from the WHA, paying an expansion fee of $7.5 million each ($33.3 million today). These new NHL teams were the Edmonton Oilers, Hartford Whalers, Quebec Nordiques, and the Winnipeg Jets. This also doubled the number of Canadian teams in the league. Standing at 21 teams for twelve seasons, this was one of the longer periods of league stability, though surpassed by twenty-five seasons of the Original Six, when no additions, moves, nor name changes occurred.

The Nordiques were placed in the Adams Division, the Whalers in the Norris, and the Oilers and the Jets in the Smythe. The Washington Capitals moved from the Norris to the Patrick Division. The divisions were effectively meaningless as all teams played a balanced schedule and each round of the playoffs was re-seeded by league point standings rather than divisional.

Teams from the WHA *

1979–80 NHL teams
Wales		Campbell	
Adams	Norris	Patrick	Smythe
Boston Bruins	Detroit Red Wings	Atlanta Flames	Chicago Black Hawks
Buffalo Sabres	Hartford Whalers *	New York Islanders	Colorado Rockies
Minnesota North Stars	Los Angeles Kings	New York Rangers	Edmonton Oilers *
Quebec Nordiques *	Montreal Canadiens	Philadelphia Flyers	St. Louis Blues
Toronto Maple Leafs	Pittsburgh Penguins	Washington Capitals	Vancouver Canucks
			Winnipeg Jets *

==== 1980: Flames relocate to Calgary ====
For the 1980–81 season, Atlanta relocated to become the Calgary Flames.

1980–81 NHL teams
Wales		Campbell	
Adams	Norris	Patrick	Smythe
Boston Bruins	Detroit Red Wings	Calgary Flames	Chicago Black Hawks
Buffalo Sabres	Hartford Whalers	New York Islanders	Colorado Rockies
Minnesota North Stars	Los Angeles Kings	New York Rangers	Edmonton Oilers
Quebec Nordiques	Montreal Canadiens	Philadelphia Flyers	St. Louis Blues
Toronto Maple Leafs	Pittsburgh Penguins	Washington Capitals	Vancouver Canucks
			Winnipeg Jets

==== 1981 realignment ====
For the 1981–82 season, the teams were realigned to reduce travel. Also, the Norris Division moved to the Campbell Conference and the Patrick Division moved to the Wales Conference.

1981–82 NHL teams
Wales		Campbell	
Adams	Patrick	Norris	Smythe
Boston Bruins	New York Islanders	Chicago Black Hawks	Calgary Flames
Buffalo Sabres	New York Rangers	Detroit Red Wings	Colorado Rockies
Hartford Whalers	Philadelphia Flyers	Minnesota North Stars	Edmonton Oilers
Montreal Canadiens	Pittsburgh Penguins	St. Louis Blues	Los Angeles Kings
Quebec Nordiques	Washington Capitals	Toronto Maple Leafs	Vancouver Canucks
		Winnipeg Jets	

==== 1982: Colorado relocates to New Jersey ====
For the 1982–83 season, the Colorado Rockies relocated to become the New Jersey Devils. The team was moved to the Patrick Division, while the Winnipeg Jets took their place in the Smythe Division.

1982–83 to 1985–86 NHL teams
Wales		Campbell	
Adams	Patrick	Norris	Smythe
Boston Bruins	New Jersey Devils	Chicago Black Hawks	Calgary Flames
Buffalo Sabres	New York Islanders	Detroit Red Wings	Edmonton Oilers
Hartford Whalers	New York Rangers	Minnesota North Stars	Los Angeles Kings
Montreal Canadiens	Philadelphia Flyers	St. Louis Blues	Vancouver Canucks
Quebec Nordiques	Pittsburgh Penguins	Toronto Maple Leafs	Winnipeg Jets
	Washington Capitals		

==== 1986: Chicago changes the spelling of its name ====
The Chicago Black Hawks changed their name to Chicago Blackhawks for the 1986–87 season.

1986–87 to 1990–91 NHL teams
Wales		Campbell	
Adams	Patrick	Norris	Smythe
Boston Bruins	New Jersey Devils	Chicago Blackhawks	Calgary Flames
Buffalo Sabres	New York Islanders	Detroit Red Wings	Edmonton Oilers
Hartford Whalers	New York Rangers	Minnesota North Stars	Los Angeles Kings
Montreal Canadiens	Philadelphia Flyers	St. Louis Blues	Vancouver Canucks
Quebec Nordiques	Pittsburgh Penguins	Toronto Maple Leafs	Winnipeg Jets
	Washington Capitals		

== 1991–2017: Further expansion and realignment ==
In 1990, the owners developed a plan to expand the NHL to 28 teams within a decade. The plan was enacted, creating ten years of rapid expansion and relocation in the NHL. While the pace of expansion and relocation slowed after the 1999–2000 season, growth and change continued to be a normal development.

=== Twenty-two teams (1991–92) ===
The 1991–92 season saw the addition of the San Jose Sharks, paying an expansion fee of $45 million ($106.4 million today). The Sharks were placed in the Smythe Division with the other West Coast teams.

1991–92 was the first season in the NHL *

1991–92 NHL teams
Wales		Campbell	
Adams	Patrick	Norris	Smythe
Boston Bruins	New Jersey Devils	Chicago Blackhawks	Calgary Flames
Buffalo Sabres	New York Islanders	Detroit Red Wings	Edmonton Oilers
Hartford Whalers	New York Rangers	Minnesota North Stars	Los Angeles Kings
Montreal Canadiens	Philadelphia Flyers	St. Louis Blues	San Jose Sharks *
Quebec Nordiques	Pittsburgh Penguins	Toronto Maple Leafs	Vancouver Canucks
	Washington Capitals		Winnipeg Jets

=== Twenty-four teams (1992–93) ===
Two new teams joined the league the following season, the Ottawa Senators and the Tampa Bay Lightning, paying an expansion fee of $45 million each ($103.2 million today). The Senators were placed in the Adams Division, and the Lightning in the Norris, so all four divisions would have six teams each.

1992–93 was the first season in the NHL *

1992–93 NHL teams
Wales		Campbell	
Adams	Patrick	Norris	Smythe
Boston Bruins	New Jersey Devils	Chicago Blackhawks	Calgary Flames
Buffalo Sabres	New York Islanders	Detroit Red Wings	Edmonton Oilers
Hartford Whalers	New York Rangers	Minnesota North Stars	Los Angeles Kings
Montreal Canadiens	Philadelphia Flyers	St. Louis Blues	San Jose Sharks
Ottawa Senators *	Pittsburgh Penguins	Tampa Bay Lightning *	Vancouver Canucks
Quebec Nordiques	Washington Capitals	Toronto Maple Leafs	Winnipeg Jets

=== Twenty-six teams (1993–98) ===
The next season, another two teams were added, the Florida Panthers and the Mighty Ducks of Anaheim, paying an expansion fee of $50 million each ($111.4 million today), with Anaheim paying an additional $25 million ($55.7 million today) to the Los Angeles Kings for infringing on their region. The Minnesota North Stars relocated, becoming the Dallas Stars.

The league changed the conference names from Wales and Campbell to Eastern and Western, respectively, and changed the division names from Adams, Patrick, Norris, and Smythe to Northeast, Atlantic, Central, and Pacific, respectively.

Finally, the league realigned several teams. With the expansion Mighty Ducks joining the Pacific Division in the Western Conference, the Winnipeg Jets left the Pacific for the Central, the Tampa Bay Lightning left the Central Division and Western Conference for the Atlantic and the Eastern, respectively, and the Pittsburgh Penguins left the Atlantic Division for the Northeast to make room for the expansion Florida Panthers.

1993–94 was the first season in the NHL *

1993–94 to 1994–95 NHL teams
Eastern		Western	
Northeast	Atlantic	Central	Pacific
Boston Bruins	Florida Panthers *	Chicago Blackhawks	Mighty Ducks of Anaheim *
Buffalo Sabres	New Jersey Devils	Dallas Stars	Calgary Flames
Hartford Whalers	New York Islanders	Detroit Red Wings	Edmonton Oilers
Montreal Canadiens	New York Rangers	St. Louis Blues	Los Angeles Kings
Ottawa Senators	Philadelphia Flyers	Toronto Maple Leafs	San Jose Sharks
Pittsburgh Penguins	Tampa Bay Lightning	Winnipeg Jets	Vancouver Canucks
Quebec Nordiques	Washington Capitals		

==== 1995: Nordiques relocate to Colorado ====
For the 1995–96 season, the Quebec Nordiques relocated to become the Colorado Avalanche. The team also switched conferences, moving from the Northeast Division in the East to the Pacific Division in the West.

1995–96 NHL teams
Eastern		Western	
Atlantic	Northeast	Central	Pacific
Florida Panthers	Boston Bruins	Chicago Blackhawks	Mighty Ducks of Anaheim
New Jersey Devils	Buffalo Sabres	Dallas Stars	Calgary Flames
New York Islanders	Hartford Whalers	Detroit Red Wings	Colorado Avalanche
New York Rangers	Montreal Canadiens	St. Louis Blues	Edmonton Oilers
Philadelphia Flyers	Ottawa Senators	Toronto Maple Leafs	Los Angeles Kings
Tampa Bay Lightning	Pittsburgh Penguins	Winnipeg Jets	San Jose Sharks
Washington Capitals			Vancouver Canucks

==== 1996: Jets deactivated, league expands to Phoenix ====
For the 1996–97 season, the Winnipeg Jets were deactivated, and the team's assets were relocated to become the Phoenix Coyotes. The team remained in the Central Division.

1996–97 NHL teams
Eastern		Western	
Atlantic	Northeast	Central	Pacific
Florida Panthers	Boston Bruins	Chicago Blackhawks	Mighty Ducks of Anaheim
New Jersey Devils	Buffalo Sabres	Dallas Stars	Calgary Flames
New York Islanders	Hartford Whalers	Detroit Red Wings	Colorado Avalanche
New York Rangers	Montreal Canadiens	Phoenix Coyotes	Edmonton Oilers
Philadelphia Flyers	Ottawa Senators	St. Louis Blues	Los Angeles Kings
Tampa Bay Lightning	Pittsburgh Penguins	Toronto Maple Leafs	San Jose Sharks
Washington Capitals			Vancouver Canucks

==== 1997: Whalers relocate to North Carolina ====
For the 1997–98 season, the Hartford Whalers relocated to become the Carolina Hurricanes. The team remained in the Northeast Division.

1997–98 NHL teams
Eastern		Western	
Atlantic	Northeast	Central	Pacific
Florida Panthers	Boston Bruins	Chicago Blackhawks	Mighty Ducks of Anaheim
New Jersey Devils	Buffalo Sabres	Dallas Stars	Calgary Flames
New York Islanders	Carolina Hurricanes	Detroit Red Wings	Colorado Avalanche
New York Rangers	Montreal Canadiens	Phoenix Coyotes	Edmonton Oilers
Philadelphia Flyers	Ottawa Senators	St. Louis Blues	Los Angeles Kings
Tampa Bay Lightning	Pittsburgh Penguins	Toronto Maple Leafs	San Jose Sharks
Washington Capitals			Vancouver Canucks

=== Twenty-seven teams (1998–99) ===
The Nashville Predators joined the league for the 1998–99 season, paying an expansion fee of $80 million ($158 million today). The league also realigned to a strictly geographic six-division structure, with three per conference. The Eastern Conference had the Atlantic, Northeast, and Southeast divisions, while the Western Conference had the Central, Northwest, and Pacific divisions. The expansion Predators were placed in the Central Division. The Toronto Maple Leafs were the only team to switch conferences, moving from the Western and the Central Division to the Eastern and the Northeast Division, rejoining classic East Division and Adams Division rivals for the first time since the respective 1973–74 and 1980–81 seasons.

1998–99 was the first season in the NHL *

1998–99 NHL teams
Eastern	Atlantic	Northeast	Southeast
Eastern	New Jersey Devils	Boston Bruins	Carolina Hurricanes
Eastern	New York Islanders	Buffalo Sabres	Florida Panthers
Eastern	New York Rangers	Montreal Canadiens	Tampa Bay Lightning
Eastern	Philadelphia Flyers	Ottawa Senators	Washington Capitals
Eastern	Pittsburgh Penguins	Toronto Maple Leafs	
Western	Central	Northwest	Pacific
Western	Chicago Blackhawks	Calgary Flames	Mighty Ducks of Anaheim
Western	Detroit Red Wings	Colorado Avalanche	Dallas Stars
Western	Nashville Predators *	Edmonton Oilers	Los Angeles Kings
Western	St. Louis Blues	Vancouver Canucks	Phoenix Coyotes
Western			San Jose Sharks

=== Twenty-eight teams (1999–2000) ===
The 1999–2000 season saw another team start play, the Atlanta Thrashers, paying the same expansion fee of $80 million ($154.6 million today) as the Predators a year earlier. The Thrashers were placed in the Southeast Division.

On September 24, 2026, the Thrashers' franchise records were consolidated with the original Jets' NHL franchise records from 1979 to 1996. As a result, the Thrashers were retconned as reactivation of the Jets franchise which was inactive from 1996 to 1999.

1999–2000 was the first season in the NHL *

1999–2000 NHL teams
Eastern	Atlantic	Northeast	Southeast
Eastern	New Jersey Devils	Boston Bruins	Atlanta Thrashers *
Eastern	New York Islanders	Buffalo Sabres	Carolina Hurricanes
Eastern	New York Rangers	Montreal Canadiens	Florida Panthers
Eastern	Philadelphia Flyers	Ottawa Senators	Tampa Bay Lightning
Eastern	Pittsburgh Penguins	Toronto Maple Leafs	Washington Capitals
Western	Central	Northwest	Pacific
Western	Chicago Blackhawks	Calgary Flames	Mighty Ducks of Anaheim
Western	Detroit Red Wings	Colorado Avalanche	Dallas Stars
Western	Nashville Predators	Edmonton Oilers	Los Angeles Kings
Western	St. Louis Blues	Vancouver Canucks	Phoenix Coyotes
Western			San Jose Sharks

=== Thirty teams (2000–2017) ===
For its 2000–01 season, the NHL added the Columbus Blue Jackets and the Minnesota Wild, each paying the same expansion fee of $80 million ($151 million today) as Nashville and Atlanta in the previous two years. The Blue Jackets were placed in the Central Division and the Wild in the Northwest so that all six divisions would each have five teams.

For the next 17 seasons, the NHL maintained 30 teams, the second longest period of membership stability in its history, the first being the Original Six.

2000–01 was the first season in the NHL *

2000–01 to 2005–06 NHL teams
Eastern	Atlantic	Northeast	Southeast
Eastern	New Jersey Devils	Boston Bruins	Atlanta Thrashers
Eastern	New York Islanders	Buffalo Sabres	Carolina Hurricanes
Eastern	New York Rangers	Montreal Canadiens	Florida Panthers
Eastern	Philadelphia Flyers	Ottawa Senators	Tampa Bay Lightning
Eastern	Pittsburgh Penguins	Toronto Maple Leafs	Washington Capitals
Western	Central	Northwest	Pacific
Western	Chicago Blackhawks	Calgary Flames	Mighty Ducks of Anaheim
Western	Columbus Blue Jackets *	Colorado Avalanche	Dallas Stars
Western	Detroit Red Wings	Edmonton Oilers	Los Angeles Kings
Western	Nashville Predators	Minnesota Wild *	Phoenix Coyotes
Western	St. Louis Blues	Vancouver Canucks	San Jose Sharks

==== 2006: Anaheim shortens its name ====
The Mighty Ducks of Anaheim changed their name to the Anaheim Ducks in the 2006–07 season. The newly renamed Ducks would win the Stanley Cup that season.

2006–07 to 2010–11 NHL teams
Eastern	Atlantic	Northeast	Southeast
Eastern	New Jersey Devils	Boston Bruins	Atlanta Thrashers
Eastern	New York Islanders	Buffalo Sabres	Carolina Hurricanes
Eastern	New York Rangers	Montreal Canadiens	Florida Panthers
Eastern	Philadelphia Flyers	Ottawa Senators	Tampa Bay Lightning
Eastern	Pittsburgh Penguins	Toronto Maple Leafs	Washington Capitals
Western	Central	Northwest	Pacific
Western	Chicago Blackhawks	Calgary Flames	Anaheim Ducks
Western	Columbus Blue Jackets	Colorado Avalanche	Dallas Stars
Western	Detroit Red Wings	Edmonton Oilers	Los Angeles Kings
Western	Nashville Predators	Minnesota Wild	Phoenix Coyotes
Western	St. Louis Blues	Vancouver Canucks	San Jose Sharks

==== 2011: Thrashers relocate to Winnipeg ====
The Atlanta Thrashers relocated to Winnipeg, Manitoba, becoming the second version of the Winnipeg Jets, beginning in the 2011–12 season. The team remained in the Southeast Division.

2011–12 to 2012–13 NHL teams
Eastern	Atlantic	Northeast	Southeast
Eastern	New Jersey Devils	Boston Bruins	Carolina Hurricanes
Eastern	New York Islanders	Buffalo Sabres	Florida Panthers
Eastern	New York Rangers	Montreal Canadiens	Tampa Bay Lightning
Eastern	Philadelphia Flyers	Ottawa Senators	Washington Capitals
Eastern	Pittsburgh Penguins	Toronto Maple Leafs	Winnipeg Jets
Western	Central	Northwest	Pacific
Western	Chicago Blackhawks	Calgary Flames	Anaheim Ducks
Western	Columbus Blue Jackets	Colorado Avalanche	Dallas Stars
Western	Detroit Red Wings	Edmonton Oilers	Los Angeles Kings
Western	Nashville Predators	Minnesota Wild	Phoenix Coyotes
Western	St. Louis Blues	Vancouver Canucks	San Jose Sharks

==== 2013 realignment ====
The 2011 relocation of the former Atlanta Thrashers franchise to the Winnipeg Jets prompted the league to discuss realignment. However, disagreement between the NHL Board of Governors and the National Hockey League Players' Association (NHLPA) caused it to be pushed to 2013.

On December 5, 2011, the NHL Board of Governors originally approved a conference realignment plan to move from a six-division setup to a four-conference structure. However, on January 6, 2012, the National Hockey League Players' Association (NHLPA) rejected that proposed realignment. A new joint NHL-NHLPA plan was proposed in February 2013 as a modification of the previous plan with both the Columbus Blue Jackets and Detroit Red Wings moving to the East and the Winnipeg Jets moving to the West. The NHLPA officially gave its consent to the NHL's proposed plan on March 7, and then the NHL's Board of Governors approved the realignment on March 14, to be implemented prior to the 2013–14 season. The league then announced the names of the divisions on July 19: the two eight-team divisions in the Eastern Conference would be the Atlantic Division and the Metropolitan Division, and the two seven-team divisions in the Western Conference would be the Central Division and the Pacific Division.

2013–14 NHL teams
Eastern		Western	
Atlantic	Metropolitan	Central	Pacific
Boston Bruins	Carolina Hurricanes	Chicago Blackhawks	Anaheim Ducks
Buffalo Sabres	Columbus Blue Jackets	Colorado Avalanche	Calgary Flames
Detroit Red Wings	New Jersey Devils	Dallas Stars	Edmonton Oilers
Florida Panthers	New York Islanders	Minnesota Wild	Los Angeles Kings
Montreal Canadiens	New York Rangers	Nashville Predators	Phoenix Coyotes
Ottawa Senators	Philadelphia Flyers	St. Louis Blues	San Jose Sharks
Tampa Bay Lightning	Pittsburgh Penguins	Winnipeg Jets	Vancouver Canucks
Toronto Maple Leafs	Washington Capitals		

==== 2014: Coyotes change their name ====
The Phoenix Coyotes changed their name to Arizona Coyotes for the 2014–15 season.

2014–15 to 2016–17 NHL teams
Eastern		Western	
Atlantic	Metropolitan	Central	Pacific
Boston Bruins	Carolina Hurricanes	Chicago Blackhawks	Anaheim Ducks
Buffalo Sabres	Columbus Blue Jackets	Colorado Avalanche	Arizona Coyotes
Detroit Red Wings	New Jersey Devils	Dallas Stars	Calgary Flames
Florida Panthers	New York Islanders	Minnesota Wild	Edmonton Oilers
Montreal Canadiens	New York Rangers	Nashville Predators	Los Angeles Kings
Ottawa Senators	Philadelphia Flyers	St. Louis Blues	San Jose Sharks
Tampa Bay Lightning	Pittsburgh Penguins	Winnipeg Jets	Vancouver Canucks
Toronto Maple Leafs	Washington Capitals		

== 2017–present: Second century ==
The league began its second century in 2017 and has continued to grow by adding the Vegas Golden Knights, Seattle Kraken, and Utah Mammoth. However, it has also seen the Arizona Coyotes indefinitely suspend operations following the 2023–24 season, with the team's hockey assets, including its roster and coaches, being transferred to the newly-founded Utah franchise.

=== Thirty-one teams (2017–2021) ===
On June 22, 2016, the Board of Governors voted 30–0 to add an expansion franchise in Las Vegas for the 2017–18 season, charging an expansion fee of $500 million ($670.8 million today). The Vegas Golden Knights joined the Pacific Division of the Western Conference.

2017–18 was the first season in the NHL *

2017–18 to 2019–20 NHL teams
Eastern		Western	
Atlantic	Metropolitan	Central	Pacific
Boston Bruins	Carolina Hurricanes	Chicago Blackhawks	Anaheim Ducks
Buffalo Sabres	Columbus Blue Jackets	Colorado Avalanche	Arizona Coyotes
Detroit Red Wings	New Jersey Devils	Dallas Stars	Calgary Flames
Florida Panthers	New York Islanders	Minnesota Wild	Edmonton Oilers
Montreal Canadiens	New York Rangers	Nashville Predators	Los Angeles Kings
Ottawa Senators	Philadelphia Flyers	St. Louis Blues	San Jose Sharks
Tampa Bay Lightning	Pittsburgh Penguins	Winnipeg Jets	Vancouver Canucks
Toronto Maple Leafs	Washington Capitals		Vegas Golden Knights *

==== 2020–21: COVID-19 pandemic ====
Due to the COVID-19 pandemic, which delayed the conclusion of the 2019–20 season and delayed and shortened the 2020–21 season, the NHL adopted a temporary divisional alignment for 2020–21. The primary considerations acknowledged by the league were the ongoing restrictions and quarantine requirements affecting the ability of its teams to cross the Canada–United States border. As a result, on December 20, 2020, the league announced it had temporarily suspended the Eastern and Western Conferences and realigned to four non-conference divisions: North, East, Central, and West. The North Division consisted of all seven Canadian teams and was the first all-Canadian division since the league first expanded into the United States in 1924. The regular season lasted 56 games and consisted solely of intra-divisional play.

2020–21 NHL teams
North	East	Central	West
Calgary Flames	Boston Bruins	Carolina Hurricanes	Anaheim Ducks
Edmonton Oilers	Buffalo Sabres	Chicago Blackhawks	Arizona Coyotes
Montreal Canadiens	New Jersey Devils	Columbus Blue Jackets	Colorado Avalanche
Ottawa Senators	New York Islanders	Dallas Stars	Los Angeles Kings
Toronto Maple Leafs	New York Rangers	Detroit Red Wings	Minnesota Wild
Vancouver Canucks	Philadelphia Flyers	Florida Panthers	St. Louis Blues
Winnipeg Jets	Pittsburgh Penguins	Nashville Predators	San Jose Sharks
	Washington Capitals	Tampa Bay Lightning	Vegas Golden Knights

=== Original Thirty-Two era (2021–present) ===
On December 4, 2018, Seattle was announced as the location of a thirty-second franchise to begin play in the 2021–22 season, with an expansion fee of $650 million. The league reverted to its pre-COVID-19 divisions in 2021. Under the realignment of those divisions that was announced prior to the pandemic, the expansion Seattle Kraken were placed in the Pacific Division, while the Arizona Coyotes returned to the Central Division.

2021–22 was the first season in the NHL *	2023–24 was the last season in the NHL †

2021–22 to 2023–24 NHL teams
Eastern		Western	
Atlantic	Metropolitan	Central	Pacific
Boston Bruins	Carolina Hurricanes	Arizona Coyotes †	Anaheim Ducks
Buffalo Sabres	Columbus Blue Jackets	Chicago Blackhawks	Calgary Flames
Detroit Red Wings	New Jersey Devils	Colorado Avalanche	Edmonton Oilers
Florida Panthers	New York Islanders	Dallas Stars	Los Angeles Kings
Montreal Canadiens	New York Rangers	Minnesota Wild	San Jose Sharks
Ottawa Senators	Philadelphia Flyers	Nashville Predators	Seattle Kraken *
Tampa Bay Lightning	Pittsburgh Penguins	St. Louis Blues	Vancouver Canucks
Toronto Maple Leafs	Washington Capitals	Winnipeg Jets	Vegas Golden Knights

==== 2024: League expands to Utah, Coyotes suspend operations ====
On April 18, 2024, the Arizona Coyotes franchise was deactivated, and its players and personnel were transferred to the Utah Hockey Club. Under the original conditions, the Coyotes franchise would have been reactivated if a suitable arena was built in Arizona by 2029. After the Arizona State Land Department cancelled a June 2024 auction for a parcel of land that Coyotes owner Alex Meruelo intended to purchase as a site for a new arena, he relinquished his rights as the team's owner on July 10. As of July 2024, the league has not yet indicated whether the Arizona franchise will now fold outright, hold the rights to the Coyotes and wait for a potential expansion team, or whether its history, records and intellectual property will be transferred to the Utah Hockey Club or split between Utah and the current Winnipeg Jets.

2024–25 was the first season in the NHL *

2024–25 NHL teams
Eastern		Western	
Atlantic	Metropolitan	Central	Pacific
Boston Bruins	Carolina Hurricanes	Chicago Blackhawks	Anaheim Ducks
Buffalo Sabres	Columbus Blue Jackets	Colorado Avalanche	Calgary Flames
Detroit Red Wings	New Jersey Devils	Dallas Stars	Edmonton Oilers
Florida Panthers	New York Islanders	Minnesota Wild	Los Angeles Kings
Montreal Canadiens	New York Rangers	Nashville Predators	San Jose Sharks
Ottawa Senators	Philadelphia Flyers	St. Louis Blues	Seattle Kraken
Tampa Bay Lightning	Pittsburgh Penguins	Utah Hockey Club *	Vancouver Canucks
Toronto Maple Leafs	Washington Capitals	Winnipeg Jets	Vegas Golden Knights

==== 2025: Utah changes its name ====
The temporarily named Utah Hockey Club changed its name to the Utah Mammoth for the 2025–26 season.

On September 24, 2026, the Winnipeg Jets consolidated its current franchise records from 1999 to present day with the original Jets' NHL franchise records from 1979 to 1996. As a result, the Jets were retconned as an inactive franchise from 1996 to 1999, and were reactivated as the Atlanta Thrashers in 1999.

2025–26 NHL teams
Eastern		Western	
Atlantic	Metropolitan	Central	Pacific
Boston Bruins	Carolina Hurricanes	Chicago Blackhawks	Anaheim Ducks
Buffalo Sabres	Columbus Blue Jackets	Colorado Avalanche	Calgary Flames
Detroit Red Wings	New Jersey Devils	Dallas Stars	Edmonton Oilers
Florida Panthers	New York Islanders	Minnesota Wild	Los Angeles Kings
Montreal Canadiens	New York Rangers	Nashville Predators	San Jose Sharks
Ottawa Senators	Philadelphia Flyers	St. Louis Blues	Seattle Kraken
Tampa Bay Lightning	Pittsburgh Penguins	Utah Mammoth	Vancouver Canucks
Toronto Maple Leafs	Washington Capitals	Winnipeg Jets	Vegas Golden Knights

== Expansion and dispersal drafts ==
Draft	Location	City	Date	Expansion team(s) (in 1st round order)	Players drafted	#1 pick (team the player was taken from)
1967	Queen Elizabeth Hotel	Montreal, Quebec	June 6, 1967	Los Angeles Kings, Philadelphia Flyers, St. Louis Blues, Minnesota North Stars, Pittsburgh Penguins, California Seals	120	Terry Sawchuk (Toronto Maple Leafs)
1970	—N/a	—N/a	June 10, 1970	Buffalo Sabres, Vancouver Canucks	40	Tom Webster (Boston Bruins)
1972	—N/a	—N/a	June 6, 1972	Atlanta Flames, New York Islanders	42	Phil Myre (Montreal Canadiens)
1974	—N/a	—N/a	June 12, 1974	Kansas City Scouts, Washington Capitals	48	Michel Plasse (Montreal Canadiens)
1978 (dispersal)	—N/a	—N/a	June 15, 1978	merger of Cleveland Barons, Minnesota North Stars	2	St. Louis Blues picked Mike Crombeen away from the merged team
1979	—N/a	—N/a	June 13, 1979	Hartford Whalers, Winnipeg Jets, Quebec Nordiques, Edmonton Oilers	65	Alan Hangsleben (Montreal Canadiens)
1991 (dispersal, then expansion)	—N/a	—N/a	May 30, 1991	San Jose Sharks, Minnesota North Stars	44	Dispersal: San Jose submitted a list of 14 players they would take from the existing Minnesota roster Expansion: San Jose took Jeff Hackett (New York Islanders)
1992	—N/a	—N/a	June 18, 1992	Ottawa Senators, Tampa Bay Lightning	42	Peter Sidorkiewicz (Hartford Whalers)
1993	Quebec Coliseum	Quebec City, Quebec	June 24–25, 1993	Florida Panthers, Mighty Ducks of Anaheim	51	John Vanbiesbrouck (Vancouver Canucks)
1998	Marine Midland Arena	Buffalo, New York	June 26, 1998	Nashville Predators	26	No true "first pick", as Nashville simply chose one player from each of the 26 teams.
1999	FleetCenter	Boston, Massachusetts	June 25, 1999	Atlanta Thrashers	26	No true "first pick", as Atlanta simply chose one player from each of the 26 teams (Nashville Predators were excluded).
2000	Pengrowth Saddledome	Calgary, Alberta	June 23, 2000	Columbus Blue Jackets, Minnesota Wild	52	Rick Tabaracci (Colorado Avalanche)
2017	T-Mobile Arena	Paradise, Nevada	June 21, 2017	Vegas Golden Knights	30	No true "first pick", as Vegas simply chose one player from each of the 30 teams.
2021	Gas Works Park	Seattle, Washington	July 21, 2021	Seattle Kraken	30	No true "first pick", as Seattle simply chose one player from each of the 30 teams (Vegas Golden Knights were excluded).

== Potential future expansion ==
After the 2000–01 season, when the NHL completed its 1990 plan to grow to 30 teams, the league made statements to the effect that no further expansion or even relocation was planned for the foreseeable future. As shown above, no changes occurred until a relocation in the 2011–12 season, followed by semi-regular growth and change.

There have been rumors and talks of potential new sites for existing or new teams in various locations in the United States and Canada, including Atlanta, Cincinnati, Cleveland, Hartford, Houston, Kansas City, Milwaukee, Oklahoma City, Omaha, Phoenix, Portland (Oregon), Quebec City, San Diego, Saskatoon, and a second Southern Ontario team (although the league has actively blocked all of the Southern Ontario efforts to date, including in Hamilton, citing territorial concerns with the Buffalo Sabres and Toronto Maple Leafs).

== See also ==
- History of the National Hockey League
- List of defunct and relocated National Hockey League teams
