= Goals against average =

Goalkeeping statistic used by several sports

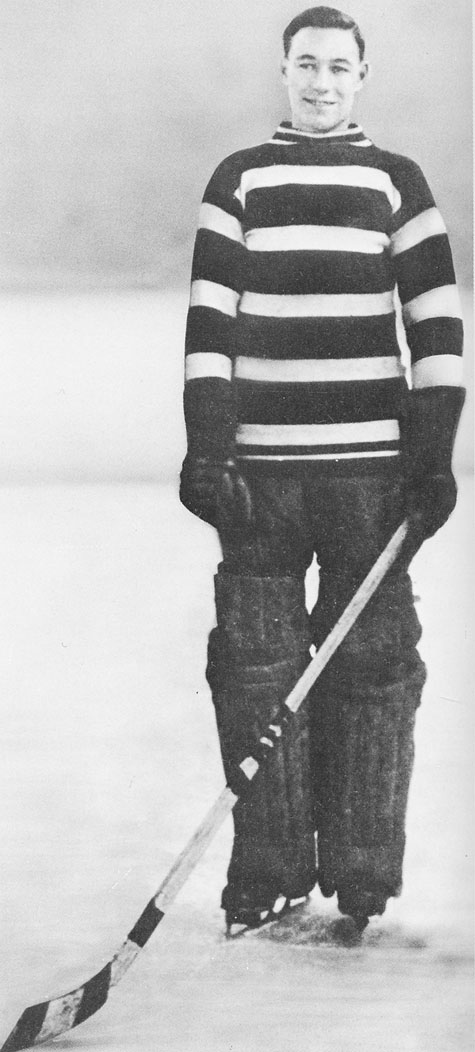
Clint Benedict, a goaltender of the 1920s in the NHL, holds several GAA records.

Goals against average (GAA), also known as average goals against (AGA), is a statistic used in field hockey, ice hockey, lacrosse, soccer, and water polo that is the mean of goals allowed per game by a goaltender or goalkeeper (depending on sport). GAA is analogous to a baseball pitcher's earned run average (ERA). In Japanese, the same translation (防御率) is used for both GAA and ERA, because of this.

For ice hockey, the goals against average statistic is the number of goals a goaltender allows per 60 minutes of playing time. It is calculated by taking the number of goals against, multiplying that by 60 (minutes) and then dividing by the number of minutes played. The modification has been used by the National Hockey League (NHL) since 1965, the International Ice Hockey Federation (IIHF) since 1990 & Professional Women's Hockey League (PWHL) since 2024. When calculating GAA, overtime goals and time on ice are included, whereas empty net and shootout goals are not. It is typically given to two decimal places.

The top goaltenders in the NHL have a GAA of about 1.85–2.10; however, this has not been seen since the Dead Puck Era. Although, the measure of a good GAA changes as different playing styles come and go. The top goaltenders in the National Lacrosse League, however, have a GAA of about 10.00, and the top 2005 Western Lacrosse Association goaltenders had a GAA of about 9.00. At their best, elite NCAA water polo goalies have a GAA between 3.00 and 5.00.

Since the statistic is highly dependent on the team playing in front of a goalie, save percentage is usually considered a more accurate measure of a goaltender's skill, especially in ice hockey and lacrosse, as it takes into account the number of shots the goaltender has faced. For example, in hockey, a goaltender saving 83% of shots, but allowing a 2.00 GAA would be considered worse than a goalie who saves 96% of shots, and has a 4.00 GAA. In soccer, since it is considered a part of the goalkeeper's job to coach defenders on proper positioning to prevent opponents' shots, GAA is more commonly used to evaluate goalkeepers than save percentage.
