= History of the National Hockey League (1992–2017) =

The Washington Capitals and the Pittsburgh Penguins in Game Seven of the second round of the 2017 Stanley Cup playoffs.

The National Hockey League (NHL) endured a tumultuous period of history between 1992 and 2017. It grew from 22 teams at the start of this period to 30 at the end, as the league expanded across the United States. Repeated labour conflicts interrupted play in 1992, 1994–95, 2004–05 and 2012–13; the second lockout caused the entire 2004–05 NHL season to be canceled, the first time in North American history that a sports league has canceled an entire season in a labour dispute. Nine franchises were added between 1991 and 2000, comprising the San Jose Sharks, Ottawa Senators, Tampa Bay Lightning, Florida Panthers, Mighty Ducks of Anaheim, Nashville Predators, Atlanta Thrashers, Columbus Blue Jackets and the Minnesota Wild. In addition to expansion teams, five franchises have relocated during this time: the Minnesota North Stars became the Dallas Stars (1993), the Quebec Nordiques became the Colorado Avalanche (1995), the Winnipeg Jets became the Phoenix Coyotes (1996), the Hartford Whalers became the Carolina Hurricanes (1997), and the Atlanta Thrashers became the second franchise known as the Winnipeg Jets (2011). In 1999, Wayne Gretzky retired from hockey.

Internationally, the Canada Cup gave way to the World Cup of Hockey in 1996, while NHL players first competed in the 1998 Winter Olympics. To promote itself worldwide, the NHL played regular season games in Japan in 1996, and throughout Europe since 2007. The league played its first outdoor regular season game between the Canadiens and the host Edmonton Oilers in 2003 and which led to the creation of three series of outdoor games: the Heritage Classic, Winter Classic and Stadium Series.

Increased use of defence-focused systems contributed to decreased scoring in the late 1990s, leading some to argue that the NHL's talent pool had been diluted by the 1990 expansion plan. The league has attempted several times to alter its rules to increase scoring. It began awarding teams a single point for losing in overtime in 1999, hoping to reduce the number of tie games. In 2005, ties were eliminated altogether as the penalty shootout was introduced to ensure that all games have a winner.

== Background ==
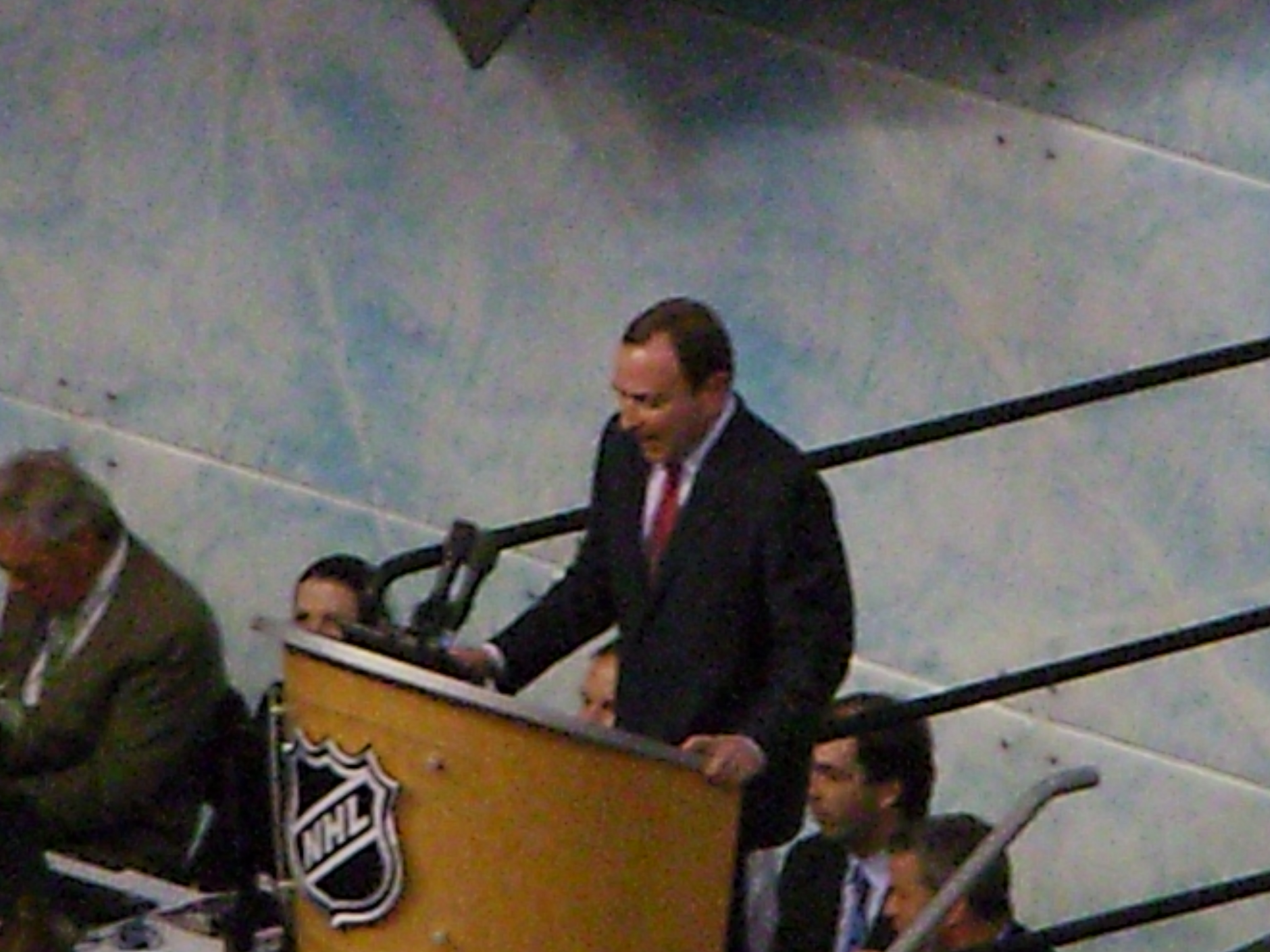
Gary Bettman, pictured in 2008, joined the NHL as its first commissioner in 1993.

As the 1990s began, players were uneasy with the closeness between National Hockey League Players' Association (NHLPA) executive director Alan Eagleson and the teams' owners. As a result, Eagleson stepped down in December 1991, and was replaced by Bob Goodenow. Four years later, the Federal Bureau of Investigation indicted Eagleson on charges of racketeering, fraud, embezzlement, kickbacks and obstruction of justice over allegations that he stole millions of dollars from the NHLPA. Eagleson pleaded guilty in 1998 in a plea bargain and was fined US$1 million and sentenced to 18 months in prison. He subsequently resigned from the Hockey Hall of Fame.

Four months after replacing Eagleson, Goodenow and the NHLPA launched the first NHL strike on April 1, 1992. It lasted ten days and resulted in the players receiving larger playoff bonuses, increased control over the licensing of their likenesses and improved rights to free agency; all canceled games were also rescheduled. It also led the owners to dismiss league president John Ziegler and replace him on an interim basis with Gil Stein. Goodenow called the strike a major moment, stating "I don't think the owners took the players seriously and it wasn't until the strike that they understood the players were serious." As part of the deal, the league also agreed to have each team play two games per season for the following two years in neutral site locations, partially to help gauge markets for potential expansion.

Desiring a fresh start, Gary Bettman was installed in February 1993. Formerly a senior vice president of the National Basketball Association, Bettman became the first commissioner. He was given the task of selling the game to the American market, ending labor unrest, completing expansion plans, and modernizing the league.

== Expansion ==
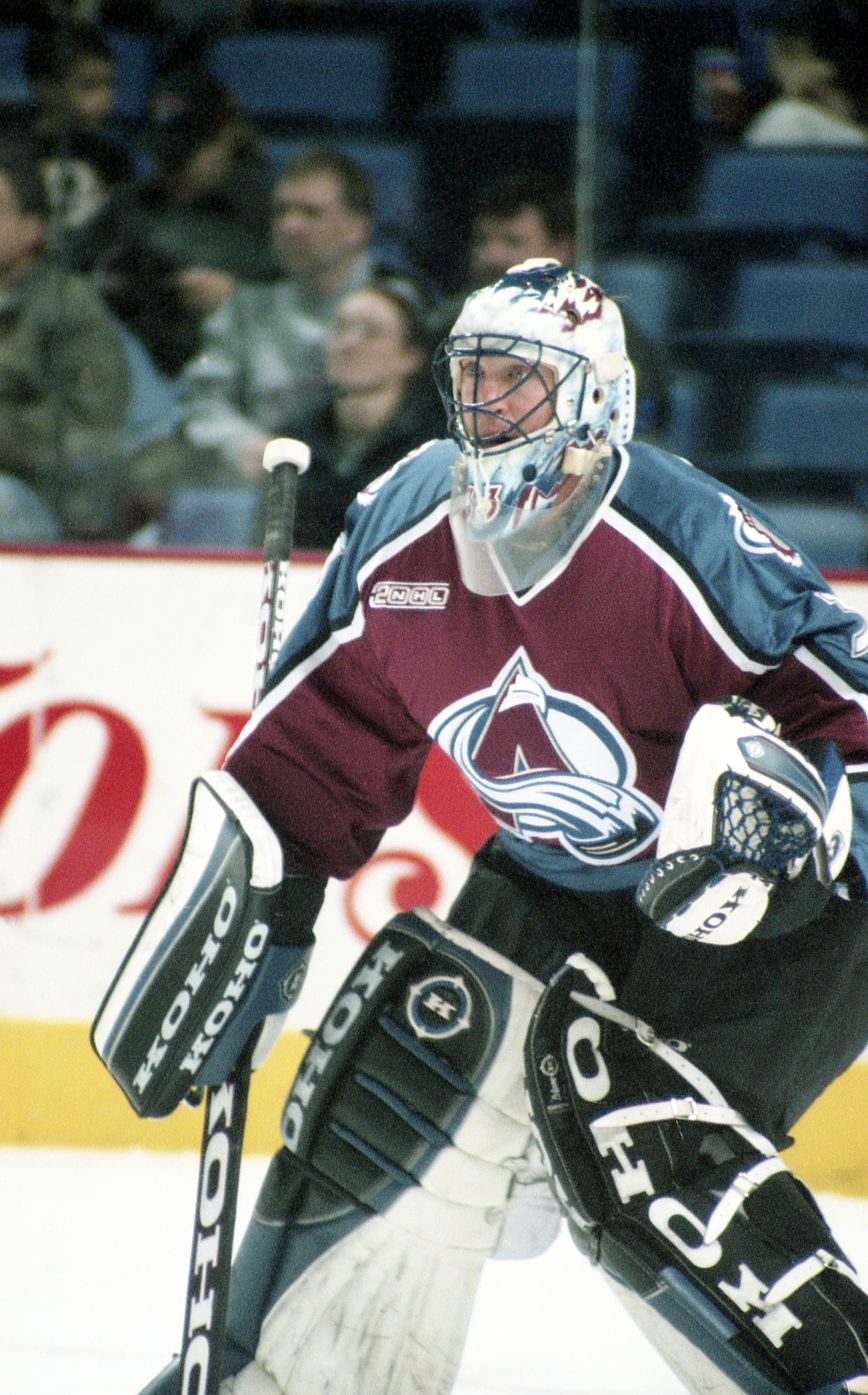
The acquisition of Patrick Roy helped lead the Colorado Avalanche to a Stanley Cup championship in 1996.

The Tampa Bay Lightning and Ottawa Senators joined the league in 1992–93 as part of the owners' 1990 plan to expand the NHL to 28 teams within a decade. The Lightning made NHL history when goaltender Manon Rhéaume played a period of an exhibition game for them on September 23, 1992. Rhéaume became the first woman to play in an NHL game. She also became the first woman to sign a professional hockey contract, doing so with the Lightning's farm team, the Atlanta Knights. One year later, the Mighty Ducks of Anaheim and Florida Panthers began play as the NHL's 25th and 26th franchises. They were established as part of the NHL's attempt to regain a U.S. network television presence by expanding into southern North America. The league expected that bringing in Blockbuster Video's Wayne Huizenga to own the Panthers, and The Walt Disney Company to own the Mighty Ducks would raise its profile. The NHL's southward push continued in 1993 when the Minnesota North Stars moved to Dallas, Texas to become the Dallas Stars.

The NHL celebrated the 100th anniversary of the Stanley Cup in 1993. That year's finals featured Patrick Roy and the Montreal Canadiens against Wayne Gretzky and the Los Angeles Kings. After losing the first game, the Canadiens rallied from a late deficit to win game two in overtime after the Kings' Marty McSorley was penalized for using an illegal stick. Montreal scored on the power play, sending the game into overtime. Montreal won games three and four in overtime en route to winning the series in five games. The Canadiens won an NHL-record ten consecutive overtime games in the 1993 playoffs.

The New York Rangers ended their "Curse of 1940" after 54 years by winning the 1994 Stanley Cup in seven games over the Vancouver Canucks. The Rangers' championship was the last hurrah for the great Edmonton Oilers dynasty of the 1980s, as there were seven ex-Oilers on the team, including Mark Messier, who became the first (and to this date, the only) player to win Stanley Cups as the captain for two franchises, having captained the Oilers to the last of their five Stanley Cups in 1990. The Rangers' victory also resulted in the first Russian names to be engraved on the Stanley Cup: Alexei Kovalev, Alexander Karpovtsev, Sergei Nemchinov, and Sergei Zubov. The global audience of 285 million in 120 countries that watched the Rangers' victory included a huge European audience, including those watching across the former Soviet Union. This Stanley Cup win was the highest-rated single CBC Sports program in history to that point, a distinction that now belongs to the men's ice hockey gold medal game between Canada and the United States at the 2002 Winter Olympics, when Canada won its first Olympic ice hockey gold medal since the 1952 Winter Olympics CBC commentator Bob Cole, who called both games, said that game seven was one of his most memorable TV games.

=== 1994–95 lockout ===
Four months later, the players were locked out by the owners due to the lack of a Collective Bargaining Agreement (CBA). The 1994–95 NHL lockout lasted 104 days and resulted in the season's being shortened from a planned 84 games to 48. The owners wanted to control salary growth and insisted on a salary cap, changes to free agency and salary arbitration. The union instead proposed a luxury tax system that would penalize teams that spent above a set figure on player salaries. The negotiations were at times bitter, as defenceman Chris Chelios famously issued a veiled threat against Bettman, suggesting that he should be "worried about [his] family and [his] well-being", because "some crazed fans, or even a player [...] might take matters into their own hands and figure they get Bettman out of the way."

The lockout entered its fourth month in January 1995 and approached a deadline that would have canceled the season when the two sides agreed to an 11th-hour deal. The owners failed to achieve a full salary cap, but the union agreed to a cap on rookie contracts, changes to the arbitration system and restrictive rules for free agency that would not grant a player the unrestricted right to choose where he played until age 31. The deal was initially seen as a victory for the owners.

The agreement was not enough to save two teams in Canada's smallest NHL markets. The revenue disparity between large and small market teams, exacerbated by the falling value of the Canadian dollar, led the Winnipeg Jets to relocate to Phoenix, Arizona in 1996, becoming the Coyotes one year after the Quebec Nordiques moved to Denver, Colorado to become the Colorado Avalanche. Hoping to prevent other teams from leaving Canada, and citing the cost of doing business in American dollars while taking revenue in Canadian dollars, the NHL set up a currency assistance plan to support the remaining small market Canadian teams in 1996. The Hartford Whalers became the third former World Hockey Association team to relocate in 1997, moving to Raleigh, North Carolina, to become the Carolina Hurricanes.

== Dead puck era ==
Following the 1994–95 lockout, the NHL entered a prolonged period of offensive decline. Throughout the 1980s, 7.6 goals were scored per game on average. That figure had dropped below six goals per game by the 1994–95 season, and to 5.19 by 1998–99. There have been many arguments put forth as to what caused this decline. A common claim is that the drop in offence was due to dilution of talent caused by 1990s expansion, a position former player Brett Hull endorsed. Increased use of the neutral zone trap and similar defensive systems were also blamed. The New Jersey Devils have often been criticized for popularizing the trap, using it to win the Stanley Cup in 1995. This period has been called the dead puck era.

The Canada Cup gave way to the World Cup of Hockey in 1996, an NHL-sanctioned eight team international tournament featuring the top professionals in the world. The inaugural tournament saw the United States upset the favored Canadians in a three-game final. That same year, the Avalanche won their first Stanley Cup in their first season in Denver, sweeping the Florida Panthers. One year later, the Detroit Red Wings ended a 42-year drought, capturing their first Stanley Cup since 1955. The Red Wings' celebration was cut short, as defenseman Vladimir Konstantinov and team masseur Sergei Mnatsakanov were seriously injured when their limousine crashed six days following the victory. The Red Wings dedicated the 1997–98 season to the two. Upon repeating as champions in 1998, they brought Konstantinov, who had suffered severe brain damage in the crash, out in a wheelchair to celebrate with the team on the ice.

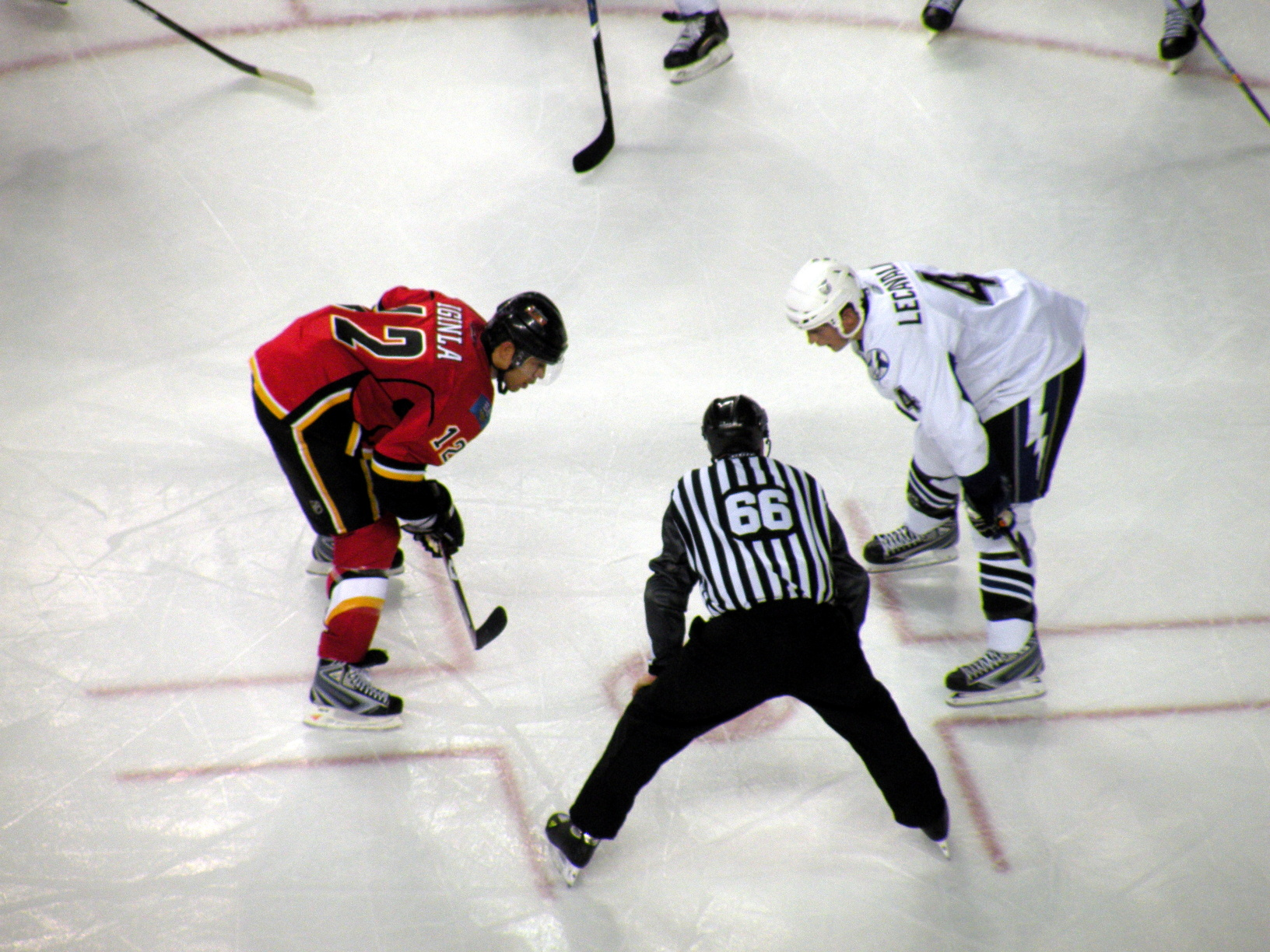
Jarome Iginla and Vincent Lecavalier face off. The two forwards battle each other for the 2004 Stanley Cup.

The NHL added four expansion teams to increase the total number of clubs to 30. Continuing its expansion into the southern United States, the Nashville Predators joined the league in 1998, followed by the Atlanta Thrashers in 1999. The Minnesota Wild and Columbus Blue Jackets then began play in 2000.

On April 18, 1999, Wayne Gretzky played his final NHL game, retiring as the league's all-time scoring leader and holding 61 NHL records. His number, 99, was retired league-wide the following season. The usual three-year waiting period between a player's retirement and his induction into the Hockey Hall of Fame was waived, and he was inducted in 1999.

For marketing reasons, the NHL agreed to participate in the Winter Olympics starting in 1998. NHL players first competed at the Nagano Games. Led by goaltender Dominik Hašek, the tournament was won by the Czech Republic. Hašek, who finished the tournament with a 0.97 goals against average (GAA) and a .961 save percentage over six games, was the leading goaltender of the 1990s. His run of consecutive Vezina Trophies from 1994 to 1999 was interrupted only once, in 1996 by Jim Carey of the Washington Capitals. Hašek won another Vezina Trophy in 2001, and two consecutive Lester B. Pearson and Hart Trophies in 1997 and 1998.

The Panthers' trip to the Stanley Cup Final in 1996 began a trend in which southern-based teams frequently appeared in the championship round. The Dallas Stars won the 1999 Stanley Cup over the Buffalo Sabres in controversial fashion: Brett Hull scored the Cup-winning goal in overtime of game six despite arguments that his foot was in the goal crease, which under the rules at the time would have disallowed the goal. The Stars returned to the Finals in 2000, falling to the New Jersey Devils, who then lost to the Colorado Avalanche in 2001. The Hurricanes first played in the Finals in 2002, losing to the Red Wings, while the Mighty Ducks reached the final in 2003, falling to the Devils. In 2004, the Tampa Bay Lightning defeated the Calgary Flames to win the Cup. Between 1995 and 2003, the Devils, Avalanche, and Red Wings won a combined eight Stanley Cups. The only team other than these to win the Stanley Cup between those years was the Dallas Stars in 1999.

The Edmonton Oilers hosted the NHL's first regular season outdoor hockey game, the Heritage Classic, on November 22, 2003. The game against the Canadiens was held at Commonwealth Stadium before a then-record crowd of 57,167 fans who endured temperatures as low as −19 °C (−2 °F).

=== Mario Lemieux ===
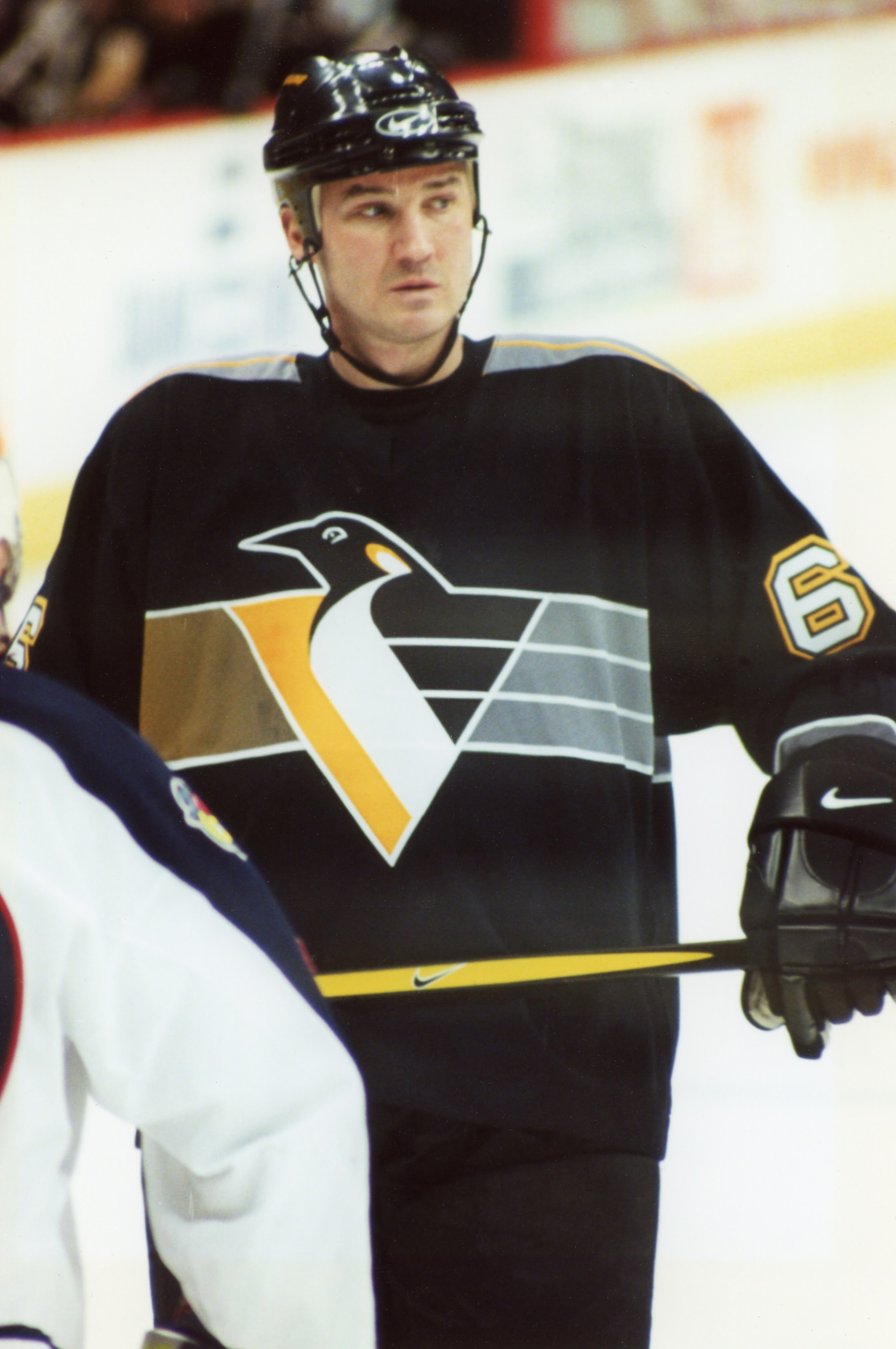
Lemieux in 2001

When they selected him as the first overall draft pick in 1984, the Pittsburgh Penguins hoped that Mario Lemieux would improve the team's fortunes on the ice, and increase interest in the team in the Pittsburgh market. Lemieux, who had scored 133 goals in his final season of junior hockey, recorded his first NHL goal in his first game on his first career shot against the Boston Bruins. On December 31, 1988, Lemieux scored five goals, one in each of the five different ways possible: even strength, on the power play, short handed, on a penalty shot and into an empty net, a feat no player in league history has duplicated.

Injuries and illness plagued Lemieux throughout his career. He played only 26 regular-season games in 1990–91 after surgery to repair a herniated disc in his back, but returned in time to score 44 points in the playoffs in leading the Penguins to their first Stanley Cup. Lemieux continued to struggle with back trouble the next season, though he still won the scoring title, and his second consecutive playoff MVP award in leading the Penguins to their second championship in 1992. In 1993, he was diagnosed with cancer. Lemieux endured 22 radiation treatments in 30 days to treat non-Hodgkin lymphoma. Only twelve hours after his final treatment, Lemieux returned to the Penguins, scoring a goal in his first game back. A second surgery on his back cost Lemieux most of the 1993–94 season, and the entire 1994–95 campaign. As a result of his injuries, Lemieux retired in 1997. He was immediately inducted into the Hockey Hall of Fame; the three-year waiting period was waived by the Hall.

Inspired by his son Austin's desire to see him play, Lemieux returned to the NHL in 2000–01, earning an assist on a Jaromír Jágr goal 33-seconds into his return, and scoring one himself in the second period. He also became the first player-owner in NHL history; he had bought the Penguins in the summer of 1999 to save them from bankruptcy. Lemieux finished the season with 35 goals and 76 points in 43 games. Lemieux continued to battle injuries, missing the majority of the first half of the 2001–02 season, however, he returned to action in time to captain Team Canada to its first gold medal in 50 years at the 2002 Winter Olympics. Injuries again forced his retirement, as Lemieux finally ended his career on January 24, 2006, with 690 goals and 1,723 points in 915 games. Despite his injuries, Lemieux is widely regarded as one of the greatest players in NHL history. Hall of Famer Bobby Orr said that Lemieux was the most skilled player he had ever seen, while Mike Gartner said that if he had remained healthy, Lemieux would have scored 1,000 goals.

== 2004–05 lockout ==
By 2004, the owners were claiming that player salaries had grown much faster than revenues, and that the league as a whole lost over US$300 million in 2002–03. Upon the expiry of the collective bargaining agreement (CBA), Gary Bettman announced that the players were again locked out to start the 2004–05 season. As with the 1994–95 lockout, the owners were demanding a salary cap, which the players were unwilling to consider until the season was on the verge of being lost. The players, for their part, offered a 24% salary rollback to keep the free-market system that was already in place. On February 16, 2005, after a series of last minute offers failed, Bettman announced the cancellation of the entire season, making the NHL the first major North American league to cancel an entire season because of a labor stoppage.

The season's cancellation led union president Trevor Linden and senior director Ted Saskin to take charge of negotiations from executive director Bob Goodenow. By early July, the two sides had agreed to a new CBA. The deal featured a hard salary cap, linked to a fixed percentage of league revenues, a 24% rollback on salaries, and unrestricted free agency beginning after seven years of service.

The loss of the 2004–05 season led the NHL to institute a special lottery to determine the order of the 2005 draft, as there were no standings to base a drafting order from. The Pittsburgh Penguins won the lottery, and selected Sidney Crosby, a highly prized prospect whose arrival to the NHL had been greatly anticipated. Crosby and the Washington Capitals' Alex Ovechkin, the 2004 first overall pick, were expected to become the faces of the NHL as the league entered a new era. Ovechkin was named the Calder Memorial Trophy winner as rookie of the year in 2005–06, while Crosby's presence helped Pittsburgh's attendance increase by 33%, over 4,000 fans per game.

== Shootout era ==
=== Debut of Crosby and Ovechkin ===
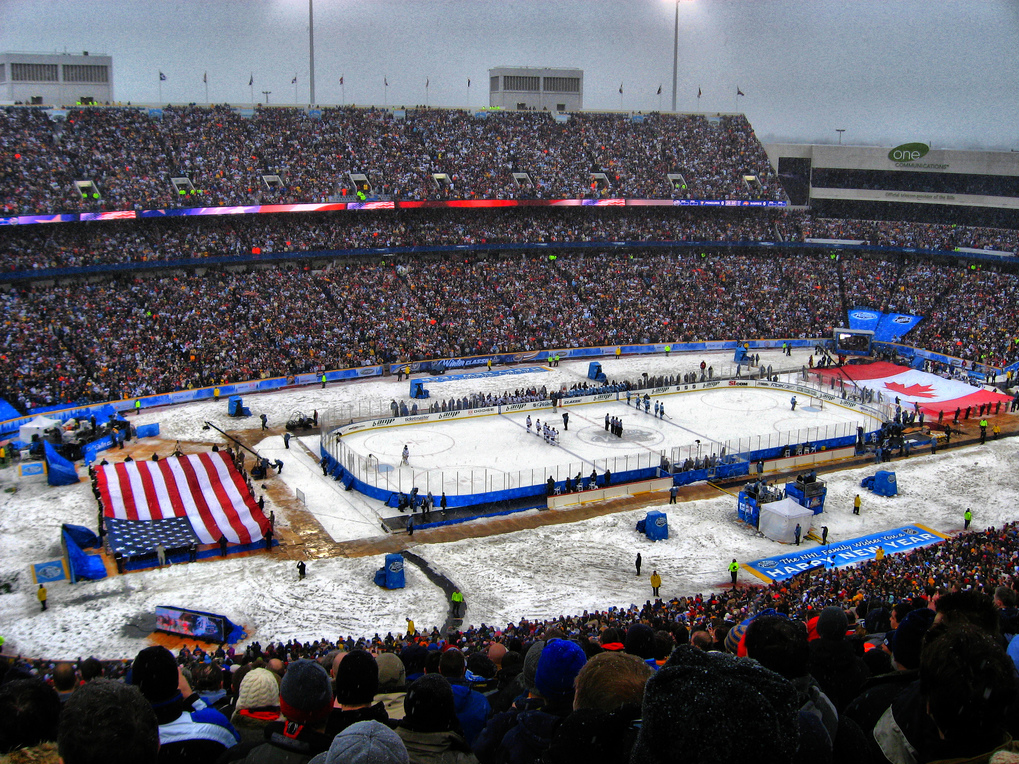
Ralph Wilson Stadium in Buffalo for the 2008 Winter Classic

In the 2005–06 season, Ovechkin and Crosby began their careers. In their first three seasons, they each won both the Art Ross and Hart trophies; Crosby captured both in 2007 and Ovechkin in 2008. The 2006 Stanley Cup Final was the first time that franchises that originally played in the World Hockey Association (WHA) met in the Stanley Cup Final, as the Oilers lost a seven-game series to the Hurricanes. The following season, the Senators lost the finals in five games to the Ducks. The three-year streak of Canadian teams in the finals was halted in the 2007–08 season, when the Red Wings defeated the Penguins for their fourth Stanley Cup in 11 years.

=== Penguins, Blackhawks and Kings dominate ===
The introduction of the salary cap in 2005 encouraged parity in the NHL, making it harder for teams to compete for the Stanley Cup every year. Nevertheless, three franchises emerged to win multiple Stanley Cups each during this period. During the decade from 2008 to 2017, the Chicago Blackhawks, Los Angeles Kings and Pittsburgh Penguins combined for eight Stanley Cup wins. At least one of the three teams or the Boston Bruins appeared in every Stanley Cup Final in that time frame.

The Pittsburgh Penguins lost to the Red Wings for the 2008 Stanley Cup, but returned in 2009 for a rematch with the defending champions. The Penguins would return the favor, capturing their third Stanley Cup championship in Game Seven. Seven years later, in 2016, the Penguins won their fourth Cup against the San Jose Sharks, then repeated the feat in 2017 against the Predators, becoming the first back-to-back champion since the 1998 Red Wings.

The Chicago Blackhawks also had its share of struggles to begin the 2000s, but the team's fortunes soon changed after drafting Jonathan Toews third overall in 2006 and Patrick Kane first overall in 2007. The duo of Toews and Kane helped the Blackhawks end a 49-year Cup drought in 2010 by defeating the Flyers in six games. It was then followed by two more Stanley Cup victories; first in 2013 against the Bruins, and then in 2015 against the Lightning.

The Los Angeles Kings had struggles to begin with, until they hired Darryl Sutter in the middle of the 2011–12 season. Afterward, the Kings made the Cup Finals in 2012, and won the Stanley Cup against the Devils, which was the first championship as a franchise. It was then followed by another Stanley Cup victory in 2014 against the Rangers.

The only other team to reach the Stanley Cup Final more than once between 2009 and 2017 was the Boston Bruins. The Bruins reached the Cup Final twice, winning in 2011 and losing in 2013. The Bruins' 2011 triumph was its first since 1972.

=== Going outdoors ===
The success of the Heritage Classic led the NHL to schedule more outdoor games. The Sabres hosted the 2008 NHL Winter Classic on New Year's Day 2008, losing to the Pittsburgh Penguins in a shootout before a crowd of 71,217 at Ralph Wilson Stadium. The second Winter Classic was held on January 1, 2009 at Wrigley Field in Chicago between the Blackhawks and Red Wings. On January 1, 2010 at Fenway Park in Boston the third Winter Classic was held with the Bruins defeating the Philadelphia Flyers 2–1 in overtime. The following year the 2011 Winter Classic was held at Pittsburgh's Heinz Field, with the Washington Capitals beating the Penguins 3–1, and on January 2, 2012, the New York Rangers defeated the Flyers 3–2 at Philadelphia's Citizens Bank Park. The pinnacle of the Winter Classic's popularity took place on January 1, 2014, when the Maple Leafs defeated the Red Wings 3–2 in a shootout behind a record crowd of 105,491 spectators at Michigan Stadium. The Winter Classic became an annual New Year's Day tradition for the NHL, regularly playing in front of sellout crowds and record viewers on television.

Its Canadian counterpart, the Heritage Classic, continued to take place, albeit infrequently. After the Oilers' successful staging of the event in 2003, the Heritage Classic was held in three Western Canadian cities. The 2011 game took place in Calgary's McMahon Stadium and it involved the Canadiens and Flames. Three years later, the Heritage Classic was held at Vancouver's BC Place and it featured the Senators and Canucks. The 2016 Heritage Classic was played in Winnipeg's Investors Group Field with the Oilers and Jets taking part.

In the 2013–14 season, the NHL introduced the Stadium Series which promoted outdoor hockey to warm-weather and non-traditional markets. Two of the first five Stadium Series games were held in Los Angeles' Dodger Stadium and Santa Clara's Levi's Stadium, both of which involved the Kings against their Southern California rival Ducks and their Northern California rival Sharks.

=== NHL Premiere Challenge and Olympic participation ===
Intending to promote the game worldwide, the league sent the San Jose Sharks and Calgary Flames to begin the 1998–99 season with two games in Tokyo, Japan. Since 2007, the NHL has been sending teams to Europe to start each season. The Los Angeles Kings met the Ducks at the O_{2} Arena in London, England to start the 2007–08 season. A year later, four teams were sent to Prague, Czech Republic and Stockholm, Sweden. One of those teams, the Rangers, also participated in the inaugural Victoria Cup, defeating the Kontinental Hockey League's Metallurg Magnitogorsk 4–3 in a single game. Another four teams opened the 2009–10 season in Stockholm and Helsinki, Finland.

In 2010, Vancouver hosted the Winter Olympics, the first time an NHL city has hosted the event since the league began participating. The NHL's participation in future games remains in doubt, as it had expressed a desire not to participate in the 2014 games in Sochi, Russia. However, the NHL players did ultimately participate in those games. The players strongly favour continued participation in the Olympics.

Due to the 2010 Olympics, the Canucks underwent the longest road trip in NHL history, with 14 games over six weeks, from January 27 to March 13, 2010, to allow General Motors Place to be used for ice hockey during the Winter Games. It marked the first time that an NHL-sized rink was used during the Winter Olympics. GM Place was "Canada Hockey Place" during the games, as the IOC prohibits advertising, including corporate sponsorship, within Olympic venues.

The NHL revived the World Cup of Hockey tournament in 2016, twelve years after its most recent tournament.

=== Coyotes bankruptcy and Thrashers relocation ===
Despite these successes after the lockout, a couple of teams still had financial difficulties. The Phoenix Coyotes eventually filed for bankruptcy in May 2009 after incurring several hundred million dollars of losses. NHL then took control over the team later that year in order to stabilize the Coyotes' operations, with the hopes of eventually reselling it to a new owner who would be committed to stay in the Phoenix market. Meanwhile, the City of Glendale, Arizona, home of the team's Jobing.com Arena, financially kept the team afloat, paying US$25 million (equivalent to $36,910,575 in 2025) to the NHL to cover the club's losses for the 2010–11 season, and another $25 million for the 2011–12 season. NHL eventually sold the team in 2013 to Renaissance Sports & Entertainment (RS&E), a group of Canadian investors.

After also suffering financial losses and ownership struggles, the Atlanta Thrashers were eventually sold to True North Sports and Entertainment in 2011, who then relocated the team to Winnipeg, a stark reversal of the league's attempts to expand into the southern United States.

=== 2012–13 lockout ===
The NHL again entered lockout in 2012, cancelling the first 526 games, about 43% of the season, until at least December 30, 2012. Key issues during negotiations included entry-level contracts, signing bonuses, and shares of hockey revenues. Just after 5 am on January 6, 2013, after approximately 16 continuous hours of negotiating, the NHL and the players' union reached a tentative deal on a new collective bargaining agreement to end the lockout. The first games of the season were held on January 19. The result of the agreement brought the salary cap up to US$60 million with an increase to US$64.3 million the next season, as well as a length-limit on contract extensions to eight years, with seven years on new contracts.

During the lockout, most of the NHL players opted to play in the AHL or overseas in European leagues such as the Kontinental Hockey League, National League A, or the Czech Extraliga. As a result of the lockout, each NHL city experienced a drop in economic revenue. Detroit, for example, lost a revenue stream of US$2 million per game, and an estimated total loss of revenue of US$95 million in the city's bars, restaurants and hotels.

Any concerns about hockey fans returning to the NHL after the lockout were proven wrong. The first NHL game on TV after the lockout drew record ratings on the NBC television network for a non-Winter Classic regular season game. The 2013 Stanley Cup playoffs and the 2014 Winter Classic also had record ratings. For the lockout-shortened season, the NHL recorded record in-person average attendance at games of 17,768.

=== Realignment and further expansion ===
For the 2013–14 season, the League realigned the conferences and divisions to allow for easier travel between teams. The Winnipeg Jets moved into the Western Conference's Central Division, while the Detroit Red Wings and Columbus Blue Jackets moved into the Eastern Conference's Atlantic and Metropolitan Division respectively. Further, the divisions went from six down to four, with eight teams each in the Eastern Conference and seven teams each in the Western Conference. The playoffs structure also changed to follow a divisional setup similar to the structure of the 1980s where the top three teams in each division make the playoffs, followed by two wild card teams in the conference.

In 2015, the NHL accepted bids from Quebec City and Las Vegas to expand the league to 31 teams. Las Vegas was granted the expansion with play beginning the 2017–18 season. Owner Bill Foley revealed the name of the Vegas Golden Knights along with its logo on November 22, 2016.

== Rules and innovations ==
The addition of the trapezoid behind the nets is one of many changes made by the NHL since the lockout.

Hoping to reduce the number of tie games during the regular season, the NHL decided that beginning in the 1999–2000 season, in any game tied after regulation time, both teams would be guaranteed one point, while the team that won in overtime would earn a second point. The theory was that rather than playing conservatively to earn a point for a tie, teams would press for the extra point for the overtime win. In the 2005–06 season, the NHL eliminated tie games altogether, as the shootout was introduced to decide all regular season games tied after the five-minute overtime period. The shootout has proven controversial; critics have called it a gimmick, and expressed fierce opposition to any suggestion of using it to decide playoff games, though the league has not pushed for this to happen. It has also been argued that teams are playing it safe, taking no chances in regulation in order to bring the game to overtime, where they are each guaranteed a point. The shootout also has many supporters, among them Phoenix head coach Dave Tippett, who stated that many fans enjoy it.

The shootout was one of several rule changes made in 2005 as the league attempted to increase offence following the lockout. The two-line pass rule was eliminated, allowing teams to pass from their defensive zone to anywhere in the neutral zone. Previously, such passes could only be made to their own half of the neutral zone. The rule was intended to encourage long breakout passes and create more breakaways. Teams that commit an icing infraction are no longer allowed to make a line change before a faceoff, and goaltenders are now prohibited from playing the puck in the end-zone corners behind the goal line. They are allowed to play the puck directly behind the net, within the trapezoid marked by diagonal lines from the goal line to the end boards.

One of the most controversial changes was the league's zero-tolerance policy on obstruction penalties. The league hoped that the game could be opened up if it cracked down on "clutching and grabbing". The tighter regulations have met with complaints about the legitimacy of some calls, that players are diving to draw penalties, and that officials are not calling enough penalties.

The changes initially led to a sharp increase in scoring. Teams combined to score 6.1 goals per game in 2005–06, more than a goal per game higher than in the 2003–04 season. This represented the highest single-season increase in offence since 1929–30. However, scoring has rapidly declined since, approaching pre-lockout totals in the 2007–08 season.

Other rule changes that were implemented include the hybrid icing rule, coach's challenges for offside and goaltender interference prior to a goal, and three-on-three overtime periods.

== See also ==
- History of the National Hockey League
- History of the National Hockey League (1917–1942)
- History of the National Hockey League (1942–1967)
- History of the National Hockey League (1967–1992)
- History of the National Hockey League (2017–present)
