= History of the National Hockey League (1942–1967) =

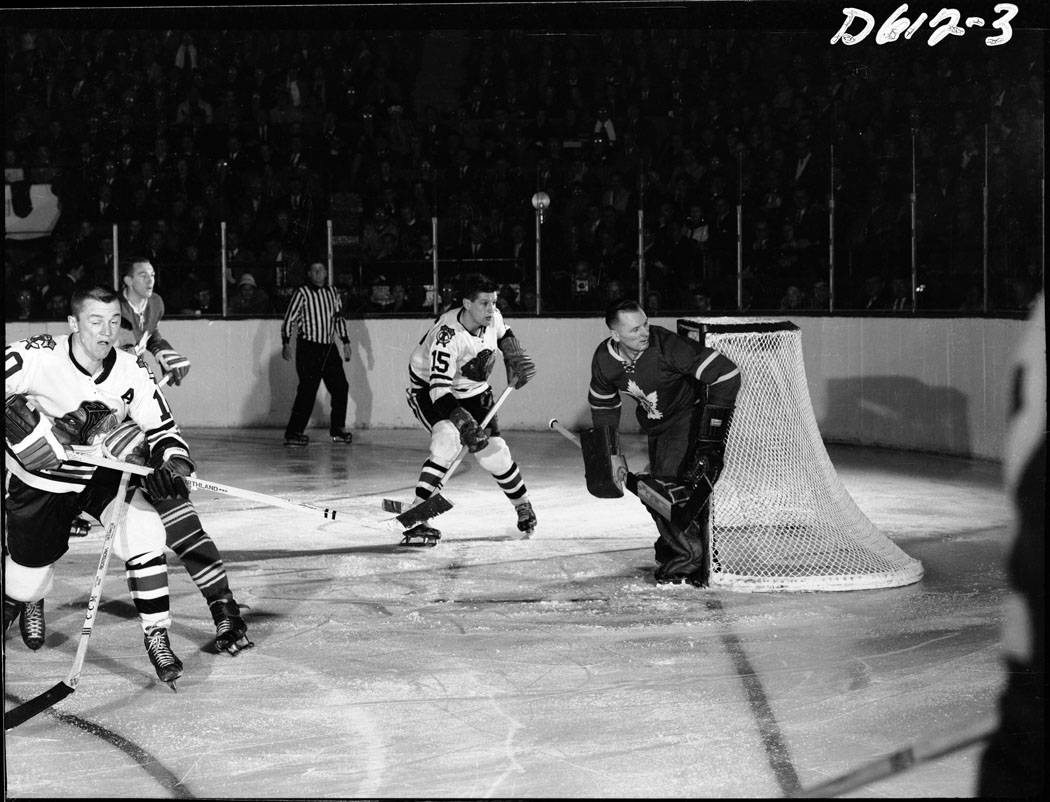
The Toronto Maple Leafs play the Chicago Black Hawks. Note the goaltender is playing without a mask.

The Original Six era of the National Hockey League (NHL) began in 1942 with the demise of the Brooklyn Americans, reducing the league to six teams: Boston Bruins, Chicago Black Hawks, Detroit Red Wings, Montreal Canadiens, New York Rangers, and Toronto Maple Leafs. This structure remained stable for a quarter century; the era ended in 1967 when the NHL doubled in size adding six expansion teams.

The Stanley Cup, having been the de facto championship since 1926, became the de jure championship in 1947, when the NHL completed a deal with the Stanley Cup trustees to gain control of the Cup. Toronto and Montreal evidenced dynasties, as the Maple Leafs won the Stanley Cup nine times during this period, including three consecutive titles from 1962 to 1964 and the final Original Six Stanley Cup, in 1967, while the Canadiens won ten times, including five consecutive titles from 1956 to 1960.

Maurice Richard became the first player to score 50 goals in a season in 1944–45. In 1955, Richard was suspended for assaulting a linesman, leading to the Richard Riot. Gordie Howe made his debut in 1946, retiring 32 years later as the NHL's all-time leader in both goals and points. Willie O'Ree broke the NHL's colour barrier when he dressed for the Bruins in 1958.

The NHL continued to develop throughout the era. In 1943, in an attempt to 'open up' the game, the league introduced the centre-ice red line allowing players for the first time to pass out of their defensive zone. In 1959, Jacques Plante became the first goaltender to regularly wear a face mask for protection. Off the ice, the business of hockey was changing as well. The first amateur draft was held in 1963 as part of efforts to balance talent distribution within the league. The National Hockey League Players' Association was formed in 1967, ten years after Ted Lindsay's attempts at unionization failed.

== Background ==
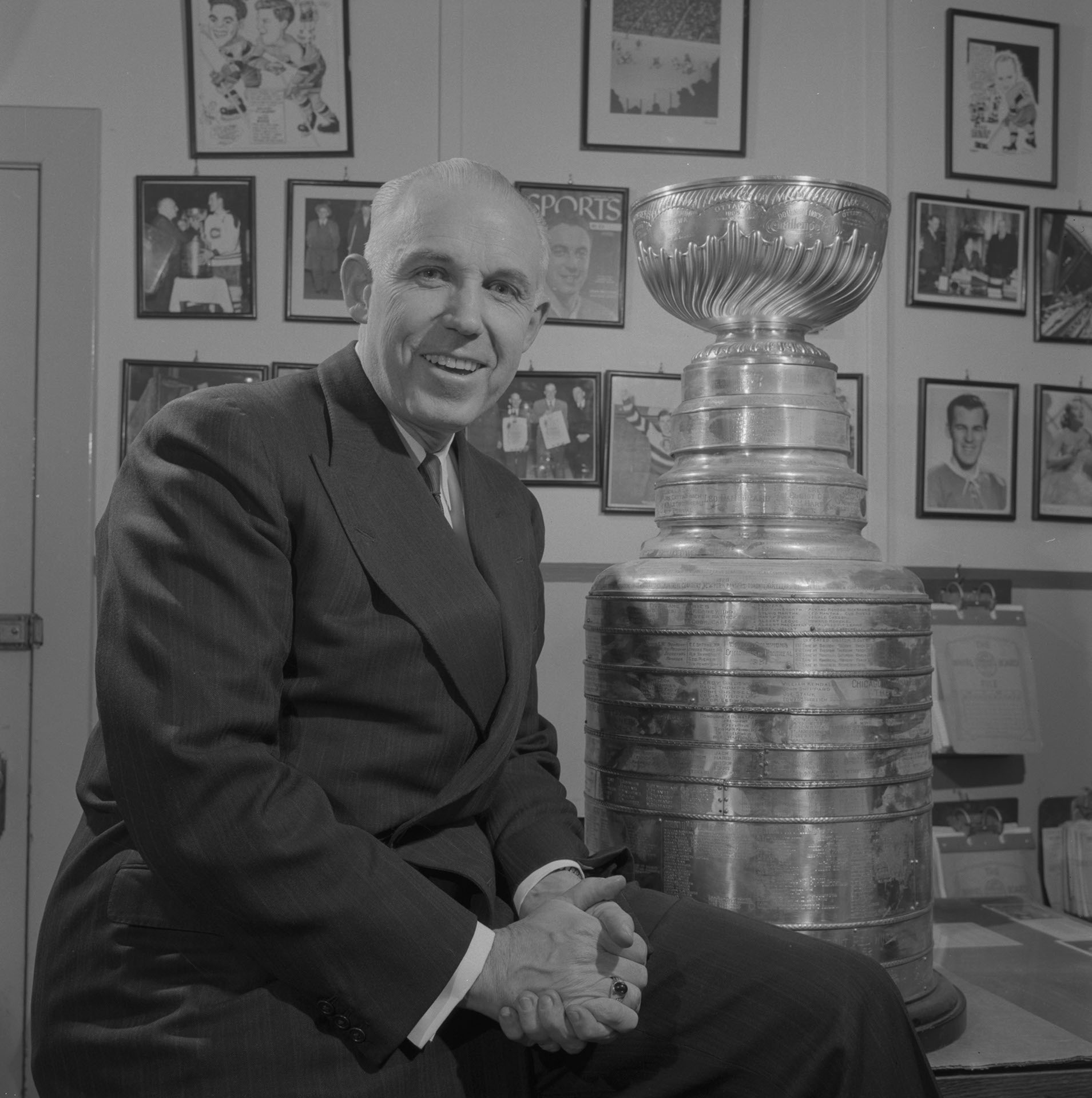
Clarence Campbell served as the NHL's third President from 1946 until his retirement in 1977.

In the 1930s and early 1940s, both the Great Depression and World War II were detrimental to the NHL. Although the league peaked at ten teams between 1926 and 1931, financial pressures led to the demise of several of these. In 1930, the Pittsburgh Pirates relocated to become the Philadelphia Quakers before folding in 1931. In 1934, the Ottawa Senators became the St. Louis Eagles, and likewise ceased operations after one year in their new market. The Montreal Maroons suspended operations in 1937 as the Montreal market was unable to support two teams. The New York Americans, renamed the Brooklyn Americans, suspended operations in 1942, citing financial difficulty, and a lack of players due to the war. By the 1942–43 season, the league was reduced to six teams. Those six teams are now known, somewhat misleadingly, as the "Original Six". There would be no more expansion or contraction until 1967.

There was also change at the top; in February 1943, league President Frank Calder collapsed during a meeting, dying shortly after. After receiving assurances from the league the Brooklyn franchise he operated would resume play after the war, Red Dutton agreed to take over as president. When the other team owners reneged on this promise in 1946, Dutton resigned as league president. In 1946, with Dutton's recommendation, Clarence Campbell was named president of the NHL. Campbell remained until retirement in 1977. Campbell's tenure matched the league's stability. For the first 21 years of his presidency, the same six teams competed for the Stanley Cup; that period has been called the "golden age of hockey". The NHL featured increasingly intense rivalries coupled with rule innovations that opened up the game.

== World War II and post-war period ==
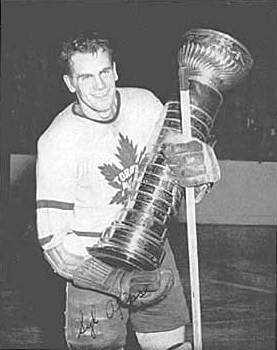
Syl Apps, with the Cup before it was redesigned, in the 1940s

World War II extensively ravaged the rosters of many teams; by the 1943–44 season teams battled each other for players. In need of a goaltender, the Bruins won a fight with the Canadiens over the services of Bert Gardiner. Meanwhile, the Rangers were forced to lend forward Phil Watson to the Canadiens in exchange for two players, as Watson was required in Montreal for a war job, and refused permission to play in New York.

With only five returning players from the previous season, Rangers general manager Lester Patrick suggested suspension of his team's play for the duration of the war. Patrick was otherwise persuaded; however, the Rangers managed only six wins in a 50-game schedule, giving up 310 goals that year. The Rangers were so desperate for players that 42-year-old coach Frank Boucher made a brief comeback, recording four goals and ten assists in 15 games. That year the Canadiens dominated the league, finishing with a 38–5–7 record. Five losses remains a league record for the fewest in one season; the Canadiens did not lose a game on home ice. Their 1944 Stanley Cup victory was the team's first in 14 seasons. The Canadiens dominated the succeeding 1944–45 season, finishing with a 38–8–4 record. They were defeated in the playoffs by the underdog Maple Leafs, who eventually won the Cup.

NHL teams exclusively competed for the Stanley Cup following the 1926 demise of the Western Hockey League. Though rejected by Cup trustees for various reasons, in the intervening years other teams, and leagues, attempted to challenge for the Cup. In 1947, the NHL reached an agreement with trustees P. D. Ross and Cooper Smeaton to grant Cup control to the NHL, thereby allowing the league to reject challenges from other leagues. The last such challenge came in 1953, from the Cleveland Barons of the American Hockey League; it was rejected, as the AHL was not considered of equivalent calibre to the NHL, which was a condition of the NHL's 'deal' with trustees.

The Hockey Hall of Fame was established in 1943 under the leadership of James T. Sutherland, a former President of the Canadian Amateur Hockey Association (CAHA). The Hall of Fame was established as a joint venture between the NHL and the CAHA, in Kingston, Ontario, considered by Sutherland the birthplace of hockey. Originally called the "International Hockey Hall of Fame", its mandate was to honor great hockey players and to raise funds for a permanent location. The first eleven honored members were inducted on April 30, 1945. Not until 1961 did the Hockey Hall of Fame establish a permanent home at Exhibition Place in Toronto.

On October 13, 1947, to raise money for the newly created NHL Pension Society, the first official All-Star Game took place at Toronto's Maple Leaf Gardens. The NHL All-Stars defeated the Toronto Maple Leafs 4–3 and raised C$25,000 for the pension fund. The All-Star Game remains an annual tradition.

=== "Rocket" Richard ===
The 1940s Canadiens were led by the "Punch line" of Elmer Lach, Toe Blake and Maurice "Rocket" Richard. In 1944–45, Lach, Richard and Blake finished first, second and third in the NHL's scoring race with 80, 73 and 67 points, respectively. Richard became a media and fan focus with attempts to score 50 goals in a 50-game season, a feat no other player had accomplished in league history. During that season, in a 9–1 victory over Detroit on December 28, 1944, Richard set a single-game scoring record, scoring five goals and three assists. Later scoring his 45th goal in his 42nd game, he broke Joe Malone's goal scoring record. Opposing teams did all they could to prevent him from reaching the 50-goal mark: he was slashed, elbowed and held, as no team wanted to be known for giving up the 50th goal. Despite the opposition's efforts, in Boston at 17:45 of the third period of Montreal's final game of the season, Richard scored his 50th goal. Until Mike Bossy in 1980–81, no other player scored 50 goals in 50 games.

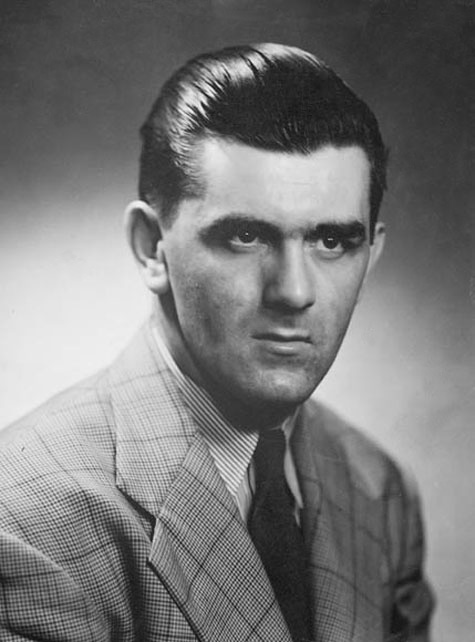
Maurice "Rocket" Richard, the first player to score 50 goals in 50 games, retired as the NHL's all-time scoring leader.

In March 1955, Richard was suspended for the remainder of the season, including the playoffs, after receiving a match penalty for slashing Boston's Hal Laycoe then punching a linesman who attempted to intervene. The suspension created a wave of anger towards Campbell, who was warned not to attend a scheduled game in Montreal after receiving numerous death threats, mainly from French-Canadians accusing him of anti-French bias. Dismissing the warnings, Campbell attended the March 17 game, as planned. His presence was interpreted by many fans as provocation; he was booed, and pelted with eggs and fruit; an hour into the game, a fan lobbed a tear-gas bomb in Campbell's direction; firefighters decided to clear the building. A riot ensued outside the Forum as disenchanted fans leaving the Forum were met by a growing mob of angry demonstrators; the hostile crowd overwhelmed 250 police officers on the scene. Seventy people were arrested, another 37 people were injured; fifty stores were looted, and $100,000 in property damage was reported, in what became known as l'affaire Richard, or the Richard Riot.

The following day, Richard went on Montreal radio to ask fans to cease rioting, and instead support the Canadiens in the playoffs; he offered to take his punishment then come back the following year to win the Cup. While the Canadiens were eliminated in the 1955 Stanley Cup Final, Richard led Montreal to the 1956 Stanley Cup. The incident highlighted the growing cultural gap between French Quebec and English Canada; the riot is often characterized as an early manifestation of Quebec's Quiet Revolution. Campbell's decision to suspend Richard was widely supported by fans outside of Quebec. Some, including Detroit's Ted Lindsay, said the suspension did not go far enough and argued Richard, a man who had paid more fines than any other player in league history, should have been banned for life.

On October 19, 1957, Richard became the first player to score 500 career goals. He retired in 1960, as an eight-time Stanley Cup champion, as well as the NHL's all-time leading scorer, with 544 goals. In 1961, the league waived the customary three-year waiting period; Richard was elected to the Hockey Hall of Fame.

=== Hockey Night in Canada ===
In the fall of 1951, in an attempt to determine whether it was a suitable medium for broadcasting hockey games, Conn Smythe watched special television feeds of Maple Leaf games. Television already had detractors within the NHL, especially Campbell who declared it "the greatest menace of the entertainment world". In 1952, even though only 10% of Canadians owned a television set, the Canadian Broadcasting Corporation (CBC) began televising games. On November 1, 1952, Hockey Night in Canada was first broadcast on television, with Foster Hewitt calling the action between the Leafs and Bruins at Maple Leaf Gardens. The broadcasts quickly became the highest-rated show on Canadian television. The broadcast came three weeks after Montreal radio host René Lecavalier presented a French-language telecast of the Montreal Canadiens' opener against Chicago, marking the beginning of La Soirée du hockey, which Radio-Canada, the French arm of the CBC, broadcast until 2004. On that same night, Danny Gallivan made his debut as the English language play-by-play announcer for the Canadiens.

While Campbell feared televised hockey would cause people to stop attending games in person, Smythe felt the opposite. "There'll be thousands of people seeing hockey as played by the pros for the first time. They'll be sold on it because it's a great game, and they won't be satisfied to stay [at home] but will turn out to the rinks." As an experiment in the 1956–57 season, CBS first broadcast hockey games in the United States. Amazed with the initial popularity of the broadcasts, it inaugurated a 21-game package of games the following year. The NHL itself adapted to become viewer-friendly. In 1949, to make the puck easier to see, the league mandated the ice surface painted white. In 1951, so each team was distinguishable on black and white television, the League required home teams wear colored jerseys, and the road teams wear white. For the same reason, teams painted the centre red line in a checkered pattern to set it apart from the solid blue lines.

== Dynasties ==
=== Toronto Maple Leafs ===
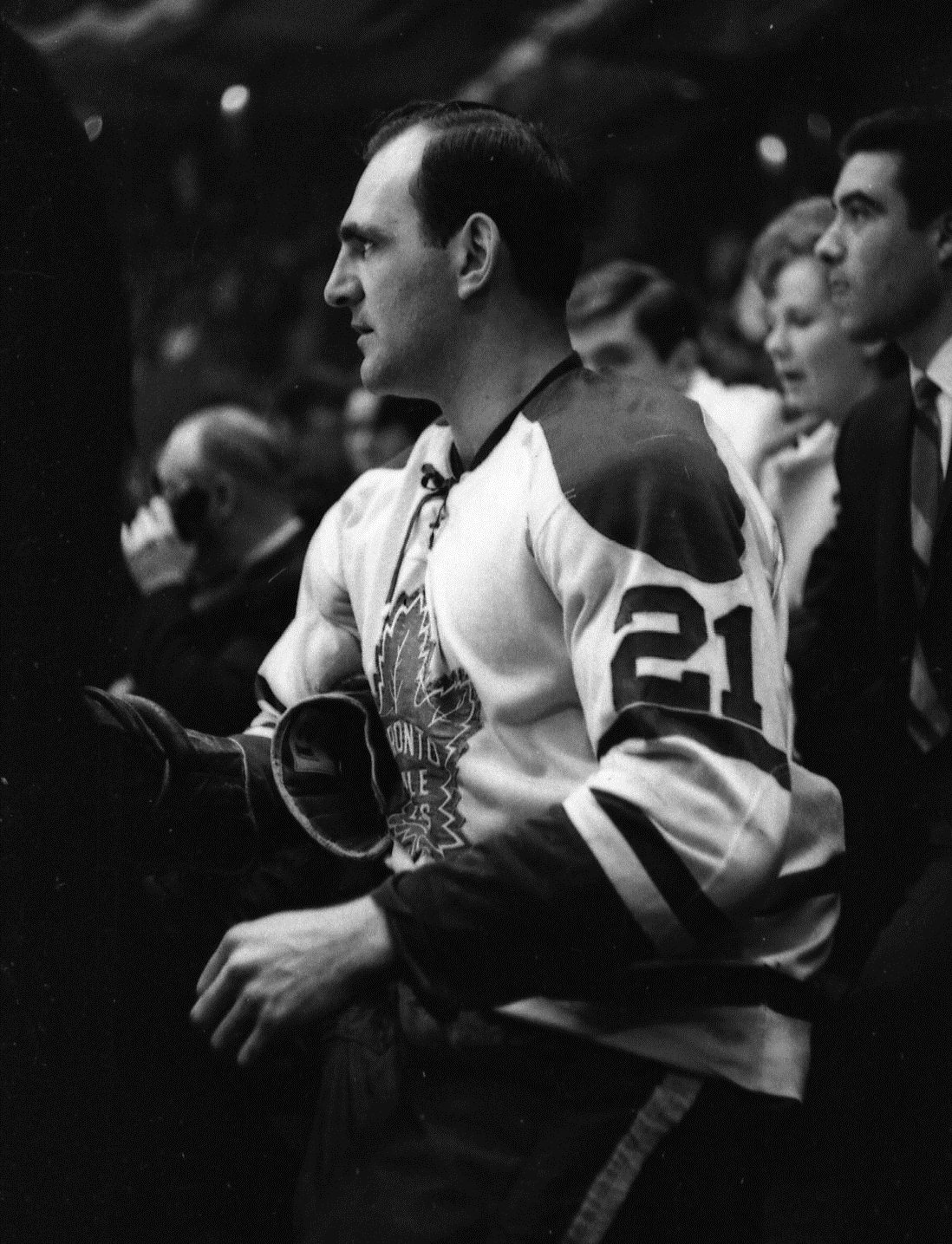
Bobby Baun scored the overtime winning goal in game six of the 1964 Finals despite breaking his ankle in the third period.

In the 1951 Stanley Cup Final, in the only final in NHL history when all games were decided in overtime, the Maple Leafs defeated the Canadiens four games to one. After dashing from his defensive position, despite an earlier warning from Smythe not to take unnecessary chances, Leafs' defenceman Bill Barilko hammered the Cup-winning goal past Montreal goaltender Gerry McNeil. The goal completed Toronto's fourth Stanley Cup championship in five seasons, making Barilko a national hero. Four months later, Barilko and a friend disappeared in Northern Ontario, where they had flown on a fishing trip. Barilko's disappearance became front-page news across Canada; a massive search failed to locate the missing plane. Barilko's remains were not found until 1962, the first year the Maple Leafs won the Cup since Barilko's overtime winner eleven years previous. Barilko's disappearance was immortalized 40 years later by Canadian rock band The Tragically Hip in their 1992 song "Fifty Mission Cap".

By 1962, the disappearance of Bill Barilko and the Maple Leafs' subsequent failure to win the Stanley Cup led Toronto fans to believe a curse was upon the team. The Leafs won the 1962 championship shortly before Barilko's remains were discovered. In 1963, they repeated as champions. In 1964, the Leafs again played for the Stanley Cup against the Red Wings. In the third period of game six, trailing the series 3–2, Maple Leafs' defenceman Bobby Baun suffered a broken ankle from a Gordie Howe slap shot. Despite the injury, Baun returned with his ankle taped up to score the winning goal in overtime. Baun also played the seventh game as the Maple Leafs defeated the Red Wings to win their third consecutive title.

=== Detroit Red Wings ===
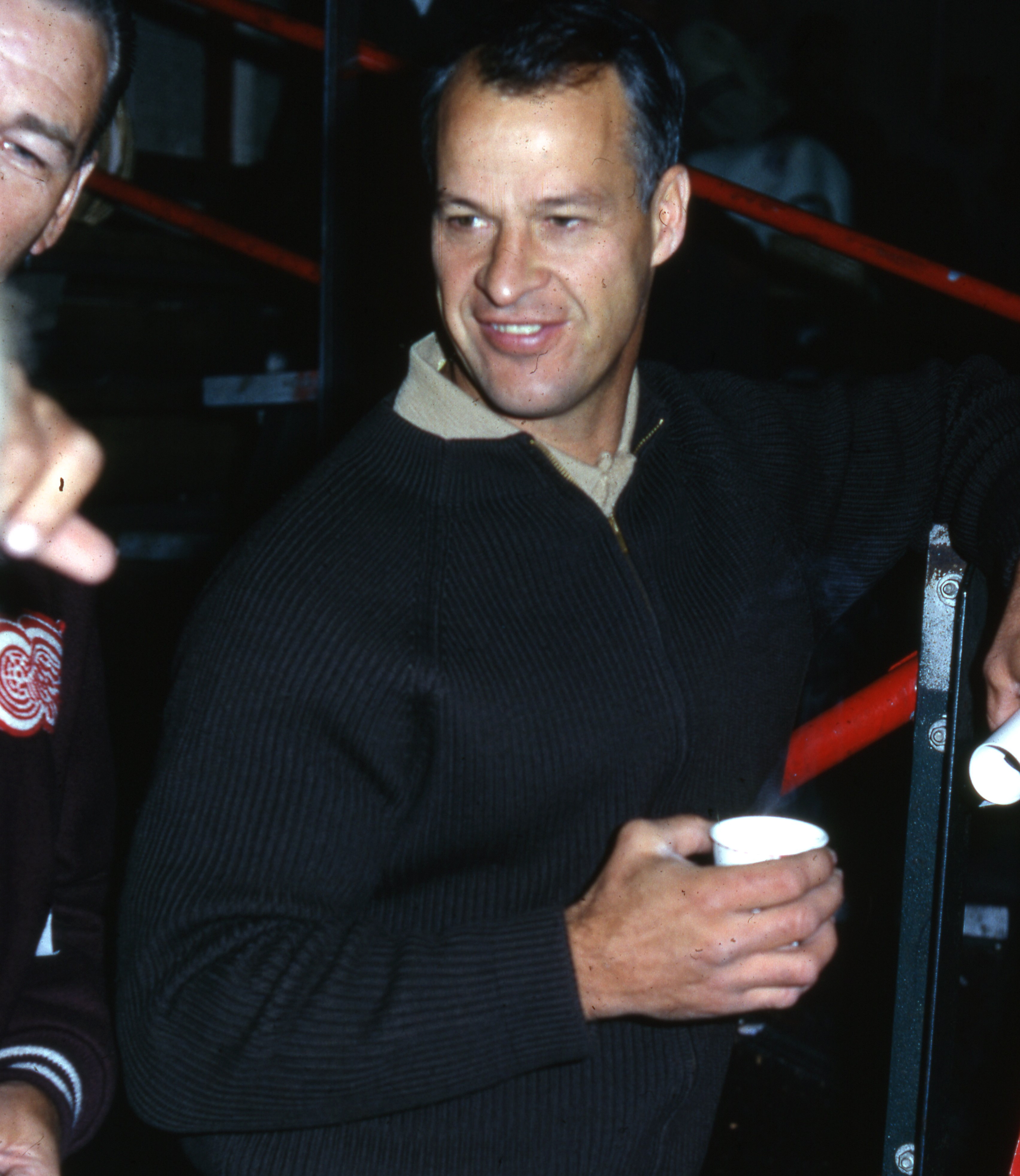
Gordie Howe, pictured circa 1966, helped the Red Wings to four Stanley Cup titles in the early 1950s.

Beginning in 1948–49, the Red Wings went on to win seven consecutive regular season titles - a feat no other team has accomplished. During that time, the Wings won four Stanley Cups. During the 1952 Stanley Cup Final the Legend of the Octopus was created. For the fourth game of the finals, brothers Pete and Jerry Cusimano brought a dead octopus to the Detroit Olympia. At the time, they reasoned the eight tentacles of an octopus represented the eight wins required to win the Stanley Cup. The Wings had won seven consecutive playoff games, and the brothers hoped the octopus would inspire Detroit to an eighth victory. The tradition was born, as Detroit handily defeated Montreal 3–0.

During this time, the Wings were led by Gordie Howe. In 1943, at the age of 15, Howe was invited to the Rangers player camp in Winnipeg; but quickly became homesick and failed to favorably impress the Rangers coaches. The next season the Red Wings invited him to their camp, where coach Jack Adams called him "the best prospect I've seen in 20 years." Two years later, at the age of 18, Howe debuted in the NHL for Detroit. On March 28, 1950, during a playoff game against the Leafs, Howe was nearly killed as he mistimed an attempted check on Toronto's Ted Kennedy, causing him to slam head first into the boards. Rushed to hospital, doctors drilled a hole into Howe's skull to relieve pressure on his brain. Despite fears he would never play again, "Mr. Hockey" recovered to start the following season, then won his first of four consecutive scoring titles in 1950–51. Howe was 52 years old when he retired from professional hockey.

=== Montreal Canadiens ===
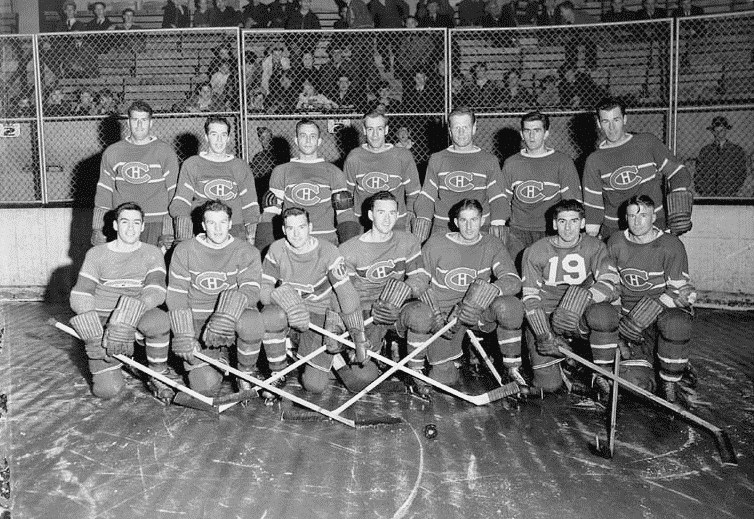
The 1942–43 Montreal Canadiens

In three consecutive seasons between 1954 and 1956, the Red Wings faced the Canadiens in the Stanley Cup Final. Detroit won the first two match-ups, however, Montreal captured the 1956 Stanley Cup, ending one dynasty and starting another. Subsequently, the Canadiens won five consecutive championships between 1956 and 1960, a feat no other team has duplicated.

In 1953, the Canadiens signed Jean Beliveau; a well-anticipated prospect in the NHL for years. Because his Quebec Senior Hockey League team, the Quebec Aces, matched any contract offer the Canadiens made, Beliveau repeatedly refused to turn professional with Montreal. Ultimately, Montreal bought the entire league outright, along with the rights to all players, and turned it professional. Beliveau finally signed with Montreal for $105,000 over five years and a $20,000 bonus, an unprecedented contract for a rookie. Playing for Montreal, Beliveau went on to win ten Stanley Cups.

Led by Richard and Beliveau, the 1950s Canadiens had overwhelming offensive ability; to slow their offence the NHL amended its rules. To illustrate, the 1955–56 Canadiens frequently scored multiple goals during the same two-minute powerplay. In one game against Boston, during a penalty, Beliveau scored three goals in 44 seconds. For the following season, the league instituted a rule permitting a player serving a minor penalty to return to the ice when a goal was scored against his team.

== Breaking the colour barrier ==
On January 18, 1958, by joining the Bruins as an 'injury call-up' for a game in Montreal, Willie O'Ree became the first black player in the NHL. Playing only two games with the Bruins in the 1957–58 season, O'Ree returned in 1960–61, playing another 43 games with Boston. Although he only played 45 NHL games, scoring four goals, he earned the label the "Jackie Robinson of hockey".

Throughout the season, O'Ree faced blatant racism from opponents, remarking "people just wanted a piece of me, maybe because they thought I was different, so I had to defend myself. I wasn't going to be run out of any rink." He endured racial slurs from fans in each of Chicago, Detroit and New York, though the taunts were largely absent in Montreal and Toronto. O'Ree was supported by his teammates and Boston fans. He stated "they were mean to me in places like Detroit and New York, too. But never in Boston. I'll never forget how my teammates there took care of me — men like Johnny Bucyk, Doug Mohns, Charlie Burns and Don McKenney. They accepted me totally. All of them had class." In 1961, O'Ree was traded to Montreal but was unable to crack the Canadiens' line-up. Playing over 20 minor league seasons, O'Ree twice won the Western Hockey League's scoring title: in 1964, with the Los Angeles Blades, and in 1969, with the San Diego Gulls.

O'Ree's breakthrough came several years after another black player, Herb Carnegie was denied the same opportunity. In 1938–39, playing junior hockey with the Ontario Hockey Association's Toronto Rangers, during a practice Carnegie was pulled aside by his coach and told "See that man sitting in the blues? That's Conn Smythe, owner of the Toronto Maple Leafs. He says he'd take you tomorrow if he could turn you white." Stung by the comments, Carnegie resolved to excel at the game. He was offered a tryout with the Rangers in 1950, then a spot on their lowest minor league team. "They told me that if I signed with the Rangers and went to New Haven, I would make international headlines. I told them my family couldn't eat headlines. That was probably when the Rangers decided to forget about me."

== "Norris House League" ==
During the 1960s, it was often joked "NHL" stood for "Norris House League" because the Norris family held interests in several league teams. James D. Norris was co-owner of the Black Hawks along with Arthur Wirtz; his brother Bruce inherited ownership of the Red Wings. James D. Norris was also the largest shareholder in Madison Square Garden, giving him control over the Rangers.

The Black Hawks qualified for the playoffs only once between 1949 and 1957. The team's fortunes turned in 1958–59, following the acquisition of Ted Lindsay and Glenn Hall from Detroit. Making the playoffs, the Black Hawks lost to Montreal in the semi-finals in 1959 and 1960, before capturing their first championship in 23 years, in the 1961 Stanley Cup Final. Chicago next won the Cup 49 years later in the 2009–10 season.

The Hawks' resurgence in the 1960s led Norris and Wirtz to take advantage of their customers. Dubbed the "Chicken Wings" by fans, the Hawks were famous for fleecing fans. Ticket sellers were arrested for scalping; the team charged $9 for playoff tickets in 1965, $3 more than Detroit, Toronto or Montreal.The Hawks also refused to broadcast road playoff games in Chicago, preferring to charge fans to watch the games via closed-circuit television at Chicago Stadium. Fans responded by littering the ice and passing out leaflets urging a boycott of the team during Chicago's last regular season game in 1964–65.

== Expansion ==
In 1963, Rangers governor William Jennings introduced to his peers the idea of expanding the league to the American West Coast by adding two new teams for the 1964–65 season. His argument was based around concerns the Western Hockey League intended to operate in the near future as a major league. Jennings also hoped inclusion of teams on the west coast would make the league truly national, and thereby, improve the chances of returning to television in the United States as the NHL had lost its deal with CBS. While the governors did not agree to the proposal, the topic of expansion surfaced every time the owners met subsequently. In 1965, there was agreement to expand by six teams, doubling the size of the NHL. San Francisco–Oakland and Vancouver were declared "acceptable cities" with Los Angeles and St. Louis as potential sites. Fourteen applications were received from across Canada and the United States, including four from Los Angeles.

In February 1966, the governors met and awarded franchises to Los Angeles, Minnesota, Philadelphia, Pittsburgh, San Francisco and St. Louis. The league rejected bids from Baltimore, Buffalo and Vancouver. The six winning bids each paid $2 million for their franchises. St. Louis was awarded a franchise with no bid received. The league's decision to grant a franchise was contingent on a potential owner stepping forward - a decision influenced by the Norris and Wirtz families, who owned the St. Louis Arena.

Canadians were outraged no expansion teams were awarded to Canada. Prime Minister Lester B. Pearson stated: "the NHL decision to expand only in the U.S. impinges on the sacred principles of all Canadians." Maple Leafs coach Punch Imlach stated Vancouver was "sold out" and Toronto and Montreal did not want to share television revenue with another Canadian team.

Leafs co-owner Stafford Smythe rejected accusations that he opposed expansion to Vancouver, pointing out that he had offered to build and operate an $8 million facility in the city's downtown area, a proposal that he contended made little sense unless Vancouver had an NHL team. However, Smythe's proposal was contingent on him acquiring the parcel of land required from the city, then valued at $2.5 million, for $1. The proposed transaction was defeated in a municipal referendum. Smythe therefore placed the blame for Vancouver's failed bid on the city: "Vancouver lost its chance the day it turned down the referendum on our arena proposal", Smythe said. "That proved to me that the people out there aren't interested in going major league."

The Original Six era ended with the 1967 Stanley Cup Final between the two-time defending champion Canadiens, and the Maple Leafs. The oldest team in the league, the third place Leafs were led in goal by 37-year-old Terry Sawchuk and 42-year-old Johnny Bower. Known as the "over the hill gang", in six games, Toronto became the oldest team to win the Cup, defeating the favored Canadiens. The Maple Leafs have not appeared in the Stanley Cup Final since.

== Rules and innovations ==
In 1942, due to World War II related travel restrictions, league president Frank Calder abolished the 10-minute overtime for regular season games so teams could catch their trains without delay. With the war's conclusion, regular season overtime did not return, although playoff games continued until a winner was decided. Overtime was re-introduced in the regular 1983–84 season.

In 1943, to make it more entertaining, the rules committee looked to increase the game's speed. Rangers coach Frank Boucher proposed the neutral zone divided by a centre red line, so teams could pass the puck out of the defensive zone into their half of the neutral zone. Previously, the league required defensive players carry the puck from the defensive zone, not permitting a pass across the blue line. Introduced in 1943–44, the new rule changed the game. Formerly, strong fore-checking pinned opponents in their own zone for minutes at a time; subsequently, teams rushed up the ice with defencemen passing to forwards beyond the blue line. Scoring increased 10% league-wide; four of six teams topped 200 goals, the first time teams did so. In the early 1960s, Stan Mikita inadvertently introduced the curved blade to a hockey stick. Cracking his blade during a practice and not wanting to retrieve another, Mikita shot the puck in anger. He noticed the curve in the cracked blade caused the puck to behave differently. Both Mikita and Bobby Hull experimented with heating and bending their stick blade to create different curves. Using a curved blade, Mikita went on to win four Art Ross Trophies as the NHL's leading scorer. He later said he regretted the idea: "It's one of the worst inventions in hockey, because it eliminated the use of the backhand."

The NHL amateur draft was first held on June 5, 1963, at the Queen Elizabeth Hotel in Montreal, Quebec. Created by Campbell, it was meant to more evenly distribute talent. To that point, teams directly sponsored junior clubs, buying a player's rights. A 16-year-old with the St. Michaels Juveniles, Garry Monahan, was the first player selected in the 1963 draft. Monahan remains the youngest player ever selected in an NHL draft. The Entry Draft system did not fully replace the sponsorship system until 1969.

=== Goaltending ===
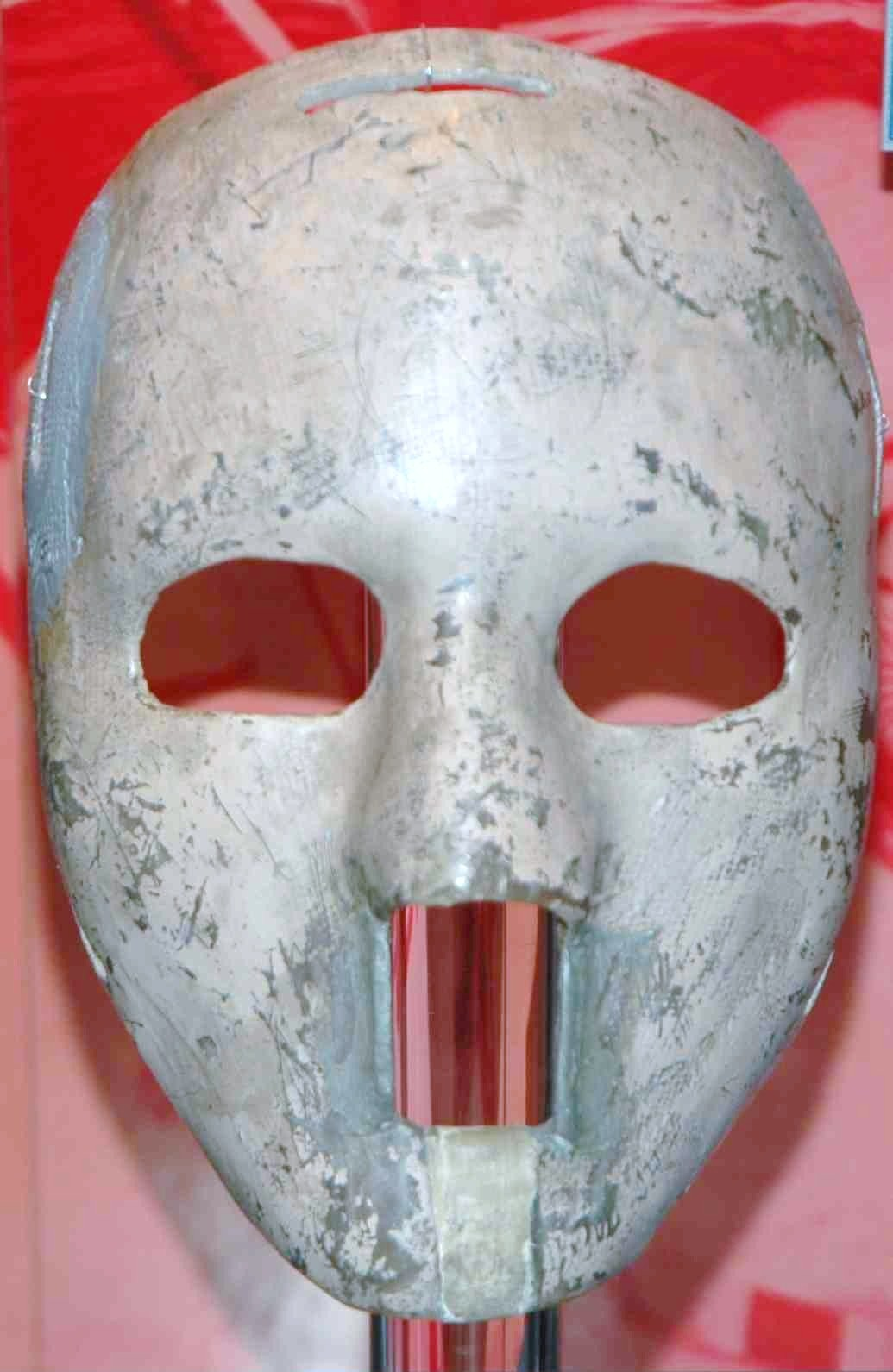
Jacques Plante's original fibreglass mask

Goaltender Clint Benedict was the first to wear facial protection, donning it in 1930 to protect a broken nose. Because its design interfered with his vision, Benedict quickly abandoned the mask. Twenty-nine years later, Jacques Plante made the goalie mask a permanent fixture in hockey. In 1956, Plante began wearing a mask in practice after shots from teammates twice broke cheekbones. Montreal coach Toe Blake refused to allow Plante to wear his mask in games. On November 1, 1959, in a game at Madison Square Garden, that changed, when Plante was struck in the face. Teams did not dress backup goaltenders; the game was delayed 20 minutes, while doctors frantically stitched up Plante. When Blake asked Plante if he was 'ready to return', Plante refused unless allowed to wear his mask. Livid, Blake agreed only if Plante removed the mask when his face was healed. Wearing the mask, Plante led the Canadiens on an 18-game unbeaten streak, to finally remove the mask at Blake's urging; promptly the team lost their first game. Defeated, Blake relented. Plante's mask became a permanent fixture as he led the Canadiens to their fifth consecutive Stanley Cup. Soon after, other goalies followed Plante's lead.

Remarkably, Terry Sawchuk played goal for most of his career not wearing a mask; he crouched very low such that his shoulders nearly touched his knees. This stance became known as the "gorilla crouch". During his career, Sawchuk relied on his ability to see the puck under the players' bodies, his outstanding mobility, and reflexes, to win four Vezina Trophies. By 1955, he was regarded as the greatest goaltender to ever play the game. Sawchuk's career was cut short when he died in 1970 from injuries suffered in a drunken incident with teammate Ron Stewart. The Hall of Fame waived its waiting period, immediately inducting Sawchuk as the NHL's all-time record holder in wins (447) and shutouts (103). Sawchuk's style of play was a precursor to the modern goaltending butterfly style.

The butterfly style - used by most all modern goaltenders - was invented by Glenn Hall. Considered both unique and foolish, Hall's style of dropping to his knees and kicking his pads out in a V formation forced shooters to aim for the top half of the net. Hall adopted the technique as a youth when he lacked the arm strength to stop shots with his stick. An eight-time All-Star, Hall became an NHL regular at the start of the 1955–1956 season to begin a sequence of 502 consecutive games as goaltender for Detroit and Chicago. This record is hailed as one of the NHL's most unbreakable.

== Unionization ==
The first players' union was formed February 12, 1957 by Red Wings player Ted Lindsay, who had sat on the board of the NHL's Pension Society since 1952. Lindsay and his fellow players were upset by the league's refusal to let them view the books related to the pension fund. The league claimed that it was barely breaking even financially, and so could not contribute more than it did. Players on the Pension Committee suspected otherwise, leading Lindsay and Doug Harvey of the Canadiens to discussions on forming a union in 1956. The idea quickly gained popularity and when the union's founding was announced publicly, every NHL player had signed up with the exception of Ted Kennedy, who was retiring.

The owners immediately worked to crush the union. Toronto owner Conn Smythe compared the players association to communism: "I feel that anything spawned in secrecy as this association was certainly has to have some odour to it." Red Wings president Bruce Norris responded by trading Lindsay to his brother's team, the Black Hawks. The move was widely seen as punitive, as the Hawks had finished last in the NHL every season, save one, from 1949 until 1957. Lindsay was not the only player sent to Chicago as punishment; Glenn Hall was included as he refused to distance himself from Lindsay. In Toronto, Smythe repeatedly benched Jim Thomson, who was the union's secretary, before also dealing him to the Black Hawks. The Players' Association responded by filing a $3 million antitrust lawsuit against the NHL. Persuaded by teammates Gordie Howe and Red Kelly, the Red Wings players voted to withdraw from the association in November 1957. Other teams quickly followed, and the union capitulated. Union leadership ultimately agreed to drop the lawsuit in exchange for small concessions, which included a minimum annual salary of $7,000, increases to the pension contributions and moving expenses for traded players.

Led by Alan Eagleson, the National Hockey League Players' Association (NHLPA) was formed in 1967. Eagleson became the sport's first player agent in 1966 when he negotiated a deal on behalf of Bobby Orr with the Bruins that saw the 18-year-old rookie become the highest paid player in the NHL. At its peak, Eagleson's practice represented 150 professional athletes. Eagleson had also helped settle an American Hockey League players strike sparked by mistreatment of players. In June 1967, the NHLPA was announced, and quickly received acceptance from the owners.

== Timeline ==
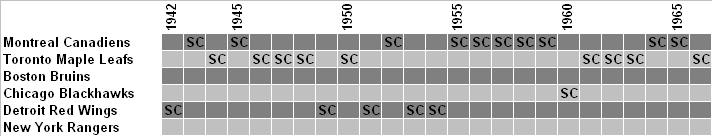

Notes

- "SC" denotes won Stanley Cup

== See also ==
- Original Six
- History of the National Hockey League
- History of the National Hockey League (1917–1942)
- History of the National Hockey League (1967–1992)
- History of the National Hockey League (1992–2017)
- History of the National Hockey League (2017–present)
