= History of the National Hockey League (2017–present) =

The league celebrated its 100th anniversary throughout the 2016–17 and 2017–18 seasons.

The National Hockey League (NHL) began its second century in 2017. Since then, the NHL has grown from 30 to 32 teams with the addition of the Vegas Golden Knights and the Seattle Kraken to the Western Conference. The COVID-19 pandemic was a major disruption to the league during the 2019–20, 2020–21 and 2021–22 seasons. The NHL played games without spectators in controlled conditions. The Arizona Coyotes indefinitely suspended operations following the 2023–24 season; the team's hockey assets, including its roster and coaches, were transferred to the newly-founded Utah Hockey Club (now Utah Mammoth) franchise. This era saw the emergence of Connor McDavid as a superstar, becoming the first player in nearly 30 years to record 150 points in a single season, among other accomplishments.

== Background ==
Prior to 2017, the NHL's last expansion was in 2000, adding the Columbus Blue Jackets and Minnesota Wild to bring the number of teams to thirty. After the Atlanta Thrashers relocated to Winnipeg in 2011, sixteen of the teams in the league were in the Eastern time zone; the conferences remained balanced with fifteen teams each until the league realigned in 2013. Following the realignment, all sixteen teams in the Eastern time zone were placed into the Eastern Conference and the remaining fourteen teams were placed in the Western Conference, leaving the conferences unbalanced. Beginning in 2013, the NHL started hearing from groups interested in acquiring an NHL franchise. Interest was shown from groups in Seattle, Kansas City, Las Vegas and Quebec City. Groups in the west were favoured by the NHL so as to even out the team distribution. Seattle did not have an arena, while Las Vegas and Quebec City were building new rinks. In June 2015, the NHL announced that it was officially considering expansion and set an application deadline for July 20, 2015 for teams to begin play in 2017. Prospective teams had to pay US$10 million to apply, of which $2 million was refundable. Las Vegas and Quebec City progressed to stage two of the process in August 2015. Ultimately, only Las Vegas was approved by the league's Board of Governors on June 22, 2016, to pay an expansion fee of US$500 million. Las Vegas was not considered to be a hotbed for ice hockey. To ensure the new team's success on the ice and attendance, the NHL made more players available in the expansion draft from the existing teams. This led to a large number of trade deals by Las Vegas, as existing teams sought to protect players strategically. The shorter lists of protected players meant high-profile players such as Marc-Andre Fleury, James Neal, Eric Staal and Sami Vatanen were available for selection in the expansion draft.

== The second century ==
=== Vegas and Seattle additions ===
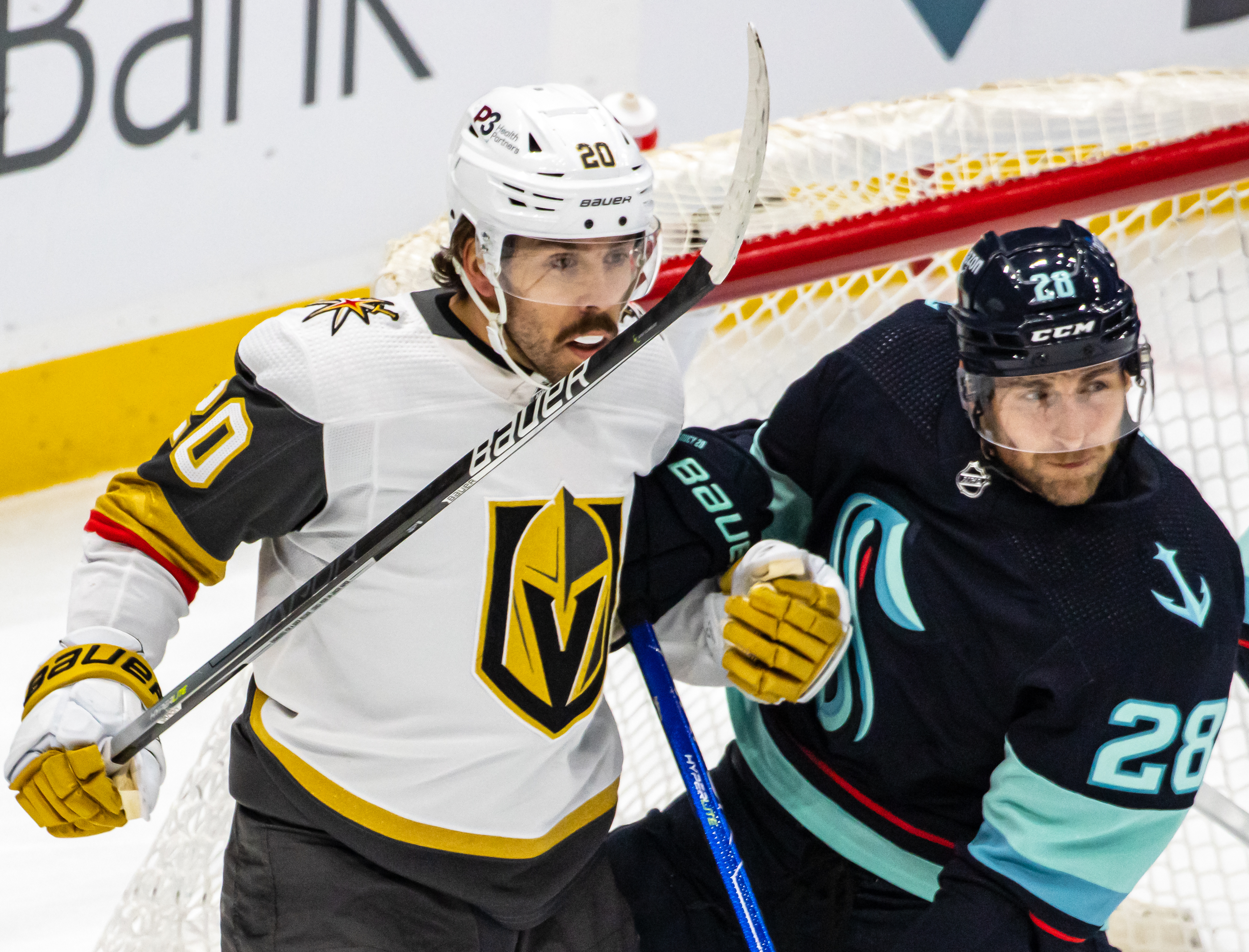
Chandler Stephenson of the Golden Knights (left) and Carson Soucy of the Kraken (right) in 2023.

In 2017, the Vegas Golden Knights joined the NHL, increasing league membership to 31 teams. In their first season as a franchise, the Golden Knights became an immediate success, capturing the Pacific Division title en route to an appearance in the 2018 Stanley Cup Final, a feat never seen before in North American professional sports. They lost the series 4–1 to the Washington Capitals, losing four straight games after a 6–4 victory in the first game. Vegas returned to the Finals in 2023, defeating the Florida Panthers four games to one to win their first Stanley Cup, and becoming the second-fastest expansion team to win their first Cup. Vegas reached the Final for a third time in nine seasons in 2026, but fell to the Carolina Hurricanes in six games.

On December 4, 2018, it was announced that a team in Seattle, later named the Seattle Kraken, would be the 32nd team in the league. Upon debuting in 2021, the Kraken joined the Pacific Division, with the Arizona Coyotes moving to the Central Division. After a dismal inaugural season that saw them finish near the bottom of the league, the Kraken reached the playoffs for the first time in their second season, defeating the defending champion Colorado Avalanche in the first round before falling to the Dallas Stars in seven games in the second round.

=== Multiple first-time champions, Boston's historic season, and Floridian success ===
The six–year streak of a Pittsburgh Penguins, Chicago Blackhawks, or Los Angeles Kings Stanley Cup win came to an end in 2018. The Washington Capitals, not seen in the Stanley Cup Final since their loss to the Detroit Red Wings in 1998, won their first Stanley Cup in franchise history, defeating the aforementioned Golden Knights in five games. In 2019, the St. Louis Blues, who had not made the Finals since 1970, won their first Stanley Cup championship, defeating the Boston Bruins in seven games. As previously mentioned, the expansion Golden Knights also won their first Stanley Cup in 2023, becoming the second-fastest expansion team to win the Cup.

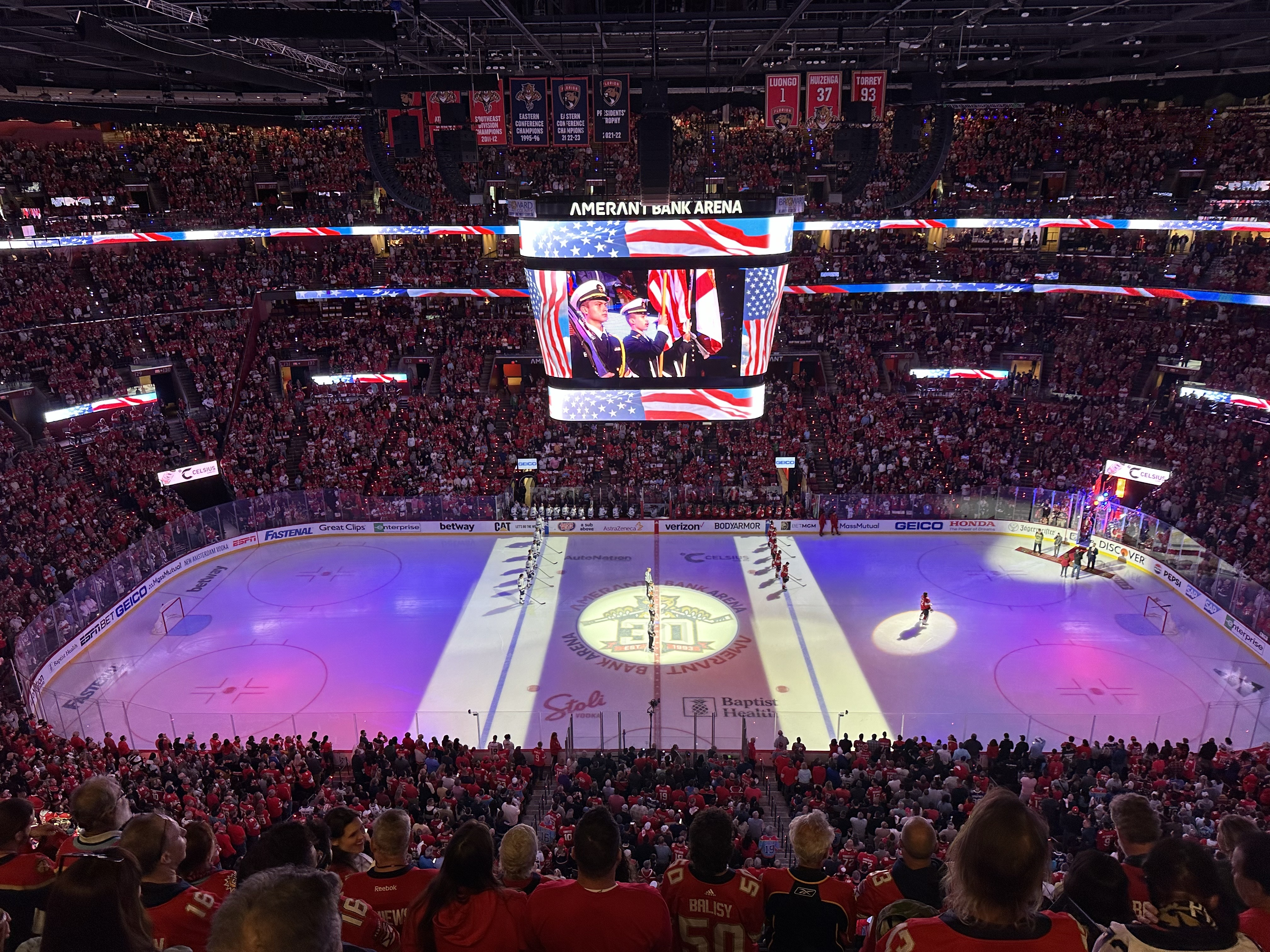
Amerant Bank Arena in Sunrise, Florida, before a first-round playoff game between the Panthers and Lightning during the 2024 Stanley Cup playoffs.

The 2018–19 season saw the Tampa Bay Lightning record one of the most successful regular seasons in NHL history. In their Presidents' Trophy-winning campaign, the team's 62 wins tied the 1995–96 Detroit Red Wings' then-NHL all-time record, with Nikita Kucherov's 128 points then the most in a single season during the salary cap era. The team suffered a humiliating first-round playoff exit, being swept by the wild card Columbus Blue Jackets in one of the largest upsets in NHL history, and becoming the first Presidents' Trophy winners to be swept in the first round. The Lightning subsequently rebounded, defeating the Dallas Stars to win the Stanley Cup the following year after a pandemic-shortened 2019–20 season and modified playoff format. The Lightning then repeated as champions in the similarly shortened and modified 2020–21 season, defeating the Montreal Canadiens in the Stanley Cup Final. Tampa Bay additionally reached a third consecutive Stanley Cup Final in 2022, but lost to the Colorado Avalanche in six games.

In 2022, the year after the Lightning's second consecutive Stanley Cup victory, the cross-state Florida Panthers won the Presidents' Trophy for the first time, despite head coach Joel Quenneville resigning early in the season as a result of the 2010 Chicago Blackhawks sexual assault scandal. The Panthers would go on to win their first playoff series in 26 years, defeating the Washington Capitals in the first round in six games, before being swept by the Lightning in the second round. The following offseason, the Panthers hired Paul Maurice as head coach and traded for Calgary Flames forward Matthew Tkachuk. After narrowly making the playoffs as a wild card, the Panthers upset the heavily favored, record-breaking Boston Bruins in the first round in seven games, despite facing a 3–1 deficit. Florida would reach the 2023 Stanley Cup Final, their first since 1996, but fell to the Vegas Golden Knights in five games. After defeating the Lightning in the first round of the 2024 Stanley Cup playoffs, the Panthers returned to the Finals the following year, marking the fifth consecutive Finals featuring a Florida-based team. Despite nearly blowing a 3–0 series lead, the Panthers defeated the Edmonton Oilers in seven games to win their first Stanley Cup. The following season, the Lightning and Panthers once again matched up in the first round of the 2025 playoffs, with the Panthers winning in five games despite being the lower seed. Florida went on to match Tampa Bay's achievement in reaching a third straight Final, and the sixth consecutive for the state of Florida, facing Edmonton again in a rematch of the previous season. After splitting the first four games, the Panthers won the series in six games to capture their second consecutive Stanley Cup, and the fourth in six years for their home state. The seven–year streak of Florida-based teams reaching the Final came to an end in 2026, which saw the Carolina Hurricanes defeat the Golden Knights in six games to win their second Stanley Cup championship. Despite this, Carolina's victory marked the sixth Stanley Cup championship in seven years won by a Sun Belt-based team.

In the same season as the Panthers' wild-card run to the Finals, the 2022–23 Boston Bruins recorded statistically the greatest regular season campaign in NHL history. Winning the Presidents' Trophy for the fourth time, Boston's 65 wins and 135 points both set new NHL records, surpassing the 62 wins shared by the aforementioned 1995–96 Detroit Red Wings and 2018–19 Tampa Bay Lightning and 132 points held by the 1976–77 Montreal Canadiens. The team set multiple other records as well, becoming the fastest team to 100 points and 50 wins in NHL history, as well as setting a new record of 14 consecutive home wins to start the season. The Bruins suffered a first-round elimination to the Panthers—similarly to the 2018–19 Lightning—after holding a 3–1 series lead four games into the series.

=== Further outdoor games ===
During the NHL's 100th anniversary celebrations in 2017, two one-off outdoor games were held in Eastern Canada. The NHL Centennial Classic took place at Toronto's BMO Field on January 1, 2017, and it featured a rematch of the 2014 Winter Classic between the Red Wings and Maple Leafs. On December 16, 2017, the NHL 100 Classic between the Canadiens and Senators was played at TD Place Stadium in Ottawa, Canada, to commemorate the first games of the NHL in 1917.

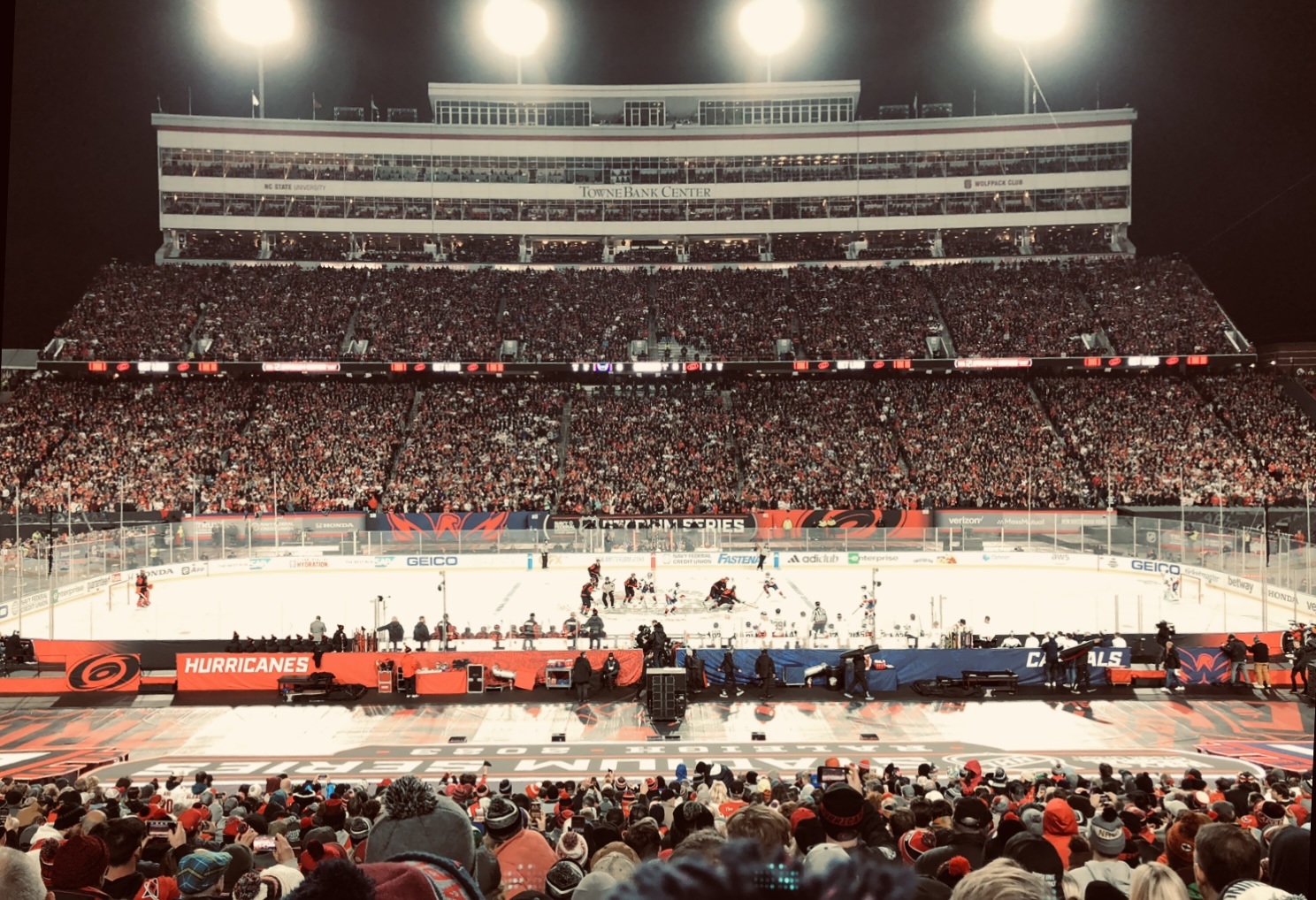
The 2023 Stadium Series at Carter–Finley Stadium.

A series of NHL outdoor games took place on February 20 and 21, 2021, at the Edgewood Tahoe Resort near Lake Tahoe in Nevada. The NHL Outdoors at Lake Tahoe event saw the Golden Knights play the Avalanche in the first game, and the Bruins and Philadelphia Flyers in the second. Unlike previous NHL outdoor games, it was not held in a stadium or ballpark but in a golf course overlooking the lake; no fans were in attendance due to the COVID-19 pandemic. This event replaced both the 2021 Winter Classic and Stadium Series due to the shortened season (see below).

The Stadium Series continued to move into southern and non-traditional markets. On March 3, 2018, the Capitals hosted the Toronto Maple Leafs at the Navy–Marine Corps Memorial Stadium in Annapolis, Maryland, in a partnership between the NHL and the United States Armed Forces. The 2022 edition was contested between the Tampa Bay Lightning and Nashville Predators at Nissan Stadium in Nashville; this was followed by the 2023 edition, which featured the Capitals and the Carolina Hurricanes at Carter–Finley Stadium on the campus of North Carolina State University in Raleigh. The 2024 event returned north to MetLife Stadium just outside New York City and held multiple games for the first time since 2016; in two of the highest-attended games in hockey history, the Flyers took on the New Jersey Devils in the first game, while the New York Rangers took on the New York Islanders in the second. Following the 2026 edition held in Tampa, the Stadium Series will remain in the south in 2027, with the Stars scheduled to host the 2027 Stadium Series at AT&T Stadium in Arlington, Texas.

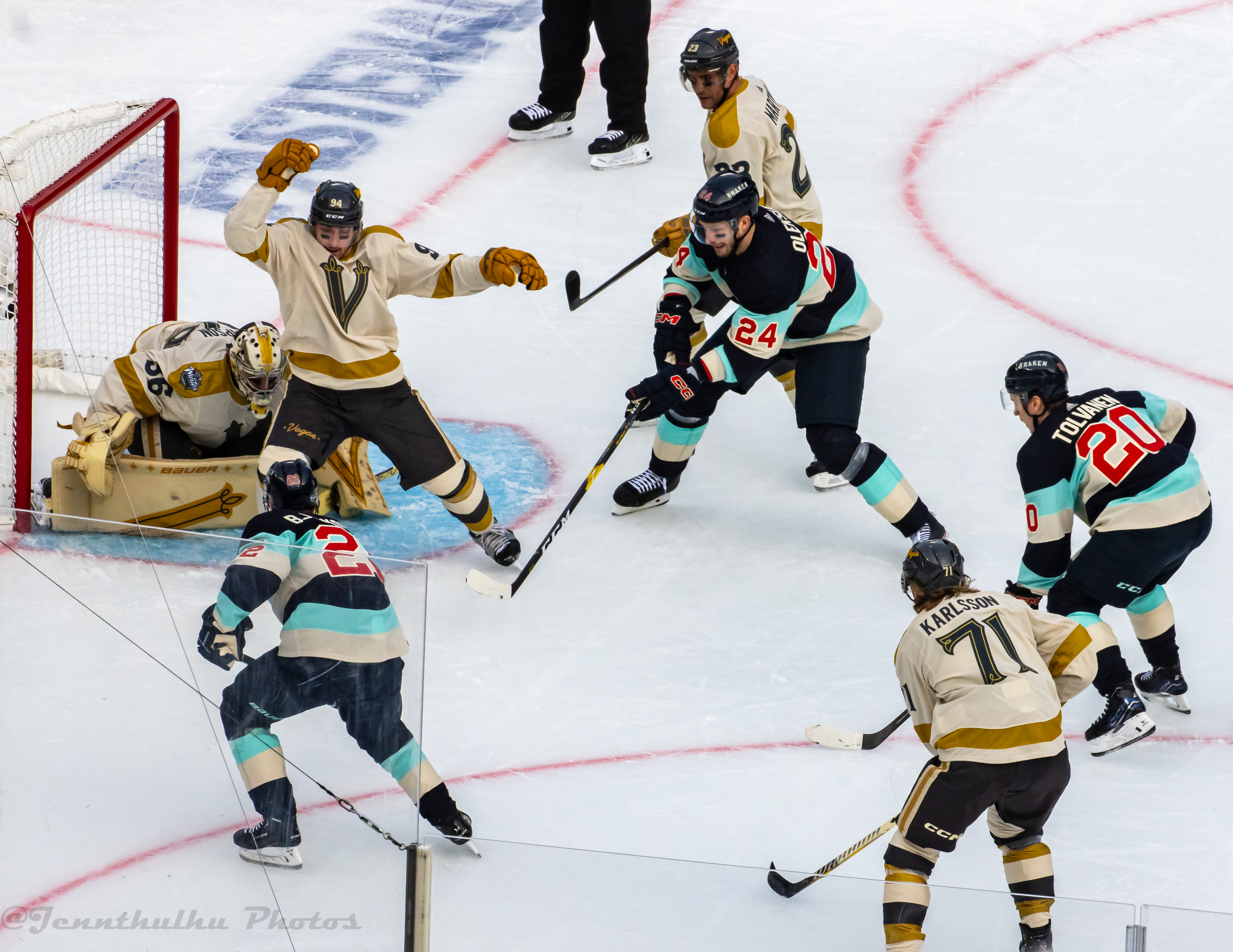
Golden Knights and Kraken players during the 2024 Winter Classic.

The Winter Classic additionally saw a move southward, with the 2020 NHL Winter Classic taking place at the Cotton Bowl between the Predators and Stars. The 2024 event, meanwhile, featured a battle of expansion teams, with the Golden Knights and Kraken facing off in Seattle's T-Mobile Park. Continuing the southward trend even further, both the 2026 Winter Classic and 2026 Stadium Series were held in Florida, with the Panthers hosting the former at loanDepot Park in Miami, and the Lightning hosting the latter at Raymond James Stadium in Tampa. In a return to a colder-weather market, the 2027 Winter Classic is scheduled to be hosted by the Utah Mammoth at Rice-Eccles Stadium in Salt Lake City.

The Heritage Classic continued to be held irregularly; most notably, the 2022 edition became the first to be officially hosted by an American team, with the Buffalo Sabres playing as the home team against the Maple Leafs at Tim Hortons Field in Hamilton, Ontario.

=== Olympic participation ===
In 2017, the NHL elected not to send its players to the 2018 Winter Olympics in Pyeongchang, South Korea. While the league initially considered sending players to the 2022 Winter Olympics, they ultimately opted not to due to complications with COVID-19 protocols. In 2024, the NHL and International Ice Hockey Federation announced that NHL players would participate in the 2026 Winter Olympics. The first six players for each of the 12 participating nations' rosters were revealed on June 16, 2025; all but Italy featured at least one NHL player.

=== COVID-19 concerns ===
The NHL halted play in the 2019–20 season due to the COVID-19 pandemic, indefinitely postponing the remainder of the regular season and playoffs. In early March 2020, the NHL suspended media access to the locker rooms, saying that only official personnel would be allowed in after the games to limit person-to-person contact. After the National Basketball Association (NBA) suspended all games when two players tested positive for the disease, the NHL scheduled a meeting to discuss pausing the season. On March 12, the morning practice sessions and media access were cancelled for all teams. Shortly after, they announced the 2019–20 season was paused indefinitely. It was the biggest interruption to an NHL season since the 2012–13 NHL lockout. On March 17, it was announced that a player from the Ottawa Senators tested positive for COVID-19. On March 21, it was announced that a second Senators player tested positive for COVID-19. Two Colorado Avalanche players also tested positive for the virus. On April 4, the originally intended date for the final games of the regular season, Commissioner Gary Bettman participated in a call with President Donald Trump and other sport commissioners on the state of the sport world.

On May 22, the league and the NHLPA agreed on a basic framework to stage a 24-team playoff tournament behind closed doors. The seeds would be based on each club's points percentage when the season paused on March 12 (effectively scrapping the remainder of the regular season). The top four seeds in each conference would get a bye, while the next eight seeds in each conference would play in a best-of-five series. Many of the logistics still required negotiation, including COVID-19 testing protocols, visas, and whether these games would be held in one or more "hub" cities as the Canada–United States border remained closed to non-essential travel until June 21. That same day, the U.S. government announced that foreign athletes would be exempted from pandemic-related travel bans still in effect.

On May 25, the NHL announced "phase two" of its "Return to Play Plan", which was to begin at some point in June. Players would be allowed to resume use of team practice facilities in small groups (no more than six), with only players allowed on-ice and no other agents or press admitted. Players were required to self-isolate for 14 days if they used public transport, and would be regularly monitored and tested for COVID-19. If a player tested positive, they were not allowed to attend training until cleared, with teams suggested to use guidelines issued by the U.S. Centers for Disease Control and Prevention (CDC). Training camps (phase three) were planned to reopen no later than the first half of July.

On May 26, Bettman formally discussed aspects of the "Return to Play Plan", including the proposed 24-team playoff format (with the top four teams in each conference playing a round robin tournament under regular season overtime rules to determine their seeding), and modifications to the procedures for the Draft Lottery. Whether the first and second round proper would use a best-of-five format as opposed to seven was to be determined, the conference finals and Stanley Cup Final were each to remain a best-of-seven series. Bettman stated that at least two hub cities would be used for the playoffs, shortlisting hosts such as Chicago, Columbus, Dallas, Las Vegas, Los Angeles, Minneapolis, Pittsburgh, Vancouver, Edmonton, and Toronto (the latter two of which would be chosen by the league on July 1). Health, testing, and security protocols would be in place at these sites. As Canadian law requires all travellers entering the country to self-isolate for 14 days on arrival, Deputy Commissioner Bill Daly stated that this may impact the ability to use Canadian host cities unless these issues can be addressed.

On June 4, it was announced that the NHL and NHLPA had approved aspects of the format that had not yet been finalized during the May 26 briefing, with the first and second rounds proper using a best-of-seven format as usual and all teams being reseeded after each round (to account for the lack of home advantage due to all games being played at a neutral site).

It was reported that the NHL planned to have one American host and one Canadian host. As Canada's Quarantine Act required all travelers entering the country to self-isolate for 14 days on arrival, Deputy Commissioner Daly stated that it could impact the ability to use Canadian host cities unless the issues could be addressed. On June 10, British Columbia Premier John Horgan stated that the province's medical officer Bonnie Henry had endorsed proposed protocols developed by the Vancouver Canucks in collaboration with local officials, and that they were being sent to Prime Minister Justin Trudeau for federal approval. These include allowing the NHL to "cohort" players and restrict their access to the general public.

Phase two of the "Return to Play Plan" began on June 8. Amidst an intense growth of new cases in Florida, the Tampa Bay Lightning temporarily closed their training facility on June 19 after several staff members and three players tested positive for COVID-19.

On June 24, Rogers Sportsnet reported that Vancouver's bid had been complicated by disagreements over protocols for positive cases. The next day, Global BC's Richard Zussman reported that the NHL had "moved on [for now]" from Vancouver, and was increasing its focus on Edmonton and Toronto as potential sites. While Las Vegas was initially considered a front-runner, a spike of cases in Nevada and other U.S. states led to reports on July 1 that the NHL had decided on Edmonton and Toronto as the sites.

On July 10, the NHL confirmed that it had ratified agreements with the NHLPA to begin the playoffs on August 1 (concluding no later than early October), with games being hosted by Edmonton (Western Conference early rounds, conference finals, and Stanley Cup Final) and Toronto (Eastern Conference early rounds). The league also renewed its collective bargaining agreement (CBA) for four additional seasons, which includes an increase to minimum player salaries and a 10% deference of player salaries for the 2020–21 season (to be paid out over three seasons beginning 2022–23).

The 2020–21 season began on January 13, 2021, over three months after the previous season had concluded. The league unveiled a 56-game regular season, and that the teams would temporarily be realigned into four regional divisions. Due to limitations on travel into and out of Canada, the seven Canadian teams were aligned into a single North division. The seven teams in the North Division played each other nine or ten times during the regular season. The 24 other teams from the United States were realigned into the Central, East and West divisions.

The NHL returned to a full 82-game season in 2021–22, coinciding with the addition of the Seattle Kraken and the return to the previous divisional alignment. However, by late November, despite the availability of COVID-19 vaccines, most teams again endured COVID-19 outbreaks, resulting in many postponed games. In the case of Canadian teams, some postponed games came as a result of attendance restrictions from local governments due to localized outbreaks. The entire season calendar, which originally scheduled an Olympic break in February after the All-Star Game so that players could participate in the 2022 Winter Olympics, was reworked to make up the games lost due to COVID-19 outbreaks. Thus, NHL players were again barred from competing in the Olympics. On June 26, the Colorado Avalanche won their third Cup in 2022, defeating the two-time defending champion Tampa Bay Lightning in six games.

=== Connor McDavid's emergence ===
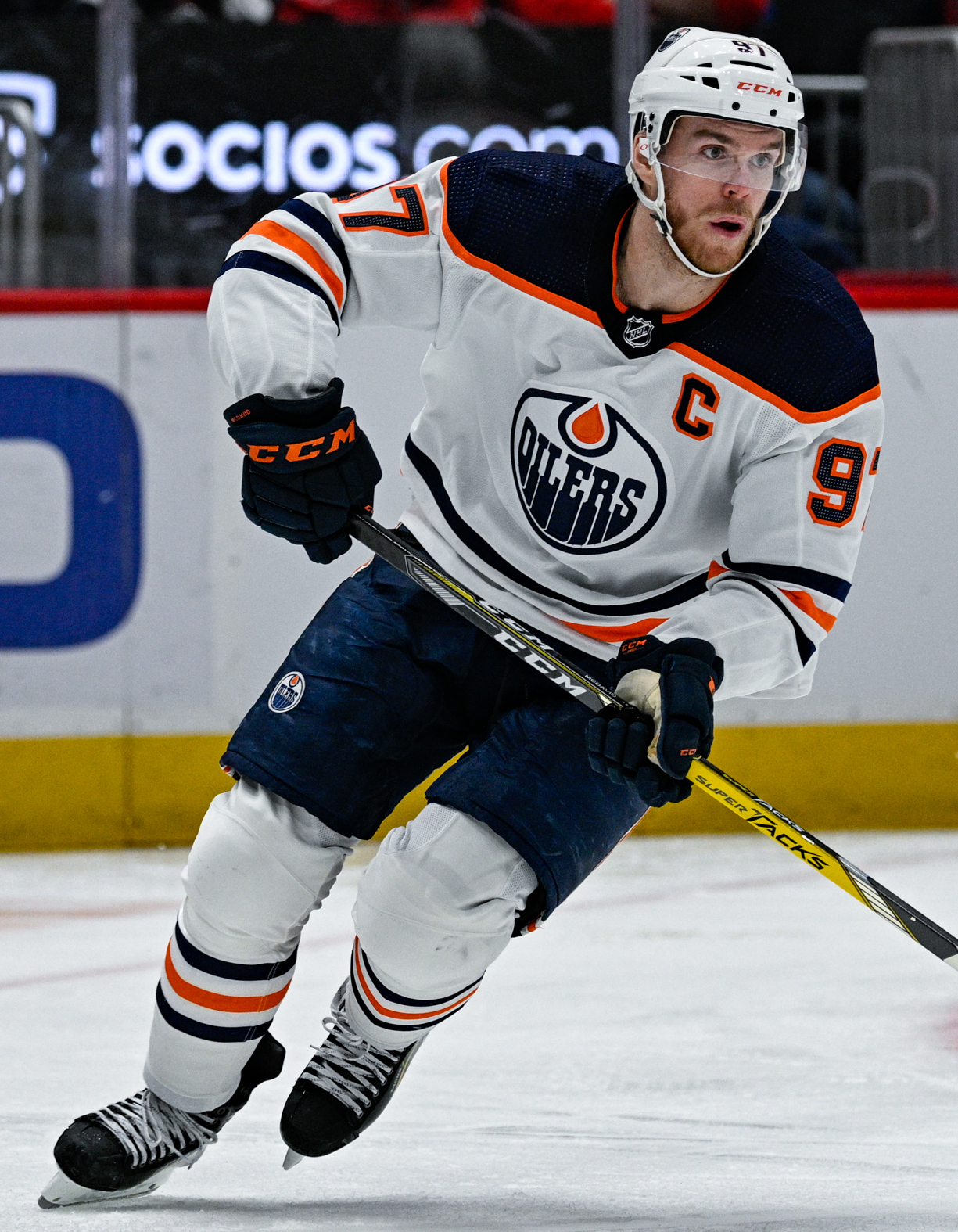
In 2020–21, despite the COVID-19 pandemic shortening the NHL season to only 56 games, Connor McDavid recorded 105 points. McDavid has recorded over 100 points seven times in his career.

During the late 2010s and early 2020s, Edmonton Oilers forward Connor McDavid emerged as one of the greatest players in the history of the league. After winning his first Art Ross Trophy as the NHL's leading scorer and Hart Memorial Trophy as league MVP in 2016–17, McDavid went on to win two more Hart Trophies in 2020–21 and 2022–23, the former of which made him only the second unanimous MVP in NHL history. McDavid likewise won four further Art Ross Trophies in the aforementioned years, as well as 2017–18 and 2021–22, and added his first Maurice "Rocket" Richard Trophy in 2022–23 as the NHL's leading goal-scorer.

Despite the 2020–21 season's shortening to 56 games due to the COVID-19 pandemic, McDavid recorded a league-leading 105 points, in the process becoming the first player since Mario Lemieux in 1995–96 to reach 100 points in 53 or fewer games. He followed this historic performance two years later in 2022–23, where he became only the sixth player in league history (and again the first since Lemieux in 1995–96) to record 150 points, ending his season with a league-leading 153 points in 82 games. Though he failed to achieve 150 again in 2023–24, McDavid instead became the fourth player in NHL history, and first since Wayne Gretzky in 1990–91, to reach 100 assists in a single season. The same year, McDavid led the Oilers to the Stanley Cup Final; although the Oilers ultimately lost in seven games, McDavid led the team back from a 3–0 series deficit to even the series, ultimately becoming the sixth player and second skater ever (after Reggie Leach in 1975) to win the Conn Smythe Trophy as playoff MVP despite losing the Finals. In game four of the Finals, McDavid also broke Gretzky's single-playoff assist record, with his assist on a Dylan Holloway goal marking his 32nd of the playoffs. Additionally, McDavid recorded back to back four-point games in games four and five of the Finals, setting a new NHL record for the most total points in consecutive Finals games.

=== Deactivation of the Arizona Coyotes and expansion to Utah ===
After years of instability, the Arizona Coyotes were purchased by Alex Meruelo in 2019. However, in 2021, the city of Glendale and Gila River Arena terminated its operating lease with the Coyotes after the 2021–22 season, forcing the Coyotes to submit proposals for a new arena in Tempe and possibly play at a temporary location during its construction. The team elected to temporarily play at the 4,600-seat Mullett Arena on the campus of Arizona State University beginning in 2022–23, while the Tempe project was pursued; however, the public referendum to approve the arena failed, with voters rejecting the proposed development.

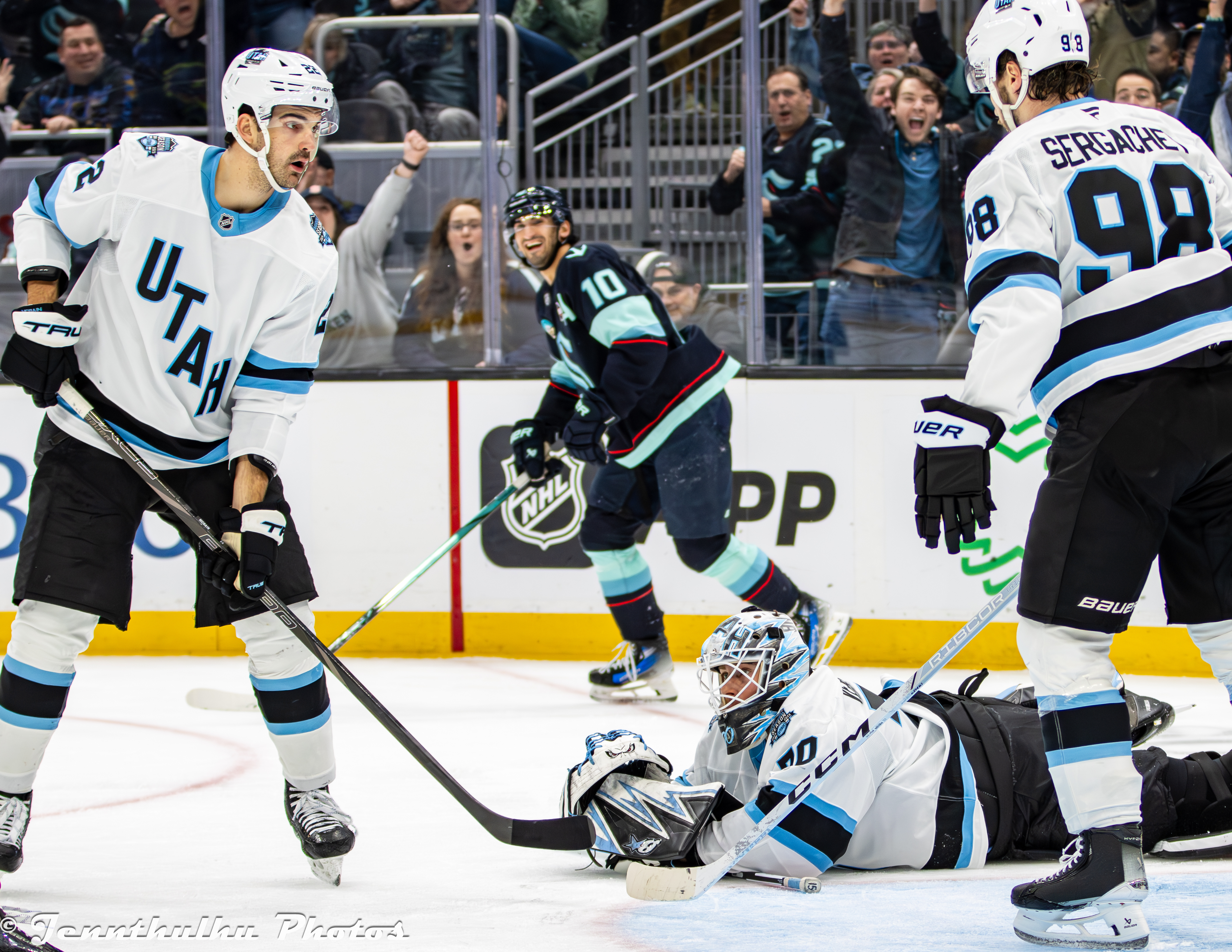
Jack McBain, Karel Vejmelka, and Mikhail Sergachev with Utah in December 2024.

On April 13, 2024, it was reported that, with the NHL's permission, the Coyotes had begun efforts to relocate to Salt Lake City, Utah, following concerns about an indefinite timeframe on a new arena and the effects of continued play at Mullett Arena. The sale, which involved the NHL buying the franchise from Coyotes owner Meruelo, then reselling it to Ryan Smith, owner of the Utah Jazz of the National Basketball Association (NBA), became official on April 18, after the NHL Board of Governors voted to establish a team in Utah using the Coyotes' hockey assets; under the terms of the agreement, rather than a formal relocation, the Coyotes were initially considered "inactive", with Utah regarded as an expansion team in a similar situation to the Cleveland Browns and Baltimore Ravens of the National Football League. The Coyotes continued minor business operations, while Meruelo remained on the NHL Board of Governors as an observer, retaining the rights to the Coyotes brand, with a five-year window to build or otherwise locate a new arena for the team. If this effort was successful, the Coyotes would have been "reactivated" through an expansion draft; conversely, if Meruelo had failed to provide a suitable arena by end of that five-year window, he would have been required to cede the franchise back to the NHL. This would result in the franchise ceasing operations permanently, at that time. Two months after the initial sale, the NHL confirmed that Meruelo had opted not to continue his pursuit of an arena, ceding his rights to the Coyotes and ending the possibility of re-activation.

While the deal was reported in the media as a US$1.2 billion "sale" of the Coyotes, it was in reality two separate transactions in which $1 billion was paid by the NHL to Meruelo for the Coyotes franchise, while Smith paid a $1.2 billion expansion fee to the NHL's other owners. The $200 million difference is thus in effect a de facto relocation fee to be shared equally by the other 31 NHL clubs. The franchise began play out of the Delta Center in the 2024–25 NHL season under the temporary identity of the Utah Hockey Club, with a full identity to be developed in time for 2025–26. On May 7, 2025, the team's permanent identity was revealed as the Utah Mammoth.

On September 24, 2026, the Winnipeg Jets' records and statistics from 1972 to 1996 were transferred from the Coyotes to the current Winnipeg Jets. As a result, the NHL revised the Coyotes' history to be a 1996 expansion team, while the Jets were considered inactive from 1996 to 1999, when the Atlanta Thrashers joined the NHL.

== See also ==
- History of the National Hockey League
  - History of the National Hockey League (1917–1942)
  - History of the National Hockey League (1942–1967)
  - History of the National Hockey League (1967–1992)
  - History of the National Hockey League (1992–2017)
- Timeline of the National Hockey League
