= 1979 NHL expansion =

Changes to North American ice hockey leagues

The 1979 NHL expansion, popularly referred to as the NHL–WHA merger, was the culmination of several years of negotiations between the National Hockey League (NHL) and the World Hockey Association (WHA). The negotiations led to the dissolution of the WHA, with four of its six surviving teams – the Edmonton Oilers, New England Whalers, Quebec Nordiques, and Winnipeg Jets – entering the NHL as expansion teams for the 1979–80 season. The agreement officially took effect on June 22; it ended the seven-year existence of the WHA and re-established the NHL as the sole major league in North American professional ice hockey.

The two leagues had discussed the possibility of some sort of amalgamation for numerous years, despite the acrimonious relationship between the two after the WHA aggressively recruited NHL players upon the former's founding in 1971. The two sides came close to an agreement in 1977, but the proposed merger was defeated by a group of hard-line NHL owners. The NHL also initially rejected the 1979 expansion agreement by one vote earlier in March 1979; however, a massive boycott of Molson products in Canada led the Montreal Canadiens, who were owned by Molson, to reverse their position and call for a second vote on expansion. That second vote saw the agreement ratified after the Canadiens and Vancouver Canucks dropped their opposition.

Although popularly called a merger, the NHL did not and does not recognize the WHA's records or history as being any part of its own. It explicitly treated the arrival of the WHA teams not as a merger, but rather as an expansion consisting of four new franchises which happened to have identical or similar names to some of the former WHA teams. Notably, and in stark contrast to amalgamations consummated within the preceding decade in American football and basketball, the existing NHL teams were allowed to reclaim players to which they held NHL "rights" from the former WHA clubs without compensation, with the caveat being that each of the new NHL franchises were permitted to protect two goaltenders and two skaters on their WHA rosters in the process.

An expansion draft was held to help stock up the WHA refugees' NHL rosters. The expansion teams were also placed at the end of the draft order for the 1979 NHL entry draft, as opposed to typical expansion drafts in North American sports leagues, which usually place the expansion teams either at or very near the front of the draft order.

== Background ==
Since the demise of the Western Canada Hockey League in 1926, the National Hockey League (NHL) had existed as the only major professional North American ice hockey league. After dwindling from ten teams to the so-called Original Six in 1942, the NHL stabilized. In the years following World War II, the league became immensely profitable. Similar to other professional leagues of the era, the NHL enforced a reserve clause to prevent players from signing with other NHL teams after their contracts expired.

Through to the end of the 1950s, the NHL refused to consider expansion seriously. However, following speculation that the Western Hockey League would declare itself a major league, the NHL was entertaining expansion discussions by 1963, culminating four years later with the addition of six new teams for the 1967–68 NHL season; this sparked the first significant expansion period for the league, which continued up until it had tripled in size to 18 teams by 1974.

The World Hockey Association (WHA) was founded in 1971 with twelve teams, and intended to operate as a direct competitor to the NHL. It was founded by Dennis Murphy and Gary Davidson, who had previously founded the American Basketball Association (ABA) together in 1967, with the guidance of veteran hockey owner Bill Hunter to help operations out. By its inaugural season, 67 NHL players had defected to the new league. Former Chicago Black Hawks star Bobby Hull lent immediate credibility to the fledgling circuit when he signed a ten-year contract with the Winnipeg Jets for $2.7 million, the largest deal in hockey history at the time. The NHL attempted in court to block the defections, earning an injunction against the Jets that initially prevented several players, including Hull, from playing in the WHA. The new league challenged the orders, stating that the NHL's reserve clause, which tied players' rights to their NHL team for life, was essentially illegal, similar to results later found in the Oscar Robertson v. National Basketball Association case. A Philadelphia district court sided with the WHA in November 1972, ruling that the reserve clause violated the Sherman Antitrust Act, freeing all players to play in the WHA. The ruling essentially ended the NHL's monopoly on talent during this period of time.

Since hockey salaries were among the lowest in professional sports at the time, a key part of the WHA's business plan was to place franchises like the Edmonton Oilers, Winnipeg Jets, Ottawa Nationals, and Quebec Nordiques in mid-sized Canadian markets, cities the NHL had previously rejected for expansion franchises but which, the WHA thought, could sustain major professional teams in the process. The WHA also challenged the older league more directly by placing teams like the Philadelphia Blazers, New York Golden Blades, Toronto Toros, and Chicago Cougars in NHL markets. The WHA's existence prompted the NHL to expand hastily to Atlanta and the Long Island area of New York in 1972 in order to keep the rival loop out of the newly completed Omni Coliseum and Nassau Veterans Memorial Coliseum, the latter of which would also host the New York Nets in the ABA, a planned rival to the long-standing National Basketball Association (NBA).

== Merger talks ==
Merger negotiations between the two leagues had been ongoing since shortly after it became clear within NHL circles the WHA would indeed play. In early 1973, NHL governors Bill Jennings of the New York Rangers and Ed Snider of the Philadelphia Flyers approached the WHA and offered to have all 12 of its franchises join the NHL if the WHA franchises would pay $4 million each in expansion fees. This overture went nowhere, particularly since in addition to the aforementioned franchise fees, Jennings and Snider demanded that the Raiders and Blazers pay exorbitant compensation for "invading" New York and Philadelphia, based on the indemnity the Islanders paid the Rangers when they were granted an NHL franchise.

Attempts at reconciliation were frequently blocked by Toronto's Harold Ballard, Chicago's Bill Wirtz, and Boston's Paul A. Mooney, owners or governors of the three NHL teams most affected by the WHA's player raids. By 1976, however, both leagues were struggling under the financial pressures of competing against each other both on the ice and in the courtroom. Bobby Hull had become an outspoken proponent of a merger between the two leagues, though Gordie Howe (the NHL's all-time scoring leader-turned-WHA player) and WHA president Bill MacFarland disagreed upon the merger themselves, arguing that the WHA was sustainable under an indefinite basis.

Long-time NHL President Clarence Campbell was also fiercely opposed to any union between the two leagues, saying, "They're our rivals. They were people that did their best to destroy us. Why would we salvage them now? To hell with them." Despite this animosity in mind within both leagues, some NHL teams agreed to play preseason exhibition games against WHA opponents prior to the 1974–75 season. Campbell ordered this interleague play be halted in 1975, but the following year, the NHL president (who by this time was facing both declining health and personal scandal himself) relented and interleague exhibition games resumed, although a few NHL clubs, including Montreal and Toronto, continued to boycott them entirely.

Campbell retired in 1977, and his successor, John Ziegler, was more open to unification. Under Ziegler's presidency, interleague exhibition games became more common, eventually involving every NHL team except for Los Angeles, Buffalo, Toronto, and Montreal. Merger negotiations also intensified and continued to be conducted more openly. The American teams in question were far less hostile to the idea of a merger than their Canadian counterparts. There were a number of reasons for this, but probably the most compelling was the Montreal Canadiens' dominance of the NHL during the years of the WHA's existence. The Canadiens had won five Stanley Cup championships during this time, including four in a row from 1976 through 1979. The 1976–77 Canadiens in particular are also widely considered to be the most dominant team in NHL history. Montreal owed this success in large part to its ability to better resist the WHA's efforts to lure away its players, a notable exception being J.C. Tremblay, who left the Canadiens to play for the WHA's nearby rivals, the Quebec Nordiques. While this may have been in part because Canadian Hockey Night in Canada television revenues were mostly distributed among the three Canadian teams instead of across the league, an additional factor was that star Quebecer players were long accustomed to playing in their home province, and even with the draft in effect, these players (in particular, Guy Lafleur) successfully leveraged the threat of signing with the Nordiques to ensure the Canadiens were able to acquire their NHL rights instead. Hence, adding Canadian teams and in particular either absorbing or eliminating the Nordiques outright had the potential of blunting that advantage. Also, both NHL and WHA owners realized that the Canadian markets were a vital economic base, both to the WHA and any future rival league that might take its place. Absorbing the Canadian markets would therefore preclude the possibility of the NHL having to fight off another rival league.

American support for a merger, however, was based on the assumption that all existing NHL teams would share the expansion fees equally; this did not go over well with the league's Canadian owners by comparison. The objection was not without precedent; in 1970, Montreal and Toronto had only agreed to support Vancouver's addition to the NHL after they were paid indemnities for the inclusion of the Canucks in the Hockey Night in Canada television deal. Although the three Canadian teams could not block any agreement on their own, the fact that any deal needed three-quarters support among the NHL owners meant that the Canadian teams only needed two American clubs to side with them in order to block any agreement in mind.

In June 1977, Ziegler announced that the NHL had created a committee to investigate the possibility of a merger, while Bill DeWitt, Jr., owner of the WHA's Cincinnati Stingers, stated that Ziegler had invited six WHA teams to join the NHL for the 1977–78 season if various conditions could be met. This proposal would have seen the six teams in question become full NHL members, but play in their own division with a separate schedule for the first year.

Led by Toronto's Harold Ballard, the owners voted down Ziegler's proposal in rejection. The Calgary Cowboys, who had hoped to be one of the six teams to join the NHL, subsequently folded, as did the Phoenix Roadrunners, Minnesota Fighting Saints, and San Diego Mariners. This reduced the WHA to eight teams for the 1977–78 WHA season, and left its own long-term future in doubt.

== 1978 revised agreement ==
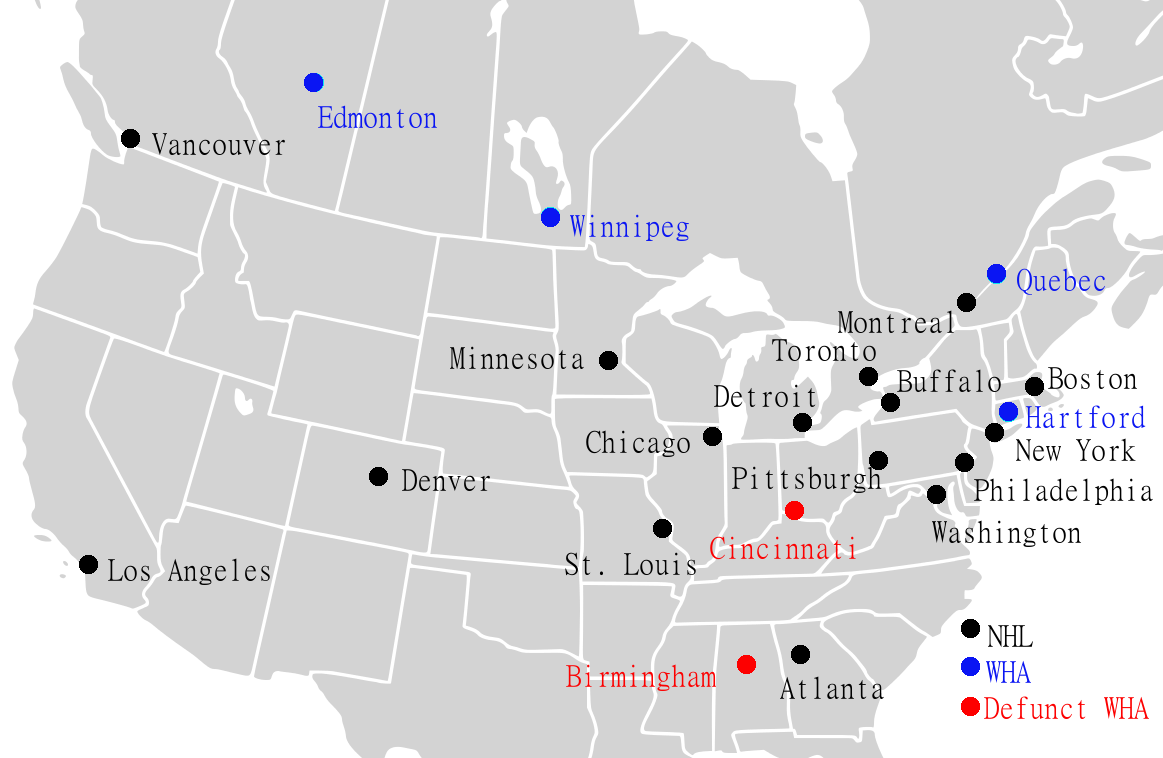
Cities hosting NHL and WHA teams in June 1979

The intense competition between the leagues did not leave the NHL unscathed either. The Pittsburgh Penguins filed for bankruptcy in 1975 and nearly moved to Seattle before they found stable ownership with shopping mall magnate Edward J. DeBartolo Sr., a native of nearby Youngstown, Ohio, who decided to keep the team in Pittsburgh (DeBartolo's son, Edward J. DeBartolo Jr., would later go on to own the San Francisco 49ers of the National Football League (NFL)). The California Golden Seals and Kansas City Scouts were not as lucky, however, as both teams moved for 1976, with the Golden Seals becoming the Cleveland Barons and the Scouts the Colorado Rockies after only two years in Kansas City. By 1978 the NHL faced the possibility of two of its own teams (the Minnesota North Stars and Barons) folding altogether. Ziegler was able to mitigate the damage by arranging a merger between the two clubs; the Barons remained the most recent example of an American professional sports team in an established major league ceasing operations until the suspension of the Arizona Coyotes.

Negotiations resumed in 1978, and it again appeared that the Houston Aeros, as one of the league's strongest teams, were an obvious candidate to join the NHL. Unfortunately for Houston, by this time, Ziegler realized NHL owners would never vote to admit six teams into the NHL, and floated a proposal that would admit only four WHA franchises instead. The WHA responded by insisting that all three of its Canadian teams would be admitted to the NHL. This left room for only one American team, with the only serious contenders for that final spot of entry being the Aeros and Whalers. Aeros owner Kenneth Schnitzer attempted to persuade Boston Bruins owner Jeremy Jacobs to support the agreement that included the Aeros and not the Bruins' neighbors based in Hartford, only to find that Jacobs, as one of the older league's most hard-lined owners, was opposed to any sort of merger with the WHA entirely and that Ziegler was actually cool to the idea of adding another Sun Belt NHL team. Of the three Sun Belt teams that had joined the league since 1967, one (the California Golden Seals) had already relocated and had later become defunct altogether while the two (the Los Angeles Kings and Atlanta Flames) were struggling financially.

During the final series of talks, it soon became evident that no merger of any sort would take place in time for the 1978–79 NHL season to begin. It was also apparent that when there was a merger in mind, the Aeros were not likely to be included in it. Schnitzer announced that the Aeros would not take part in the 1978–79 WHA season whatsoever, officially bringing the league down to only seven teams akin to the ABA's final number of teams playing in its last season of operation. He first applied for direct admission into the NHL, only to find the older league being uninterested in such an expansion with so many of its existing franchises already struggling as it was. Finally, Schnitzer campaigned to be allowed to purchase an existing club and relocate it to Houston instead. The obvious candidate to move was the Barons (the former Golden Seals), who were on the verge of folding operations by this time. Schnitzer believed the older league would accept almost any other proposal as an alternative to the perceived embarrassment of having to disband a franchise of their own accord, and he did come close to a deal to relocate the moribund Barons franchise to Houston instead. However, the NHL instead opted to approve a proposal from George and Gordon Gund (the owners of the Barons) to buy the North Stars franchise and essentially "merge" it with their own franchise. Having run out of options, Schnitzer folded the Aeros on July 9, 1978. In doing so, the Aeros essentially became the only WHA playoff champion that did not eventually join the NHL in any way, shape, or form.

Discussion between the two leagues intensified into the 1978–79 season, when the WHA made an offer to have five teams of their now seven teams join the NHL the following year, paying $5 million each for the right to join in. Although the WHA offer was not accepted, Ziegler was encouraged, stating that owners were beginning to view the negotiations from a business standpoint rather than an emotional one. The WHA saw the Indianapolis Racers fold after only 25 games, reducing the league further to six teams, the lowest in league history and reminiscent of the final team count of the ABA before it entered merger talks with the NBA.

== Final agreement ==
Six teams was widely seen as the absolute minimum to maintain a viable and credible league, similar to what the ABA had faced near the end of its lifetime. With the WHA facing financial difficulty and struggling to meet payrolls, the Racers' demise left the floundering league's players and fans in doubt as to whether the league would even finish their own season entirely. However, the Racers left the league with a key piece of leverage when flamboyant owner Nelson Skalbania signed 17-year-old superstar Wayne Gretzky to a lucrative personal services contract. At the time, the NHL did not permit the signing of players under 20, nor did it allow its owners to sign players to anything outside of standard NHL contracts, but the WHA had no rules barring such signings of its own accord. Skalbania signed Gretzky to a personal services contract so that he would retain the rights to the teenaged superstar, even if the WHA had folded outright. He knew the Racers would not be part of any merger, but he hoped to keep them alive just long enough to reap a major windfall from selling the highly touted Gretzky's rights to someone else in the NHL. He also hoped to get compensation from the teams included in the merger as well.

Gretzky only played eight games for the Racers during that time. Skalbania ultimately could not meet his obligations (thus leading to his own team's demise) and opted to sell Gretzky's contract to Oilers owner Peter Pocklington instead. Unlike Skalbania, Pocklington was better financed at the time and owned a team that was much better supported and thus, more reasonably stable by WHA standards, and were all but certain to be part of a merger deal with the NHL.

The two leagues eventually reached an agreement in March 1979 to grant expansion franchises in four of the WHA's cities, pending ratification by the NHL's owners. The NHL originally wanted to take in the New England Whalers, Winnipeg Jets, and Edmonton Oilers. The owners of the Cincinnati Stingers and Birmingham Bulls were resigned to their exclusion from the NHL, but the Quebec Nordiques fought the proposal themselves. The NHL's American teams were less enthusiastic about including Quebec than they were about including Edmonton and Winnipeg, and Ziegler thought that the Canadiens might be more persuaded to support an agreement that excluded the Nordiques outright.

Nevertheless, the WHA insisted on NHL franchises for all three of its surviving Canadian markets, which Ziegler finally agreed to put the matter to a vote for the NHL's Board of Governors. At a March 8, 1979 meeting in Key Largo, Florida, 12 of the 17 owners supported the proposal—one short of the required three-fourths majority (13 teams out of 17 would have represented 76.5% of the league, just past the threshold stipulated in the NHL constitution to grant expansion franchises. As the initial vote stood, it only represented 70.6% of the league, denying the vote to go through). The five teams that voted against the agreement in question for the first vote were the Montreal Canadiens, Vancouver Canucks, Boston Bruins, Toronto Maple Leafs, and Los Angeles Kings.

The five teams that cast a "no" ballot all did so for different reasons. The Bruins were not pleased with the prospect of sharing the New England market with the Whalers, while the Canadiens were even less enamored with having to share the province of Quebec with the Nordiques themselves. The Canadiens, Canucks, and Maple Leafs also disliked the idea of having to split Hockey Night in Canada revenues six ways rather than three ways, while the Canucks and Kings had feared the loss of dates with NHL teams from the east. Maple Leafs' owner Ballard also had a personal grudge in mind as well; he had never forgiven the WHA for plundering his roster back in the early 1970s.

The Canadiens were owned by Molson Brewery, and when news emerged that the Canadiens had voted against the deal, fans within Edmonton, Winnipeg, and Quebec City organized a boycott of Molson-owned products, believing that Molson Brewery was standing in the way of their cities remaining big-league hockey towns. The boycott quickly spread nationwide. It had also caused a drain on the Canucks' revenue as well, since Pacific Coliseum sold Molson products themselves. The House of Commons of Canada weighed in as well, unanimously passing a motion urging the NHL to reconsider the original expansion vote. A second vote was held in Chicago on March 22, 1979, which passed by a 14–3 margin as both Montreal and Vancouver reversed their positions following the boycott of Molson-owned products. Both teams' hands were forced by the boycott, with the Canucks also being won over by the promise of a more balanced schedule, with each team playing the others twice at home and twice on the road going forward.

The agreement resulted in the Oilers, Whalers, Nordiques, and Jets joining the NHL for the 1979–80 NHL season, increasing the league's membership to 21 teams following the prior merger between the Barons and North Stars franchises. The NHL, however, insisted on treating the WHA teams' arrival as an expansion, not a merger, and refused to recognize the WHA's records in the process. The four new NHL franchises were regarded as new entities, not as continuations of the former WHA franchises. From the NHL's perspective, the admission of former WHA organizations was no different than earlier enfranchisements involving cities with existing minor league organizations that were absorbed by incoming NHL franchises (for example, the purchase of the Vancouver Canucks of the Western Hockey League by the NHL Canucks in 1970).

The WHA teams each had to pay a $6 million franchise fee for their rights to enter the NHL, and were responsible for indemnifying both the Stingers and Bulls. However, since this was nominally the same fee paid by all of the other teams that joined the NHL back in the 1970s (a decade of high inflation), even with the indemnities in mind, the financial terms of the agreement were nominally favorable to the WHA. Although some of the teams that joined earlier in the decade received concessions on their fees, even after compensating both the cities of Cincinnati and Birmingham, the incoming teams paid less than half of the $16 million a Calgary-based group headed by Skalbania would pay for the Atlanta Flames to move to Calgary just one year later.

The four surviving WHA teams paid both the Stingers and Bulls $1.5 million apiece in parachute payments. Cincinnati and Birmingham and joined the Central Hockey League, the league-owned minor league, for one season each. The Stingers folded after 33 games played, while the Bulls played two full seasons before folding operations themselves. Major pro hockey has yet to return to Cincinnati or Birmingham, though the NHL did place teams in their nearby markets of Columbus and Nashville by the late 1990s.

The rest of the agreement was slanted heavily in the NHL's favor. The NHL held a reclamation draft for the established clubs, in which nearly all of the players who had bolted from the NHL and were still active in the WHA saw their rights revert to their NHL clubs without compensation. The WHA clubs were thus stripped of almost all of their players and had to rebuild their rosters from scratch. By comparison, when the American Football League (AFL) merged with NFL in 1970, it did so as a full partner with all of its teams intact and its records fully integrated. Also by way of comparison, when four of the six surviving teams from the ABA joined the NBA in 1976, they were allowed to keep almost all of their players despite them being regarded as NBA expansion teams instead of utilizing the NFL's merger method with the AFL.

In one of the few concessions to the WHA teams, however, they were allowed to protect two goalies and two skaters. Some less formal exceptions were also made, in particular for aging players: hockey legends Gordie Howe and Dave Keon were allowed to remain with the Whalers as opposed to return to the Red Wings and Maple Leafs respectively, while Bobby Hull was allowed to remain with the Jets rather than return to the Black Hawks - Hull would later be traded from the Jets to the Whalers and play on the same line as Howe and Keon during the 1979–80 season.

Even more controversial was the NHL's insistence that the four new teams were to be placed at the bottom of the draft order for the 1979 NHL entry draft. Historically, the NHL slotted expansion teams either at or near the top in an entry draft. In what was not a complete coincidence, the NHL also lowered the draft age to nineteen, effectively doubling the size and depth of the talent pool within the 1979 draft. Ostensibly, this was done in exchange for the Oilers being allowed to protect Gretzky from being taken by another NHL team. Under the rules of the time, Gretzky would have been placed in the NHL's entry draft. However, Gretzky made it clear he was not willing to void his personal services contract, especially given the likelihood he would be selected by the moribund Colorado Rockies (who would have presumably drafted Gretzky with the first overall pick had they been given the opportunity to do so). Gretzky was still only eighteen years old at the time, but was allowed to join the NHL with the Oilers on account of his prior professional experience in the WHA. As a player joining from another professional league, however, Gretzky was deemed ineligible for the league's Calder Memorial Trophy, which is awarded each year to the league's top rookie.

The former WHA teams were restocked via the 1979 NHL expansion draft with the established NHL teams receiving $125,000 per player taken in that draft. This compensation, however, formed a part of the former WHA teams' $6 million franchise fees. Additionally, a good number of players on the list were either retired or of little value for each squad; years later, Oilers general manager/coach Glen Sather said that the WHA teams knew this would have happened, but went along with it anyway for their own survival.

The Canadian teams were also permitted to operate under their established names, colors, logos and front office personnel. To appease the Bruins, however, the NHL insisted that the Whalers drop the general "New England" location from their name and enter the league as the "Hartford Whalers" instead. The NHL continues to recognize all four franchises as having been founded on June 22, 1979, which is also the date the WHA and its six remaining teams are reckoned to have formally ceased to exist, with the four WHA teams that essentially relocated to the NHL effectively replacing their original WHA team operations.

== Aftermath ==
The NHL had originally intended to place its four newest franchises in each of its four divisions—then called the Adams, Norris, Patrick and Smythe—but the Oilers and Jets lobbied to be placed in the same division as the Canucks. The league agreed, although its decision to play a balanced league-wide schedule rendered the divisional alignment in question irrelevant for the next two seasons. Nevertheless, the divisions were formally retained as such.

Although the WHA clubs had performed quite well against their NHL rivals in interleague exhibition games—out of 63 such games played, the WHA won 34, lost 22 and tied 7 matches—they were nevertheless expected to struggle on the ice after joining the NHL due to the effective purging of their rosters. However, the NHL also expanded the Stanley Cup playoffs from 12 teams to 16 instead, which allowed the Whalers and Oilers to qualify for the playoffs in their first NHL seasons; both teams were later swept in the first round. The following year, the Oilers stunned NHL loyalists when they swept the heavily favored Canadiens in the first round.

The addition of three new NHL teams in Canada led the league to reconsider other Canadian cities it had previously rejected placing franchises in at the time. One year after the 1979 expansion, the Atlanta Flames relocated their franchise to Calgary, becoming Albertan archrivals of the Oilers in the process.

The final chapter of the 1979 expansion arguably took place in 1983 instead when Bill Hunter, the original owner of the WHA Oilers, reached an agreement with St. Louis Blues owners Ralston Purina to purchase the Blues and relocate that team to his hometown area of Saskatoon, Saskatchewan. Despite obtaining more than 18,000 commitments for season tickets, this bid was met with universal hostility from NHL owners. Although Hunter insisted such a franchise would be viable on the basis of being supported by the whole Saskatchewan province (similar to the Saskatchewan Roughriders football team), Saskatoon itself was only a fraction of the size of any other NHL city in mind. The owners of the Oilers, Flames, and Jets were particularly opposed since Saskatchewan had become an important secondary market for all of them in terms of their television revenues, merchandise sales, and even gate receipts, although they were more reluctant than other owners to say so publicly so as not to alienate those same fans in question. The Nordiques were still owned by Carling O'Keefe (which at the time owned a brewery in Saskatoon) and also kept silent to avoid triggering a 1979-like boycott. As this was occurring, the final installments of the 1979 expansion fees were coming due. To minimize public support for the bid, Ziegler arranged to defer receipt of the fees from the Canadian teams until after the Board of Governors vote, ostensibly making the Oilers, Jets and Nordiques "ineligible" to vote on Hunter's bid so that they did not have to make their position officially known on a bid they had all privately opposed. The Canadiens, seeing no point in provoking another boycott by opposing a doomed bid, voted in favor, as did the Flames for a total of three votes in favor (including the Blues) against 15 opposed (including the Whalers). Eventually, Harry Ornest took over the team to keep the team in St. Louis.

In 1992, the NHL added an expansion franchise in Ottawa, in effect soft-reviving the original Senators franchise that was a charter member of the NHL until 1934. That team moved to St. Louis, but folded after just one season there. The league, however, rejected a similar bid to expand to Hamilton, which would have been projected to also soft-revive the Hamilton Tigers franchise, who had previously been in the NHL during the early 1920s. A bid from Saskatoon during this round of expansion was also withdrawn before the final decision was made.

== Legacy ==
In its seven seasons, the WHA paid its players $120 million and lost over $50 million in the process. The competition for talent introduced by the WHA, and accelerated by the signing of Bobby Hull, led to a rapid escalation of salaries for players within both leagues. For the first time, hockey players had meaningful leverage in contract negotiations. Moreover, in its search for talent, the WHA turned to the previously overlooked European market, signing players from places like Finland and Sweden instead of being more limited within North America. Anders Hedberg, Lars-Erik Sjoberg, and Ulf Nilsson all signed with the Jets in 1974 and thrived in North America, both in terms of the WHA and later entering the NHL. The Jets won three of the six remaining WHA playoff championships after they signed European players, and their success sparked similar signings league-wide. Many of these players went on to have NHL careers not long afterward.

Of the four teams that joined the NHL back in 1979, only the Edmonton Oilers remain in their original city today. Two franchises moved and acquired new names within three years of each other during the 1990s: first, the Nordiques became the Colorado Avalanche in 1995 and won the Stanley Cup in their first season in Denver; and the Whalers finally became the Carolina Hurricanes in 1997. The Oilers nearly followed the other three teams south themselves the following year after financially strapped owner Peter Pocklington received an offer from Leslie Alexander (owner of the NBA's Houston Rockets) to move the Oilers to Houston – itself not only a former WHA city, but one which was widely expected to keep the team's nickname due to Houston's well-established history with the Oilers name. However, the Edmonton Investors Group, led by Cal Nichols, was able to keep the team safe in Edmonton. The Oilers were eventually acquired by Edmonton-based billionaire Daryl Katz, who became the sole owner of the franchise in 2008. In 2016, the Oilers opened their new arena, Rogers Place, replacing Northlands Coliseum, which had been their home since 1974.

Of the three cities to have lost their WHA/NHL teams, only Winnipeg has received one back when the Atlanta Thrashers (enfranchised in 1999) relocated there in 2011. The original Jets had initially relocated to become the Phoenix Coyotes in 1996. However, in 2026, the NHL revised the historical records of the Jets franchise, transferring the pre-1996 records of the original Jets from the Coyotes to the current-day Jets/Thrashers franchise. Thus, the Jets were now considered inactive from 1996 to 1999 while the Coyotes were now treated as an expansion team.

The Oilers are also the only WHA team to win the Stanley Cup while staying in their WHA city, which they have done on five occasions—1984, 1985, 1987, 1988, and 1990. The Avalanche won the Stanley Cup in 1996, which was their first season after leaving Quebec City, and have since won Cup championships in 2001 and 2022. The Hurricanes have won the Stanley Cup in 2006 and 2026. Finally, the Jets franchise had never appeared in the Stanley Cup Final, and advanced to the second playoff round four times (1985, 1987, 2021, 2025) and the conference finals once (2018).

Notwithstanding the NHL's non-recognition of WHA records, all four surviving WHA teams subsequently retired at least one jersey number in recognition of on-ice endeavors achieved exclusively or primarily within the WHA. The three teams that re-located in the 1990s took different approaches with respect to the retired numbers – both Colorado and Carolina disclaimed their teams' pre-relocation histories in both the WHA and NHL and re-entered all previously retired numbers into circulation, regardless of leagues played (although notably, the Hurricanes have never issued the No. 9 that was worn by Gordie Howe and retired by the Whalers). The Coyotes previously decided to hang all of the previously retired Jets' numbers in the rafters including, notably, the No. 9 of Bobby Hull, notwithstanding the fact Hull only played 18 games for the Jets in their first NHL season (which was also the last season of his career). In doing so, the Coyotes implicitly recognized the Winnipeg Jets' entire history from 1972 to 1996 as their own. The Coyotes later temporarily un-retired No. 9 so Hull's son Brett could wear it for the final five games of his NHL career. By the time the NHL returned to Winnipeg, the league had taken over the Coyotes following bankruptcy from that general period of time and had even entertained an offer from the eventual Thrashers' purchasers to return the Coyotes to Manitoba. The league therefore had to decide whether to allow the former Thrashers to reclaim both of the Winnipeg Jets' name and prior team history. From 2011 to 2026, the NHL allowed Winnipeg to reclaim its former name, but not its pre-1996 history. The pre-1996 Jets history remained with the Arizona franchise while the Winnipeg franchise retained the Thrashers' history; aside from Gretzky's No. 99 that was retired league-wide in 2000, the Thrashers did not officially retire any numbers while in Atlanta, though they did remove No. 37 from circulation following the death of Dan Snyder. (The number, with Snyder's family's blessing, returned to circulation in 2016 for the Jets with Connor Hellebuyck currently wearing the number.) The "new" Jets immediately and controversially recognized the league's decision by issuing No. 9 to Evander Kane, who had worn the same number while with the Thrashers. In 2014, after the Coyotes changed their geographical identifier from Phoenix to Arizona, they returned all of the numbers retired from the original Jets era to circulation, reclassifying them as "honored numbers" onto the Arizona Coyotes' Ring of Honor, with Shane Doan being the only player to have his number retired by the franchise outside of No. 99 in the team's former head coach and team owner Wayne Gretzky. As for the modern-day Jets, they likewise honored players from the original Jets via the Winnipeg Jets Hall of Fame, before eventually reclaiming its pre-1996 statistics from the Coyotes in 2026. However, they have yet to decide if they would rededicate the uniform numbers that were retired by the original Jets.

On April 18, 2024, the Arizona Coyotes officially suspended operations as a franchise, with the team's hockey operations assets sold off to new ownership and effectively relocated to Salt Lake City to stock the Utah Hockey Club (now Utah Mammoth); the Utah club was treated as an expansion franchise for NHL records purposes. Under the terms of the agreement made with Coyotes owner Alex Meruelo, the franchise would have been reactivated if an NHL-ready arena had been built within five years. However, after the cancellation of an auction for a parcel of land that Meruelo intended to use to build that new arena in question, Meruelo ceded the franchise rights and intellectual property back to the NHL.

== See also ==
- Timeline of the National Hockey League
- History of the National Hockey League
- History of the National Hockey League (1967–1992)
