= Alberta Enterprise Group =

- Abbreviation: AEG
- Formation: 2007
- Type: Public policy advocacy group
- Location: Alberta, Canada
- President: Catherine Brownlee
- Website: AlbertaEnterpriseGroup.com

The Alberta Enterprise Group (AEG) is a member-based, non-profit business and corporate advocacy organization based in Alberta, Canada.

The organization's members collectively employ more than 150,000 people and generate billions in economic activity each year.

== Board of Directors ==
The Alberta Enterprise Group's Board of Directors is mainly composed of prominent executives from oil and gas corporations in Alberta. As of July 2023, the Board was composed of:

AEG Board of Directors
Name	Role	Background
Catherine Brownlee	President	Morrison Petroleum, McGavin Foods, Canadian Fracmaster, Dynafrac Well Services Ltd, Business Development Services at Golder, Campaign Manager for Wayne Stewart and Naheed Nenshi, Director of Community Relations at Coril Holdings, Ltd., Executive Director of the Alberta Party, CEO of Prominent Personnel, Ltd., Co-founder and Advisory Council to Defense Services, Inc., President and CEO of Catherine Brownlee Inc.
Herve Faucher	Chair	President of GMS Aggregates, Inc., Board Member of Goodfish Development Corporation.
Shane Wenzel	Board Member	CEO & President of Shane Homes Group of Companies, Opinion Columnist for Western Standard, Monthly Contributor for Business in Calgary Magazine, Board Member of Cal Wenzel Family Foundation, Board Member of Business and Land Development Association (BILD) Calgary Region, Board Member of Teck Resources, Ltd. Involvement in 'Operation Peacock', a failed attempt to entrap Mayor Nenshi and get him removed as Mayor.
Terry O'Flynn	Ex-Chair	Telford Valve & Specialties, Board Member of Alpine Canada, Ex-Chair for The Mustard Seed's Annual Golf Tournament, Board Member of Edmonton Oilers Community Foundation, Board Member at Edmonton Elks Football Club, Co-Chair of IIHF Hockey Canada, Board Member of Jerry Forbes Centre for Community Spirit, President of Prism Flow Products, Inc., Director of Fieldhouse Capital Management, Committee Chair for 2023 NHL Heritage Classic.
Cal Nichols	Chairman Emeritus, Co-Founder of AEG	Co-Founder of Northridge Petroleum Marketing Inc., Founder of Gasland Oil Ltd., Chair of Esso Agents Prairie Region Advisory Board, Founding Partner and Chair of Edmonton Investors Group.
David Martens	Board Member	"An engaged and vocal advocate for reducing unnecessary regulatory red-tape[...] and advocating for Alberta's oil and gas industry."
James Rajotte	Past Board Member	Conservative Member of Parliament for Edmonton-Southwest and Edmonton-Leduc, Vice-President of Provincial and Municipal Government Relations of Rogers Communications, Alberta's Senior Representative to the United States in Washington, D.C.
Bruce Pennock	Auditor	Partner at Deloitte, Partner at Pennock Acheson Nielsen Devaney LLP, Board Director of Royal Alexandra Hospital Foundation, Board Director of Melcor Developments Ltd., Trustee of Franciscan Friars of Western Canada.
Tim Shipton	Vice-Chair	GM of GLG Consulting Ltd., Executive Vice-President of Oilers Entertainment Group. Vocal supporter of the Canadian military and advocate for oil and gas companies.
Steven Kim	Executive Committee	Investment Advisor at Bank of Montreal Nesbitt Burns, Vice-President & Investment Advisor at RBC Dominion Securities.
Branko Culo	Board Member	Vice-President of Specialized Recruiting Group (Express Employment International), Club Member of Rotary Club.
Donna Neumann	Board Member	President of Windowpane Management Inc., Board Member of Alzheimers Society of Alberta and Northwest Territories
Bruno Muller	Board Member	President & Co-Owner of Caron Transportation Systems, Caron Transportation Systems USA, and Interload Services Ltd., Chair of Canadian Trucking Alliance.
Peter Kiss	Board Member	President & CEO of Morgan Construction and Environmental Ltd., Ex-Chair/Ex-Director of Canadian Energy Executive Association (CEEA), Board Member of Young Presidents' Organization (YPO), Board Member of Edmonton Economic Development Corporation.

== History ==
In 2006 a group of Alberta business leaders came together to form a fundraising/political action group called Grassroots Leadership Group. The group unsuccessfully supported Mark Norris on the first ballot in his Progressive Conservative Association of Alberta leadership bid. After Norris dropped off the ballot, the group supported eventual winner Ed Stelmach on the second ballot.

After the PC leadership process, Grassroots Leadership Group members decided to keep the group together as a business advocacy organization and re-branded as Alberta Enterprise Group, headed by then-Chairman Cal Nichols.

In the early days the organization was led by Tim Shipton until his departure to join the Oilers Entertainment Group (OEG). Tim Shipton was previously director of the Progressive Conservative Association of Alberta.

In February, 2019 the organization announced the appointment of John Liston as President. In June, 2019 Danielle Smith was the President.

== Activities ==
The organization has conducted several meetings over the years trying to draw more business to Canada. In 2008 AEG brought 100 of the province's business leaders to Washington D.C. to meet with congressional leaders and United States business leaders. Then in 2009 the organization brought more than 60 of the province's business leaders to Geneva, Switzerland in an effort to showcase Alberta to the European investment community. In both 2008 and 2009 the organization brought more than 150 businessmen and politicians from across North America to tour the oil sands mining operations. Participants visited Syncrude, Albian and CNRL's Horizon Mine.

In the spring of 2010, AEG organized the Alberta Connects outreach mission to Ottawa. Alberta Connects introduced AEG members to Prime Minister Stephen Harper, Finance Minister Flaherty, Environment Minister Prentice, Liberal Leader Michael Ignatieff and 55 other Members of Parliament and Senators.

In 2011, the group returned to Washington, D.C. to engage U.S political leaders in a discussion on improving trade relations between Canada and the United States and ensuring market access for Canadian energy. In 2012, the group brought a delegation of 40 business leaders to Quebec to meet with business and political leaders in that province, purportedly to improve trade ties between the two provinces.

The organization is a strong proponent of what it calls "sustainable resource development," arguing that impediments to resource development imposed by excessive regulation hurt the Canadian economy and government revenues.

The group has also been engaged in the discussion on Alberta's provincial budget, advocating spending restraint as opposed to tax increases to address a growing government deficit.

=== Opposition to corporation and business taxes ===
In April 2015, during the 2015 Alberta general election the group released a study arguing that increasing business taxes would kill jobs and investment, increase consumer prices and reduce wages for workers.

=== Labour Reform ===
The organization has also published information regarding collective bargaining. In December 2009 AEG released a study calling for reforms to provincial labour laws, hoping to create good business climates while upholding the collective bargaining rights of workers. The paper argued that the Canada's labour laws lag behind Europe, Australia and the United Kingdom. Some of the recommendations in the study included: having membership cards instead of signing petitions; requiring a quorum, and allowing unionized workers in Alberta be allowed opt out of the portion of their union dues that is spent on lobbying and political activities. The organization supported enacting a Worker Free Choice Act (WFCA) to which would allow workers the right to choose whether or not to join or financially support a union as a condition of employment. Bob Barnetson, who is an associate professor of labour relations at Athabasca University, spoke out against the study's conclusions and how it was conducted. However, the study was endorsed by the Merit Contractors Association, Canadian Constitution Foundation and the Canadian Federation of Independent Business. A survey conducted by AEG also found that 65 percent believed 70 percent of employees should vote to certify or decertify a union. The poll also found that 78 percent agreed that union dues should only be spent on collective bargaining and union management instead of policy influence.

=== Oil sands ===
Im May 2011 AEG went to Washington, D.C. to talk about borders security, energy development and trade. Participants met with Members of the U.S. House of Representatives and Senate to discuss the pending decision on the Keystone XL pipeline. The meetings noted that tar sands knowledge had increased, discussed Canada's commitment to its environment and the benefits of the oil sands to America. In December 2011, AEG led a counter-boycott of Chiquita Bananas in response to the company signing on to an anti-oil sands campaign coordinated by California-based environmental advocacy group Forest Ethics. Chiquita later said that it would continue to use Canadian oil. Levi-Strauss and Timberland were also targeted by AEG in the boycott of the boycotters, but were later taken down from the page after the companies said they would not boycott Canadian oil.

== See also ==
- Economy of Alberta
- Petroleum industry in Canada
- Athabasca oil sands
- Imperial Oil
- Environmental issues in Alberta
- Energy Alberta Corporation
