= Bruce Saville =

Bruce Saville may refer to:

- Bruce Saville (sculptor) (1893–1938), American sculptor
- Bruce Saville (businessman) (1944–2025), Canadian businessman and philanthropist
