= List of all-time NHL standings =

The following is a list of the all-time records for each of the 32 active National Hockey League (NHL) teams, beginning with the first NHL season (1917–18), with regular season stats accurate as of the end the 2025–26 season, and playoff stats accurate as of the end of the 2026 Stanley Cup playoffs. Teams are sorted by the overall percentage of points accumulated out of points available (two times the number of games played) throughout NHL history.

In the NHL's points system, a team is awarded 2 points for a win (regardless if earned in regulation, overtime or shootout), 1 point for a tie, 1 point for an overtime loss, and 0 points for a regulation loss. The overtime loss statistic (abbreviated as OL, OT, or OTL) was introduced into the NHL's points system in the 1999–2000 season. A commonly used term for the point awarded to a team for an overtime loss is a loser point. As a result of the 2004–05 NHL lockout, which canceled the entire 2004–05 season, the league adopted a shootout to determine the winner of a game which is still tied after an overtime period. This feature, introduced in the 2005–06 season, eliminated ties from the game.

== Regular season ==
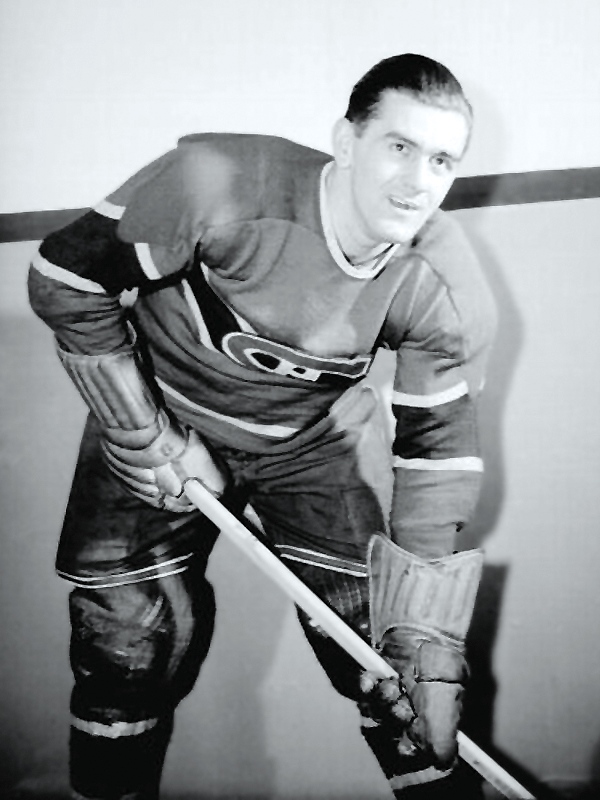
Maurice Richard of the Montreal Canadiens, the NHL leading team in terms of games, wins, ties and points as of the end of the 2023–24 season.

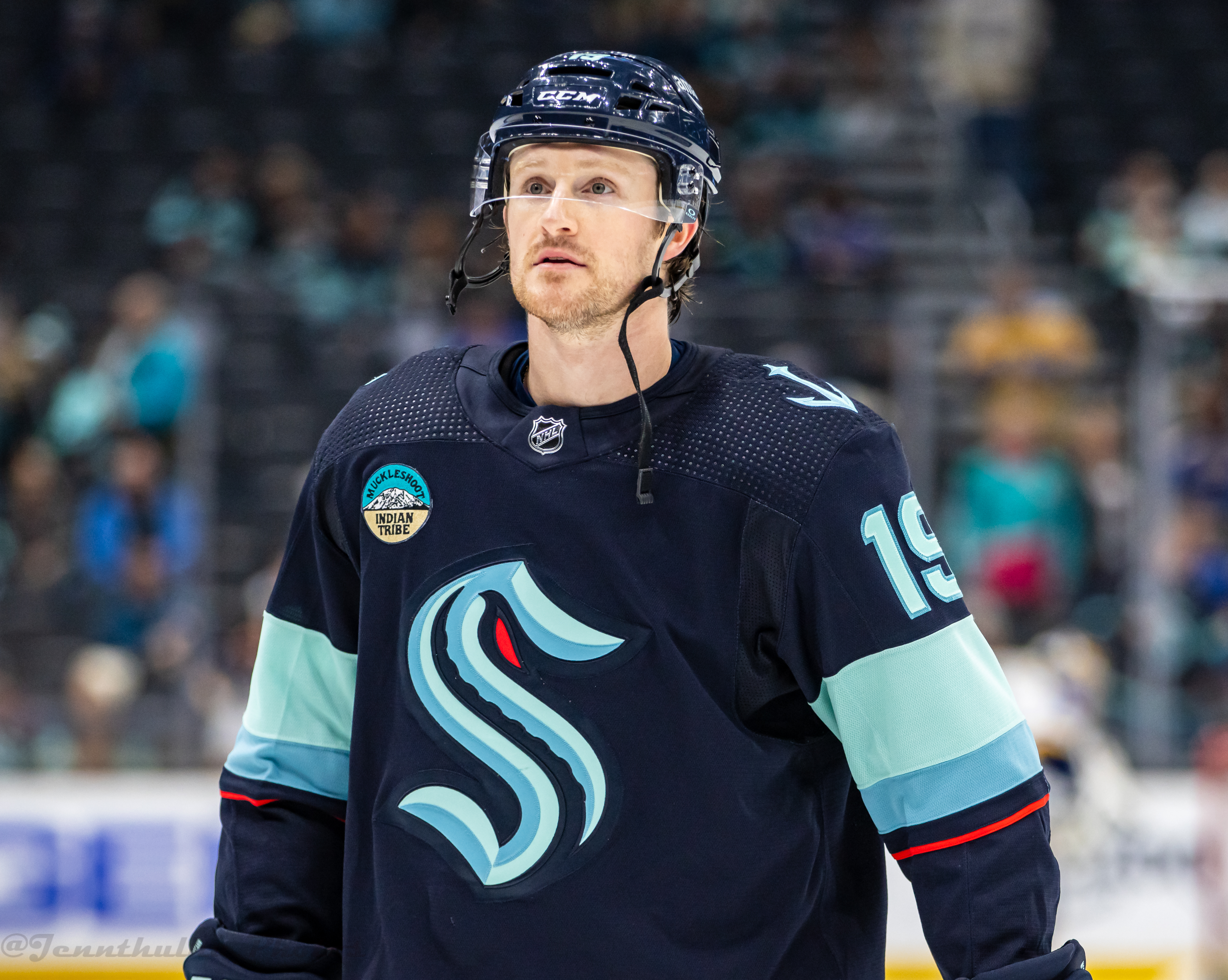
Jared McCann of the Seattle Kraken, the franchise with the lowest points percentage as of the end of the 2023–24 season, among active NHL teams.

As of the end of the 2025–26 NHL regular season, the Montreal Canadiens have the most games played with 7,197. The Toronto Maple Leafs were formerly tied with the Canadiens, as both teams are the two surviving franchises from the NHL's inaugural 1917–18 NHL season. A one-game discrepancy between the Canadiens and Leafs occurred during the 2019–20 season, as a mid-season suspension resulting from the onset of the COVID-19 pandemic caused teams to play a different number of games. The Canadiens additionally lead all NHL franchises in wins (3,644), ties (837), and points (8,354). The Chicago Blackhawks lead all NHL franchises in losses (2,990), while the Philadelphia Flyers have recorded the most overtime losses (240). Being the most recently established NHL team, the Utah Mammoth have the fewest games played (164), wins (81), losses (64), overtime losses (19), and points (181). The Mammoth, as well as the Vegas Golden Knights and Seattle Kraken were established after the NHL eliminated ties, and as such have the fewest ties recorded. The Golden Knights have the highest point percentage among active NHL teams (.626), while the Kraken have the lowest (.483).

Rank	Team	First NHL season	GP	W	L	T	OL	Points	PTS%	Ref.
1	Vegas Golden Knights	2017–18	701	401	224	–	76	878	.626	
2	Montreal Canadiens	1917–18	7,197	3,644	2,487	837	229	8,354	.580	
3	Boston Bruins	1924–25	7,036	3,482	2,527	791	236	7,991	.568	
4	Philadelphia Flyers	1967–68	4,581	2,249	1,635	457	240	5,195	.567	
5	Minnesota Wild	2000–01	1,977	988	734	55	200	2,231	.564	
6	Nashville Predators	1998–99	2,141	1,054	826	60	201	2,369	.553	
7	Utah Mammoth	2024–25	164	81	64	–	19	181	.552	
8	Colorado Avalanche (Note: The Colorado Avalanche first played in 1972–73 as the Quebec Nordiques in the World Hockey Association (WHA). Their WHA records accumulated prior to the 1979 NHL–WHA merger are not officially accounted for by the NHL. After the merger, the team would continue playing as the Quebec Nordiques from 1979–80 to 1994–95. The team has played as the Colorado Avalanche since their relocation to Colorado prior to the 1995–96 season.)	1979–80	3,644	1,765	1,440	261	178	3,969	.545	
9	Calgary Flames (Note: The Calgary Flames first played as the Atlanta Flames from 1972–73 to 1979–80, before adopting the Calgary Flames name in 1980–81, upon their relocation to Calgary.)	1972–73	4,200	1,966	1,649	379	206	4,517	.538	
10	Washington Capitals	1974–75	4,043	1,913	1,613	303	214	4,343	.537	
11	St. Louis Blues	1967–68	4,583	2,139	1,801	432	211	4,921	.537	
12	Edmonton Oilers (Note: The Edmonton Oilers first played in 1972–73 as the Alberta Oilers in the World Hockey Association (WHA). The team adopted the Edmonton Oilers name in 1973–74. Their WHA records accumulated prior to the 1979 NHL–WHA merger are not officially accounted for by the NHL. After the merger, the team has kept playing with this name.)	1979–80	3,645	1,706	1,473	262	204	3,878	.532	
13	Buffalo Sabres	1970–71	4,355	2,004	1,735	409	207	4,624	.531	
14	Detroit Red Wings (Note: The Detroit Red Wings first played as the Detroit Cougars from 1926–27 to 1929–30, and as the Detroit Falcons from 1930–31 to 1931–32, before adopting the Red Wings name in 1932–33.)	1926–27	6,971	3,177	2,749	815	230	7,399	.531	
15	Dallas Stars (Note: The Dallas Stars first played as the Minnesota North Stars from 1967–68 to 1992–93. They have played as the Dallas Stars since their relocation to Dallas prior to the 1993–94 season.)	1967–68	4,581	2,087	1,826	459	209	4,842	.528	
16	Tampa Bay Lightning	1992–93	2,604	1,224	1,082	112	186	2,746	.523	
17	Florida Panthers	1993–94	2,519	1,128	1,013	142	236	2,634	.523	
18	Pittsburgh Penguins	1967–68	4,581	2,102	1,883	383	213	4,800	.522	
19	Anaheim Ducks (Note: The Anaheim Ducks first played as the Mighty Ducks of Anaheim from 1993–94 to 2005–06, before adopting the Anaheim Ducks name in 2006–07.)	1993–94	2,521	1,149	1,038	107	227	2,632	.522	
20	Toronto Maple Leafs (Note: The Toronto Maple Leafs first played without an official nickname and were referred to as the Toronto Hockey Club during the 1917–18 season, before being formally dubbed the Toronto Arenas, a name the team would play under during the 1918–19 season. The team then played as the Toronto St. Patricks from 1919–20 to 1926–27. Since the 1927–28 season, the team has played with the Maple Leafs name.)	1917–18	7,196	3,234	2,959	783	220	7,471	.519	
21	New York Rangers	1926–27	6,970	3,110	2,860	808	192	7,220	.518	
22	New York Islanders	1972–73	4,198	1,884	1,749	347	218	4,333	.516	
23	San Jose Sharks	1991–92	2,684	1,202	1,140	121	221	2,746	.512	
24	Ottawa Senators	1992–93	2,605	1,169	1,115	115	206	2,659	.510	
25	Carolina Hurricanes (Note: The Carolina Hurricanes first played in 1972–73 as the New England Whalers in the World Hockey Association (WHA). They relocated to Hartford in 1974, but kept the New England Whalers name. Their WHA records are not officially accounted for by the NHL. When the NHL and WHA merged in 1979, the team was renamed as the Hartford Whalers, which they would play as from 1979–80 to 1996–97. The team has played as the Carolina Hurricanes since their relocation to North Carolina prior to the 1997–98 season.)	1979–80	3,642	1,619	1,550	263	210	3,711	.509	
26	Los Angeles Kings	1967–68	4,582	1,972	1,960	424	226	4,594	.501	
27	Chicago Blackhawks (Note: The Chicago Blackhawks' team name was spelled as "Black Hawks" from 1926–27 to 1985–86, and prior to the 1986–87 season, the name was officially changed to the compound "Blackhawks" spelling.)	1926–27	6,970	2,943	2,990	814	223	6,923	.497	
28	New Jersey Devils (Note: The New Jersey Devils first played as the Kansas City Scouts from 1974–75 to 1975–76. The team then relocated to Denver and played as the Colorado Rockies from 1976–77 to 1981–82. After relocating from Denver to New Jersey, the team has played as the New Jersey Devils since the 1982–83 season.)	1974–75	4,043	1,735	1,779	328	201	3,999	.495	
29	Vancouver Canucks	1970–71	4,355	1,840	1,915	391	209	4,280	.494	
30	Columbus Blue Jackets	2000–01	1,978	847	890	33	208	1,935	.489	
31	Winnipeg Jets (Note: The Winnipeg Jets first played in 1972–73 in the World Hockey Association (WHA). Their WHA records accumulated prior to the 1979 NHL–WHA merger are not officially accounted for by the NHL. The franchise was deactivated after the 1995–96 season with its hockey operations relocating to Phoenix as the Coyotes. The Jets franchise was reactivated when the NHL expanded with the Atlanta Thrashers and played in Atlanta from 1999–2000 to 2010–11. The team has played as the Winnipeg Jets since their relocation to Winnipeg prior to the 2011–12 season. In 2026, the NHL consolidated the Jets' franchise records from 1972 to 1996 with the modern Jets and Thrashers records.)	1979–80	3,399	1,458	1,535	217	189	3,322	.489	
32	Seattle Kraken	2021–22	410	176	190	–	44	396	.483	

=== Defunct franchises ===
Several NHL teams have since gone defunct. Many of them played in the NHL eras between the ceasing of the National Hockey Association in 1918 and the beginning of the NHL's Original Six era. The latter ended with the 1967 NHL expansion, when six teams joined the league. Of these 1967 expansion teams, only the Oakland Seals (Note: The Cleveland Barons were one of the 1967 NHL expansion teams; they were originally a Western Hockey League (WHL) team and were absorbed into the NHL as a 1967 expansion team. At the time, they were named the California Seals, but were renamed as the Oakland Seals during their inaugural NHL season. They played under this name through 1970, before being renamed the Bay Area Seals. Just two games into the 1970–71 season, they were again renamed, this time as the California Golden Seals, which they played as through the 1975–76 season. The team then relocated and rebranded as the Cleveland Barons, which they played as for two seasons until folding after the 1977–78 season.) would later fold.

Among all defunct franchises, the Cleveland Barons recorded the most games played (858), losses (448), and ties (141). The Montreal Maroons recorded the most wins (271), while the New York Americans had the most points (637), and the original Ottawa Senators had the highest point percentage (.514). The Montreal Wanderers, having had their arena burn down during the first NHL season, have the fewest games played (6), wins (1), and points (2), as well as the lowest point percentage (.167). The Wanderers actually played just 4 of their 6 recorded games, as they defaulted two of them following their arena burning down but prior to their disbandment.

With the exception of the Arizona Coyotes, all now defunct NHL franchises folded prior to the advent of the NHL's overtime loss feature.

Rank	Team	Seasons in the NHL	GP	W	L	T	OTL	Points	PTS%	Ref.
1	Ottawa Senators (Note: Despite sharing a name with the active Ottawa Senators, this franchise's win–loss records and standings are separate. The original Senators relocated and were renamed the St. Louis Eagles for their 1934–35 season, which was their last.)	1917–1935	590	269	252	69	–	607	.514	
2	Montreal Maroons	1924–1938	622	271	260	91	–	633	.509	
3	Arizona Coyotes (Note: The Arizona Coyotes first played as the Phoenix Coyotes from 1996–97 to 2013–14, before adopting the Arizona Coyotes name in 2014–15.)	1996–2024	2,142	918	939	94	191	2,121	.495	
4	New York Americans (Note: The New York Americans operated as the Brooklyn Americans for one season: their 1941–42 season, which would be their last.)	1925–1942	784	255	402	127	–	637	.406	
5	Cleveland Barons	1967–1978	858	229	448	141	–	599	.366	
6	Hamilton Tigers (Note: The Hamilton Tigers began play as the Quebec Hockey Club in 1878. In 1919, then officially known as the Quebec Athletic Club but colloquially referred to as the Quebec Bulldogs, the club joined the NHL. After one season, they relocated and rebranded as the Hamilton Tigers, which they played as until the club folded following the 1924–25 NHL season.)	1919–1925	150	51	98	1	–	103	.343	
7	Pittsburgh Pirates (Note: The Pittsburgh Pirates were founded as the first incarnation of the Pittsburgh Yellow Jackets, originally an independent hockey team. They joined the NHL in 1925 as the Pittsburgh Pirates, before relocating and rebranding as the Philadelphia Quakers, which they played as during their final season from 1930–31.)	1925–1931	256	71	158	27	–	169	.330	
8	Montreal Wanderers (Note: The Montreal Wanderers were founded in 1903 as an amateur hockey team. After playing in amateur leagues, they joined the NHL ahead of the 1917–18 season. After playing only four games, their arena burned down. They defaulted their next two games before disbanding.)	1917–1918	6	1	5	0	–	2	.167	

== Playoffs ==
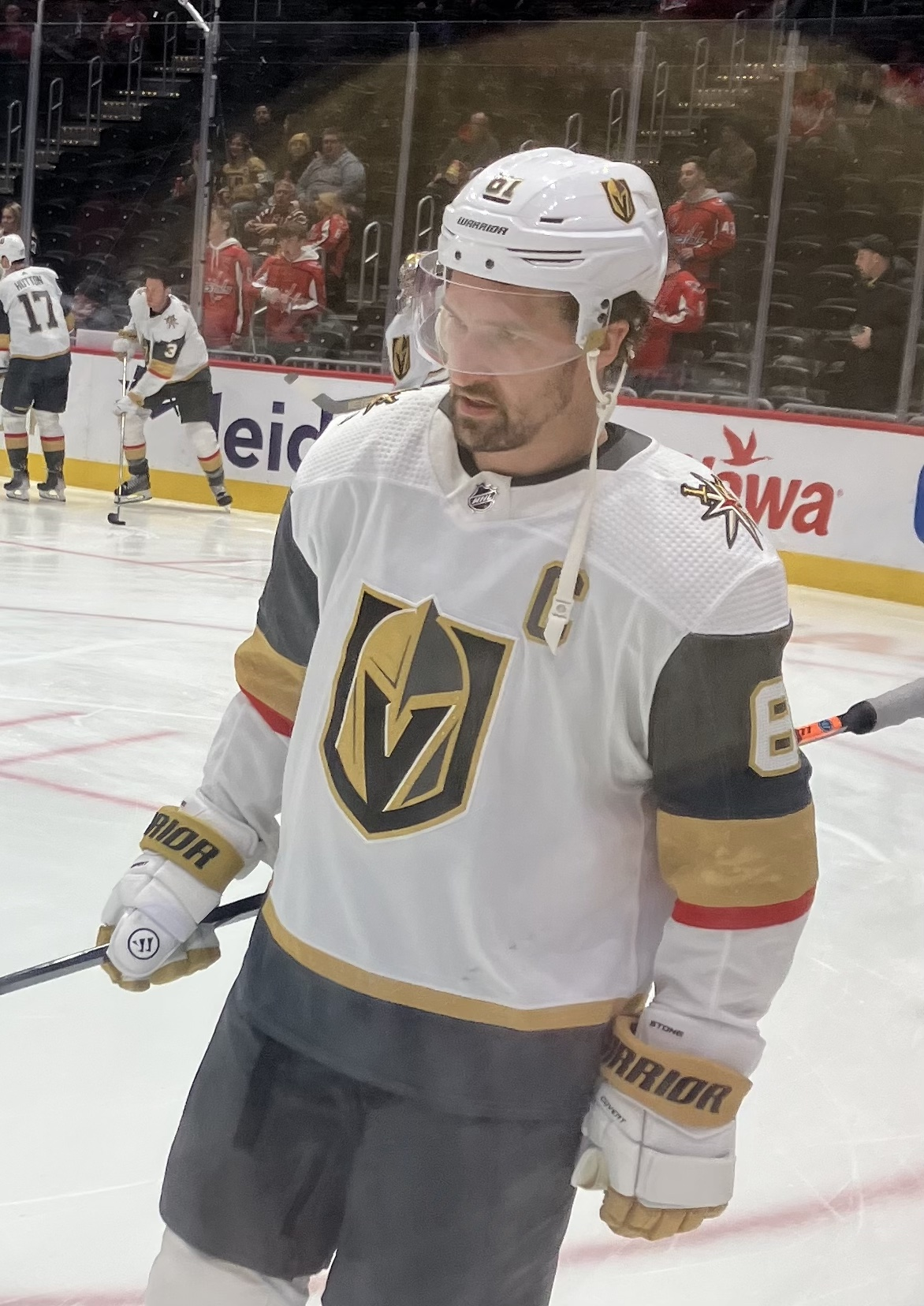
Mark Stone of the Vegas Golden Knights, who have the highest playoff winning percentage in NHL history as of the end of the 2025–26 season.

The Stanley Cup playoffs predate the National Hockey League's founding, and thus for the purpose of this listing, playoffs win–loss records prior to the 1918 Stanley Cup playoffs, which ended the 1917–18 NHL season, are not accounted for. As of the end of the 2026 Stanley Cup playoffs, which ended the 2025–26 NHL season, the Montreal Canadiens lead all active NHL teams in playoff appearances, having appeared in 87 of their 110 seasons played in the NHL, and playoff games played, with 792. The Canadiens additionally lead all NHL teams in wins (450). The Vegas Golden Knights lead all NHL teams, in terms of playoff winning percentage, as their 76–52 (.594) record is the highest. The Utah Mammoth have the fewest playoff games played (6) and the lowest playoff winning percentage (.333). Additionally, the Boston Bruins lead all NHL franchises in playoff losses (356).

Ties in the NHL playoffs are not able to occur under current rules, though all Original Six teams recorded at least one when ties were a possible playoff game result, with the last tie being between the Maple Leafs and the Bruins in 1951. The Canadiens and New York Rangers share the distinction of having the most playoff ties, with 8 each.

Overtime losses, not previously found in NHL playoff formats, were recorded during the 2020 Stanley Cup playoffs. As part of the NHL's response to the COVID-19 pandemic, that year implemented the Return to Play Plan, which involved a seeding round-robin qualifying round that recorded overtime losses. The Colorado Avalanche, St. Louis Blues, and Washington Capitals each recorded one overtime loss in the setting.

Rank	Team	Last playoffs appearance	GP	W	L	T	OL	Win%	Ref.
1	Vegas Golden Knights	2025–26	128	76	52	—	—	.594	
2	Edmonton Oilers	2025–26	353	205	148	—	—	.581	
3	Montreal Canadiens	2025–26	792	450	335	8	—	.567	
4	Tampa Bay Lightning	2025–26	231	128	103	—	—	.554	
5	Colorado Avalanche	2025–26	357	195	161	—	1	.546	
6	Anaheim Ducks	2025–26	174	95	79	—	—	.546	
7	New York Islanders	2023–24	324	175	149	—	—	.540	
8	Florida Panthers	2024–25	132	70	62	—	—	.530	
9	Pittsburgh Penguins	2025–26	404	214	190	—	—	.530	
10	Detroit Red Wings	2015–16	622	325	296	1	—	.523	
11	Carolina Hurricanes	2025–26	235	122	113	—	—	.519	
12	New Jersey Devils	2024–25	276	143	133	—	—	.518	
13	Philadelphia Flyers	2025–26	459	235	224	—	—	.512	
14	Dallas Stars	2025–26	435	219	216	—	—	.503	
15	Seattle Kraken	2022–23	14	7	7	—	—	.500	
16	San Jose Sharks	2018–19	241	119	122	—	—	.494	
17	Chicago Blackhawks	2019–20	548	268	275	5	—	.489	
18	Boston Bruins	2025–26	708	346	356	6	—	.489	
19	Buffalo Sabres	2025–26	269	131	138	—	—	.487	
20	New York Rangers	2023–24	561	267	286	8	—	.476	
21	Toronto Maple Leafs	2024–25	601	285	312	4	—	.474	
22	Ottawa Senators	2025–26	161	74	87	—	—	.460	
23	Washington Capitals	2024–25	316	145	170	—	1	.459	
24	Vancouver Canucks	2023–24	259	118	141	—	—	.456	
25	St. Louis Blues	2024–25	423	191	231	—	1	.452	
26	Calgary Flames	2021–22	250	110	140	—	—	.440	
27	Nashville Predators	2023–24	131	56	75	—	—	.427	
28	Los Angeles Kings	2025–26	283	119	164	—	—	.420	
29	Columbus Blue Jackets	2019–20	41	15	26	—	—	.366	
30	Winnipeg Jets	2024–25	124	43	81	—	—	.347	
31	Minnesota Wild	2025–26	107	37	70	—	—	.346	
32	Utah Mammoth	2025–26	6	2	4	–	–	.333	
