= ADC Telecommunications =

Defunct American company

ADC Telecommunications, Inc.
- Type: Public
- Traded as: Nasdaq: ADCT
- Industry: Communications Services
- Founded: 1935; 91 years ago, in Minneapolis, Minnesota
- Defunct: 2010 (acquisition completed)
- Fate: Acquired
- Successor: CommScope
- Headquarters: Harrisburg, Pennsylvania U.S.
- Key people: Eddie Edwards (president/CEO, CommScope)
- Products: Networking hardware, Wireless Coverage & Capacity, Telecommunications
- Revenue: ▲US$1.157 Billion (FY 2010)
- Operating income: ▲US$45.9 Million (FY 2010)
- Net income: ▲US$78.5 Million (FY 2010)
- Total assets: ▲US$1.475 Billion (FY 2010)
- Total equity: ▲US$429 Million (FY 2010)
- Number of employees: 9,300 (Sept 2010)
- Website: adc.com

ADC Telecommunications, Inc. was a communications company in Eden Prairie, Minnesota, a southwest suburb of Minneapolis. It was acquired by TE Connectivity (Tyco Electronics) in December 2010 and ceased to exist as a separate entity. ADC products were sold by CommScope after it acquired the Broadband Network Solutions business unit (including ADC) from TE Connectivity in August 2015.

== History ==
ADC Telecommunications was founded in 1935 in Minneapolis, Minnesota, by Ralph Allison and Walter Lehnert.

During their first year in business, ADC built hearing aids and audiometers—a machine used for evaluating hearing acuity. Initially the audiometers were built for Maico, but in 1945 ADC began building audiometers under its own name. Additionally, by 1942, the company had designed a sophisticated audio system for the University of Minnesota, and the resulting jacks, plugs, patch cords and jackfields became the cornerstones for ADC's later entry into telecommunications.

In 1949, ADC sold its audiometer product line and Ralph Allison left the company to form a new business in California. With Walter Lehnert remaining as president of the company, ADC diversified and focused its efforts in the area of transformers and filters for power lines, military electronics, telephone jacks and plugs.

In 1961, ADC merged with Magnetic Controls Company, a manufacturer of power supplies and magnetic amplifiers with strong ties to the U.S. space program. The resulting company, ADC Magnetic Controls, had a decade of mixed success. Although transformer sales boomed during the 1960s, other new product initiatives failed to materialize. Perhaps the most significant product innovation during this period was the bantam jack, a miniaturized component that eventually became the standard for telephone circuit access and patching. Building on its growing sales of jacks and plugs in the early 1970s, ADC introduced prewired, connectorized jackfields, wired assemblies and test equipment for telephone operating companies. By 1976, ADC had become the largest independent supplier of test boards in the United States.

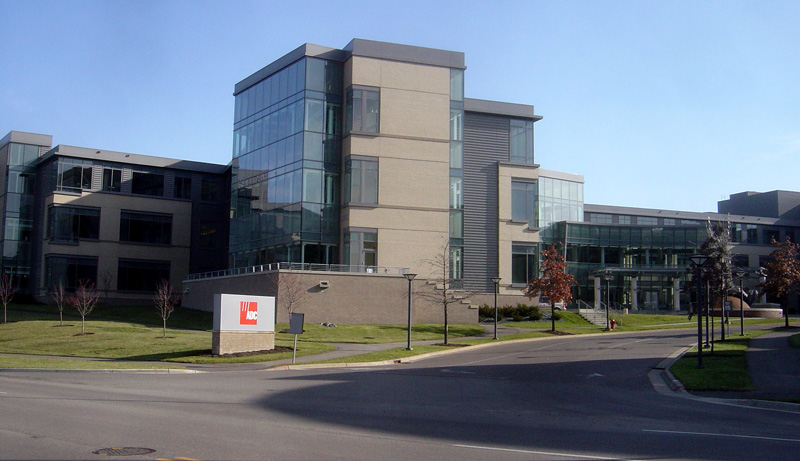
Former ADC headquarters complex in Eden Prairie, MN, USA. Now occupied by Optum Health

ADC grew in 1983, when AT&T was ordered to deregulate by the federal government. By establishing the seven Regional Bell Operating Company (RBOC) carriers as independent entities, the U.S. market for telecommunications expanded by 90 percent. ADC became a supplier for the RBOCs.

ADC embarked on some acquisitions in the early 1990s, attempting to move "up the stack" in the datacom field by acquiring companies that manufactured datacom equipment. However, their ability to find synergies between these companies proved limited and eventually ADC was forced to move away from a hardware-only strategy, broadening out into software. This effort resulted in limited success as well, and happening about the same time as the dot-com bubble burst, caused ADC stock to plummet.

ADC Telecommunications was acquired by Tyco Electronics in July 2010 for a reported $12.75 per share in cash, or an enterprise value of approximately $1.25 billion.

The acquisition of ADC by TE Connectivity was completed on December 9, 2010

On January 28, 2015, it was publicly announced that the boards of directors of both TE Connectivity and CommScope agreed for CommScope to purchase the Broadband Network Solutions business unit of TE Connectivity in an all-cash deal for US$3.0 billion. The former ADC is a part of this business unit. The purchase of the Broadband Network Solutions business was closed on August 31, 2015.

== Corporate acquisitions ==
The company acquired Telinq in 1990. In 1993, ADC acquired Fibermux Corp., a manufacturer of LAN Hubs and Data Multiplexers. ADC sold Kentrox to the private equity firm Platinum Equity, LLC in 2001.

ADC also acquired American Lightwave Systems, a manufacturer of uncompressed video transport equipment for telecom carriers. This division was later sold to C-COR Electronics.

In 1996, ADCT merged with ITS (Information Transmission Systems) but has since sold it off.

In May 1997, ADC Telecommunications signed a definitive agreement to acquire The Apex Group Inc., for approximately $26 million.

In 1999, the company acquired Canadian company Saville Systems. A year later, in May 2000, ADC purchased the Swedish-based company Altitun.

In 2000. ADC acquired PairGain Technologies Inc. for 1.6 billion USD in stocks.

In 2004, ADC acquired KRONE, a supplier of copper and fiber-based connectivity products and services.

In 2005, ADC acquired Fiber Optic Network Solutions (FONS) to expand its FTTX offerings and OpenCell to enhance its wireless coverage and capacity offerings.

G-Connect was acquired by ADC Technologies in 2006 for an undisclosed amount.

In 2007 ADC acquired LGC Wireless.

In 2008, ADC expanded its market presence and manufacturing capacity in China by acquiring Century Man Communications.
