= Tom Mayson (Canadian football) =

Profile
- Position: Halfback

Personal information
- Born: February 1, 1928; Edmonton, Alberta
- Died: October 18, 2010 (aged 82); Edmonton, Alberta
- Listed height: 5 ft 10 in (1.78 m)
- Listed weight: 180 lb (82 kg)

Career information
- University: Alberta

Career history
- 1949: Edmonton Eskimos

Tom Mayson (February 1, 1928 – October 18, 2010) was a Canadian professional football player who played for the Edmonton Eskimos. He previously played for the Alberta Golden Bears. Mayson's grandson, Joffrey Lupul, who is an NHL player, played for the Edmonton Oilers while Mayson was a former member of the Edmonton Investors Group (EIG), the limited partnership that owned the Edmonton Oilers.
