= Cal Nichols =

Canadian businessman (1942–2026)

Cal Nichols CM
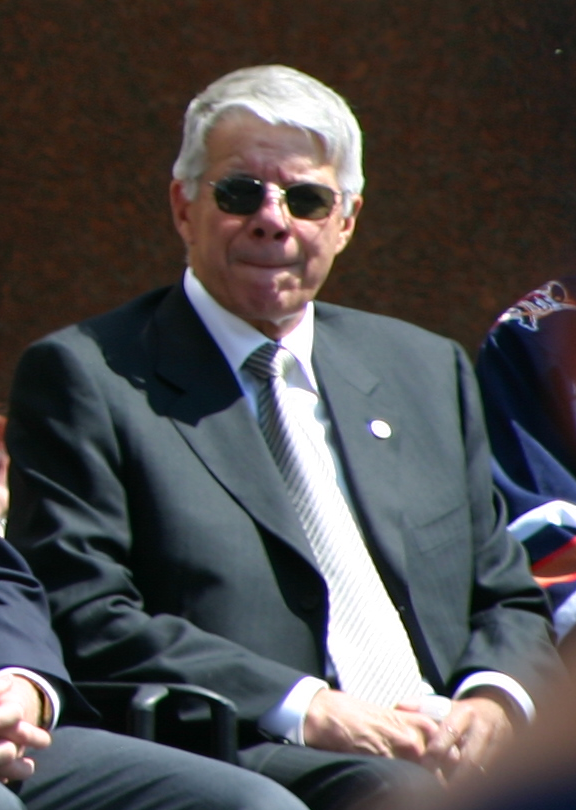
- Nichols in 2006
- Born: April 25, 1942; Paradise Hill, Saskatchewan, Canada
- Died: September 12, 2026 (aged 84)
- Occupation: Businessman
- Known for: Founder of Gasland Properties Ltd. Chairman of Edmonton Investors Group; Chairman of Alberta Enterprise Group

Calvin Manford Nichols (April 25, 1942 – September 12, 2026) was a Canadian businessman who spearheaded the group which would later become the Edmonton Investors Group (EIG) which owned the National Hockey League's Edmonton Oilers.

== Life and career ==
Born in Paradise Hill, Saskatchewan on April 25, 1942, Nichols started his business career in 1962 as a 19-year-old when his father cosigned papers for him to take over a rundown St Walburg, Saskatchewan Esso station. He worked hard to win the local farmers' custom, became involved in the local community playing sports, and was elected Councillor at 23. He married Edna, a St Walburg girl and after 7 years in 1969, they moved to Edmonton.

Over the next 13 years, he pursued various business and career opportunities. He was the commission bulk agent for Esso in Edmonton from 1972 through 1981 and served as Chairman of the Esso Agents Prairie Region Advisory Board. During his tenure, this became the largest Esso Agency in Canada. In 1983, anticipating the de-regulation of the crude oil and natural gas markets, Nichols and two associates founded Northridge Canada Inc. which became Canada's largest privately held crude oil and natural gas trading company. Northridge was ultimately sold to TransCanada Pipelines. In 1985, he created Gasland Oil, with its head office in Edmonton. Gasland grew to have over 50 branded petroleum outlets in Western Canada, many with convenience stores and other customer facilities. He sold substantially all of Gasland's petroleum marketing business in 1996 to Husky Energy but retained Gasland Properties Ltd., he has therefore shifted his focus to developing that company's various holdings. As of 2021 it owned 16 retail properties in Alberta, including gas stations, liquor stores, and cannabis shops.

In May 2002, he was inducted into the Alberta Business Hall of Fame. He was awarded the Queen Elizabeth II Golden Jubilee Medal, created in 2002 and awarded to persons who had made outstanding contributions to both their community and to Canada.

In the 2015 Canadian honours, he was appointed a Member of the Order of Canada (CM) "for his contributions to the business and civic sectors in Edmonton, notably as a supporter of a wide variety of community causes."

Nichols summed up his own life view as reciprocity:

"I believe in being rewarded for superior effort, harder work, ... you should benefit from that, but in the process of benefiting, you should never forget where you came from, and how can I use my good fortune to help those who are less fortunate. I think it’s about living life in balance."

Nichols died on September 12, 2026, at the age of 84.

== Edmonton Investors Group (EIG) ==
Nichols had played hockey and was a season-ticket holder of the Oilers hockey team in Edmonton. The Oilers were owned by Peter Pocklington, whose decisions regarding the team had disillusioned fans including a threat to move the team to the United States. In 1994, in return for taxpayer funds being used to refurbish the home ground, Pocklington had agreed that local buyers would be given the right to purchase the team for cnd$100 before he could sell it to an American buyer. The Oilers were in financial difficulties but could receive league assistance if they could sell 13,000 season tickets and 90 percent of corporate boxes. In 1996, Nichols co-chaired the Friends of the Oilers (FOTO) ticket drive campaign, and mainly through his efforts the 13,000 season tickets deadline was reached. In 1997, when the franchise was put up for sale, he spearheaded the bid from a local ownership group EIG made up of 37/38 investors by co-ordinating raising the $60 million in equity required to purchase the team. His motivation for this was to see the team keep Edmonton as a "Major League City." He started his tenure as chairman of the EIG board in March 2000.

The Oilers became financially successful with Forbes valuing the club at US$146 million. The success of the Oilers brought a US$145 million offer from local billionaire Daryl Katz for the franchise, although Nichols subsequently said the team was not for sale. Katz upped the offer to US$150 million, but was turned down again.

On August 7, Katz made a third offer for the team of US$170 million. Nichols said the attempts to buy the team have caused "collateral damage" and he hoped the outright refusal brings closure to a vocal debate that has divided the group and the wider community since Katz's first offer. Nichols was quoted as saying "This is not about dollars. This is about Edmonton. An ownership group is best-suited for Edmonton and the Oilers."

On December 13, 2007, Katz submitted a fourth formal offer to EIG to buy the franchise. The offer was $188 million to the EIG shareholders, plus another $100 million towards the building of a new arena in downtown Edmonton. The offer was accepted and Nichols resigned as chairman of the board of directors for the EIG in December 2007. and the 34 members of the EIG were paid out . Katz acknowledged the role of Nichols in the Oilers success, "If it wasn’t for Cal, the Oilers wouldn’t be in Edmonton."

== Alberta Enterprise Group ==
In 2007 Nichols banded together with a group of businessmen to form the Alberta Enterprise Group. Their purpose was to connect business leaders with Alberta policymakers and the public for the benefit of all stakeholders. Nichols was chairman and in November 2011 a new chairman and Board were elected and he became Chairman Emeritus, an honorary title. He was thanked for "... his vision and leadership in helping to create this organization."

Sporting positions
Preceded by Peter Pocklington	Edmonton Oilers owner 1998–2008	Succeeded by Daryl Katz
