= Golder =

Golder is a surname. Notable people with the surname include:

- Alan Golder (born 1955), American burglar
- Benjamin M. Golder (1891–1946), American politician
- Douglas Golder (born 1948), Australian field hockey player
- Frank A. Golder (1877–1929), American historian, scholar and writer
- Gabriela Golder (born 1971), Argentine artist and curator
- Jamie Golder (born 1962), American tennis player
- Jimmy Golder (1955–2000), English professional footballer
- Matt Golder, political scientist
- Scott Golder (born 1976), New Zealand cricketer
- Stanley Golder (1929–2000), American financier
- Sue Golder (born 1946), New Zealand athlete and track cyclist
- Tom Golder (born 1944), Australian field hockey player

== See also ==
- David Golder, novel by Irène Némirovsky
- David Golder (film), French film of the novel of the same name by Irène Némirovsky
- Golder Associates, a global consulting firm
- Golder Cottage, early New Zealand colonial cottage built by John Golder
