= Premier League parachute and solidarity payments =

Payments made to English Football League clubs

The Premier League distributes a formulaically derived financial payment to each English Football League (EFL) club every season. There are two mechanisms with which funds are calculated and distributed; these are known as "Parachute Payments" and "Solidarity Payments". The payments are linked to the value of the Premier League’s broadcasting rights. In the 2017–18 season the Premier League paid £243m in Parachute Payments split amongst 8 clubs, and £100m in Solidarity Payments split amongst the remaining 64 clubs. This compares to £88m of UK TV revenue the EFL distributed to its 72 clubs for the 2017–18 season.

== History ==
Before the Foundation of the Premier League in 1992, monetary distribution of television revenue was split between the top four divisions, with half paid to First Division clubs (equivalent to the Premier League); 25 percent to Second Division clubs (equivalent to the EFL Championship), and 12.5 percent paid to each of the bottom two divisions (equivalent to EFL League One and EFL League Two). Until the 2006-07 season the Premier League did not share any of their broadcasting revenue with the English Football League other than £4m a year for youth development, and participating in the EFL Cup which added value to the English Football League television deal.

In the 2006-07 season "parachute" payments were introduced which meant for two seasons following relegation a club would receive half of the per club Premier League basic TV money, this would lower the risk of a club going into administration due to the high cost base (mainly player wages) they incurred in the Premier League. In addition "solidarity" payments from the Premier League worth £1m were paid to each EFL Championship club to help mitigate concerns about the impact the parachute payments might have to the competitive balance of the league. The structure and value of the "parachute" and "solidarity" payments have continually evolved since then.

== Premier League broadcasting rights ==
The Premier League splits the UK broadcasting income into 3 categories. 50 per cent equally shared between Premier League clubs; 25 per cent shared based on how often a club's matches are broadcast in the UK (known as "Facility Fees"); and 25 per cent shared based on where a club finish in the league table (known as "Merit Payments").

Overseas broadcasting income is currently split equally between Premier League clubs.

Payments to EFL clubs are linked only to the equally shared element of the broadcasting income (i.e. 50% of UK income, and 100% of Overseas income).

== Parachute payments ==
Parachute payments are unique to the English game and currently see clubs relegated from the Premier League receive a percentage of the equally shared element of broadcasting rights each Premier League club receives. This percentage drops progressively over a three-year period – 55% in the first year, 45% in year two and, if the club was in the Premier League for more than one season before relegation, 20% in the third year. This system was introduced for clubs relegated in 2015/16 onwards, with the previous system having a similar structure but with payments spread over 4 years. If a club is promoted back to the Premier League during the parachute payment period, then no more parachute payments will be made. Therefore, all three teams relegated in a given year will receive a 55% share of 1 equal share in the first year of relegation (i.e. the Championship). However, if any of these three teams are promoted after one year in the Championship (back to the Premier League), then such team(s) will not receive 45% of one share in parachute payments for the 2nd year (because the team(s) will earn a one share as one of the 20 teams of the EPL)

Club	Season Relegated	2015–16 (million)	2016–17 (million)	2017–18 (million)	2018–19 (million)	2019–20 (est.) (million)	2020–21 (est.) (million)	2021–22 (est.) (million)	2022–23 (est.) (million)
Bolton Wanderers	2011–12	£10.5m							
Blackburn Rovers	2011–12	£10.5m							
Wolverhampton Wanderers	2011–12	£10.5m							
Reading	2012–13	£10.5m	£16.3m						
Wigan Athletic	2012–13	£10.5m	£16.3m						
Cardiff City	2013–14 & 2018–19	£20.8m	£16.3m	£16.6m		£41.3m	£35.5m		
Fulham	2013–14, 2018–19, 2020–21	£20.8m	£16.3m	£16.6m		£41.3m		£44.4m	
Queens Park Rangers	2014–15	£25.9m	£31.1m	£16.6m	£17.0m				
Burnley	2014–15 & 2021–22	£25.9m	Promoted (£0)						£44.4m
Hull City	2014–15 & 2016–17	£25.9m	Promoted (£0)	£41.6m	£34.9m				
Newcastle United	2015–16		£40.9m	Promoted (£0)					
Aston Villa	2015–16		£40.9m	£34.0m	£15.9m				
Norwich City	2015–16, 2019–20, 2021–22		£40.9m	£34.0m	£43.1m		£43.4m		£44.4m
Sunderland	2016–17			£41.6m	£34.9m	£15.0m			
Middlesbrough	2016–17			£41.6m	£34.9m				
Swansea City	2017–18				£42.6m	£33.8m	£15.8m		
Stoke City	2017–18				£42.6m	£33.8m	£15.8m		
West Bromwich Albion	2017–18 & 2020–21				£42.6m	£33.8		£44.4m	£36.3m
Huddersfield Town	2018–19					£41.3m	£35.5m	£16.1m	
Bournemouth	2019–20						£43.4m	£36.3m	
Watford	2019–20 & 2021–22						£43.4m		£44.4m
Sheffield United	2020–21							£44.4m	£36.3m)
Total		£171.8m	£219.0m	£242.6m	£265.2m	£240.0m	£232.0m	£185.6m	£177.0m

The EFL also operates a Parachute Payment system within the EFL Leagues and the National League. From the 2016–17 season onwards payments are:

- Clubs relegated from the EFL Championship receive 11.1% of the Basic Award payment to Championship clubs for one season.
- Clubs relegated from EFL League One receive 12.6% of the Basic Award payment to League One clubs for one season.
- Clubs relegated from EFL League Two receive 100% of the equivalent Basic Award payment made to League Two clubs in the first year following relegation, and 50% of the equivalent Basic Award payment made to League Two clubs in the second year following relegation.

== Solidarity payments ==
Clubs within the EFL who are not eligible for Parachute Payments receive Solidarity Payments. These are calculated as a percentage of the third year Parachute Payment amount a club relegated from the Premier League would receive (currently 20% of the equally shared element of Premier League broadcasting rights). This percentage drops progressively for each EFL league – 30% in the EFL Championship, 4.5% in EFL League One, and 3% in EFL League Two.

League	2018–19 Per Club (million)	2018–19 League Total (million)
EFL Championship	£4.65m	£79.1m
EFL League One	£0.70m	£16.1m
EFL League Two	£0.47m	£11.2m
Total		£106.3m

== Changes to distribution of overseas TV rights ==
From 2019 to 2020, the current level of revenue from international TV rights sales will still be shared equally between all 20 Premier League clubs. Any increase on that level, will then be distributed according to where a team finish in the league. As the Parachute and Solidarity Payments are linked only to the equally shared element of TV rights, any increase of international TV rights is likely to have little benefit to EFL clubs.

== Debate and criticism ==
There are several concerns often raised around the structure and amount of the payments. These generally relate to the perceived level of fairness, and the impact on the competitive balance of the second tier (EFL Championship). Concerns often raised include:

- Parachute payments give an unfair advantage to relegated clubs and damage the competitive balance of the EFL Championship.
- Solidarity Payments are not anywhere near as high, in percentage terms, as the pre Premier League distribution method. Some believe that the Premier League has a greater responsibility to support the leagues below.
- Some Premier League club owners question the merit of the Premier League "subsidising" the EFL, with John W. Henry quoted as saying “it’s much more difficult to ask independent clubs to subsidise their competitors beyond a certain point".
- Parachute Payments reduce the need for Premier League clubs, either collectively or individually, to insert relegation clauses into player contracts that would lead to an automatic salary decrease in the event of relegation. Relegation clauses might mean players fight harder to avoid relegation, but might also make it more difficult for clubs at risk from relegation to sign players.
