= Edmonton Investors Group =

Canadian sports management company

The Edmonton Investors Group Limited Partnership (EIGLP) was the limited partnership that owned the Edmonton Oilers of the National Hockey League and the Edmonton Oil Kings of the Western Hockey League. With more than thirty individual shareholders, EIGLP was the largest ownership group in the NHL. Among the four North American major sports leagues, only the Green Bay Packers have a larger ownership group.

The EIG were the key players for keeping the Edmonton Oilers in Edmonton, Alberta, Canada long term by purchasing the team from then-owner Peter Pocklington for C$107 million ($192 million in 2025 Canadian dollars) and preventing the team from being moved by being purchased for US$90 million ($178 million in 2025 American dollars) or C$127 million ($228 million in 2025 Canadian dollars).

== History ==
=== Pre-Edmonton Investors Group ===
In the mid-1990s, Edmonton Oilers owner Peter Pocklington was in a precarious financial situation. Pocklington's main creditor, the Alberta Treasury Branches, were demanding repayment of millions of dollars' worth of loans that ATB had made to Pocklington in the 1980s and early 1990s. The once-popular Pocklington had a strained relationship with Edmontonians due in part to his decision to trade Wayne Gretzky as well as his other business and political dealings. As a result, attendance at Northlands Coliseum had declined – partly due to the team's declining on-ice fortunes but also due to personal animosity towards the owner.

This animosity hindered a 1996 season ticket drive that was needed to keep the team in Edmonton. It was largely due to the perseverance of future EIG partner Cal Nichols, that the Friends of the Oilers ticket drive ultimately expanded the season ticket base from a dismal 6,200 to over 13,400, enough to secure the team's future for the short term. However, it was increasingly obvious that Pocklington would not be around for the long term. In early 1997, Pocklington announced his intention to sell up to 45% of the team on the stock market. Pressure from ATB forced him to abandon this plan and put the team up for sale.

When the Oilers were put up for sale, many doubted whether a local ownership could be found and believed the proud franchise would be re-located to an American city as had happened with the teams in Quebec City in 1995 and Winnipeg in 1996. In 1997, the population of the Edmonton metropolitan area was still under one million, a figure viewed by many fans to be the minimum base a North American major sports team needs to be financially viable. With the only other former World Hockey Association team in Hartford re-locating in 1997, many analysts predicted that the "domino effect" would be completed in 1998 with the Oilers' move.

However, the terms of Pocklington's lease at what was then known as the Edmonton Coliseum prevented him from unilaterally moving the team or selling it to someone who intended to move it. It stipulated that an ownership group willing to keep the team in Edmonton would have six weeks from the time any such intention was declared to purchase the team for US$70 million. In addition, the ATB is a crown corporation owned by the Alberta government, though they treated the matter as non-political. While Alberta Premier Ralph Klein wanted to keep the Oilers in the capital, he was wary of a series of scandals involving favouritism at the ATB that had plagued his predecessor, Don Getty, in the 1980s. Klein was unwilling to make any move that might have been perceived by voters as government subsidization of a hockey club that paid multimillion-dollar salaries. However, when Klein's hometown Calgary Flames encountered financial difficulties in 2000, he immediately moved to assist them by creating a province-wide lottery.

=== Cal Nichols looks for investors ===
Nichols, a prominent businessman in his own right, immediately began putting together an ownership group. At the time, the Albertan economy—driven by the oilpatch—was still recovering from price crashes in the 1980s and 1990s. Most Albertan investors preferred to commit their money to the re-emerging oilpatch, not a "small-market" hockey team. With no single Albertan magnate willing to commit C$100 million to purchase the team, Nichols instead decided to secure smaller investments from a larger number of investors to make up the aggregate total. Lenders were willing to finance 40% of the purchase price, meaning Nichols needed to come up with about C$60 million. Nichols had about C$35 million in investments when an offer of US$85 million (C$120 million) came from a buyer who wanted to move the team to Houston.

The Oilers' sale attracted interest in several American cities, and as Nichols was assembling a group of local investors, an offer of US$85 million (C$120 million) came from Leslie Alexander, a Houston-based businessman and an owner of the National Basketball Association's Houston Rockets. Houston, whose application for an expansion team rejected by the league, was (and still is) the largest U.S. city without an NHL franchise. Alexander's original offer was to keep the team in Edmonton on the condition that the lease be terminated, attendance remained at acceptable levels, a local ownership group was eventually found and an expansion team be granted to Alexander in Houston. The Edmonton City Council rejected these terms, believing they gave Alexander too much discretion to move the Oilers to Texas. The city believed the lease they negotiated with Pocklington was still the best chance they had of keeping the team in Edmonton in the long term. Alexander then offered the ATB (which had the team in receivership by then) US$85 million (C$120 million) to purchase the team and move it to Houston, and submitted a US$5 million (C$7 million) deposit. Nichols was given until March 13, 1998 to match the deposit and commit to purchasing the team for US$70 million (C$100 million), or the lease would be automatically terminated and the team would move.

Nichols was eventually able to assemble a group of 38 local investors. As the deadline neared, the Edmonton Investors Group (EIG) decided to commit to the purchase by matching Alexander's deposit with a down payment of US$5 million (C$7 million). The remainder of the US$70 million (C$100 million) was paid to ATB 40 days later. On May 5, 1998, the NHL approved the sale and the EIG officially become the NHL owners. Although major sporting leagues generally frown upon large ownership groups controlling franchises, the NHL decided to forego putting a team in Houston and allow the Oilers' sale to EIG to proceed as they did not want to lose any more Canadian teams – this would have put their lucrative Canadian television contracts in jeopardy.

The Edmonton Investors Group Ltd. is mainly a local ownership group, but includes a few business people from outside the city as well. The Oilers sale even drew interest from Calgary-born comic book creator Todd McFarlane, creator of the famous Spawn character. McFarlane and artist Brent Ashe later designed the Oilers’ third jersey.

In the 2005–06 NHL season, the Oilers sold out every home game except one, where a computer glitch prevented the release of several hundred tickets.

Following a successful 2005–06 season which saw the Oilers fall one win short of winning the Stanley Cup and a boom in the Albertan economy, fan support reached its highest levels. A waiting list for season ticket buyers, unheard of during the days of Pocklington's ownership, was put in place after the owners were compelled to cap the number of season tickets sold. The team has also announced that a lottery will be held for the right to purchase multi-game packages at Rexall Place.

== Daryl Katz purchase offers and sale ==
In the 2006–07 NHL season the Oilers sold out every home game for the first time, despite missing the playoffs by a substantial margin. The ownership group then reportedly received a C$145 million ($214 million in 2025 dollars) offer from local billionaire Daryl Katz for the franchise, although Nichols subsequently said the team was not for sale. Daryl Katz upped the offer to C$150 million ($221 million in 2025 dollars), but was turned down again.

On August 7, Daryl Katz made a third offer for the team of C$185 million ($272 million in 2025 dollars). Cal Nichols, spokesman for the EIG, said it amounted to a hostile takeover, and had caused divisions within the EIG.

On December 13, 2007 Daryl Katz submitted a fourth formal offer to the EIG to buy the franchise. The offer was C$188 million ($277 million in 2025 dollars) to the EIG shareholders, plus another $100 million towards the building of a new arena in downtown Edmonton, as well as a new state of the art training facility located at the University of Alberta. Cal Nichols indicated that he would accept the offer for his share of the team, but that the EIG had to have the owners of 2/3 of the shares agree to the proposal. Cal Nichols resigned as chairman of the board of directors for the EIG on December 14, 2007. Assuming the position of chairman of the board was Bill Butler, a minority shareholder & real estate developer. The EIG met to decide on the bid January 21, 2008.

Before the January 21st meeting there were rumours of a rival or plan B offer led by Gary Gregg, Bill Butler, Brian Nilsson and Jakob Ambrosius. These rumours were confirmed on January 23, as the rival faction would match the Katz offer either by soliciting new shareholders or taking a loan from Scotiabank using the hockey club as collateral.

As reported on The Team 1260 on January 24, 2008 as well as in the Edmonton Journal on January 25, 3 more directors of the Edmonton Investors Group stepped down. Ron Hodgson, Neal Allen & Brian Hryniuk have resigned adding speculation that they may have accepted the Katz offer as well. The updated price per share is C$20,687 ($29,770 in 2025 dollars) and sources close to Daryl Katz said he may be willing to close the deal only having 60% of the 7,492.5 EIG shares.

On June 18, 2008 it was reported that the sale of the Edmonton Oilers was approved to Daryl Katz for a reported C$200 million ($288 million in 2025 dollars).

== Shareholders ==
The ownership of the EIG was as follows (investors on the board of directors in BOLD):

Shareholder	Residence	Percentage Held	Payment (million)
**Dave Addie**	Lloydminster	1.735%	$2.9
**Neal Allen**	Nisku	1.735%	$2.9
**Jakob Ambrosius**	Edmonton	6.673%	$11.1
Manuel Balsa	Edmonton	1.735%	$2.9
Ted Barrett*	Los Angeles	1.335%	$2.2
Edwin E. Bean (1927–2023)	Edmonton	8.742%	$14.5
Gordon Buchanan (1929–2014)	Edmonton	3.470%	$5.8
**Bill Butler**	Edmonton	0.868%	$1.4
Michael Dalton	Kelowna	1.335%	$2.2
The Edmonton Journal	Edmonton	1.335%	$2.2
Ernie Elko	Edmonton	2.002%	$3.3
**Gary Gregg**	Edmonton	9.142%	$15.2
Don Hamilton (1924–2011)	Edmonton	1.735%	$2.9
**Ron Hodgson** and Tom Mayson (1928–2010)	Edmonton	1.735%	$2.9
Jim Hole (1927–2018)	Edmonton	9.142%	$15.2
**Brian Hryniuk**	Edmonton	1.735%	$2.9
The Estate of Gerald Knoll (1932–2008)	Nisku	1.735%	$2.9
**Chris Kuchar****	Edmonton/Nisku	1.735%	$2.9
Larry M. Makelki (1946–2025)	Lloydminster	6.673%	$11.1
Todd McFarlane	Phoenix	1.335%	$2.2
Tim Melton	Edmonton	0.667%	$1.1
Art Mihalcheon (1931–2014)	Edmonton	5.272%	$8.7
**Cal Nichols**	Edmonton	8.008%	$13.3
Lloydminster Consortium of Five: Marcel and Roger Roberge (1957–2013), **Brian Nilsson**, Rusty Stalwick, Keith Weaver	4 (Lloydminster); Rusty Stalwick (Vermilion)	3.570%	$5.9
Al Owen	Edmonton
J. R. "Dick" Paine (1941–2007) and Associates	Edmonton
Harold and Cathy Roozen	Edmonton	1.335%	$2.2
Bruce Saville (1944–2025)	Edmonton	9.142%	$15.2
Dale Sheard	Edmonton	3.470%	$5.8
Simon Sochatsky	Edmonton	1.335%	$2.2
Barry Weaver (1944–2010)***	Edmonton
Jim Woods	Edmonton	0.667%	$1.1
Jim Zanello	Edmonton	0.601%	$1.0

*Purchased shares of Dick Colf in 2002
**Inherited shares of Wally Kuchar (1925-2004) in 2004
***Sold shares to EIG in 2003

== See also ==
- Maple Leaf Sports & Entertainment
- Canucks Sports and Entertainment
