= Jimmy Golder =

English footballer (1955–2000)

Personal information
- Full name: James Golder
- Date of birth: 28 March 1955
- Place of birth: Manchester, England
- Date of death: 12 March 2000 (aged 44)
- Position: Midfielder

Youth career
- Stockport County

Senior career*
Years	Team	Apps	(Gls)
	Stockport County	1	(0)
- Stalybridge Celtic
1977–1984	Hyde United	145	(44)
- Witton Albion
1984–19??	Mossley		
- * Club domestic league appearances and goals

James Golder (28 March 1955 – 12 March 2000) was an English professional association footballer who played as a midfielder. He played in the Football League for Stockport County.

Golder was an apprentice with Stockport County. He played just one league game for Stockport, away to Bury in April 1972, while still aged just under 17 years old. On leaving Stockport, he played for Stalybridge Celtic, Hyde United and Witton Albion from where he joined Mossley in September 1984. He played over 100 times for Mossley. He was later assistant manager of Radcliffe Borough.

Golder died at age 44. In August 2001 a benefit match was held at Woodley Sports including a combined Radcliffe Borough/Hyde United side.
