= Bruce Saville (businessman) =

Canadian businessman and philanthropist (1944–2025)

- Born: December 5, 1944; Toronto, Ontario, Canada
- Died: October 13, 2025 (aged 80); Edmonton, Alberta, Canada
- Occupation: Businessman
- Known for: Founder and chairman emeritus of Saville Systems PLC, shareholder of the Edmonton Oilers
- Spouse: Cathy King

Bruce Saville (December 5, 1944 – October 13, 2025) was a Canadian businessman and philanthropist who lived in Edmonton, Alberta. He was a shareholder of the Edmonton Oilers before the Edmonton Investors Group was sold.

== Career ==
=== Early career ===
Saville started working in the Sales and Service division of Goodyear in Ontario. He was required to create 10-page summary reports using a manual calculator and data from a 4-foot thick computer printout generated monthly. Saville sought to computerize this process. He brought the idea of computerization to Goodyear's IT department; they replied they were too busy.

At Saville's next hockey game, he approached a hockey team member who was a systems analyst. At the following hockey game, his teammate came with five volumes of Cobol programming manuals.

Saville read the manuals, then developed a system which he took to the Goodyear IT department, which ran it and worked. This was Saville's first entry into the computer industry. He then proceeded to work as a systems analyst at Goodyear and then Canada Systems Group. In 1974, Saville was hired at Northern Telephone as Manager of Computer Programming.

=== Saville Systems ===
In Edmonton in 1981, he established Saville Systems, which provided billing solutions to telecommunication companies. The company grew with the industry and customers included AT&T, Sprint, Unitel, Deutsche Telekom, and Nippon Telecom. The company eventually attained 1,700 employees.

In October 1999, the company was bought by ADC Telecommunications. ADC was eventually bought by Intec Telecom Systems of Great Britain.

== After Saville Systems ==
With the money from the sale, Saville established the Saville Interest Group. He was president.

From 1998 to 2008 he was one of three senior investors in the Edmonton Oilers. During this time he also billeted Czech Oilers player Ales Hemsky.

On April 5, 2010, it was announced that Saville would join the board of Serenic Corporation.

=== Philanthropy ===
Before selling Saville Systems, Saville decided to hire a president to reduce his workload. At around the same time, Saville received a questionnaire in the mail from the Inner City Agencies Foundation. He was then invited to his first meeting where he was then appointed board chair.

He was also a board member of Stollery Children's Hospital, Noujaim Institute, Brentwood College since 2003, and a previous board member of NAIT, and Governor of the University of Alberta. It was during this time that Saville also made multiple donations to the university which helped fund the Saville Community Sports Centre.

He was also Chairman of the Edmonton Oilers Community Foundation.

== Personal life and death ==
Saville was born on December 5, 1944. He was an avid ice hockey fan and player all his life. As a player, he was a goaltender. Bruce grew up in Mississauga and attended Gordon Graydon Memorial Highschool.

Saville lived in Edmonton in a house valued at more than $7 million. He died from a heart attack while recovering from back surgery at a hospital in Edmonton on October 13, 2025, at the age of 80.
