= Peter Pocklington =

Canadian entrepreneur (born 1941)

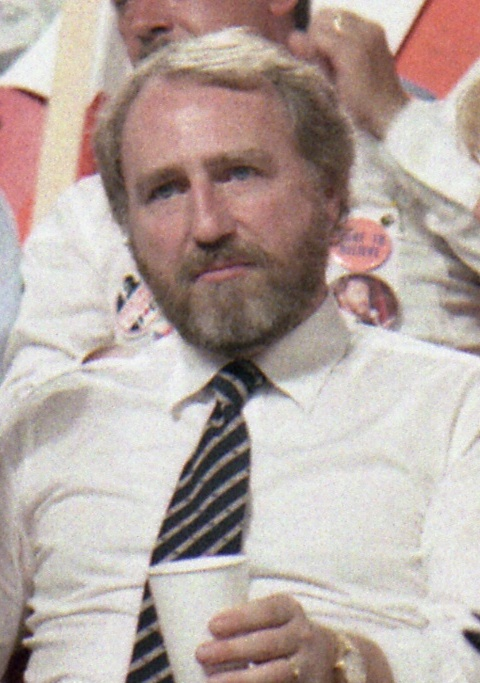
- Pocklington in 1983
- Born: November 18, 1941 (age 85); Regina, Saskatchewan, Canada
- Occupation: Entrepreneur
- Known for: Owner of the Edmonton Oilers from 1976 to 1998
- Spouse: Eva

Peter Hugh Pocklington (born November 18, 1941) is a Canadian entrepreneur.

Peter Pocklington was known among North American hockey fans as "Peter Puck", an entrepreneur from oil-rich Alberta who was also the owner of the National Hockey League (NHL)'s Edmonton Oilers from 1976 to 1998, running the team during its dynasty years from 1983 to 1990. He earned the enmity of many Canadians when he traded Wayne Gretzky, to the Los Angeles Kings.

A vocal advocate of free-market capitalism, Pocklington had various business interests throughout his career. Outside sports, his best-known venture was his tenure as owner of a meatpacking plant in Edmonton, where he became embroiled in a bitter labour dispute in 1986.

Pocklington's life experiences were extensively documented in the 2009 biography, I'd Trade Him Again: On Gretzky, Politics and the Pursuit of the Perfect Deal, written by Terry McConnell and J'lyn Nye. The book's title was inspired by Pocklington's ongoing conviction the Gretzky trade was the right deal at the right time and had a positive impact on all parties concerned: the Oilers, the Kings, Gretzky, and the game itself.

== Early life and career ==
Pocklington was born in Regina, Saskatchewan, to Basil Cohen Pocklington, an insurance executive who had immigrated from England as a young man, and his wife, Eileen (Dempsey), and grew up in London, Ontario.

The greatest influence on young Pocklington was the legendary motivational speaker Earl Nightingale and his best-selling recording, The Strangest Secret. "It literally stated, 'You become what you think about,' " Pocklington told his biographers. He says he still has the record today.

One of his earliest business ventures was to find old cars on the farms around his maternal grandparents' home in Carberry, Manitoba, buy them for $25, then ship them to Ontario by train, where he sold them for upwards of $500. Because of the West's dry, cold climate, the cars, many of them 25 to 40 years old, were in better shape than comparable vehicles that had been driven on Ontario's salted roads.

By the time Pocklington was 25, he owned his first car dealership, Westown Ford in Tilbury, Ontario. At the time, he was the youngest Ford dealer in Canada. Within a few years, he had sold the Tilbury dealership and bought another nearby Chatham. By 1971, when Pocklington was only 29, he left Ontario and moved west, where he bought Shirley Ford in Edmonton, Alberta. Within a few years, Pocklington was running the most successful Ford dealership in Canada. He also had the cash flow to buy Edmonton's fledgling team in the World Hockey Association (WHA), the Edmonton Oilers.

=== Sports owner ===
Pocklington would come to operate several businesses over the next several years, but he has always said owning sports teams gave him the most satisfaction.

The man who came to be known as "Peter Puck" bought part ownership of the Edmonton Oilers in 1976. According to his biography, he offered a diamond ring his wife was wearing to dinner as his downpayment. Within a year, Pocklington bought out his partner, Nelson Skalbania, who would later own the WHA's Indianapolis Racers.

In December 1978, the Indianapolis Racers, furthered the collapse of the World Hockey Association and ceased operations due to financial difficulties. Gordy Robson, acting as Nelson Skalbania’s representative, delivered the public statement announcing the team's closure following day-long negotiations with the club's limited partners. "The talks were unsuccessful and leaves the general partner (Skalbania) no choice but to fold the team."

It was also from Skalbania that Pocklington acquired perhaps the greatest hockey player ever. In the fall of 1978, Skalbania offered Pocklington the rights to a 17-year-old phenom Wayne Gretzky. The Oilers' owner did not hesitate to do the deal. A few months later, Pocklington parlayed the Gretzky signing into a merger between the WHA and the National Hockey League (NHL); with this, the Oilers became members of the NHL. Five years later, the Oilers would win their first of five Stanley Cup championships they would capture under Pocklington's ownership.

Over the next 18 years, Pocklington also owned the Edmonton Trappers of baseball's Pacific Coast League, the Edmonton Drillers of the North American Soccer League and the National Professional Soccer League, the Edmonton Brick Men of the Canadian Soccer League, and the Kamloops Junior Oilers of the Western Hockey League.

=== Entrepreneur ===
Edmonton in the 1970s was experiencing explosive growth fuelled by an oil boom and several fortunes were made, not only by Pocklington but by the likes of Pat Bowlen, later owner of the National Football League's Denver Broncos. Pocklington’s business empire eventually exceeded $2 billion in sales; massive real estate holdings throughout Alberta and Ontario; Fidelity Trust, one of Canada's largest trust companies; Palm Dairies, one of the largest retailers of dairy products in Western Canada; Canbra Foods, a canola manufacturer; Magic Pantry, which sold prepared foods that did not require refrigeration; Kretschmar Foods, which serviced restaurants; Green Acre Farms, a chicken-processing company with plants in Texas and Mississippi; and Gainers, an Edmonton-based beef- and pork-packing company.

=== Hostage-taking ===
Pocklington was also taken hostage by a gunman who broke into his home. "I thought I was bullet-proof—until I was shot," Pocklington told his biographers. The kidnapper was caught and Pocklington made a full recovery. The plan of the kidnapper, Mirko Petrović, was to kidnap Eva Pocklington, but she escaped. The other two people in the house were released, leaving Pocklington, who was with the gunman for 11 hours while he negotiated a $2 million ransom. However, before the ransom could be paid, RCMP law enforcement snuck into the house and shot both Petrović and Pocklington, wounding both men. They each made a full recovery and Petrović served five years in an Alberta prison before he was released and returned to Yugoslavia.

=== Politics ===
In 1983, Pocklington entered the Progressive Conservative Party of Canada leadership convention. He campaigned on a platform of free trade with the United States, privatizing government-owned Crown corporations like Air Canada, Petro-Canada and Canadian National Railway, retiring the national debt and implementing a flat tax. In the end, Pocklington fell far below his expectations of delegates; one advisor jokingly guessed "99", Gretzky's sweater number, and Pocklington came close to receiving 102 delegates. He withdrew his candidacy before the second ballot and supported the eventual winner Brian Mulroney, who would adopt some of Pocklington's policies while in government.

== Philanthropy ==
Pocklington was an active philanthropist for many years in Edmonton. Among his gifts were $1.5 million he helped raise for the Canadian Cystic Fibrosis Foundation; $1 million for the Jamie Platz YMCA; $300,000 for the Glen Sather Sports Medicine Clinic at the University of Alberta; $250,000 to establish a free-enterprise chair at the University of Alberta's School of Business; and upwards of $2 million for Junior Achievement. It was through his charitable works that he became close friends with famed tenor Luciano Pavarotti, former British prime minister Margaret Thatcher, and former U.S. presidents Gerald Ford and George H. W. Bush. From 1995 to 2010, Pocklington served as a member of the board of directors for the Betty Ford Center.

== Leaving Canada for the United States ==
In 1998, after selling the Oilers, Pocklington moved to the U.S. with his wife Eva, and settled in Palm Desert, California. He remains active in business and philanthropic pursuits there, and was for a long time member of the board of directors at the Betty Ford Center. While Pocklington remains a controversial figure in Canada because of the Wayne Gretzky trade, he has his fans, too. On October 8, 2014, Pocklington was invited back to Edmonton when the Edmonton Oilers organized a 30-year reunion of their first Stanley Cup championship team. When he was introduced, he received a standing ovation from the 17,000 fans in attendance.

== Controversies ==
=== Gainers strike ===
While Pocklington's business empire realized its successes, it suffered its failures, too. Prime interest rates in the early 1980s topped out at 18.5%, a development that sapped the oil boom of its strength, collapsed the real estate market, and sank Fidelity Trust in a sea of declining property values.

Pocklington's labour dispute with the United Food and Commercial Workers (UFCW) union ended up crippling Gainers, which at the time was Canada's second-largest meat packer. During the union's six-month strike, Pocklington used strikebreakers, primarily from Quebec, to keep the plant operating despite the picket lines, a decision that earned him the enmity of Canada's labour movement. Eventually, he agreed to settle the strike and rehire the striking workers at the request of the Alberta government. In return, says Pocklington in his biography, then-Premier of Alberta Don Getty agreed to give Gainers an interest-free loan of $50 million. Gainers would give the province 10% of its operating profit every year for the next four years, and repay a conventional mortgage after that. Pocklington also insisted the province disband its pork marketing board, which fixed prices on pork at a rate higher than what the meat packers could sell it in the marketplace. Instead, the government gave Gainers $55 million at 10.5% interest, refusing to disband the marketing board. "They said, 'Take it or leave it,'" Pocklington told his biographers. Crippled with a debt-servicing cost it did not anticipate and handicapped by inflated production costs created by the marketing board, Gainers immediately began to drown in debt. Loan repayments were missed and within three years, the Alberta government took over Gainers. The province lost $89 million on the venture in the four years it operated Gainers—more than double the rate of loss in Pocklington's last few years at the helm—and eventually sold the company for 1/20 of the price Pocklington paid for it 11 years earlier.

=== Stanley Cup ===
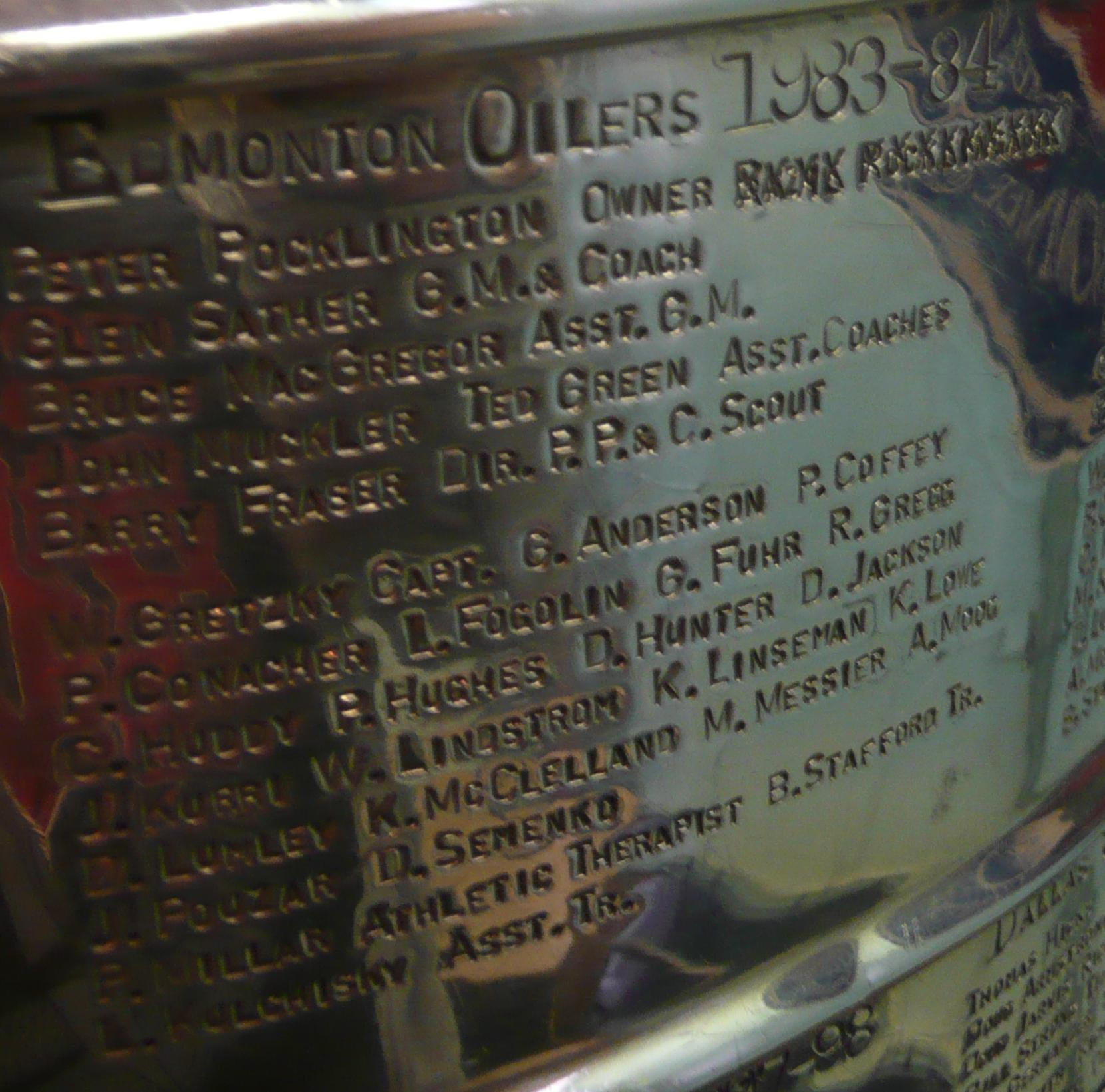
Basil Pocklington's (X-ed out) name on the Stanley Cup

After the Edmonton Oilers won their first Stanley Cup in 1983–84, Peter Pocklington included his father, Basil Pocklington, on the list of people and players who were to have their names engraved on the trophy. The NHL did not check the validity of the names on the list, and the Cup was engraved as usual. NHL executives, via the Hockey Hall of Fame, had the engraver strike out the name of the senior Pocklington by engraving a series of Xs over his name. When Peter Pocklington was confronted with the issue, he protested it was the engraver's fault, not his, that the engraver had mixed up the people who were technical members of the team (Basil was not one of them) with a list of individuals who were to receive miniature replica Cups (Basil was one of them).

After this error, the NHL and Hockey Hall of Fame adopted policies to confirm the roster and the relation of the people on the engraving list to the championship team. Of the two dozen engraving errors that appear on the Stanley Cup all but one are spelling errors. Basil Pocklington was the only name that was covered until November 2021, when the Hall of Fame struck the name of 2009–10 Chicago Blackhawks video coach Brad Aldrich due to sexual assault charges during that season.

=== Gretzky trade ===
On August 9, 1988, Pocklington shocked hockey fans by trading Gretzky to the Los Angeles Kings for Jimmy Carson, Martin Gélinas, $15 million cash, and the Kings' first-round draft picks in 1989, 1991 and 1993. One member of the House of Commons of Canada demanded the government block the trade, another man burned Pocklington in effigy, and Gretzky's bride, actress Janet Jones, was branded hockey's "Yoko Ono".

There is debate as to whether Gretzky "jumped" or was "pushed". A book by former Kings owner Bruce McNall quotes Pocklington as saying Gretzky had become impossible to deal with since he began dating Jones, who let it be known that she was not going to live in Edmonton after they got married. Pocklington claims he has had only nice things to say about the couple, yet he has repeatedly defended the trade as being a sound business decision that he would not hesitate to make again. However, he would later admit the trade to be a difficult and regrettable decision, but a vital transaction to keep the team financially afloat.

=== Losing the Oilers ===
By the late 1980s, increasing player salaries led the Oilers to trade Gretzky and other stars, such as Paul Coffey, Mark Messier, Jari Kurri, Glenn Anderson, Kevin Lowe and Grant Fuhr. By the mid-1990s, the Oilers were still losing money, but Pocklington balked at using his other businesses to bankroll his hockey team. He publicly threatened to move the team to Hamilton and Minneapolis, but never made good on the threats. He would almost sell the team to then Houston Rockets owner Les Alexander, and the team almost moved to Houston until a locally-based investors group bought the team shortly before the conclusion of the 1997–98 season in May 1998, which elected to keep them in Edmonton.

Pocklington operated the team on a line of credit, paying 19% interest to the Alberta Treasury Branches (ATB). He asked the ATB to convert the outstanding amount, about $120 million into a conventional mortgage he could pay down. The ATB refused and instead called his loan. His remaining business empire was sold off piece by piece, including the Oilers and Trappers, and Canbra Foods. Years later, Pocklington told his biographers, "Losing the Oilers was like having my heart torn out."

=== Stanley Cup rings ===
In May 2012, Pocklington announced his family was auctioning memorabilia from his time as owner of the Oilers, including his rings from their Stanley Cup championships. According to the Edmonton Journal, this was the second time the rings were put up for auction. In 2008, an anonymous bidder offered $272,829 for the rings but withdrew his bid amid rumours the rings were not the only set Pocklington had commissioned. Pocklington later claimed in his biography the confusion stemmed from a set of rings he had made for his father, and were sold by his father’s estate in 2001. The rings offered in 2008 and again in 2012 have been certified as authentic, he said.

=== Business setbacks ===
Pocklington invested in several businesses in the U.S., including the nutraceutical maker Naturade, and golf club manufacturers Golf Gear and Sonartec. However, those investments yielded more heartache than profit, and what he claims was fiduciary malfeasance by some partners in these ventures left Pocklington the target of numerous lawsuits. In the summer of 2008, one of those suits resulted in raids by U.S. Marshals of the Pocklington home in Indian Wells, California, where a number of items belonging to his wife, including gowns, shoes and purses, as well as Andy Warhol prints of Mick Jagger, were seized. These were eventually returned.

=== Avoiding prison time ===
Pocklington filed for bankruptcy in 2008. In 2010 he pleaded guilty to making false statements and oaths in his bankruptcy case. He was sentenced to six months of home detention, two years of probation and 100 hours of community service.

While a lower court had retroactively revoked Peter Pocklington's probation on a perjury conviction and sentenced him to six months in prison, the Ninth U.S. Circuit Court of Appeals reversed that ruling on appeal. "The Probation Office was crystal clear about the absence of anything resembling probable cause," wrote Judge Margaret McKeown. The court had earlier heard evidence that Pocklington had, over 19 months, failed to disclose consulting fees paid to a company controlled by his wife. Pocklington argued that was not the case, that all income was reported through tax returns and bank statements. Nevertheless, California District Court Judge Virginia A. Phillips gave Pocklington until December 9, 2013, to report to prison.

At the time, Pocklington released a statement saying, "I accept full responsibility for my actions."

On December 6, 2013, the CBC reported Pocklington would appeal his sentence, had been released on $100,000 bail, and would not be reporting to prison as ordered.

On July 3, 2015, the Toronto Sun reported that the Ninth U.S. Circuit Court of Appeals had reversed the ruling. In vacating Judge Phillips' original order, "The district court lacked jurisdiction to extend Pocklington’s probation beyond its October 26, 2012, expiration date," the appeal court panel said in a written judgment.

=== Conjecture ===
In April 2012, investigators with the Arizona Corporation Commission alleged Pocklington and an associate, John McNeil, had engaged in securities fraud related to Crystal Pistol Resources LLC and Liberty Bell Resources 1, LLC. Pocklington vigorously denied the allegations, insisted he and McNeil had done nothing wrong, and that investors in the mining venture were not being misled. The geologists associated with the project were, according to the mining company newsletter, also vigorously defending their data. Those geologists "boast impeccable reputations and have been conscientious and thorough in their testing", Pocklington wrote in a letter to the Edmonton Journal. "We do not tell our investors anything their data is not telling us."

On June 4, 2013, a decision rendered by the Arizona Corporations Commission ordered the respondents to pay the commission of $5,149,316 and an administrative penalty of $100,000. The Commission would disburse the funds on a pro-rata basis to investors. A statement by Pocklington's company was included in Canadian media accounts, which stated “the allegations of wrongdoing ... have been laid to rest” with the commission’s decision. "We have done nothing wrong," Pocklington said in the release. "We have worked diligently and honestly with all of our investors and have been conscientious in guiding the company through the necessary regulatory frameworks. We are committed to raising capital in accordance with existing rules and regulations." He added that any errors were "born of inexperience and naivete, not malice or avarice", and were quickly rectified.

On December 6, 2013, a report by the CBC stated that the $5,149,316 fine remains unpaid.

=== Edmonton Oilers' 1984 reunion ===
On October 8, 2014, Pocklington was the focus of a media opportunity organized by the Edmonton Oilers Hockey Club to promote the 30-year reunion of the 1984 Stanley Cup championship team. When asked if he was concerned about the reception he would get from Edmontonians, he replied, "I really don't give a damn what some of the unwashed have to say." His comment resulted in a social media storm that continued until his appearance at the October 10 Edmonton Oilers 1985 Stanley Cup Reunion at Rexall Place in Edmonton. Media polls indicated he was in for a rough reception at the event. However, he received a standing ovation from fans in attendance. He subsequently sent letters to the editors of The Edmonton Sun. The Sun published the letter of thanks intact on October 14, 2014.

== In film, print and social media ==
Pocklington has appeared as himself in several television series:

- 30 for 30: King's Ransom (2009)
- The top 5 reasons you can't blame... The Edmonton Oilers for trading Wayne Gretzky (2005)
- ESPN SportsCentury: 1988 (2002)
- ESPN SportsCentury: Wayne Gretzky (2000)

Pocklington is also the subject of several books:

- I'd Trade Him Again: On Gretzky, Politics, and the Pursuit of the Perfect Deal by Terry McConnell, J'Lyn Nye, with Peter Pocklington (Fenn Publishing: First hardcover edition, 2009; Second paperback edition, 2010)
- The Puck Talks Here, The amazing life and turbulent times of Peter Pocklington by Terry McConnell, J'Lyn Nye, with Peter Pocklington (Terry McConnell, publisher: Paperback, April 2012; Smashwords eBook, April 2012)
- I'd Trade Him Again: Wayne Gretzky & Peter Pocklington by Terry McConnell, J'Lyn Nye, with Peter Pocklington (Terry McConnell, publisher: Smashwords eBook, 2012)

On February 24, 2012, a Los Angeles-based social media firm hired by Pocklington posted a series of six videos on "The Official YouTube Channel for Peter Pocklington." These videos, shot in the living room of Pocklington's Palm Desert home, were developed as part of a "reputation management" campaign that included accounts on Twitter (@IamPocklington) and Facebook (Peter Hugh Pocklington).

== Health challenges ==
Pocklington has been diagnosed with age-related macular degeneration, or AMD. As a result, he no longer drives and requires others to assist in reading memos or other business correspondence to him. On October 19, 2013, The Edmonton Sun reported Pocklington would seek stem-cell treatment for his condition.
