= 1967 NHL expansion =

1967 addition of teams to the NHL

Map of the Original Six cities in red and the 1967 expansion cities in blue

The 1967 National Hockey League (NHL) expansion added six new franchises for the 1967–68 season, doubling the size of the league to 12 teams. It was the largest expansion undertaken at one time by an established major sports league and the first change in the composition of the NHL since 1942, ending the era of the Original Six.

The six new teams were the Los Angeles Kings, Minnesota North Stars, Oakland Seals, Philadelphia Flyers, Pittsburgh Penguins, and St. Louis Blues. This expansion, including placing two new clubs on the West Coast, was the result of the league's fears of a rival league that would challenge the NHL for players and the Stanley Cup. In addition, the league hoped that the expansion would result in a lucrative TV contract in the United States.

The Seals, later renamed the California Golden Seals and then the Cleveland Barons, are the only team from the expansion to cease operations and not reach the Stanley Cup Final. The North Stars relocated to Dallas, Texas and became the Dallas Stars, while the Blues, Flyers, Kings, and Penguins continue to operate in their home cities. All active teams have won the Stanley Cup at least once, with the Penguins holding the most Cup titles among the 1967 expansion franchises at five.

== Background ==
In the aftermath of the shakeout caused by the Depression and World War II, in which the National Hockey League contracted from ten teams to the so-called "Original Six" clubs (Boston Bruins, Montreal Canadiens, Toronto Maple Leafs, New York Rangers, Detroit Red Wings and Chicago Black Hawks), the NHL became immensely profitable. Professional sports teams of the era were primarily gate-driven enterprises; however, attendances consistently rose after the end of the war. With arenas that generally held around 15,000 spectators in this era selling out with increasing frequency, the league expanded the schedule from the wartime 50 games to 70 games by the 1950s. Meanwhile, owners aggressively kept costs (especially player salaries) as low as possible and ruthlessly suppressed all attempts by the players to unionize, in particular when they perceived a threat by the organizing efforts of Red Wings star Ted Lindsay.

As the NHL stabilized, it came under the control of a few wealthy tycoons, in particular the powerful Norris family. James E. Norris, the owner of the Red Wings, effectively controlled the league's other three American teams as well. After the elder Norris died in 1952, this control was exercised by his son James D. Norris. NHL owners staunchly resisted applications to expand beyond six franchises. Even with expanding attendance, the NHL's Board of Governors resisted expansion in the early 1950s when they turned down a bid from a Cleveland ownership group headed by James Hendy. In 1953 he received conditional approval for a franchise from the league but was ultimately rejected based on financial viability of the group. Another factor the Board of Governors addressed was the decline in attendance at both Chicago and Boston rinks due to the rise of television. This decline was so severe that the NHL had to give assistance to Chicago in the early 1950s.

The NHL had been an early leader in television broadcasting, both in Canada and the U.S. However, the league was left without a U.S. network broadcast partner after CBS dropped out of its deal on July 26, 1960. Furthermore, some owners saw that the televising of other sports had enhanced the images of those leagues' players, and feared that this would provide leverage at salary time.

== Expansion teams ==
Map of cities interested in an NHL expansion team

In 1963, Rangers governor William M. Jennings introduced to his peers the idea of expanding the league to the American West Coast by adding two new teams for the 1964–65 season. His argument was based around concerns that the Western Hockey League intended to operate as a major league in the near future. He also hoped that teams on the west coast would make the league truly national, and improve the chances of returning to television in the United States. While the governors did not agree to the proposal, the topic of expansion arose every time the owners met thereafter.

The expansion process formally began in March 1965, when NHL President Clarence Campbell announced that the league proposed to expand its operations through the formation of a second six-team division. San Francisco – Oakland and Vancouver were declared "acceptable cities" with Los Angeles and St. Louis as approved sites. On February 9, 1966, the NHL Board of Governors considered applications from 13 different ownership groups representing eight cities, including four from Los Angeles, two from Pittsburgh, and one each from Minneapolis–Saint Paul, Philadelphia, San Francisco–Oakland, Baltimore, Buffalo, and Vancouver.

Six franchises were ultimately added: the California Seals (San Francisco–Oakland), Los Angeles Kings, Minnesota North Stars, Philadelphia Flyers, Pittsburgh Penguins, and St. Louis Blues. St. Louis was given 60 days to come up with an ownership group by April 5, 1966, or the franchise would have then been awarded to Baltimore. Four of those teams are still playing in their original cities under their original names. In 1978, the North Stars merged with the Cleveland Barons, who were the relocated Seals, and in 1993 the North Stars became the Dallas Stars. Both the San Francisco–Oakland market and the Minneapolis–St. Paul markets were eventually granted new franchises as the San Jose Sharks and the Minnesota Wild.

=== Opposition ===
Canadian fans, including Prime Minister Lester B. Pearson, were irate that no Canadian teams were added, particularly since Vancouver had been generally considered a lock for a team. Internal considerations played a role in this decision. Montreal and Toronto were not interested in sharing CBC television revenues with another Canadian club. Additionally, Chicago owner Arthur Wirtz’s support was reportedly contingent upon the establishment of a St. Louis team, which would buy the St. Louis Arena from him. However, that city did not submit a bid for a franchise. Toronto also blocked Buffalo's application because the Leafs' representative on the Board of Governors, Stafford Smythe, felt Buffalo was too close to the Toronto market.

The NHL's selection process drew criticism from Maryland politicians in the United States Congress after the league rejected Baltimore's bid. On February 21, 1966, Representative Samuel Friedel, whose district included Baltimore, noted in the United States House of Representatives that Baltimore had applied for a franchise and questioned the circumstances surrounding the selection of the successful markets. On March 8, 1966, Maryland Senator Daniel Brewster raised the issue in the United States Senate, similarly questioning the selection process and specifically pointing out that St. Louis appeared to lack an active ownership group when the franchises were awarded. Brewster also noted that Norris, a former owner of the Chicago Black Hawks, was a co-owner of the St. Louis Arena.

On a more general note, many traditionalists resisted expansion, claiming it would dilute the talent in the league. Even some proponents of expansion were worried at the idea of immediately doubling the NHL's size.

The expansion fee was US$2 million, and up to $3.5 million to settle disputes with leaving other leagues such as the American Hockey League (AHL) and Western Hockey League (WHL). Experts tended to see that as high, and most expansion teams were seen as having no hope of competing successfully with the established teams in the near future.

Because of the inherent competitive imbalance, there was some support for the idea of placing the new teams in a completely separate division or conference, with a separate schedule for the first few seasons and then gradually integrating the new teams into the established NHL, much like the then-progressing AFL–NFL merger was being carried out. Ultimately, the league partly implemented the idea by placing all six of the new teams in the new West Division. Alternative proposals included putting Detroit and Chicago in the West with Pittsburgh and Philadelphia going to the East. In a surprising concession, the league also agreed to implement a strictly divisional playoff bracket, meaning that four expansion teams would make the playoffs, and an expansion team was guaranteed a slot in the Stanley Cup Final.

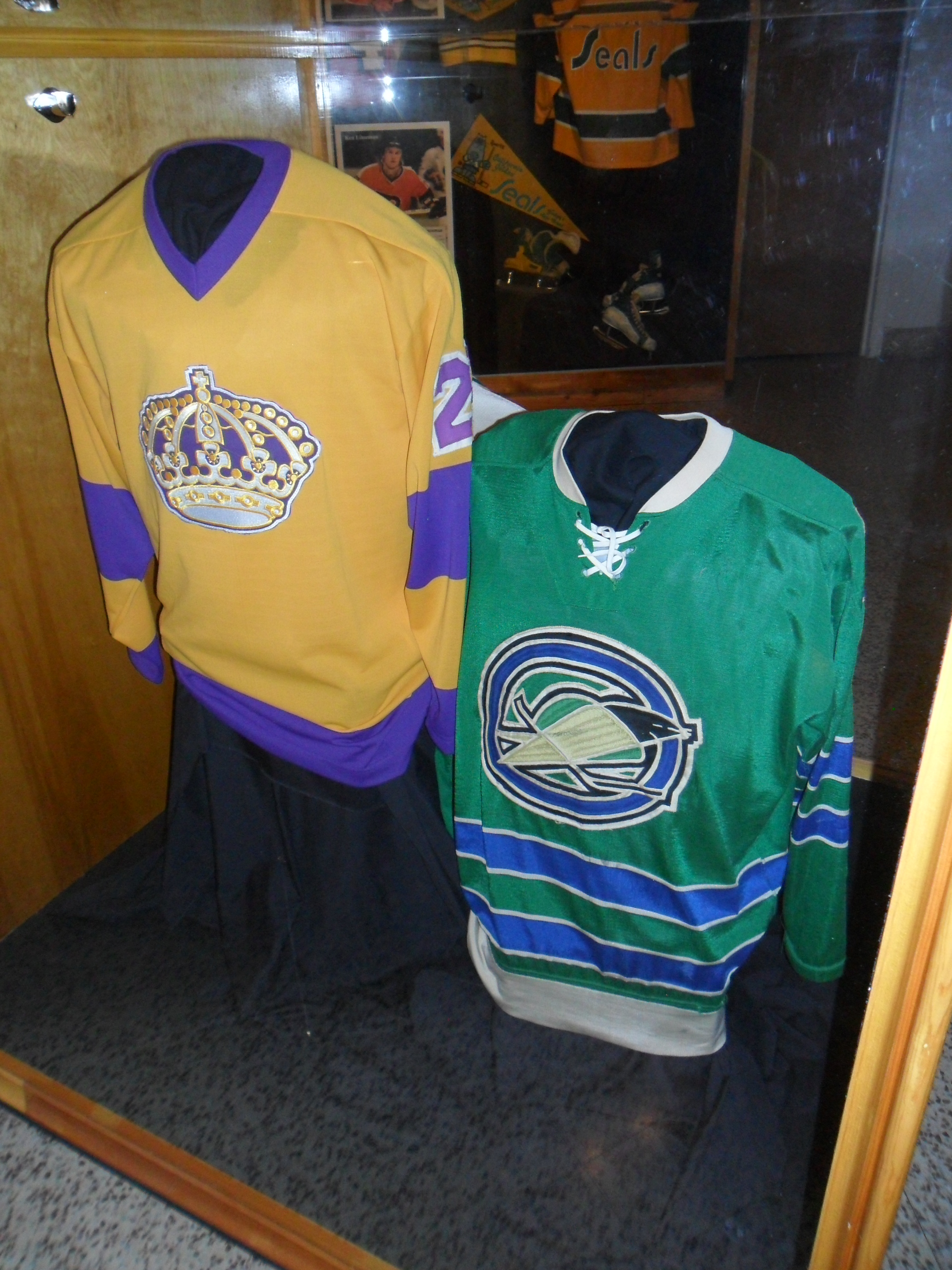
The jerseys worn by the Los Angeles Kings (left) and the Oakland Seals in the late 1960s

== Aftermath ==
The 1967 expansion marked the end of the Original Six era and the beginning of a new era of the NHL. The expansion, Bobby Orr's record $1 million contract in 1971, and the formation of the World Hockey Association (WHA) in 1972 forever changed the landscape of the North American professional game. It was the WHA that ended up being the NHL's chief rival during the 1970s, while the Western Hockey League ceased operations in 1974. The NHL's first expansion period ended in 1974 by which time the league had tripled in size to 18 teams, and then merged with the WHA by absorbing four of its teams in 1979. As a result, the NHL retained its status as the premier professional ice hockey league in North America; no other league has attempted to compete against the NHL since then.

However, the NHL's other goal of immediately securing long-term, lucrative TV contracts in the U.S. similar to MLB and the NFL never fully materialized until decades later. Despite the expansion and the subsequent merger with the WHA, NHL broadcasting on a national scale in the U.S. continued to be spotty throughout the 1970s. With expansion approved, CBS signed a three-year, US$3.6 million contract on September 22, 1966, to broadcast a "Game of the Week" in NTSC color. NBC would later sign a three-year contract in 1972, but neither it nor CBS regularly carried anything close to a full schedule, even carrying only selected games of the Stanley Cup Final. After NBC's contract expired, the NHL was left without a national television contract, and therefore set up an American television syndication package called the NHL Network to air games from the 1975–76 through 1978–79 seasons.

All the 1967 expansion teams were placed in the same division in 1967–68, so their success was largely gauged relative to each other before the 1974 realignment, which radically mixed up all of the league's teams into four divisions and two conferences. Subsequent expansions and realignments separated both the Original Six and the 1967 expansion teams even further, essentially reviving the league's earlier alternative plan to put Detroit and Chicago in the West, and Pittsburgh and Philadelphia in the East. After the 1998 realignment, which reorganized the league into six divisions, only the Flyers and the Penguins are in the same division. When the league realigned again in 2013 to a different four division setup, the Stars and Blues were placed in the same division.

The St. Louis Blues immediately made an impact by appearing in three consecutive Stanley Cup Final in the first three years, but were swept in each. Their first Stanley Cup title in 2019 came 49 years after their previous finals appearance. Although they were the first team from the expansion to reach the finals, the Blues were the last of the five active 1967 teams to win the Stanley Cup.

After the 1969–70 season, the league moved Chicago to the West Division and altered the playoff format to force Eastern and Western teams to face each other prior to the final. Until 1974, no expansion team defeated an Original Six team in a playoff series or even reached the Final again. That season, the Philadelphia Flyers, who had steadily built a strong team, defeated Boston to win the Stanley Cup. The Flyers repeated as champions in 1975 by defeating the Buffalo Sabres in the first modern Stanley Cup Final to not feature an Original Six club. As of the end of the 2016–17 NHL season, which marked the 50th season for the 1967 expansion teams, the Flyers are the most successful of the expansion team in terms of all-time points percentage (.576), second only to the Montreal Canadiens (.590) in NHL history. Additionally, the Flyers have the most appearances in the league semi-finals (known as the conference finals since the 1981–82 season) out of all 26 expansion teams with 16 and the most Stanley Cup Final appearances with a total of eight.

The Pittsburgh Penguins were largely unsuccessful in the beginning, failing to win their division until the 1990–91 season, but accumulated draft picks and built a strong team that won two consecutive Stanley Cups in 1991 and 1992. In 2009, the Penguins became the first of the 1967 expansion teams to win three Cups. Then in 2016, Pittsburgh tied the New York Rangers (an Original Six team) and the New York Islanders (a 1972 expansion team) with four Cups. After successfully defending their title the following year, the franchise tied the Edmonton Oilers (at five Cups), with the Oilers joining the league in the 1979 merger with the WHA.

The Los Angeles Kings did not make a Stanley Cup Final appearance until 1993 during the Wayne Gretzky era. The Kings did not return to the Cup Finals again until 2012, when they finally won their first Cup. Los Angeles won the Cup again in 2014.

While four of the 1967 expansion teams still play in their original cities, one has relocated and one ceased operations. The Oakland/San Francisco Bay Area-based franchise was the least successful of the 1967 expansion teams: noncompetitive both on the ice and at the box office, the club eventually moved to Cleveland to become the Barons in 1976. While the Minnesota North Stars were in a traditional hockey area, the team was struggling financially. In 1978, the two ownership groups merged the franchises into the North Stars with the Barons' owners Gordon and George Gund III becoming the majority owners of the team. Although, the merged North Stars improved on the ice and made two finals appearances in 1981 and 1991, they continued to have financial difficulties.

In late 1980s, the Gunds attempted to relocate the North Stars to the Bay Area, but were denied by the league. The NHL and the Gunds came to a compromise with the Gunds selling the North Stars and were given an expansion team that became the San Jose Sharks in 1991. As part of the compromise, the North Stars and Sharks had a player dispersal and expansion draft in which the North Stars' roster was split between the two teams and then each took part in the expansion draft. The new owners of the North Stars only kept the team in Minnesota for two more seasons and moved to Dallas, Texas, in 1993 to become the Dallas Stars, eventually winning their first Cup in 1999. The NHL returned to the Twin Cities market when the Minnesota Wild began play in 2000.

=== 50th Anniversary season ===
During the 2016–17 NHL season, the four "expansion six" teams still in their original cities had festivities commemorating their 50th year in the NHL and each unveiled uniform patches to be worn by those teams. The patches were unveiled on February 9, 2016, on the 50th anniversary of the NHL awarding the franchises, which led the Penguins to unveil a patch with three Stanley Cups. With the Penguins winning that year's Stanley Cup Final, their patch was modified to have four Cups. The season ended with the Penguins clinching their fifth Cup.

== Timeline of the 1967 expansion teams ==
Among the six 1967 expansion teams, four still play in their original cities. One has since relocated, while the other relocated and then was merged out of existence.

Team	City/Area	City/Area's previous NHL franchise	Years active in original city	Destiny
California Seals	Oakland, California (San Francisco Bay Area)	None	1967–1976	Renamed Oakland Seals midway through the 1967–68 season, and then later California Golden Seals during the first week of the 1970–71 season. Later relocated to Cleveland, Ohio, as the Cleveland Barons in 1976, then merged into the Minnesota North Stars in 1978. As the Dallas Stars, they have won a Stanley Cup title: (1999).
Los Angeles Kings	Los Angeles, California	None	1967–present	Still active in same city. The Kings have two Stanley Cup wins (2012 and 2014).
Minnesota North Stars	Bloomington, Minnesota (Minneapolis–Saint Paul)	None	1967–1993	Merged with the Cleveland Barons in 1978. Later relocated to Dallas, Texas, as the Dallas Stars in 1993. As Minnesota the North Stars, they made two trips to the Stanley Cup Final, but they never won it. As the Dallas Stars, they have won a Stanley Cup title: (1999).
Philadelphia Flyers	Philadelphia, Pennsylvania	Philadelphia Quakers, which were the relocated Pittsburgh Pirates, from 1930 to 1931. The NHL Board of Directors suspended the franchise on September 26, 1931. They cancelled the franchise on May 7, 1936.	1967–present	Still active in same city. The Flyers have two Stanley Cup wins (1974 and 1975).
Pittsburgh Penguins	Pittsburgh, Pennsylvania	Pittsburgh Pirates from 1925 to 1930 before the team relocated to Philadelphia for the 1930–31 NHL season.	1967–present	Still active in same city. The Penguins have five Stanley Cup wins (1991, 1992, 2009, 2016, and 2017).
St. Louis Blues	St. Louis, Missouri	St. Louis Eagles, a relocation of the original Ottawa Senators, from 1934 to 1935. The NHL Board of Directors cancelled the franchise after one season on October 15, 1935.	1967–present	Still active in same city. The Blues have one Stanley Cup win (2019).

== See also ==
- 1967 NHL Expansion Draft
- History of the National Hockey League
- History of the National Hockey League (1967–1992)
- History of organizational changes in the NHL
