= History of the National Hockey League (1917–1942) =

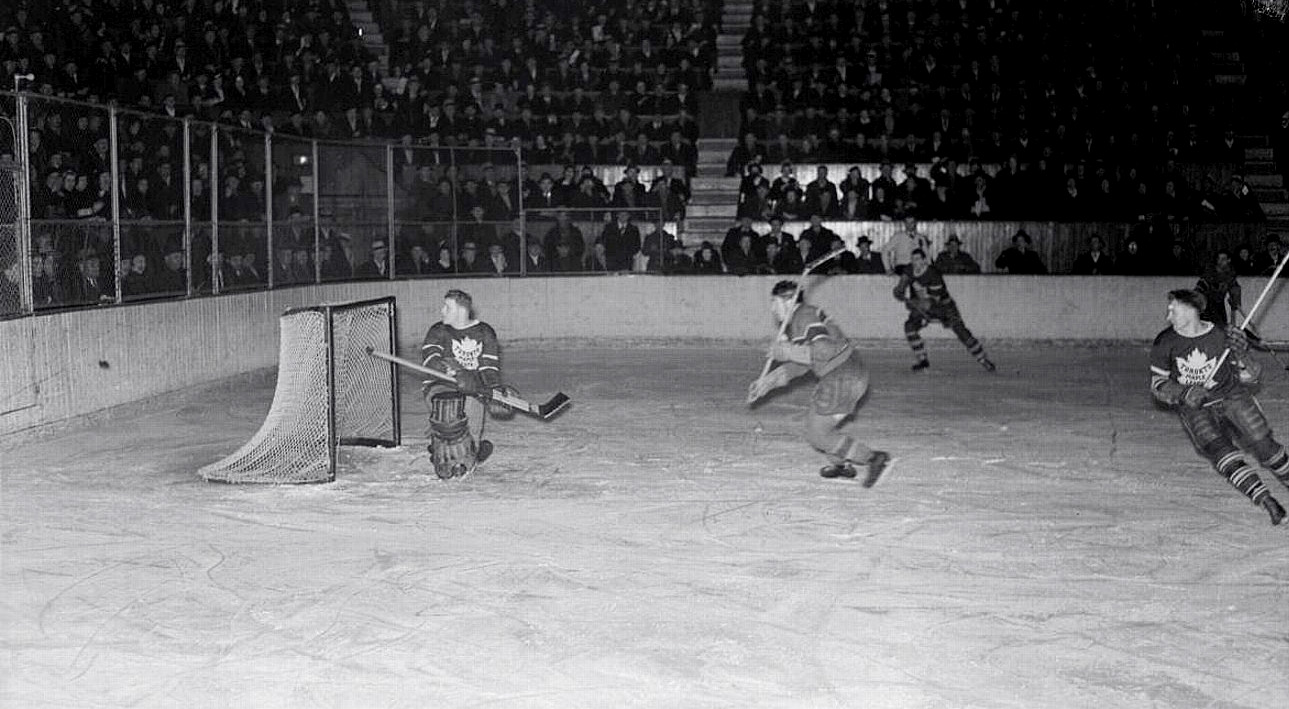
The Montreal Canadiens host the Toronto Maple Leafs in 1938

The National Hockey League (NHL) was founded in 1917 following the demise of its predecessor league, the National Hockey Association (NHA). In an effort to remove Eddie Livingstone as owner of the Toronto Blueshirts, a majority of the NHA franchises (the Montreal Canadiens, Montreal Wanderers, Ottawa Senators and Quebec Bulldogs) suspended the NHA and formed the new NHL. The Quebec Bulldogs, while a member, did not operate in the NHL for the first two years. Instead the owners of the Toronto Arena Gardens operated a new Toronto franchise. While the NHL was intended as a temporary measure, the continuing dispute with Livingstone led to the four NHA owners meeting and making the suspension of the NHA permanent one year later.

The NHL's first quarter-century saw the league compete against two rival major leagues, the Pacific Coast Hockey Association and Western Canada Hockey League, for players and the Stanley Cup. The NHL first expanded into the United States in 1924 with the founding of the Boston Bruins, and by 1926 consisted of ten teams in Ontario, Quebec, the Great Lakes region, and the Northeastern United States. At the same time, the NHL emerged as the only major league and the sole competitor for the Stanley Cup.

The game itself continued to evolve during this time. Numerous innovations to the rules and equipment were put forward as the NHL sought to improve the flow of the game and make the sport more fan-friendly. The NHL played with six men to a side rather than the traditional seven, and was among the first leagues to allow goaltenders to leave their feet to make saves. The NHL's footprint spread across Canada as Foster Hewitt's radio broadcasts were heard coast-to-coast starting in 1933.

The Montreal Forum and Maple Leaf Gardens were built, and each played host to All-Star benefit games held to raise money to support Ace Bailey and the family of Howie Morenz in Toronto and Montreal, respectively. Both players' careers had ended due to an on-ice incident, with Morenz eventually dying, a month after he sustained his initial injury. These early NHL All-Star games would lead to the annual All-Star games which continue today.

The Great Depression and World War II reduced the league to six teams by 1942. Founding team Ottawa, and expansion teams New York Americans, Montreal Maroons and Pittsburgh Pirates/Philadelphia Quakers passed from the scene. Expansion team Detroit Falcons declared bankruptcy in 1932 and only survived through a merger with the Chicago Shamrocks of the American Hockey League and the pockets of prosperous owner James Norris to become the Detroit Red Wings. Desperate conditions in Montreal meant that the city nearly lost both of its teams in the 1930s; the Canadiens nearly moved to Cleveland, but survived due to its stronger fan support. The six teams left standing in 1942 (the Boston Bruins, Chicago Black Hawks, Detroit Red Wings, Montreal Canadiens, New York Rangers and Toronto Maple Leafs) are known today as the "Original Six".

== Background ==
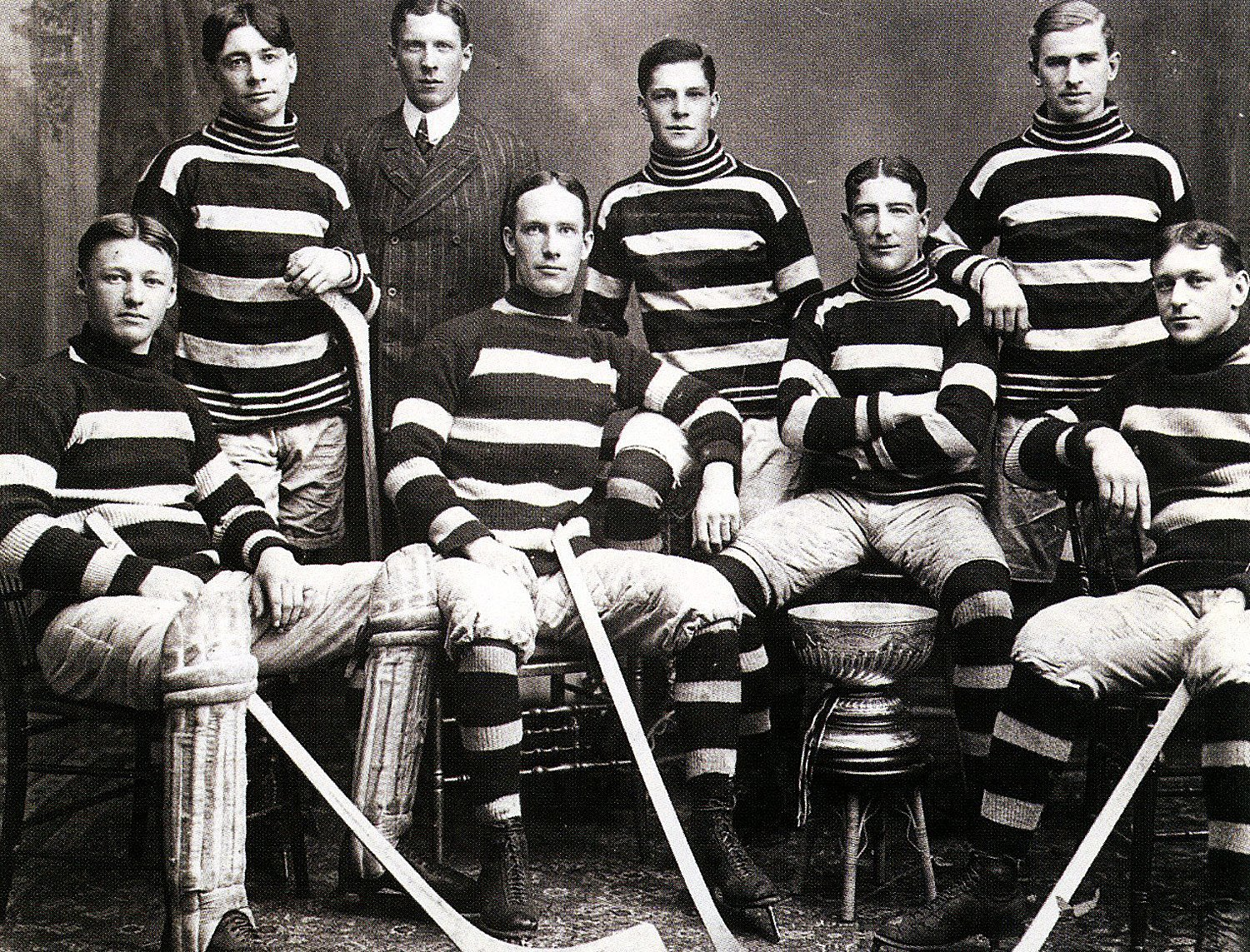
Ottawa Hockey Club, "Silver Seven", with the Stanley Cup in 1905

The first attempts to regulate competitive ice hockey matches came in the late 1880s. Before then, teams competed in tournaments and infrequent challenge contests that prevailed in the Canadian sports world at the time. In 1887, four clubs from Montreal (the Montreals, the Crystals, the Victorias, and McGill University) and the Ottawa HC formed the Amateur Hockey Association of Canada (AHAC) and developed a structured schedule. Lord Stanley donated the Stanley Cup and appointed Sheriff John Sweetland and Philip Dansken Ross as its trustees; they chose to award it to the best team in the AHAC, or to any pre-approved team that won it in a challenge. Since the Cup carried an air of nobility, its prestige greatly benefited the AHAC.

The coordination and regularized schedule that the AHAC brought helped commercialize amateur ice hockey, which ran against the spirit of the prevailing amateur ethic. As the importance of winning grew, AHAC clubs began recruiting players from outside, and the disparity in skill between teams of the AHAC and those of other leagues became clearer. Since team owners in the AHAC wanted to defend the Stanley Cup and maintain the organization's honour, and rink owners wanted senior hockey as their marquee attraction, AHAC clubs became increasingly reluctant about admitting new teams into the league and the senior series. When the relatively weak Ottawa Capitals joined in 1898, the five original clubs withdrew from the AHAC to form the new Canadian Amateur Hockey League (CAHL). In 1903, four new teams created the Federal Amateur Hockey League (FAHL), and in 1904, the International Hockey League (IHL), based in both Sault Ste. Maries, the Upper Peninsula of Michigan, and Pennsylvania, was created as the first fully professional league. The IHL's ability to pay salaries caused an "Athletic War" that drained amateur clubs of top players, most noticeably in the Ontario Hockey Association (OHA).

By the 1905–06 season, several of the FAHL and CAHL markets were overcrowded; Montreal alone had seven clubs. To solve the problem, the leagues merged into the new Eastern Canada Amateur Hockey Association (ECAHA), which kept four of the Montreal clubs. The new league mixed paid and amateur players in its rosters, which led to the demise of the IHL. With the IHL gone, teams from Toronto, Berlin (now Kitchener), Brantford, and Guelph filled the void with the Ontario Professional Hockey League (OPHL). Bidding wars for players led many ECAHA teams to lose money, and before the 1907–08 season, the Montreal Victorias and the Montreal HC left. The ECAHA dropped "Amateur" from its name for the 1909 season, and on November 25, it folded. Ottawa HC, Quebec HC, and the Montreal Shamrocks founded the Canadian Hockey Association (CHA), and the league later admitted the Montreal Le National and All-Montreal HC. Rejected CHA applicants formed the National Hockey Association (NHA).

When compared to the CHA, the geographical distances between NHA teams were much greater; however, the NHA's financial backers were more notable businessmen. These businessmen applied financial principles similar to those of early baseball, and the leagues quickly entered a bitter bidding war over players. In particular, after being rejected from the CHA, Renfrew aggressively pursued any players that the CHA's Ottawa club wanted. Montreal became a notable battleground as the NHA established two franchises, including the modern-day Montreal Canadiens. With its significantly wealthier backers, the NHA easily recruited the top players, leaving the CHA teams, except Ottawa, relatively mediocre. Ottawa regularly trounced its opponents, and league attendance and interest dropped. The CHA's final season lasted eight games, and the league folded in 1910, as its Ottawa and Montreal clubs joined the NHA.

== Founding ==
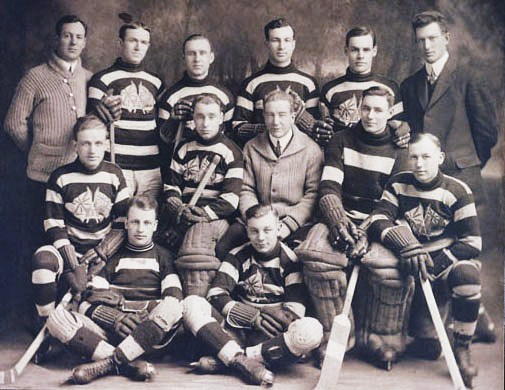
The Ottawa Senators, pictured in 1914–15, became a charter member of the National Hockey League

In the 1916–17 season, the NHA was facing numerous problems. The Quebec Bulldogs were in financial difficulty, while the league's most popular team, the Toronto 228th Battalion, was called away to fight in World War I. Several of the league's team owners were growing frustrated with Toronto Blueshirts owner Eddie Livingstone, with whom they had been having problems since 1915. Prior to the start of the season, the owners of the Montreal teams, Sam Lichtenhein of the Wanderers and George Kennedy of the Canadiens, threatened to drop the Blueshirts from the league over a player dispute Livingstone was having with the 228th Battalion. Livingstone was also in a dispute with the Ottawa Senators over the rights to Cy Denneny, while Kennedy and Livingstone had a mutual dislike that occasionally threatened to come to blows at league meetings.

The remaining owners used the loss of the 228th Battalion as a reason to eliminate the Blueshirts on February 11, 1917. The Montreal teams led a motion to reduce the NHA to four teams by removing the Blueshirts, ignoring Livingstone's attempts to create a revamped five-team schedule. Livingstone was promised that his players would be returned to him after the season. The dispersal of the Blueshirts' players, organized by league secretary Frank Calder, was described by the Toronto Mail and Empire as a "raid of the Toronto players". At the same meeting, the league adopted a motion commanding Livingstone sell the Blueshirts by June 1.

We didn't throw Eddie Livingstone out. Perish the thought. That would have been illegal and unfair. Also, it wouldn't have been sporting. We just resigned, and wished him a fine future with his National Association franchise.

— Sam Lichtenhein, as told to sports journalist Elmer Ferguson

By November 1917, with the sale of Livingstone's Blueshirts still not completed, the remaining owners, realizing they were powerless under the NHA constitution to forcibly eject Livingstone, decided to suspend the NHA and form a new league without Livingstone. On November 26, 1917, following several meetings of the NHA owners throughout the month, the National Hockey League was created at the Windsor Hotel in Montreal. The new league was represented by Lichtenhein's Wanderers, Kennedy's Canadiens, Tommy Gorman on behalf of the Senators, and Mike Quinn of the Bulldogs. A new team in Toronto, under the control of the Toronto Arena Company, completed the five-team league. The NHL adopted the NHA's constitution and named Calder its first president. Quebec retained membership in the NHL, but did not operate that season, so their players were dispersed by draft among the other teams.

=== Minutes of the first meeting ===
At a meeting of representatives of hockey clubs held at the Windsor Hotel, Montreal, November 22nd, 1917[,] the following present[,] G.W. Kendall, S.E. Lichtenhein, T.P. Gorman, M.J. Quinn and Frank Calder, it was explained by the last named that in view of the suspension of operations by the National Hockey Association of Canada Limited, he had called the meeting at the suggestion of the Quebec Hockey Club to ascertain if some steps could not be taken to perpetuate the game of Hockey.
Frank Calder was elected to the Chair and a discussion ensued after which it was moved by T.P. Gorman, seconded by G.W. Kendall[:] "That the Canadien, Wanderer, Ottawa and Quebec Hockey Clubs unite to comprise the National Hockey League". The motion was carried.
It was then moved by M.J. Quinn seconded by G.W. Kendall that: "This League agrees to operate under the rules and conditions governing the game of hockey prescribed by the National Hockey Association of Canada Limited". The motion was carried.
At this stage, Mr. W.E. Northey, representing the Toronto Arena Company asked to be admitted to the meeting and was admitted. Mr. Northey explained that he was empowered by the interests he represented to say that in the event of a league being formed to contain four clubs, the Toronto Arena desired to enter a team in the competition.
Upon this assurance M.J. Quinn on behalf of Quebec Hockey Club declared the latter willing to withdraw provided a suitable arrangement could be made regarding players then the property of the Quebec Hockey Club.
After discussion it was unanimously agreed that the Quebec players be taken over by the league at a cost of $700 (Seven Hundred Dollars) of which amount 50% should be paid to the Quebec Hockey Club by the club winning the championship, 30% by the second club and 20% by the third club in the race....
The meeting then proceeded to the election of officers. The following directors were elected S.E. Lichtenhein (Wanderers), Martin Rosenthal (Ottawa), G.W. Kendall (Canadiens) and a director to be named by the Toronto club.
M.J. Quinn was elected Honorary President with power to vote on matters pertaining to the general welfare of the league.
Frank Calder was elected President and Secretary-Treasurer at a salary of $800 (Eight Hundred Dollars) on the understanding that there could be no appeal from his decisions....

The NHL was intended to be a temporary league, as the owners hoped to remove Livingstone from Toronto, then return to the NHA in 1918–19. Livingstone had other ideas, filing lawsuits against the new league, the owners and the players in an attempt to keep his team operating. Nonetheless, the NHL began play three weeks after it was created, with the first games held on December 19 in Ottawa and Montreal. Although precise face-off times are not known. the Montreal Wanderers 10–9 defeat of the Toronto Arenas at the Montreal Arena is considered to be the league's first game, with the Wanderer's Dave Ritchie scoring the new league's first goal and goalie Bert Lindsay earning the first win. The Montreal game was advertised to start at 8:15 pm, ahead of the Ottawa match scheduled to begin at 8:30 pm. Additionally, game reports indicated that the Montreal game started on time while the Ottawa game between the Canadiens and Senators (won by the Canadiens 7-4) was delayed a short time by a contract dispute. One hundred years later, the anniversary of the first matches would be observed by the NHL 100 Classic outdoor game in Ottawa on December 16, 2017 between the Senators and Canadiens (this time won by the Senators 3-0).

== Early years ==
The NHL's first superstar was "Phantom" Joe Malone. A two-time NHA scoring champion, Malone scored five goals for the Montreal Canadiens in a 7–4 victory over the Ottawa Senators on the NHL's opening night. Malone went on to record a league-leading 44 goals in 20 games in 1917–18. He again led the NHL in scoring in 1919–20, scoring 39 goals in 24 games with Quebec. During that season, on January 20, 1920, Malone scored seven goals in one game against the Toronto St. Patricks, a record that still stands today. Malone was elected to the Hockey Hall of Fame in 1950.

The likely first goal in NHL history was scored by Dave Ritchie of the Montreal Wanderers one minute into a 10–9 win over Toronto, which was the only victory the Wanderers recorded in the NHL. The game was one of two NHL games played that night, and had a scheduled start time 15 minutes earlier than a Senators-Canadiens game that night in Ottawa, although actual game start times were not recorded. On January 2, 1918, a fire destroyed the Montreal Arena, home to both the Wanderers and the Canadiens. While the Canadiens relocated to the 3,000-seat Jubilee Arena, Lichtenhein chose to withdraw the Wanderers, citing the lack of available players due to the war. The NHL continued on as a three-team league until Quebec returned to it in 1919.

In its first years, the NHL continued the NHA's split season format. The first-half champion Canadiens fell to the second-half champion Toronto team in the 1918 playoffs for the O'Brien Cup by a combined score of 10–7 in a two-game, total goals series. The victory gave Toronto the right to face the Pacific Coast Hockey Association's champion, the Vancouver Millionaires, in the Stanley Cup Finals. The Torontos defeated Vancouver to become the first NHL team to win the Cup.

The Canadiens won the NHL championship over the Senators in 1918–19, and traveled west to meet the PCHA's champion, the Seattle Metropolitans. The series is best remembered for its cancellation with the series tied at two wins, two losses, and a tie (2–2–1) due to the Spanish flu pandemic. Several players from both teams became ill, prompting health officials in Seattle to cancel the sixth, and deciding, game. Canadiens defenceman Joe Hall died as a result of the flu on April 5, 1919.

Meanwhile, defending champions Toronto finished in last place in both halves of the 1918–19 season. On February 20, 1919, Toronto informed the league that it was withdrawing from competition. The NHL avoided being reduced to two teams for 1919–20 when the team was reorganized as the Toronto St. Patricks. The Quebec franchise also returned, (known for the season as the Quebec Athletic Club) increasing the league to four teams. The Quebec club posted a 4–20 record in 1919–20, despite the return of Malone. It was the franchise's final season in Quebec City, relocating to Hamilton, Ontario, in 1920 to become the Hamilton Tigers.

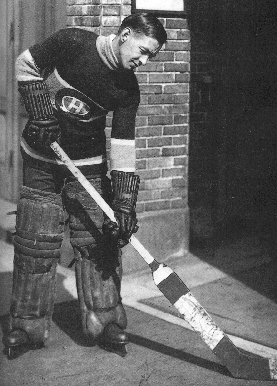
Georges Vezina played 16 seasons for the Montreal Canadiens between 1910 and 1925. The Vezina Trophy is named after him.

Throughout, Livingstone continued to try to revive the NHA, convening league meetings on September 20 and December 11, 1918, which representatives of the Canadiens, Senators and Wanderers determined to close out the expired league for good.

=== Competition with the WCHL ===
Beginning in 1921, the NHL faced competition from a third major league, the prairie-based Western Canada Hockey League (WCHL). With three leagues competing for talent, ice hockey players were among the highest-paid athletes in North America. They commanded salaries equivalent to the top Major League Baseball players of the era. The WCHL only survived for six seasons, merging with the PCHA in 1924, but challenged the NHL for the Stanley Cup four times. In the 1923 Stanley Cup Finals, the Senators defeated the Edmonton Eskimos after eliminating the PCHA's Vancouver Millionaires. In 1924, the Canadiens defeated the PCHA's Millionaires and the WCHL's Calgary Tigers on the strength of two shutouts by Georges Vezina and a strong offensive showing by rookie forward Howie Morenz.

In 1924–25, the Hamilton Tigers finished first in the NHL after four consecutive last-place finishes. While the Canadiens and St. Patricks prepared to play in a semi-final playoff round, the Tigers' players, upset that the team had turned a sizable profit despite claiming financial difficulty, went on strike to demand a C$200 playoff bonus each. Threatened with fines, suspension and a possible lawsuit by league president Frank Calder, the players, led by Billy Burch and Shorty Green, held firm. Calder then suspended the entire team and declared Montreal the NHL champions after they defeated Toronto in the semi-final.

The Canadiens faced the Victoria Cougars, then of the WCHL, in the 1925 Stanley Cup Finals. Victoria defeated Montreal three games to one in the best-of-five final. In doing so, they became the last non-NHL team to win the Stanley Cup. The WCHL ceased operations one year later, with its assets purchased by the NHL for $300,000. The rights to the Tigers' players, meanwhile, were purchased for $75,000 by New York mobster Bill Dwyer to stock his expansion New York Americans. The Americans began play in 1925, replacing the Tigers.

== Expansion ==
The NHL grew to six teams in 1924, adding a second team in Montreal, the Maroons, and the first American team, the Boston Bruins. The Bruins were purchased by Charles Adams, a grocery store financier who first developed an interest in hockey during the Stanley Cup playoffs, paying $15,000 for the team. The Maroons were created to replace the Wanderers and to appeal to the English population of Montreal. The first NHL game played in the United States was a 2–1 Bruins victory over the Maroons at the Boston Arena on December 1, 1924, at an ice hockey venue which still exists today, and is used in the 21st century for American college hockey and other indoor collegiate sports.

The Montreal Forum, which in later decades became synonymous with the Canadiens, was built in 1924 to house the Maroons. The Canadiens did not move into the Forum until two years later. The Forum hosted its first Stanley Cup Finals in its second year, as the Maroons defeated the WCHL's Victoria Cougars in the 1926 Stanley Cup Finals, the last time a non-NHL team competed for the Cup.

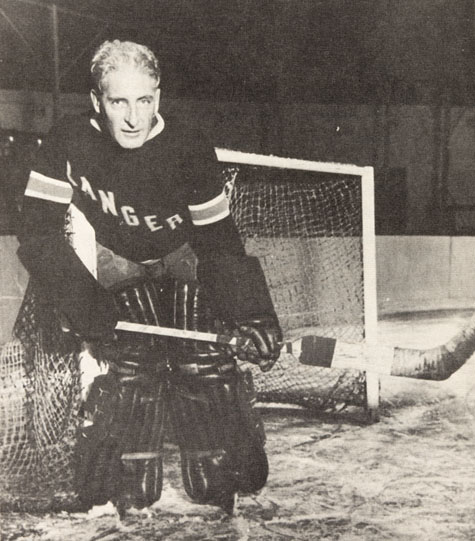
New York Rangers coach Lester Patrick was forced to play goal in the 1928 Stanley Cup Finals.

The New York Americans began play in 1925 along with the NHL's third American-based team, the Pittsburgh Pirates. Three more teams were added for the 1926–27 season. Tex Rickard, operator of the then-new, 1925-completed Madison Square Garden, had reluctantly allowed the Americans into his arena the year before. However, the Americans were so popular in New York he felt his arena could support a second team. As a result, the New York Rangers were granted to Rickard on May 15, 1926. In November of that year, the league announced that the cities of Detroit and Chicago would get teams. Detroit purchased the assets of the Victoria Cougars to stock the expansion Detroit Cougars. The players of the Portland Rosebuds were sold to coffee tycoon Frederic McLaughlin for his new Chicago Black Hawks team. The three new franchises brought the NHL to ten teams.

The Rangers reached the 1928 Stanley Cup Finals, in just their second season, against the Maroons. Lorne Chabot was injured early in the second game of the series, leaving the Rangers without a goaltender. As the Maroons were unwilling to allow the Rangers to substitute a goaltender watching from the Montreal Forum stands, Rangers coach Lester Patrick was forced into goal himself. A defenceman during his playing days, the 44-year-old Patrick allowed only one goal on 19 shots as the Rangers won the game in overtime, 2–1. The Rangers signed New York Americans goaltender Joe Miller the next day, and went on to capture the Stanley Cup in five games.

== Conn Smythe and the Toronto Maple Leafs ==
=== Livingstone's court battles ===
Throughout the NHL's first decade, Eddie Livingstone continued to press his claim to the Toronto franchise in court. On October 18, 1923, the Supreme Court of Ontario awarded Livingstone $100,000 in damages. St. Patricks owner Charlie Querrie made numerous attempts to prevent Livingstone from collecting on his awards. In 1923, he transferred the ownership of his team to his wife, Ida, making her the first female owner in ice hockey history. The $100,000 award was later reduced to $10,000 by the Ontario Court of Appeal, causing Livingstone to appeal to the highest court in the British Empire, the Judicial Committee of the Privy Council in London, England; the court denied his claim.

Despite the reduced awards, the Querries found the pressures of meeting their obligations to Livingstone too great and, as a result, placed the St. Patricks up for sale in 1927. On February 14, 1927, the St. Patricks were sold to a group represented by Conn Smythe for $160,000 despite a potentially greater offer from a Philadelphia-based group. Among the first moves Smythe made was to rename his team the Toronto Maple Leafs.

When Smythe bought the Leafs, he promised that the team would win the Stanley Cup within five years. To that end, Smythe wanted to bring in a star player to help his team. In 1930, with the Senators struggling financially due to the Great Depression, they put King Clancy up for sale. Smythe's partners could only offer $25,000 for Ottawa's defensive star, one-half of Ottawa's asking price. In an attempt to raise money, Smythe entered a thoroughbred racing horse he owned, Rare Jewel, in the Coronation Futurity Stakes at odds of 106–1. Rare Jewel won the race, earning Smythe over $15,000. Smythe then acquired Clancy for $35,000 and two players worth $15,000, which was an unprecedented price to pay for one player. It was also the only race Rare Jewel ever won.

=== "Smythe's Folly" ===
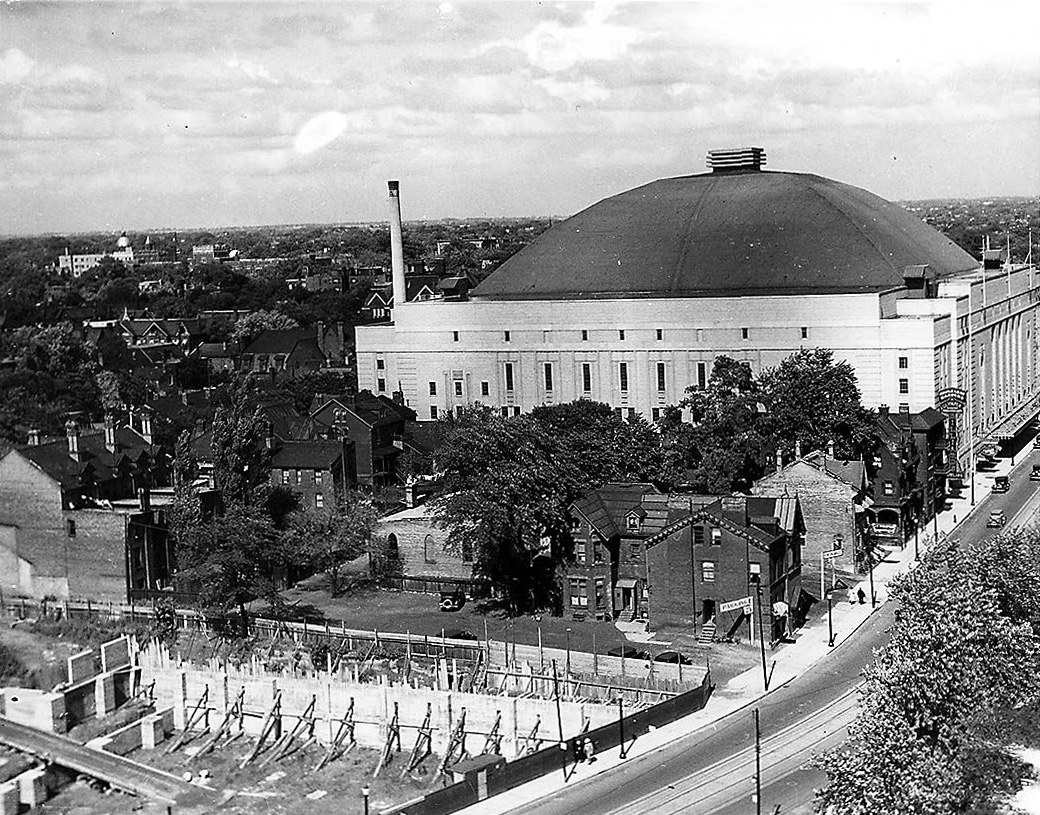
Maple Leaf Gardens in 1934

Smythe also envisioned building a new shrine for his team. He described it as "a place where people can go in evening clothes, if they want to come there for a party or dinner ... a place that people can be proud to bring their wives or girlfriends to". Smythe purchased a piece of land at the corner of Church and Carlton Streets from the Eaton's department store chain for $350,000. Skeptics argued that Smythe would never get the arena built, nor fill it, as the Depression was in full swing. They referred to the arena plan as "Smythe's Folly". To help fund the arena, the Leafs convinced construction workers to accept 20% of their wages in shares in the arena. Just 4½ months after breaking ground, Maple Leaf Gardens opened on November 12, 1931. Many in the sold-out crowd of over 13,000 wore evening clothes in response to Smythe's stated goal in building the arena. In 1932, five years after Smythe's promise, the Leafs won the Stanley Cup in three games over the Rangers.

Maple Leaf Gardens also featured the famous "gondola", a broadcast booth specially constructed for Foster Hewitt. Hewitt began broadcasting hockey games in 1923 on CFCA, a radio station owned by his father, W. A. Hewitt. It was an assignment he initially did not want. Smythe supported the broadcast of Leafs games in contrast of other team owners, who feared that airing games on the radio would cut into gate receipts. By 1931, Hewitt had established himself as the voice of hockey in Canada with his famous catchphrase: "he shoots, he scores!" heard first on the national General Motors Hockey Broadcast on the CNR Radio network. On January 1, 1933, Leafs' broadcasts were heard across Canada on 20 stations of CN Radio's successor, the Canadian Radio Broadcasting Commission (today the Canadian Broadcasting Corporation). Hewitt's broadcasts quickly attracted audiences of over one million listeners. The broadcasts were a precursor to Hockey Night in Canada, a Saturday night tradition that continues today.

=== Ace Bailey benefit game ===
On December 13, 1933, Bruins defenceman Eddie Shore, in a daze following what he thought was a check by Toronto's Ace Bailey, charged the latter player from behind, flipping Bailey into the air and causing him to suffer a severe skull fracture after he landed on his head. The check was so vicious that Bailey was given the last rites before being transported to the hospital in Boston. Neurosurgeons operated throughout the night to save his life; however, Bailey's prognosis was so grim that morning papers printed his death notice. Bailey survived, but he never played professionally again. Shore ultimately served a 16-game suspension for the hit, and avoided being charged with manslaughter had Bailey died.

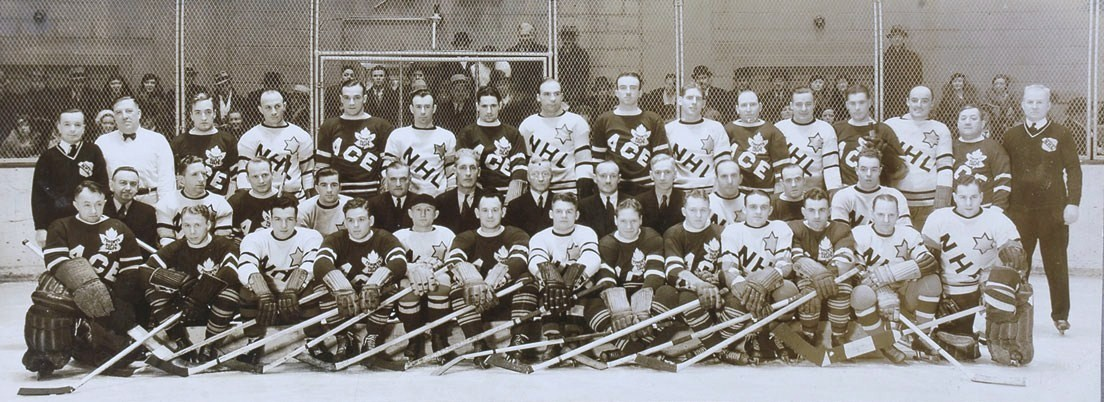
Participants of the Ace Bailey benefit game

To raise money for Bailey's recovery, Maple Leaf Gardens hosted the Ace Bailey All-Star Benefit Game on February 14, 1934. The Maple Leafs defeated an all-star team of players from the rest of the league 7–3 while raising over $20,000. Prior to the game, the Leafs announced that no Toronto player would ever wear Bailey's #6 again, marking the first time in NHL history that a team retired a player's jersey number. Before the game, each player came out and shook Bailey's hand as they received their all-star jersey. The last player to do so was Eddie Shore. The crowd, which had fallen silent as Shore approached, erupted into loud cheering as Bailey extended his hand towards his attacker. Elmer Ferguson described the moment as "the most completely dramatic event I ever saw in hockey".

== Great Depression ==
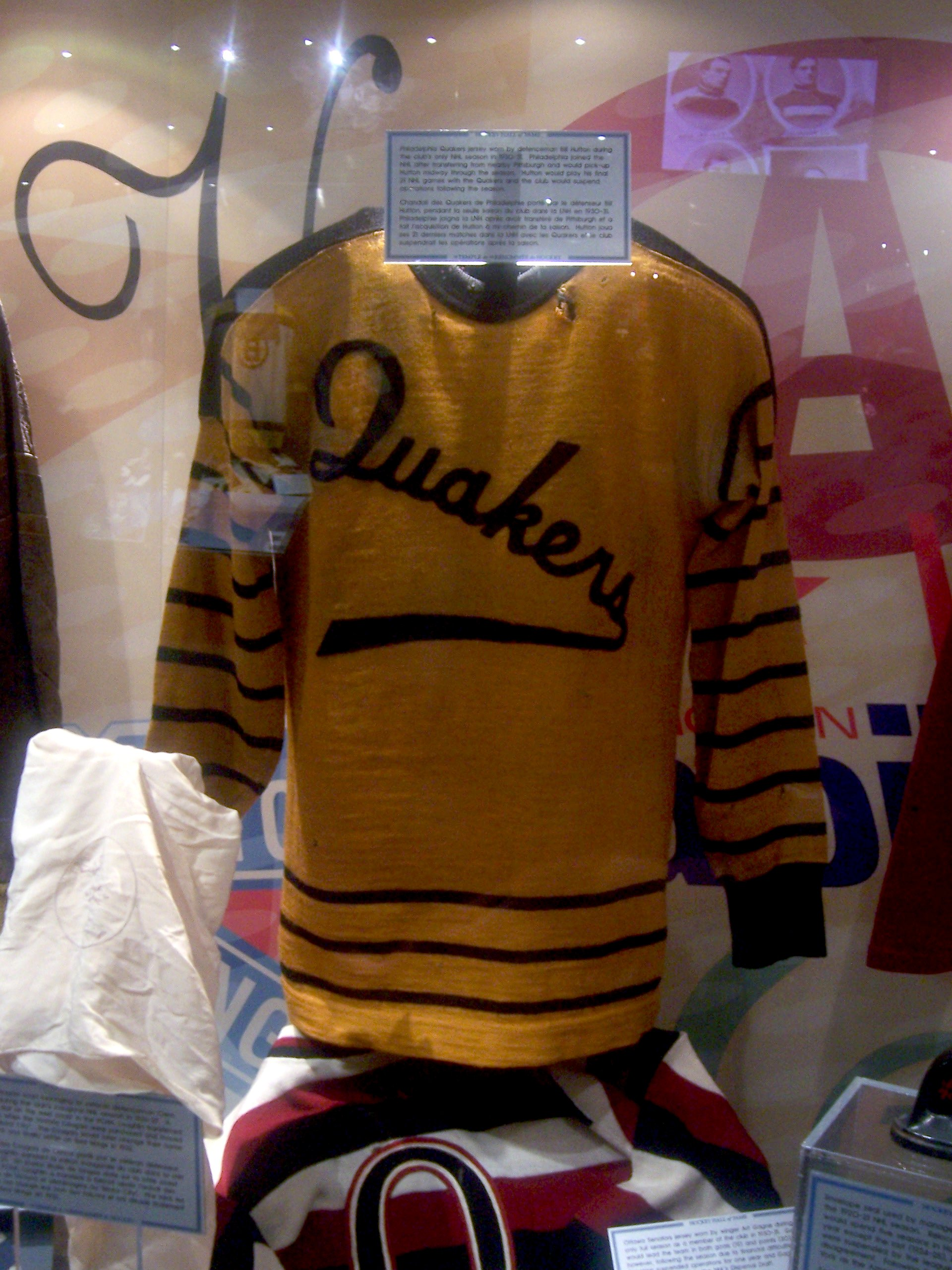
The sweater of the Philadelphia Quakers, in 1930–31; the Quakers were one of four franchises to fail between 1931 and 1942.

While Smythe was building Maple Leaf Gardens, several other teams were facing financial difficulty. At the end of the 1929–30 season, the Pittsburgh Pirates were US$400,000 in debt and relocated to Philadelphia, to become the Philadelphia Quakers. The Quakers lasted only one season before suspending operations in 1931, along with the Ottawa Senators. The Quakers never returned, but Ottawa resumed operations in 1932–33. The Senators continued to struggle, and despite a promise by Calder in 1934 that the Senators would never leave "hockey's birthplace of Canada", the team was nonetheless transferred south to become the St. Louis Eagles. The Eagles played only one year in St. Louis before asking for permission to suspend operations. The league refused, and instead bought and dissolved the team. The Eagles' players were dispersed amongst the remaining teams. It was announced that the NHL would be an eight-team league in 1935–36.

That summer, the Canadiens' franchise was for sale, after posting losses of $60,000 over the previous two seasons. Over forty thousand families and 150,000 individuals were receiving social assistance in Montreal. Owners Leo Dandurand and Joseph Cattarinich held negotiations with A. C. Sutphin to sell the club and move it to Cleveland. Just before the season, a syndicate of local Montreal businessmen, led by Maurice Forget and Ernest Savard, stepped forward to buy the club and prevent the transfer.

=== Howie Morenz ===
At the same time, the league reduced its salary cap to $62,500 per team, and $7,000 per player. Several well-paid star players were traded as teams attempted to fit under the cap. The biggest name was Montreal's Howie Morenz, a three-time Hart Trophy winner, two-time scoring leader and the face of the Canadiens organization. Drawing only 2,000 fans per game in an arena that held 10,000, Canadiens owner Léo Dandurand sent his star to the Black Hawks. The Montreal fans voiced their opinion of the deal by giving Morenz a standing ovation when he scored against the Canadiens on the last day of the 1935 season. Less than two seasons later, Morenz was traded back to Montreal after a brief time playing for the Rangers.

On January 28, 1937, Morenz's skate caught on the ice while he was being checked by Chicago's Earl Seibert; he broke his leg in four places. On March 8, Morenz died of a coronary embolism. Morenz's teammate Aurèle Joliat had a different explanation of his death: "Howie loved to play hockey more than anyone ever loved anything, and when he realized that he would never play again, he couldn't live with it. I think Howie died of a broken heart." On the day of his funeral, 50,000 people filed past Morenz's casket at centre ice of the Montreal Forum to pay their last respects to the man the media called "the Babe Ruth of hockey". A benefit game held in November 1937 raised $20,000 for Morenz's family as the NHL All-Stars defeated the Montreal Canadiens 6–5. Morenz was one of the first players elected to the Hockey Hall of Fame when it was created in 1945.

=== Chicago's "All-American" team ===
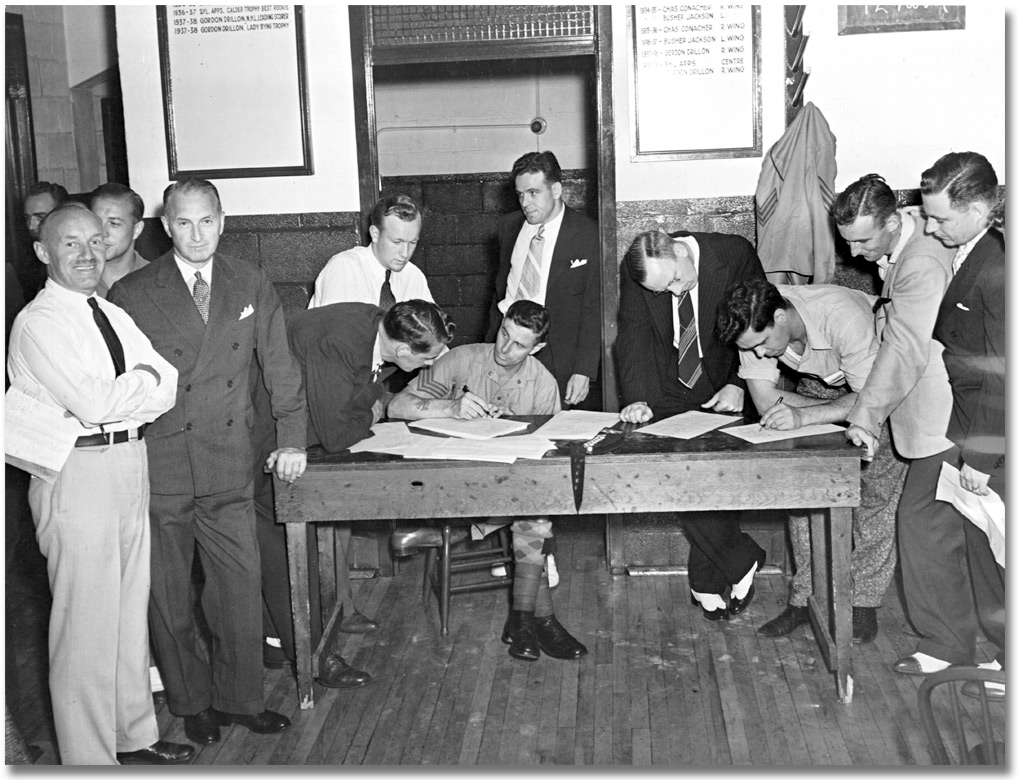
Conn Smythe, seen enlisting with the Canadian military in 1939.

In the mid-1930s, Black Hawks owner and staunch American nationalist Frederic McLaughlin commanded his general manager to compile a team of only American players. At the time, Taffy Abel was the only American-born player who was a regular player in the league. The Black Hawks hired Major League Baseball umpire Bill Stewart to be the first American coach in NHL history. They were led in goal by Minnesotan Mike Karakas, one of eight Americans on the 14-man roster. The 1937–38 Black Hawks "All-American" team won only 14 of 48 games, finishing third in the American division. In the playoffs, however, the Hawks upset the Canadiens and the Americans to reach the Stanley Cup Finals against the heavily favoured Maple Leafs.

In the first game of the final, the Hawks were forced to use minor-league goaltender Alfie Moore after Karakas suffered a broken toe. Moore led the Hawks to a 3–1 victory before being ruled ineligible to play the rest of the series by the NHL. After Chicago lost game two, Karakas returned wearing a steel-toed boot and led the Hawks to victories in games three and four, and the Stanley Cup. The 1938 Black Hawks remain the only team in NHL history to win the Stanley Cup despite a losing regular-season record.

=== Six-team league ===
In the 1942 Stanley Cup Finals, the heavily favoured Maple Leafs initially found themselves unable to counter the fifth-place Red Wings' strategy of firing the puck into the offensive zone then chasing after it, losing the first three games of the final as a result. Jack Adams' "dump-and-chase" tactic led Leafs goaltender Turk Broda to declare the Wings "unbeatable". Toronto rebounded, however, winning the final four games, and the Stanley Cup. The 1942 Leafs remain the only team in NHL history to come back from a 3–0 deficit to win a championship series.

In financial difficulty, and unable to compete with the Canadiens for fan support in Montreal, the Maroons suspended operations prior to the 1938–39 season after being denied permission to relocate to St. Louis. Six Maroons players were transferred to the Canadiens while three were sold to the Black Hawks. The Americans, also struggling in New York and under the control of the league, were turned over to Red Dutton in 1940 with orders to improve the club's finances. By 1942, 90 players had left the NHL for active duty during World War II. Continuing to struggle financially, and due to a lack of players, the Americans were suspended prior to the 1942–43 season. Thus began what became known as the "Original Six" era of the National Hockey League.

== Rules and innovations ==
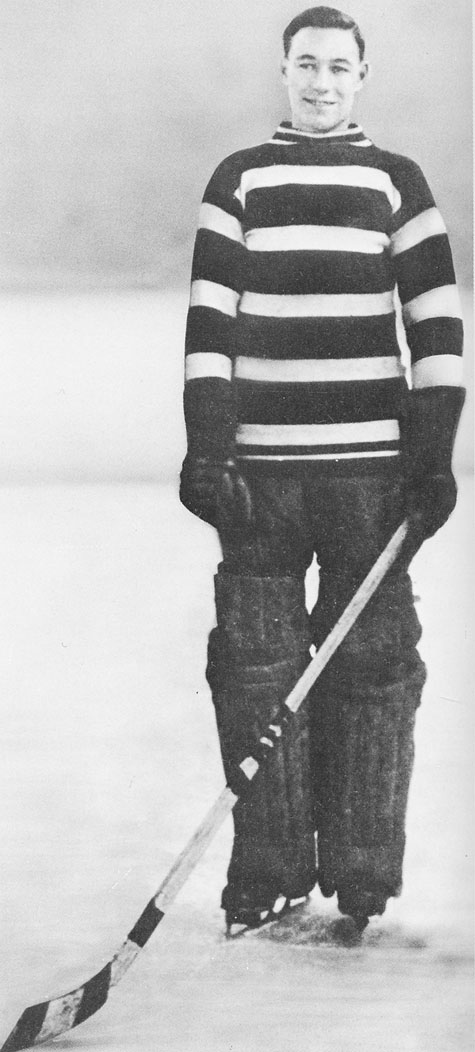
Clint Benedict, shown in 1923, became the first goaltender to wear facial protection in a game in 1930.

The 1920s saw numerous rule innovations as the sport evolved. The Ottawa Senators won three Stanley Cups in the early 1920s using strong defence and the goaltending of Clint Benedict, who recorded a record five shutouts in a 24-game season in 1921. The Senators employed a strategy where they kept both defencemen and a forward in their own zone at all times after they gained a lead. After the Senators' third championship in 1924, Frank Calder made it illegal for more than two players to be in their defensive zone if the puck was not.

Defence continued to dominate the game, however, as in 1928–29, the league averaged less than three goals per game. Canadiens goaltender George Hainsworth set what remains a league record with 22 shutouts in only 44 games. As a result, the league allowed the use of the forward pass in all zones beginning in 1929; previously, forward passing was allowed only in the defensive and neutral zones. The change saw offence rise to 6.9 goals per game over the first third of the season as players began to park themselves on their opponent's goal crease. The league responded by introducing the offside rule early in the 1929–30 season, barring offensive players from entering their opponent's zone before the puck. Despite this, Cooney Weiland, Dit Clapper, and Howie Morenz all broke the 40-goal mark, the first players to do so since Joe Malone scored 44 in the NHL's first season.

Boston Bruins governor Charles Adams had long disliked the defensive tactic of shooting the puck the length of the ice ("icing") to relieve pressure. After the New York Americans iced the puck 61 times in a 3–2 win in Boston during the 1936–37 season, Adams promised that he would see to it that the Bruins played a similar style in New York. True to his word, the Bruins iced the puck 87 times in a 0–0 tie at Madison Square Garden. The NHL introduced the icing rule the following season, calling for a faceoff in the offending team's defensive zone after each infraction.

Benedict became the first goaltender to wear facial protection during a game, as he donned a leather mask to protect a broken nose on January 20, 1930. The mask obscured Benedict's vision, and he abandoned it shortly after. Later that season, Benedict was again hit by a puck, effectively ending his NHL career. It was not the first attempt at changing how goaltenders played their position. When the NHL was formed, the league abandoned the rule forbidding goaltenders from leaving their feet to make a save. While the NHA imposed a $2 fine every time a goalie left his feet, Calder dismissed the idea for the NHL. He was quoted as saying: "as far as I'm concerned, they can stand on their head if they choose to". The phrase became, and remains today, a popular way to describe a goaltender who plays a great game.

Art Ross was an early innovator of the game. He designed rounded goal nets that became the league standard, replacing the old square-backed nets. He also successfully argued for using synthetic rubber pucks rather than real rubber. Some of Ross' inventions did not catch on, however. Ross invented a puck with rounded edges that was rejected after goaltenders complained about their erratic behaviour on the ice. He also created a two-piece hockey stick that had a metal shaft and replaceable wooden blades. The idea did not catch on at the time, but was a forerunner to modern composite sticks used today.

== Timeline ==
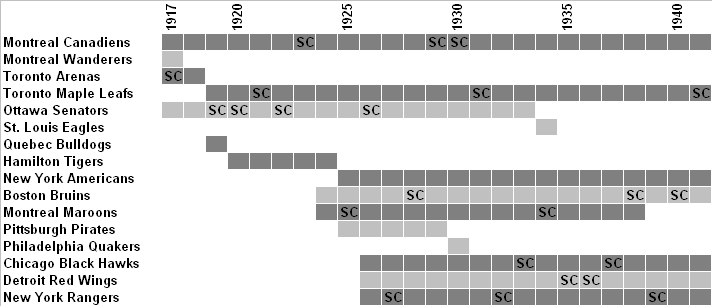

Notes

- Toronto Maple Leafs known as the St. Patricks 1919–1927
- Detroit Red Wings known as the Cougars 1926–1930 and Falcons 1930–1932
- New York Americans known as the Brooklyn Americans 1941–1942
- "SC" denotes won Stanley Cup

== See also ==
- History of the National Hockey League
- History of the National Hockey League (1942–1967)
- History of the National Hockey League (1967–1992)
- History of the National Hockey League (1992–2017)
- History of the National Hockey League (2017–present)
