= Shakeout =

Term in business and economics

Shakeout is a term used in business and economics to describe two things:

A shakeout refers to a period in which rapid growth and overexpansion in an industry is followed by consolidation. When this happens, stronger companies use their capital reserves to acquire or eliminate weaker companies that have overextended themselves. Large, diversified companies that are able to endure a weak business climate benefit from shakeouts.

A shakeout also refers to a situation in which many investors exit their positions, often at a loss, due to uncertainty in the market or bad news circulating around a particular security or industry. This type of shakeout is also known as a market selloff or market correction. A shakeout of investors and internet businesses occurred during the dot-com bubble.
